= List of Hindu temples in India =

This is a list of major Hindu temples in India, by state.

This is a dynamic list. For example, Tirumala Tirupati Devasthanams (self-described as "the world's richest temple trust") has an ongoing campaign to build a replica of the iconic Lord Venkateswara Swamy temple in Tirupati in every Indian state and union territory that does not yet have one. The trust has developed 58 temples since 1933, mostly in the South Indian states of Andhra Pradesh, Tamil Nadu, and Telangana. It most recently opened a temple in Jammu in June 2023. It also plans to construct "smaller temples in remote and backward villages in South Indian states."

== Andhra Pradesh ==
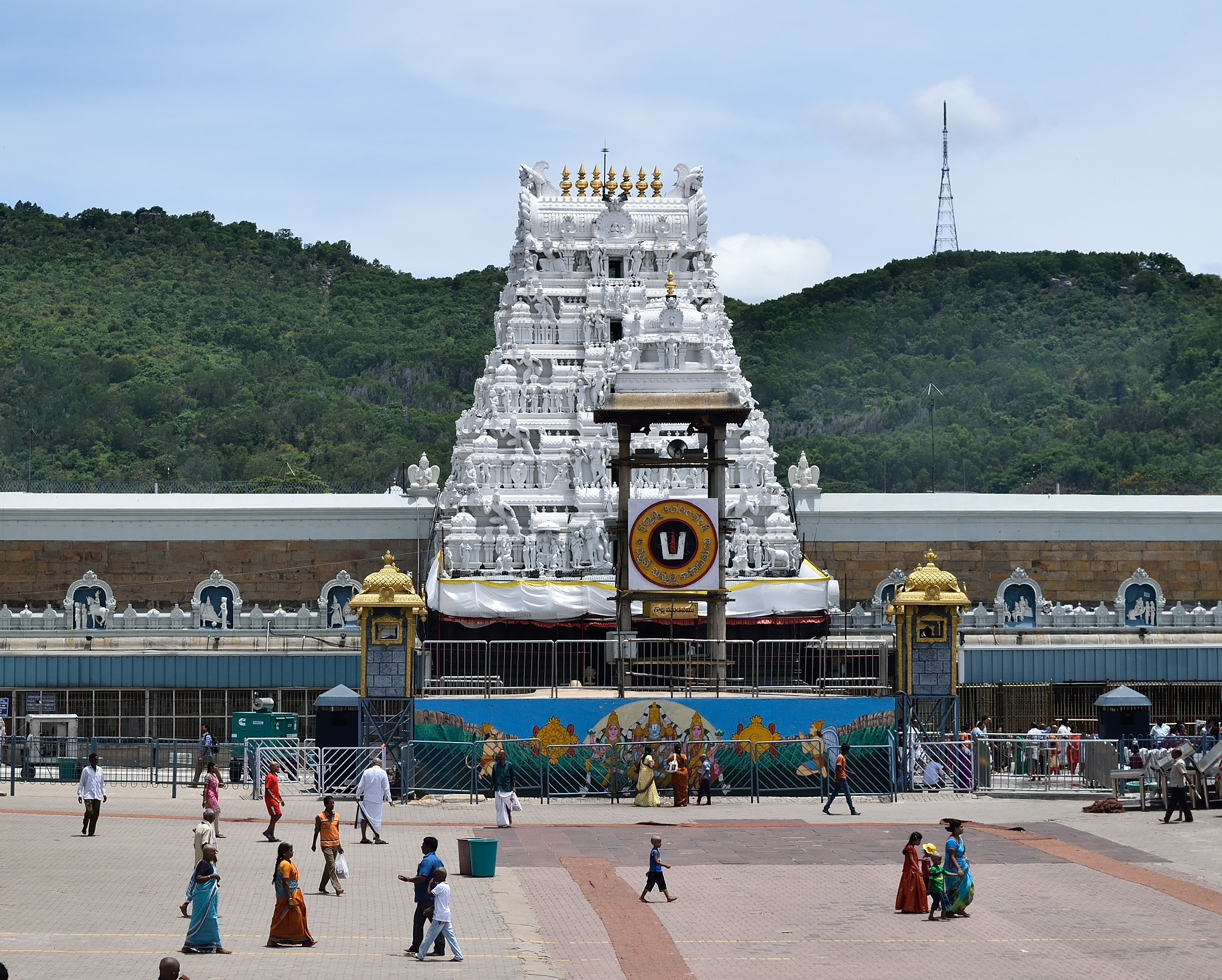
Venkateswara Temple, Tirumala Tirupati

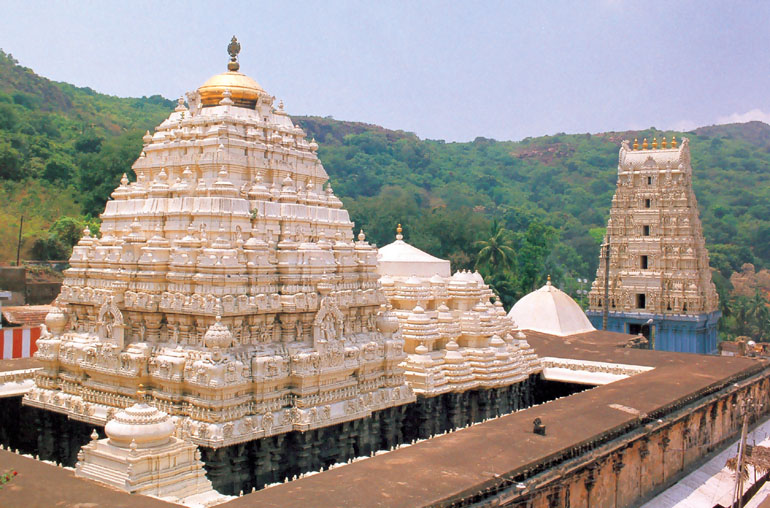
Simhachalam Temple

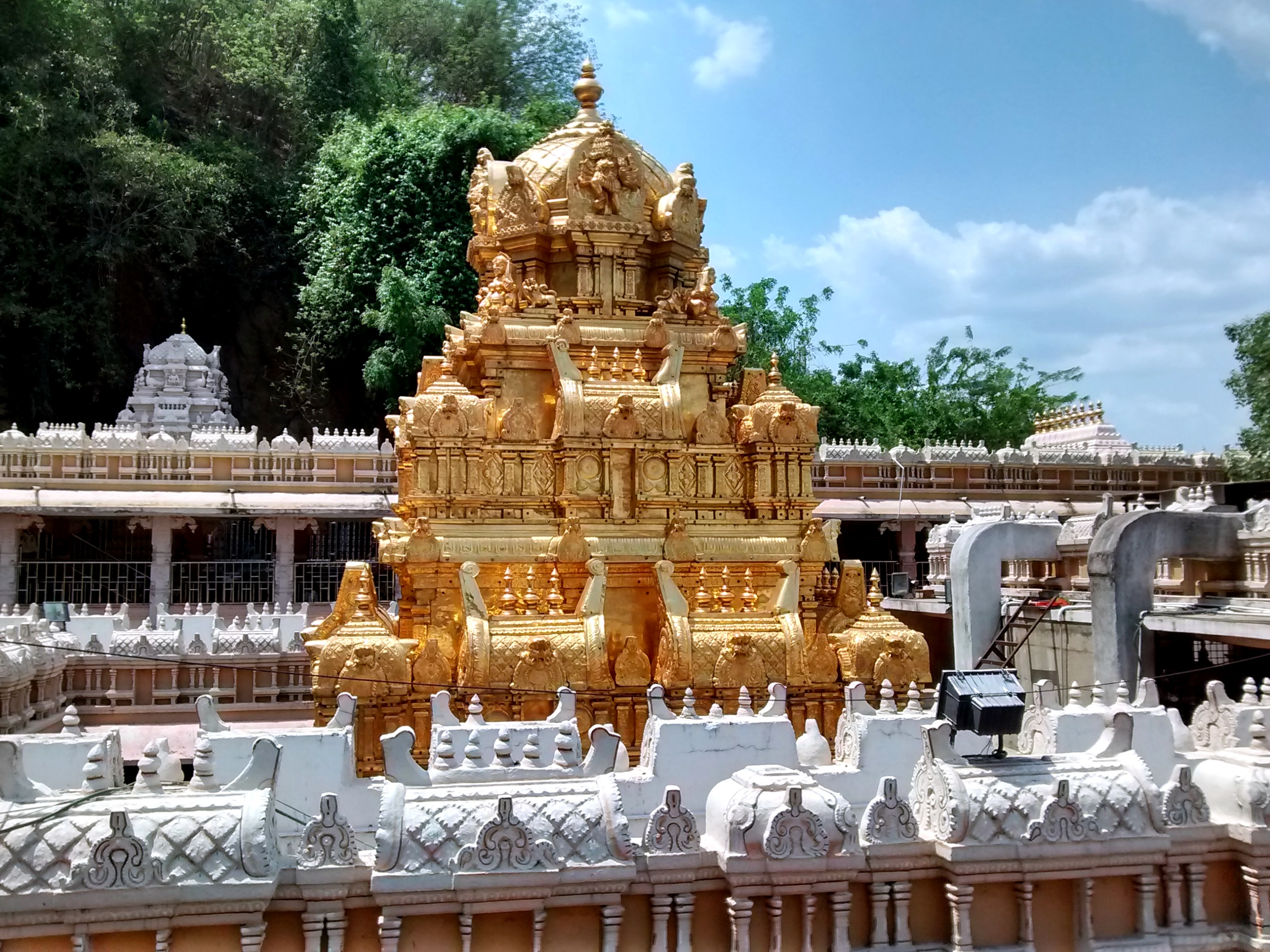
Kanaka Durga Temple

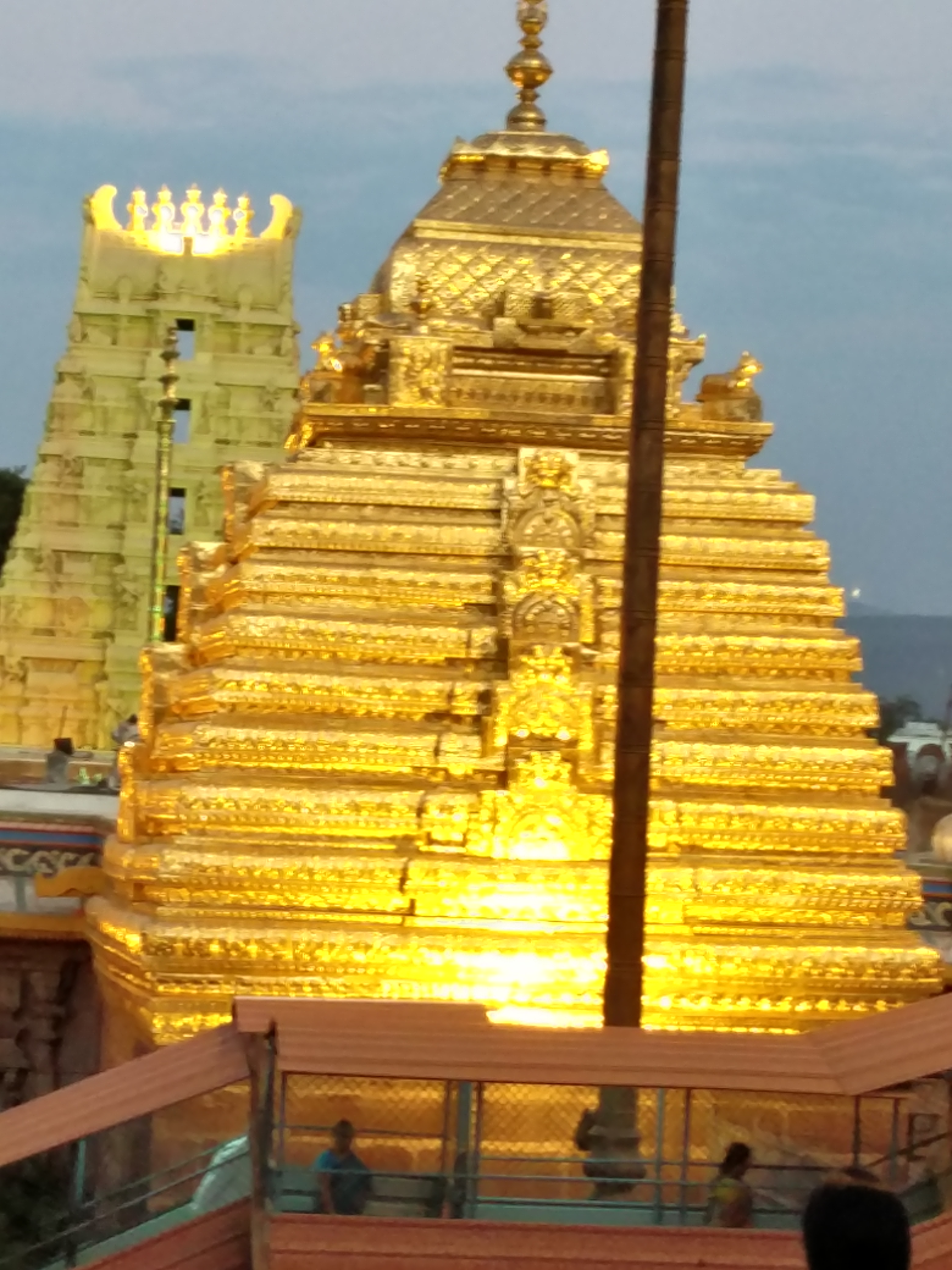
Golden Vimana of Srisailam Temple

There are around 4,000 large temples in Andhra Pradesh state

- Ahobilam
- Alipiri
- Amararama
- Arasavalli Sun Temple
- Bhavanarayana Temple, Sarpavaram
- Bugga Ramalingeswara Swamy Temple , Tadipatri
- Chintalarayaswami Temple
- Govindaraja Temple, Tirupati
- Jogulamba Temple, Alampur
- Kalyana Venkateswara Temple, Narayanavanam
- Kalyana Venkateswara Temple, Srinivasamangapuram
- Kanaka Durga Temple, Vijayawada
- Kapila Theertham
- Kodandarama Temple, Tirupati
- Konetirayala Temple, Keelapatla
- Kotappakonda
- Ksheerarama
- Kulandeshwara Temple
- Kumararama
- Kurmanathaswamy temple, Srikurmam
- Lakshmi Narasimha swamy temple, Penna Ahobilam
- Lakshmi Narasimha Temple, Antarvedi
- Lakshmi Narasimha Temple, Mangalagiri
- Mallikarjuna Temple, Srisailam
- Mantralayam
- Sri Mukhalingam, Srikakulam
- Padmavati Temple
- Pallikondeswara Temple, Surutupalle
- Prasanna Venkateswara Temple, Appalayagunta
- Satyanarayana Temple, Annavaram
- Siddeswara kshetram
- Siddheswara Swamy Temple
- Somarama
- Sri Sunama Jakini Matha, Gooty
- Srikalahasteeswara temple
- Srungara Vallabha Swamy Temple
- Suryanarayana Swamy Temple, Gollala Mamidada
- Varaha Lakshmi Narasimha temple, Simhachalam
- Varahaswamy Temple
- Vedadri Narasimha Temple, Vedadri
- Vedanarayana Temple, Nagalapuram
- Veerabhadra Temple, Lepakshi
- Veeranjaneya Temple, Ardhagiri
- Venkateswara Temple, Dwaraka Tirumala
- Venkateswara Temple, Tirumala
- Vinayaka Temple, Kanipakam
- Yaganti temple, Yaganti

== Arunachal Pradesh ==
- Parshuram Kund
- Rangnuwk hum

== Assam ==
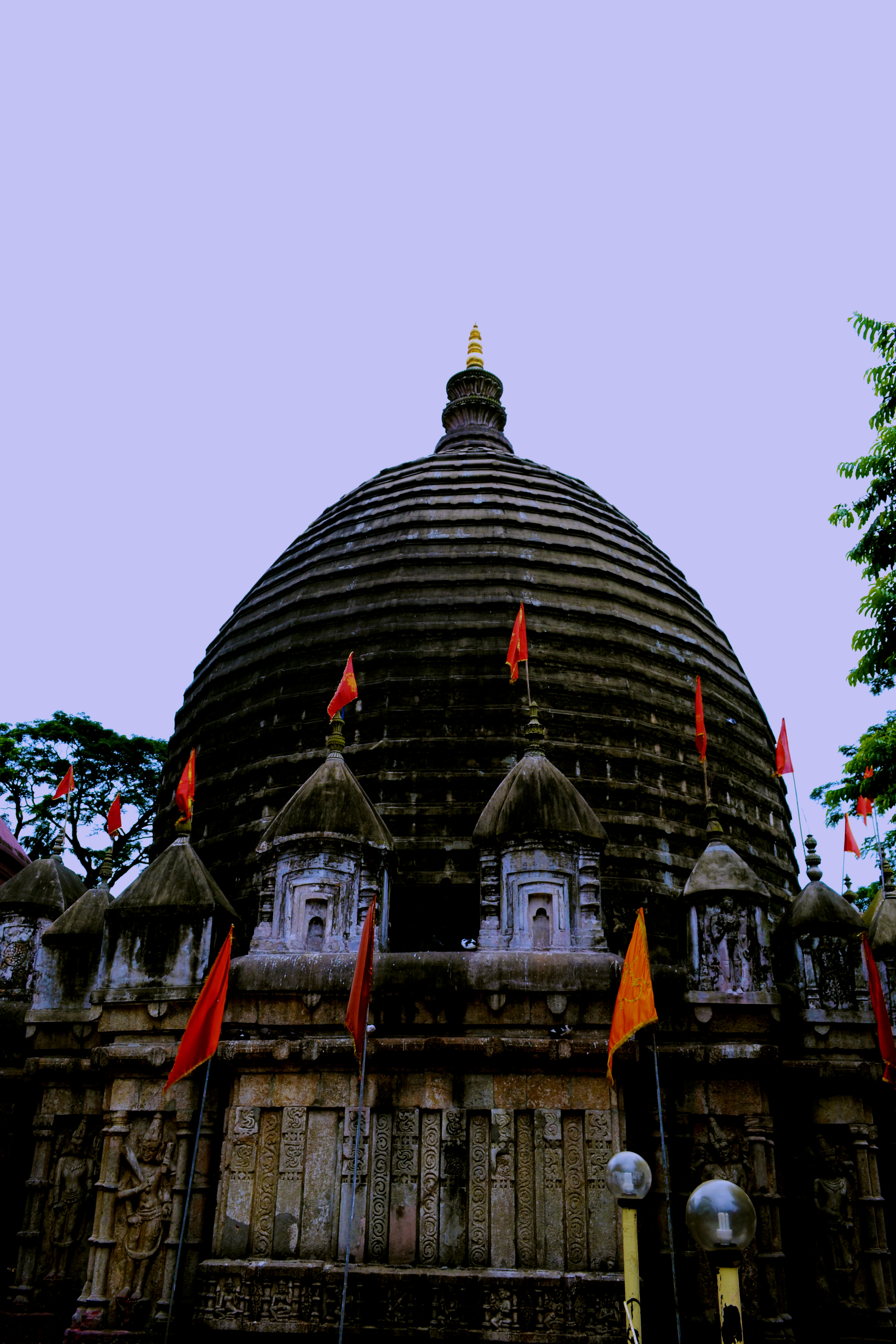
Kamakhya Temple in Guwahati

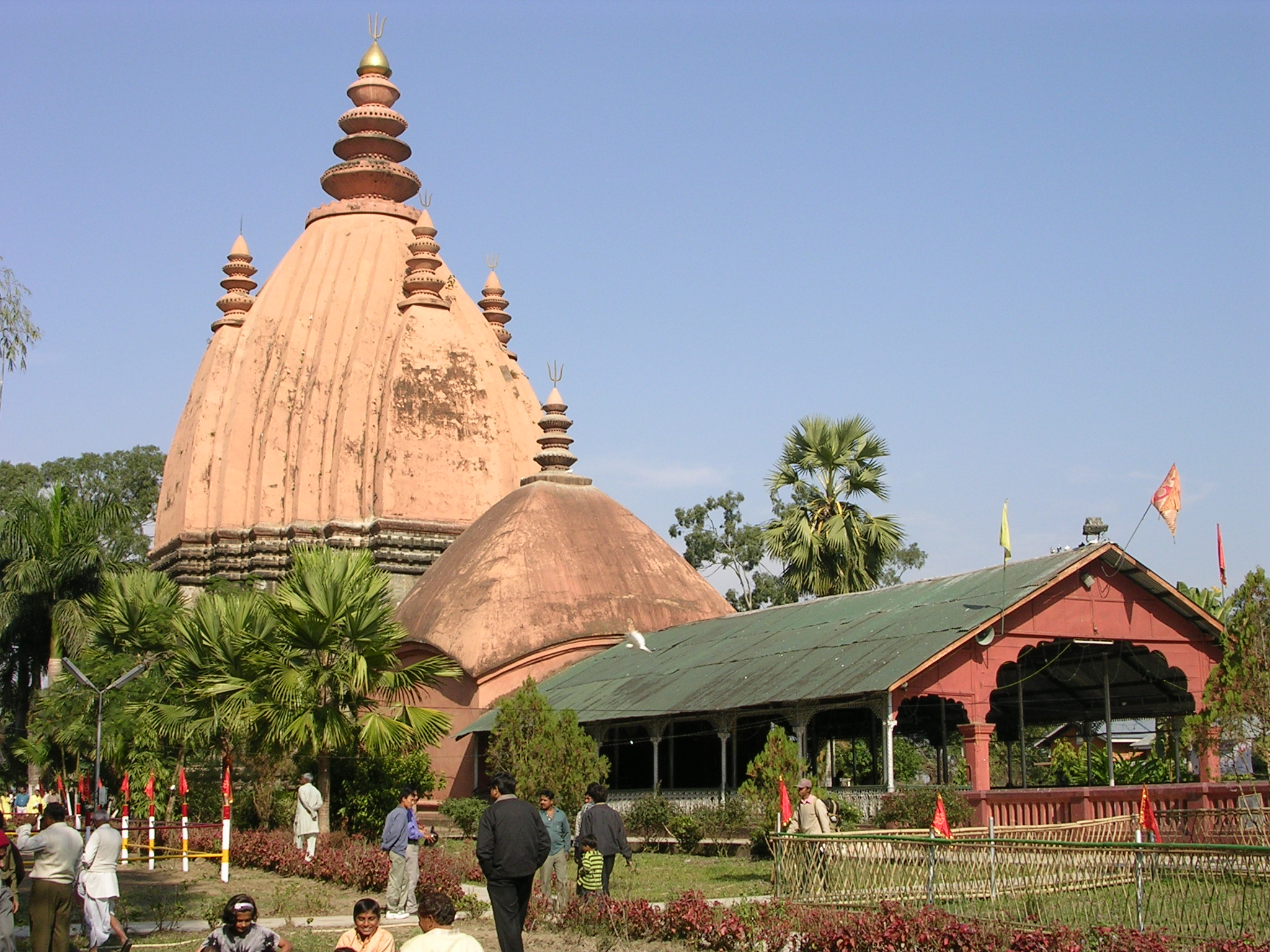
Sivadol in Sivasagar

- Bhairabi Temple, near Tezpur
- Dah Parvatiya
- Deopani Durga Mandir, Karbi Anglong district
- Dhekiakhowa Bornamghar
- Dirgheshwari temple, Guwahati
- Doul Govinda Temple, Guwahati
- Hatimura Temple, Silghat
- Hayagriva Madhava Temple, Hajo
- Kamakhya Temple, Guwahati
- Ketakeshwar Dewal, Tezpur
- Madhab Than
- Mahabhairav Temple, Tezpur
- Mahamaya Dham, Dhubri district
- Malinithan
- Navagraha temples, Guwahati
- Negheriting Shiva Doul, Dergaon
- Rangnath Dol
- Rudreswar Temple, Guwahati
- Sivasagar Sivadol
- Sukreswar Temple, Guwahati
- Tamreswari Temple
- Ugratara Devalaya, Guwahati

== Bihar ==
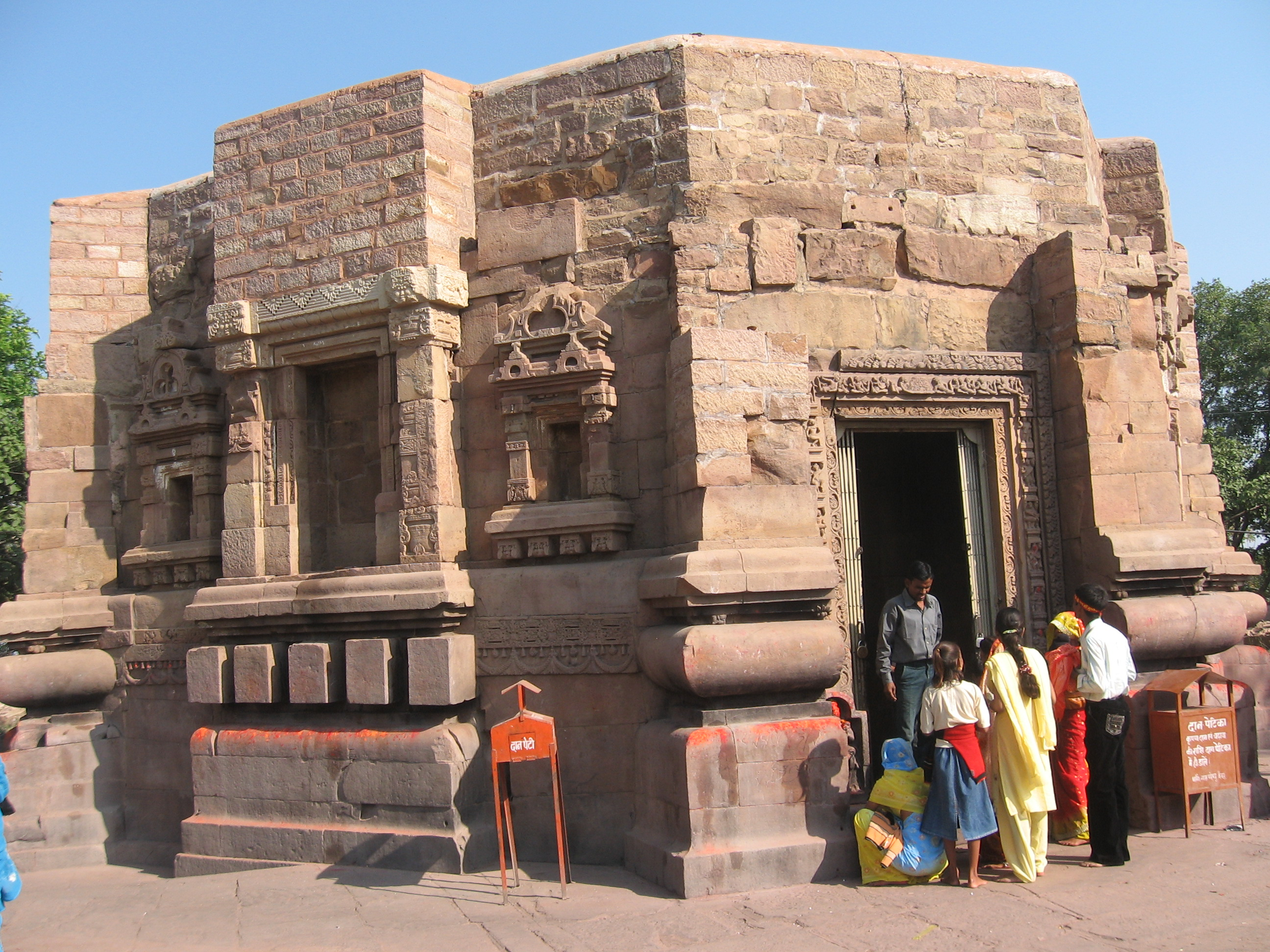
Mundeshwari Temple

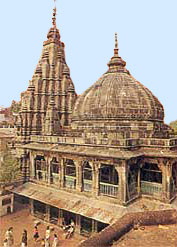
Vishnupad Mandir

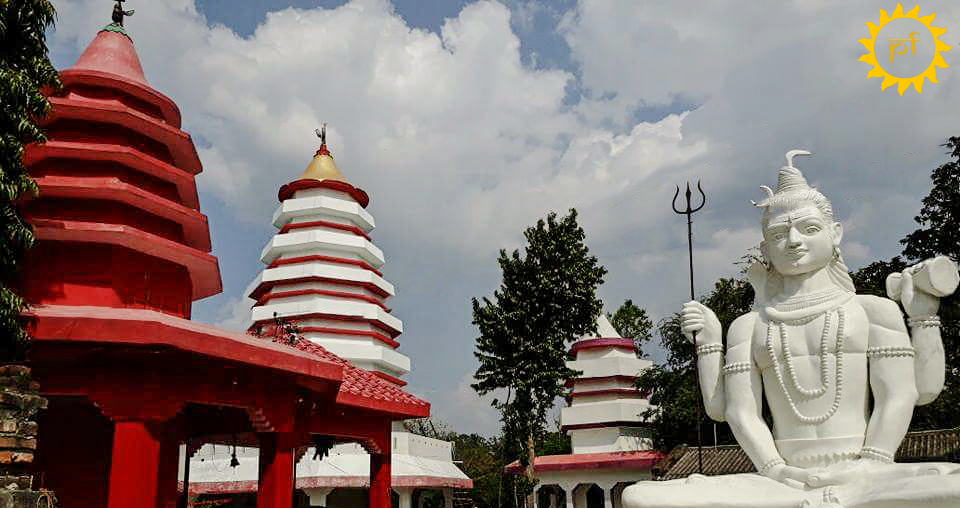
Parasmaninath Temple

- Aami Mandir
- Baba Mukteshwarnath Dham, Deohar
- Bari Sangat Bihar
- Budhanath Temple, Bhagalpur
- Budhimai
- Chandika Sthan, Munger
- Garibnath Temple
- Kapileshwar Temple
- Khudneshwar Asthan Morwa
- Lal Keshwar Shiv Temple, Bagmusha, Hajipur
- Maa Tara Chandi Temple
- Mahavir Mandir, Patna
- Mangla Gauri Temple
- Mitheshwarnath Shiva Temple
- Mundeshwari Temple
- Maharani sthan, Barhiya
- Pataleshwar Mandir, Hajipur
- Patan Devi
- Ramchaura Mandir, Hajipur
- Shitala Mata Temple, Patna
- Shri Adinath Akhara
- Sita Kund
- Thawe Mandir
- Ugna Mahadev, Bhawanipur
- Viraat Ramayan Mandir
- Vishnudham Mandir
- Vishnupad Temple, Gaya

== Chandigarh ==
- Chandi Mandir

== Chhattisgarh ==
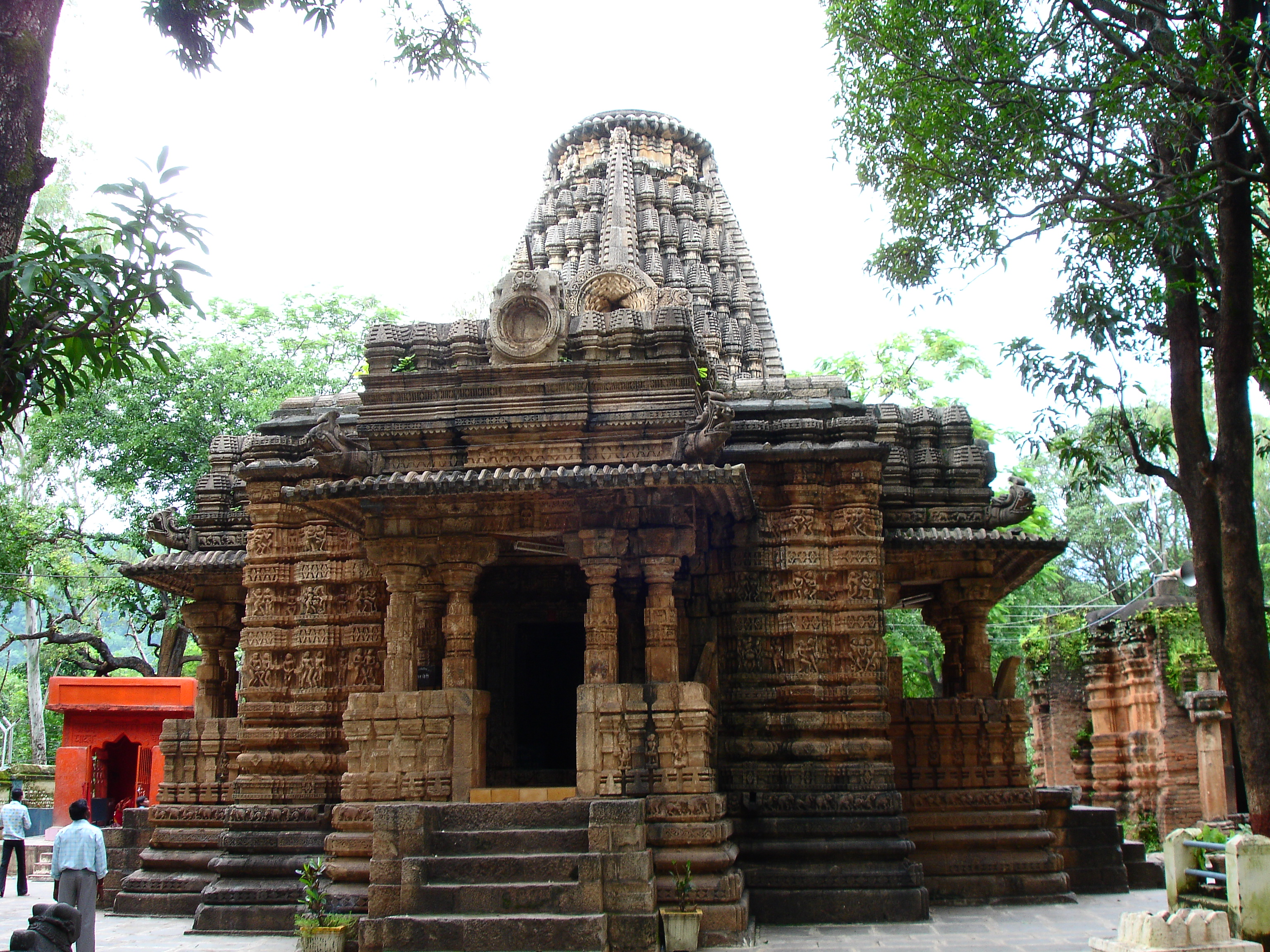
Bhoramdeo Temple

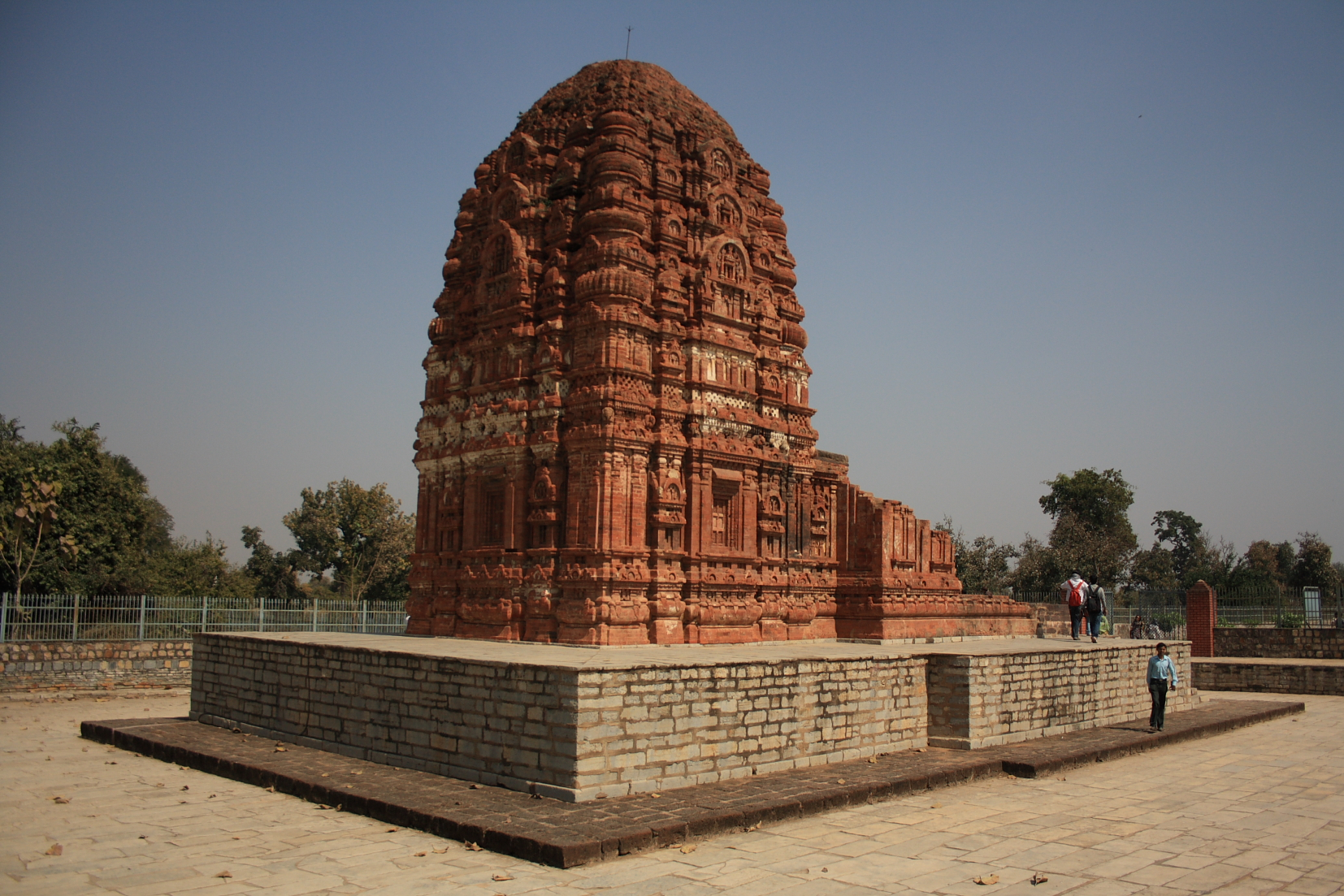
Laxman Temple, Sirpur

- Ashtabhuji Temple
- Bambleshwari Temple, Dongargarh
- Barfani Dham
- Bhoramdeo Temple, Kawardha
- Danteshwari Temple, Dantewada
- Dudhadhari temple
- Ganga Maiya
- Maa Bagheshwari Devi Temple, Kudargarh, Surajpur
- Laxman Temple, Sirpur
- Mahadev Temple, Deobaloda - Deobaloda, Durg
- Mahamaya Temple, Ambikapur, Surguja
- Mahamaya Temple, Ratanpur, Bilaspur
- Mata Kaushalya Temple
- Sarvamangla, Korba

== Delhi ==
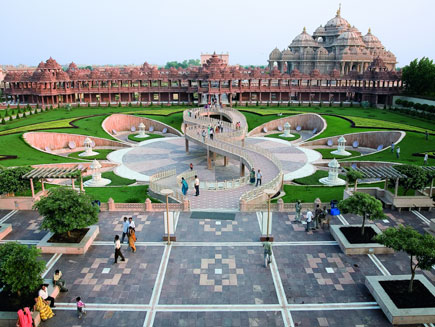
Akshardham

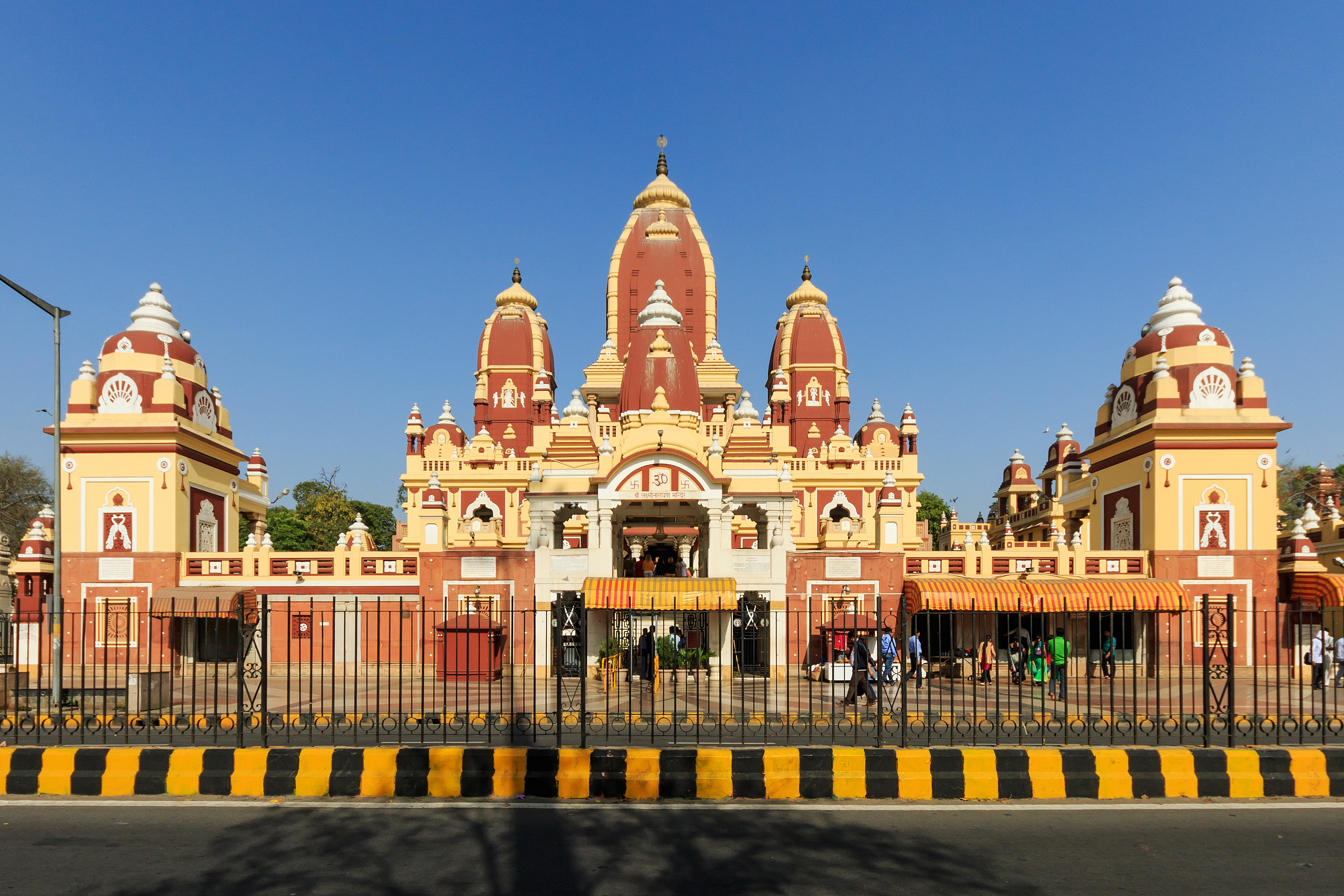
Laxminarayan Birla Temple

- Chhatarpur Temple
- Chittaranjan Park Kali Mandir
- Hanuman Temple, Connaught Place
- ISKCON Temple, Delhi
- Jhandewalan Temple
- Kalkaji Mandir
- New Delhi Kali Bari
- Nili Chhatri
- Shani Dham Temple
- Swaminarayan Akshardham
- Uttara Guruvayurappan Temple
- Uttara Swami Malai Temple
- Yogmaya Temple

== Goa ==
- Shri Damodar Temple, Zambaulim
- Mahadev Temple, Tambdi Surla
- Mahalasa Narayani Temple, Mardol
- Mandodari Temple, Betki

== Gujarat ==
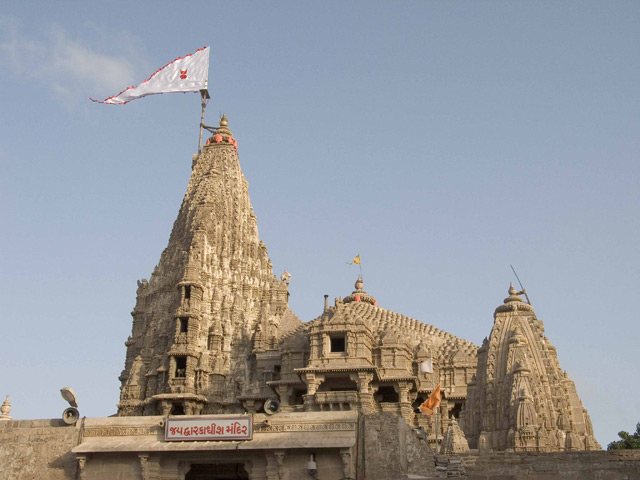
Dwarkadhish Temple

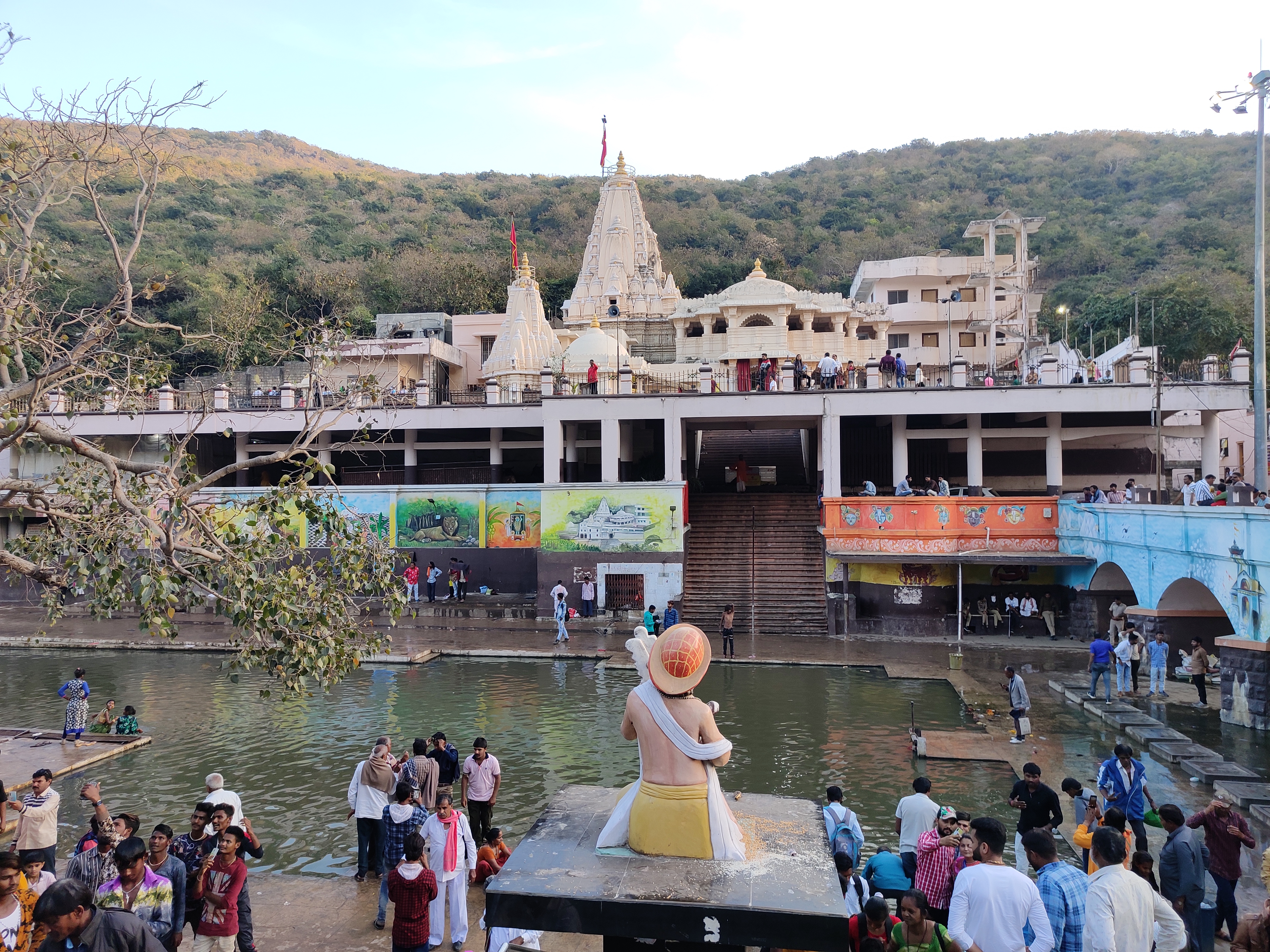
Radha Damodar Temple, Junagadh

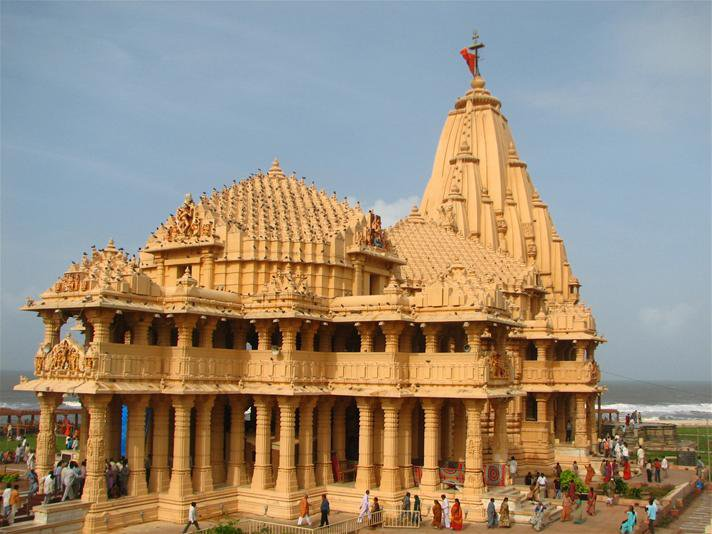
Somnath temple

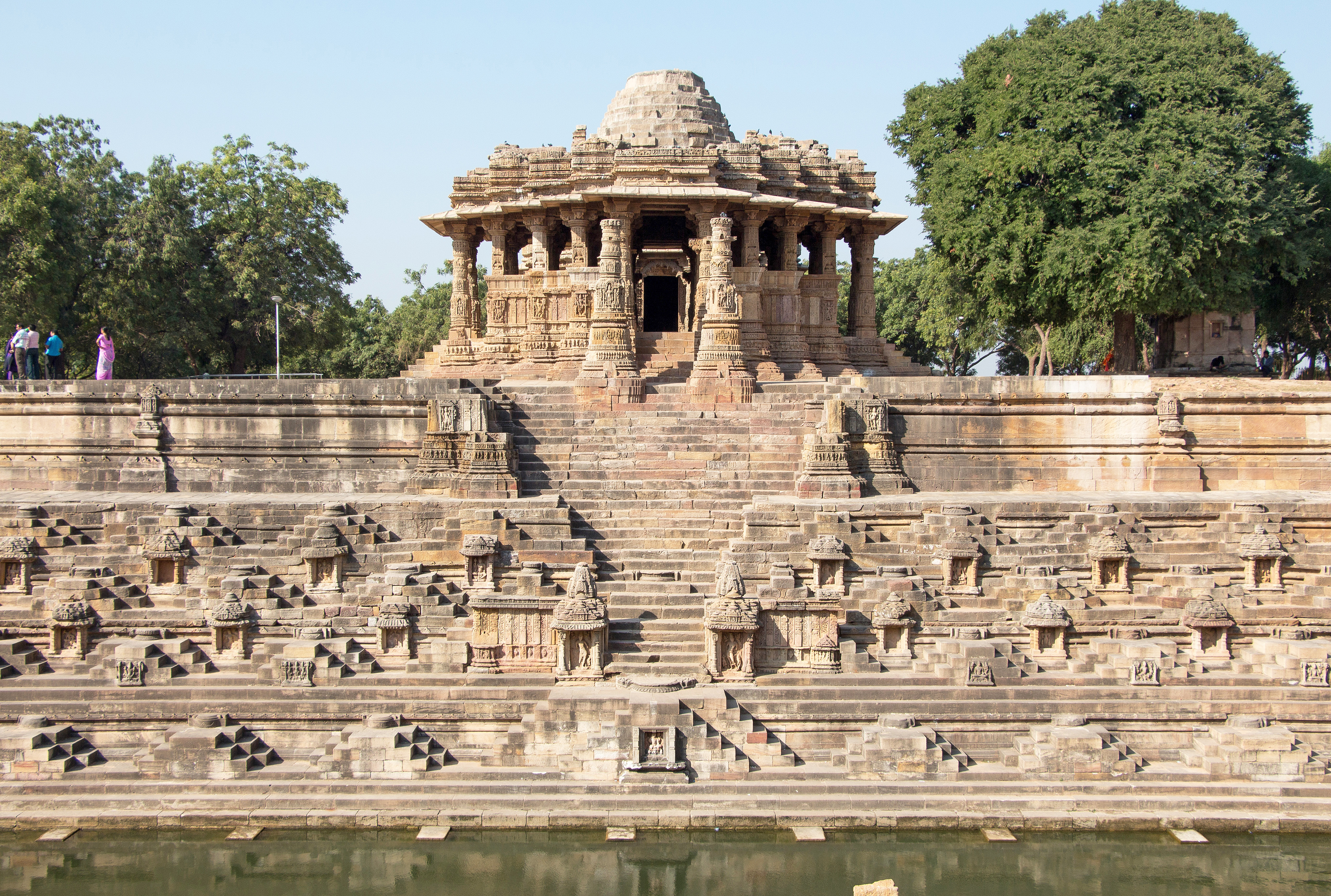
Sun Temple, Modhera

- Ahmedabad Kali Bari
- Bahuchara Mata
- Becharaji
- Bhalka
- Bhavnath Temple, Mau
- Bhavnath
- Camp Hanuman Temple
- Chotila
- Dwarkadhish Temple
- EME Temple
- Girnar
- Gorthiya Mahadev Temple
- Hanuman temple, Salangpur
- Jagannath Temple, Ahmedabad
- Kalika Mata Temple, Pavagadh
- Nageshwar Jyotirlinga
- Navlakha temple, Ghumli
- Neminath Jain Temple, Girnar
- New Swaminarayan temple, Bhuj
- Radha Damodar Temple, Junagadh
- Rudra Mahalaya Temple
- Rukmini Devi Temple
- Sadhimataji temple
- Santram Mandir
- Shamlaji
- Shiva temple, Kera
- Shri Keshavraiji Temple, Bet Dwarka
- Someshwar Mahadev Temple
- Somnath Temple
- Sun Temple, Modhera
- Swaminarayan Akshardham (Gandhinagar)
- Swaminarayan Mandir, Gadhada
- Swaminarayan Temple, Ahmedabad
- Umiya Mata Temple

== Haryana ==
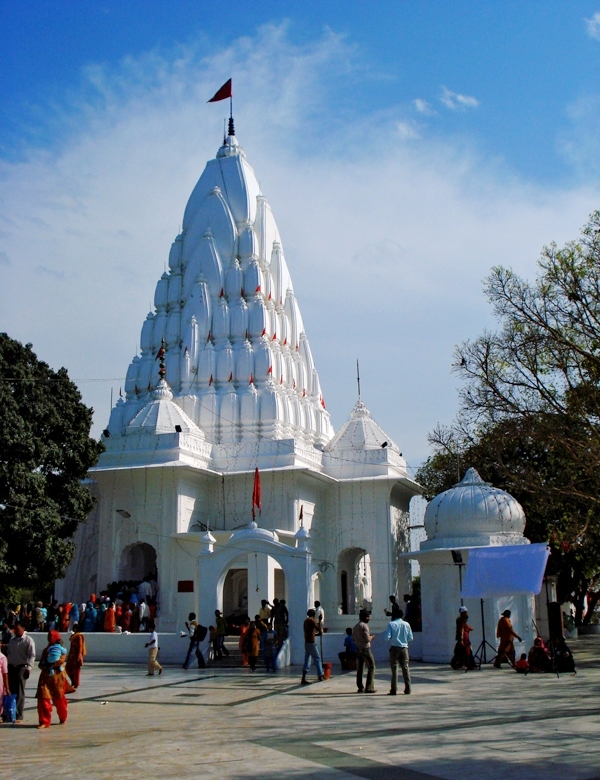
Patiala temple inside Mansa Devi Mandir complex

- Agroha Dham
- Bhuteshwar Temple
- Brahma Sarovar, Kurukshetra
- Jyotisar, Kurukshetra
- Kartikeya Temple, Pehowa
- Mata Mansa Devi Mandir
- Pindara Temple
- Sannihit Sarovar, Kurukshetra
- Sthaneshwar Mahadev Temple

== Himachal Pradesh ==
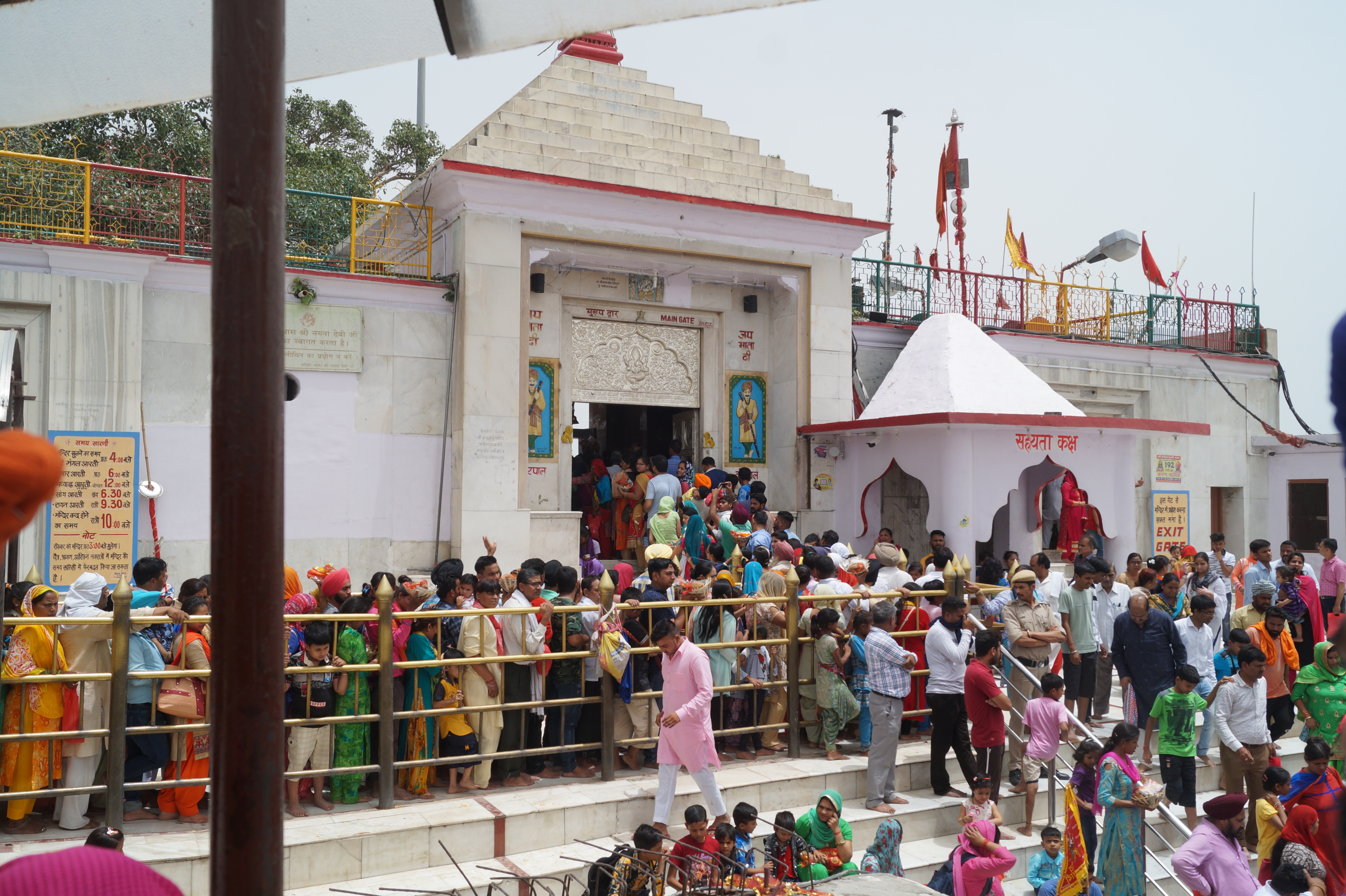
Naina Devi, Bilsapur, one of the five Shaktipeethas in Himachal Pradesh

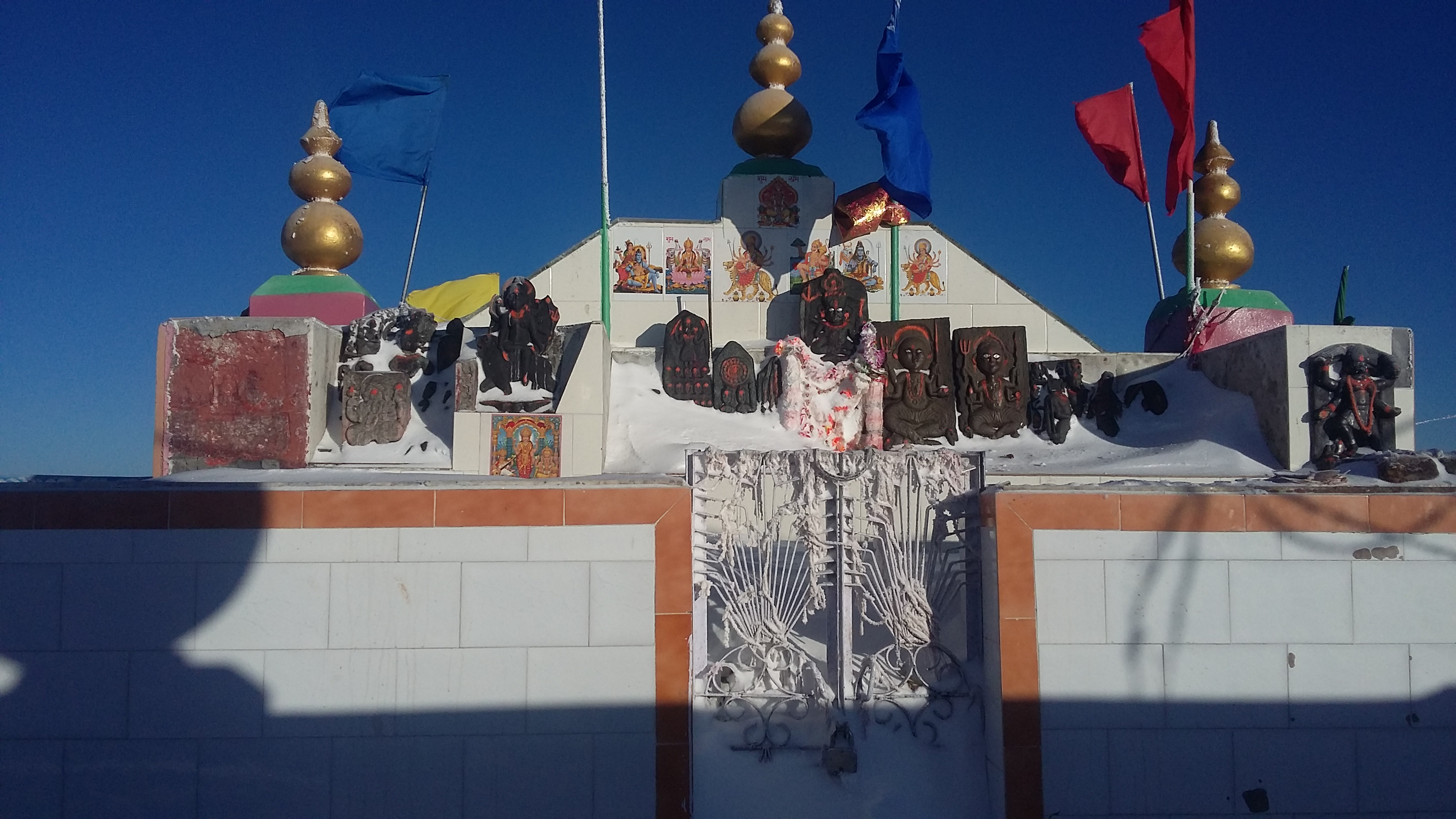
Shikari Devi Temple, world's sole roofless temple in Karsog, Mandi district

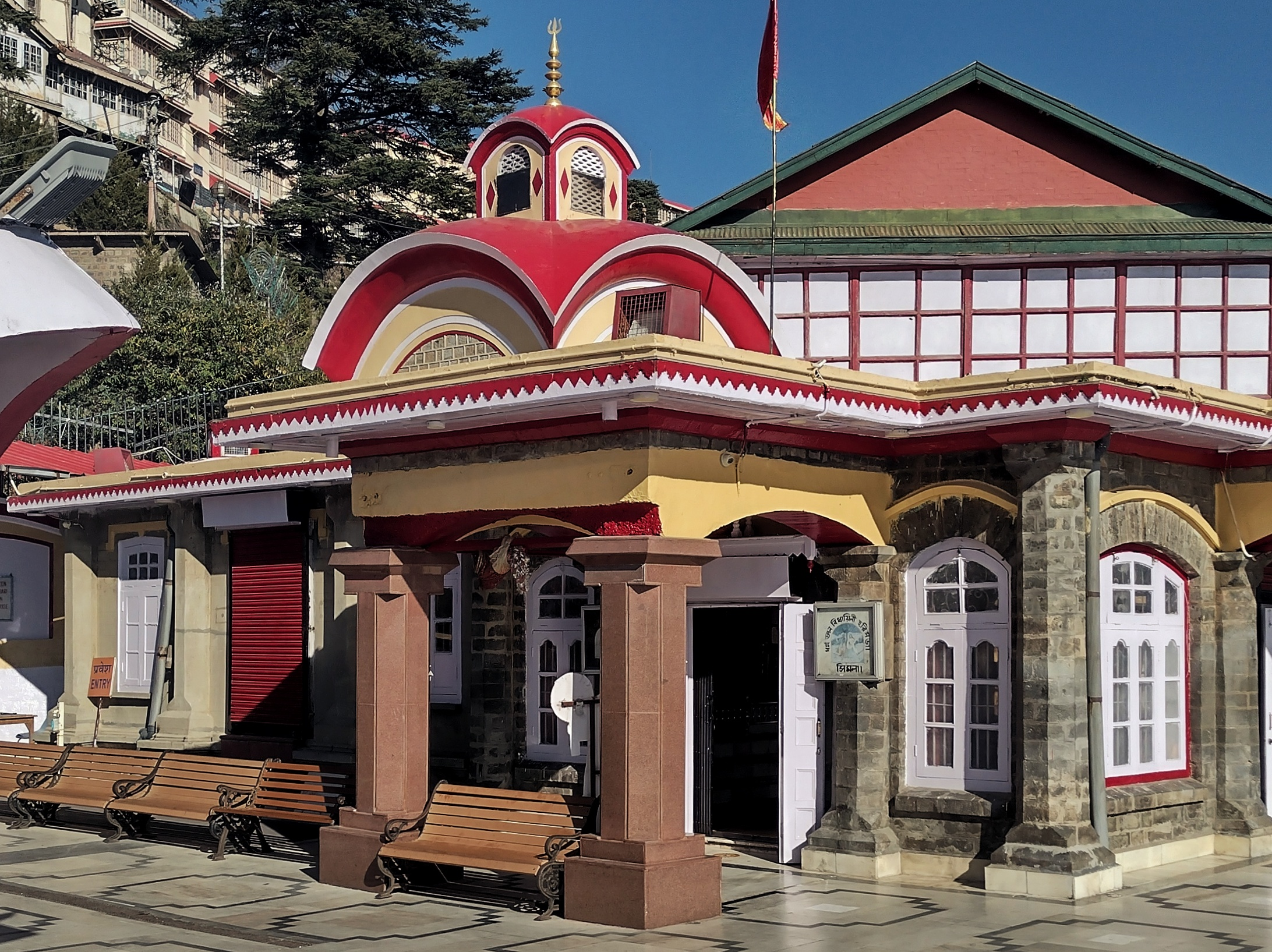
Kali Bari Temple in Shimla, after which Shimla is named

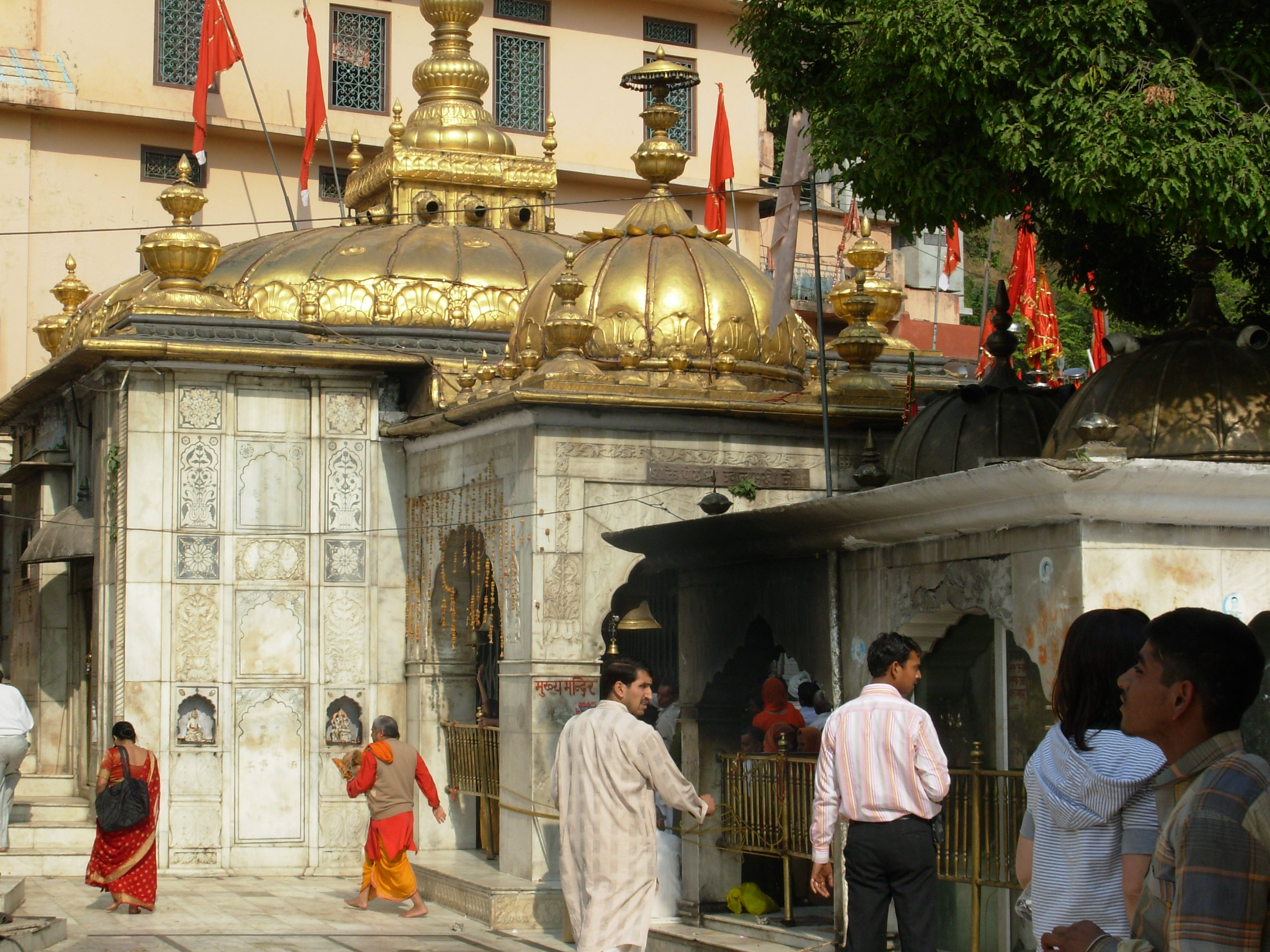
Jwalamukhi Temple in Kangra, one of the five Shaktipeethas in Himachal Pradesh

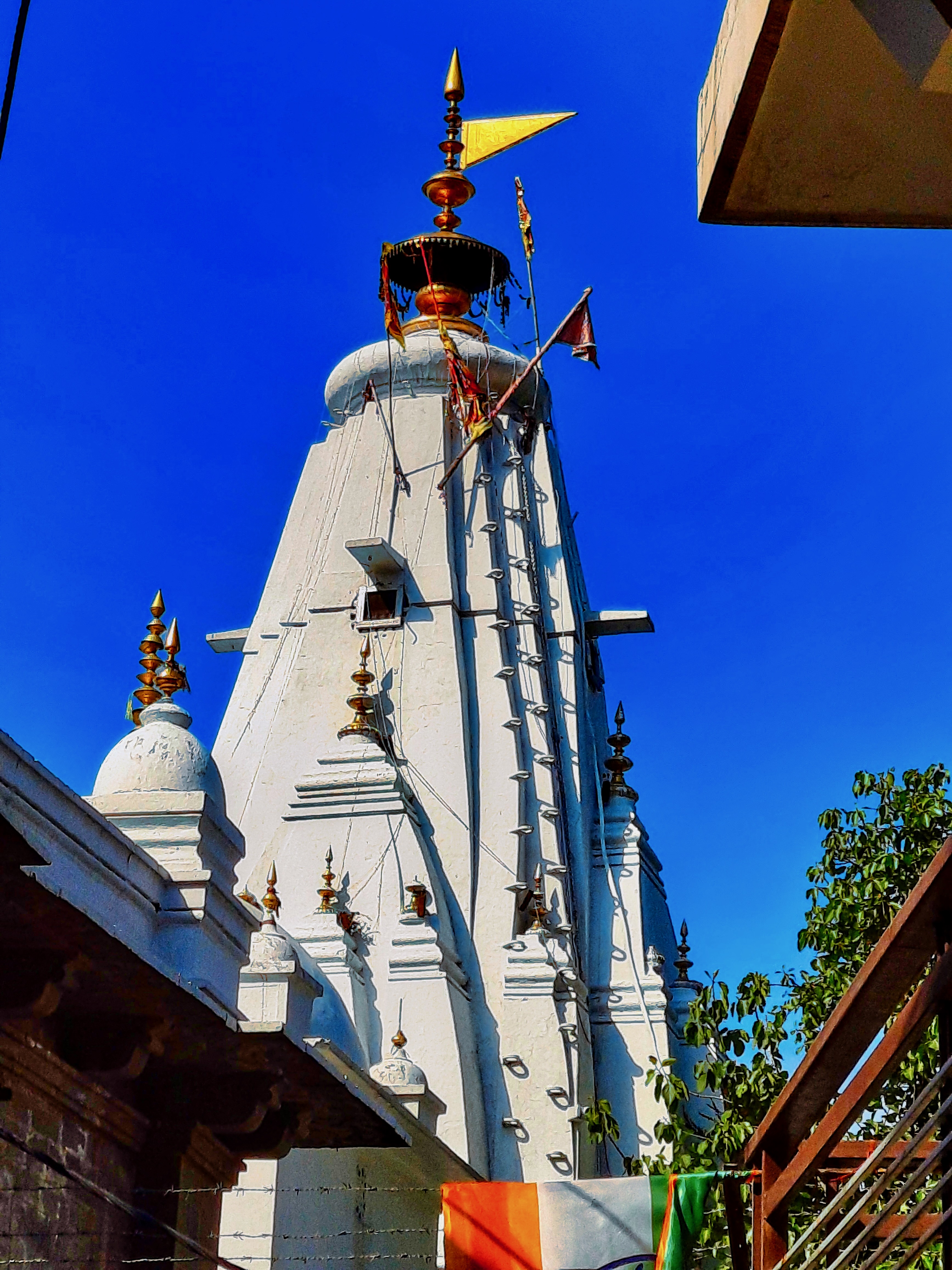
Bajreshwari Temple, one of the five Shaktipeethas in Himachal Pradesh

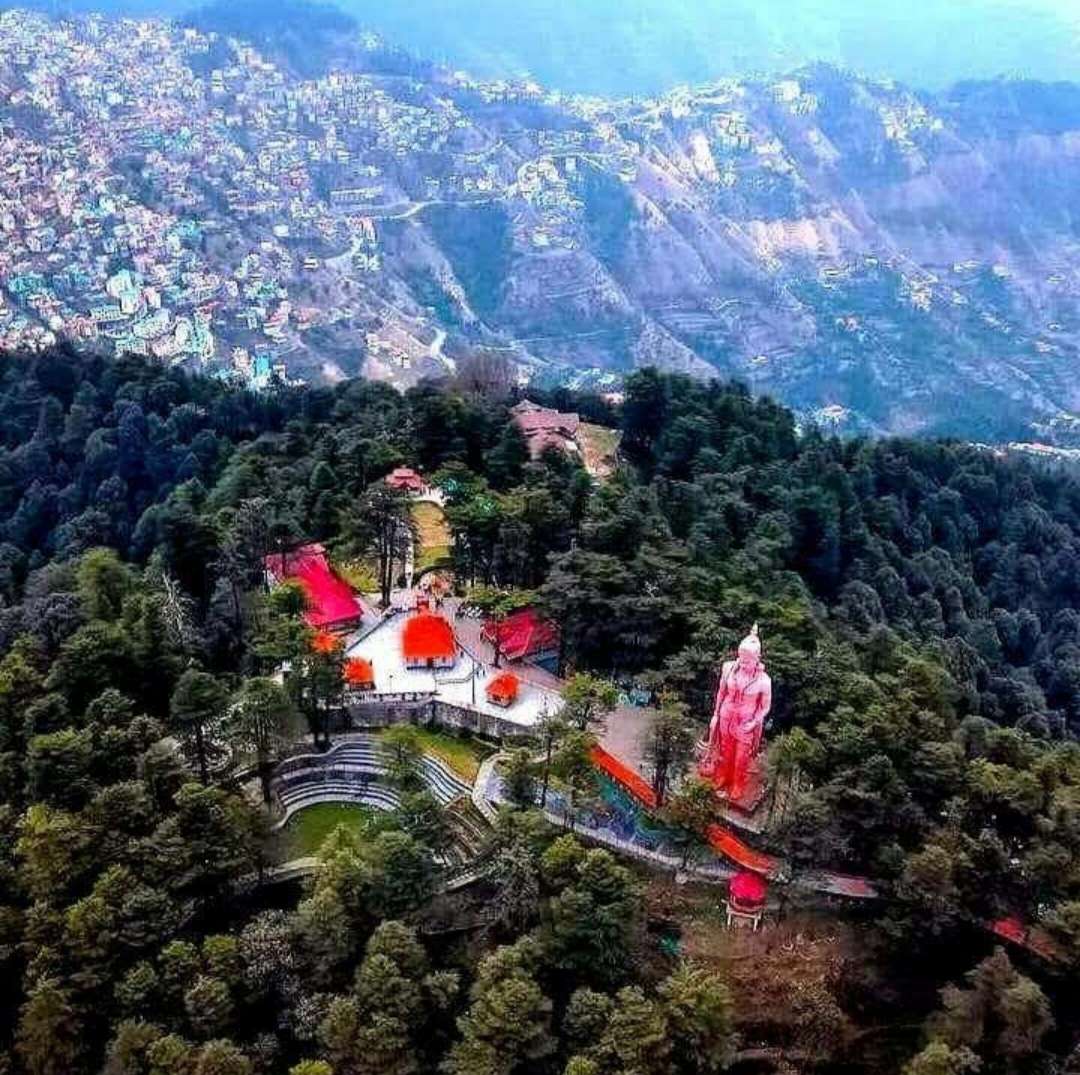
Jakhu Temple, Shimla

Hidimba Devi Temple

- Aadi Himani Chamunda, Kangra
- Baba Balak Nath
- Baglamukhi Temple, Bankhandi, Kangra
- Baijnath Temple, Baijnath
- Bajreshwari Mata Temple, Nagarkot, Kangra, Himachal Pradesh
- Banni Mata Temple, Chamba
- Bathu Temples, Kangra
- Bhalei Mata Temple, Chamba
- Bhimakali Mandir, Sarahan, Shimla
- Bijli Mahadev, Kullu, Himachal Pradesh
- Chaurasi Temple, Bharmour, Chamba
- Chaturbhuja Temple, Joginder Nagar, Mandi
- Chintpurni Mandir, Una
- Dhingu Mata Temple, Shimla
- Hatkoti Mandir, Rohru, Shimla
- Hidimba Devi Temple, Manali
- Jakhu Temple, Shimla
- Jwala Ji, Kangra
- Kali Bari, Shimla
- Kamna Devi Temple, Shimla
- Kamaksha Temple, Jaidevi, Mandi
- Lakshna Devi Temple, Bharmour, Chamba
- Maa Bhangayani Temple, Haripurdhar, Sirmaur
- Maa Simsa Temple, Ladbharol, Mandi
- Machindernath Temple, Joginder Nagar, Mandi
- Mamleshwar Mahadev, Karsog, Mandi
- Manikaran, Kullu
- Manimahesh Kailash Peak, Chamba, Himachal Pradesh
- Masrur Temples, Kangra
- Mata Kuan Rani Temple, Mandi
- Mindhal Mata Temple, Pangi valley, Chamba
- Naina Devi, Bilaspur
- Pohlani Mata Temple, Dalhousie, Chamba
- Raghunath Temple, Kullu
- Renuka Ji, Sirmaur
- Sankat Mochan Temple, Shimla
- Shali Mata Temple, Shimla
- Shandilya Rishi Mandir, Shalin village
- Shikari Devi Temple, Karsog, Mandi
- Shoolini Devi, Solan
- Shri Chamunda Devi Mandir, Kangra
- Shri Mahaveer Hanuman Mandir Khushala, Shimla
- Tara Devi Temple, Shimla
- Triloknath Temple, Lahaul and Spiti
- Triloknath Temple, Mandi
- Trilokpur Temple

== Jammu and Kashmir ==
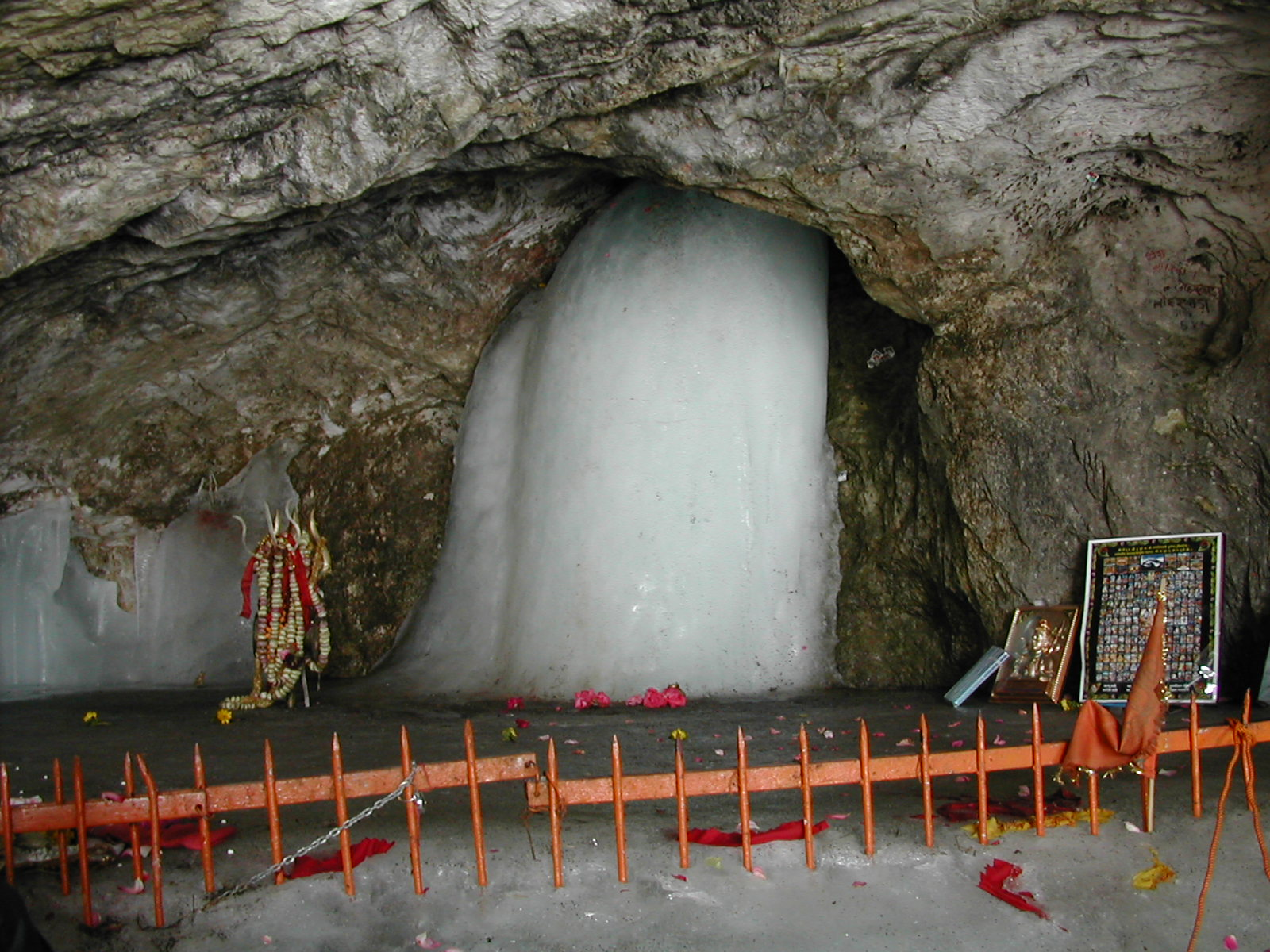
Ice Lingam at Amarnath Cave

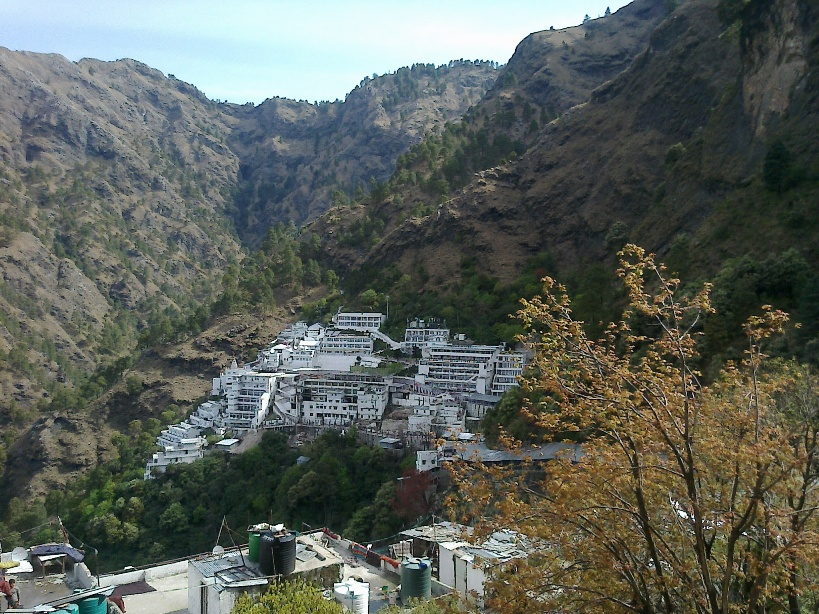
Vaishno Devi Temple

=== Jammu Division ===
- Raghunath Mandir, Jammu
- Vaishno Devi Temple, Katra

=== Kashmir Division ===
- Amarnath Cave Temple, Anantnag
- Hari Parbat, Srinagar
- Kheer Bhawani Temple , Ganderbal
- Khrew, Pulwama
- Martand Sun Temple, Anantnag
- Shankaracharya Temple, Srinagar

== Jharkhand ==
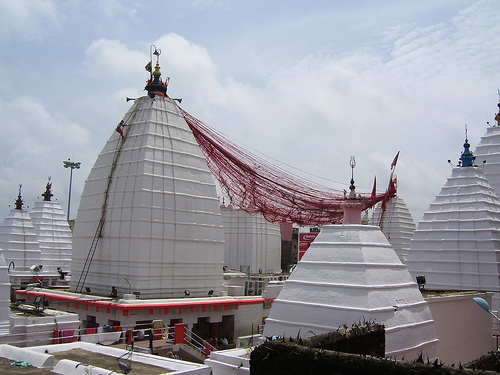
Baidyanath Temple

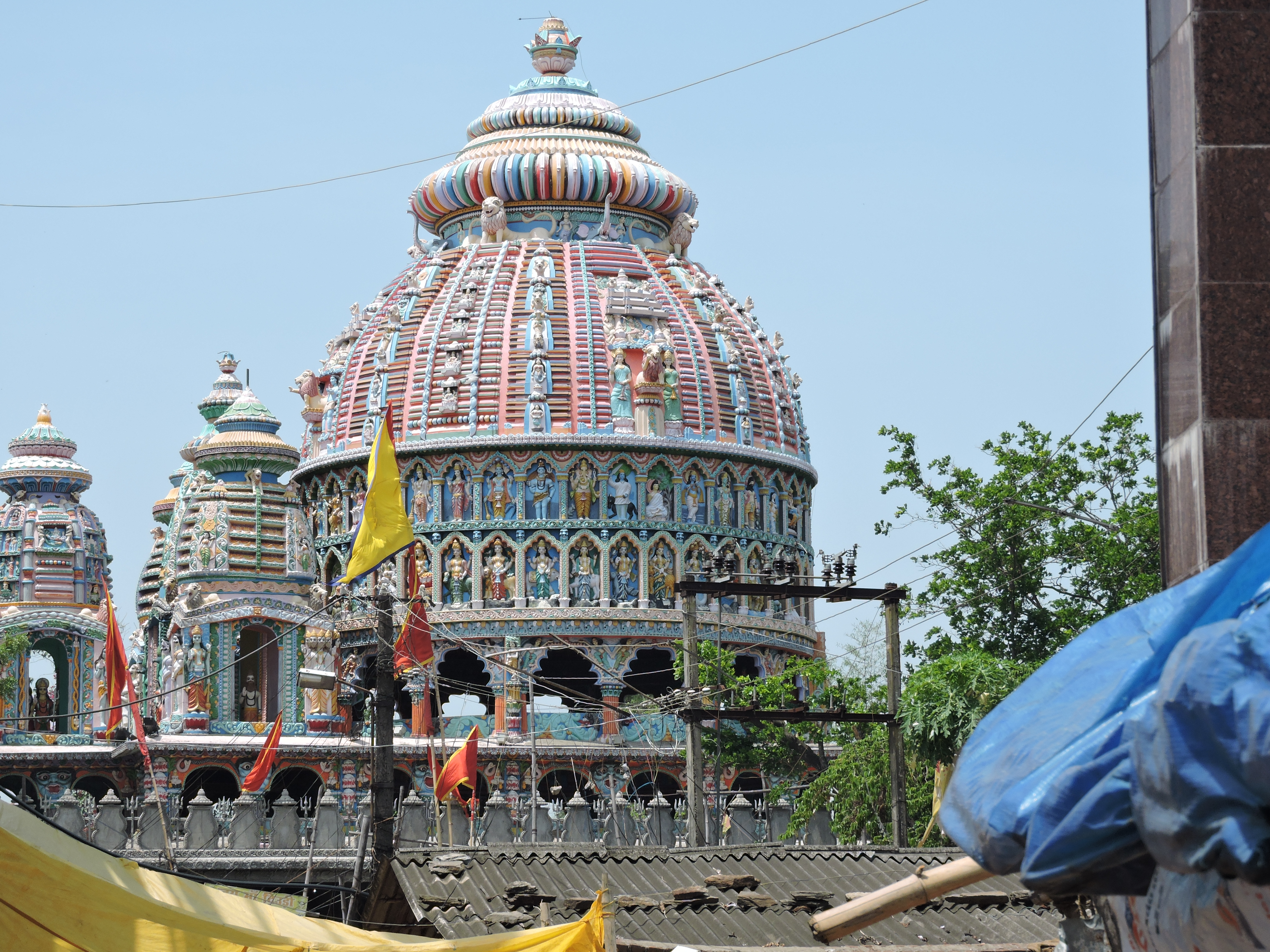
Maa Dewri Temple

Jagannath hill Temple

- Baidyanath Temple, Deoghar
- Basukinath Temple, Dumka
- Bindudham
- Chhinnamasta Temple, Rajrappa
- Gayatri Gyan Temple
- Harihar Dham
- Jagannath Temple
- Karneshwar Dham
- Maa Dewri Temple
- Maluti temples
- Shree Banshidhar Radhika Ji Mandir
- Sri Sri Kalika Maharani Temple

== Karnataka ==
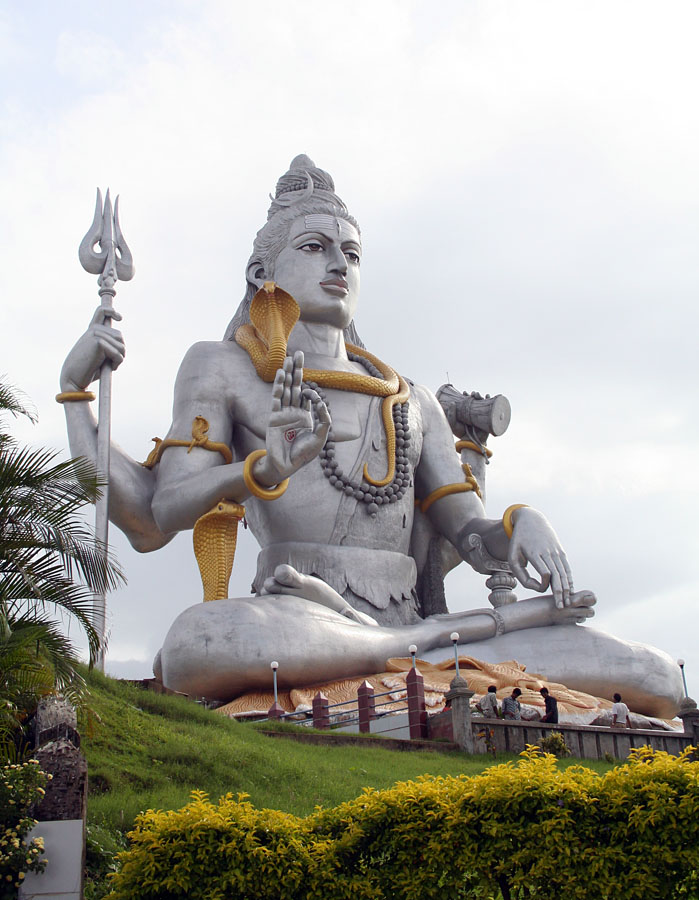
121 feet tall statue of Shiva at Murudeshwara

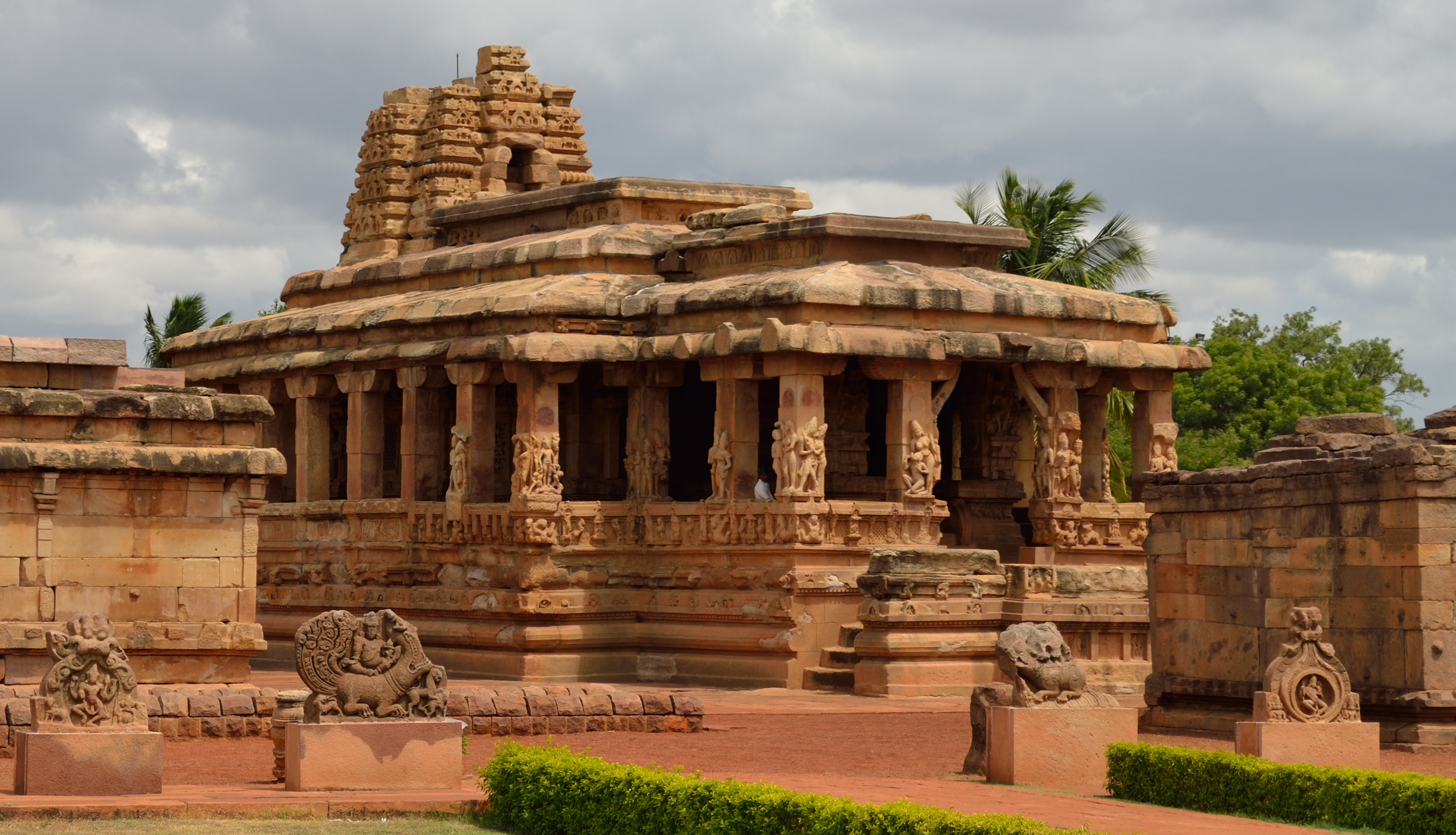
Durga temple, Aihole

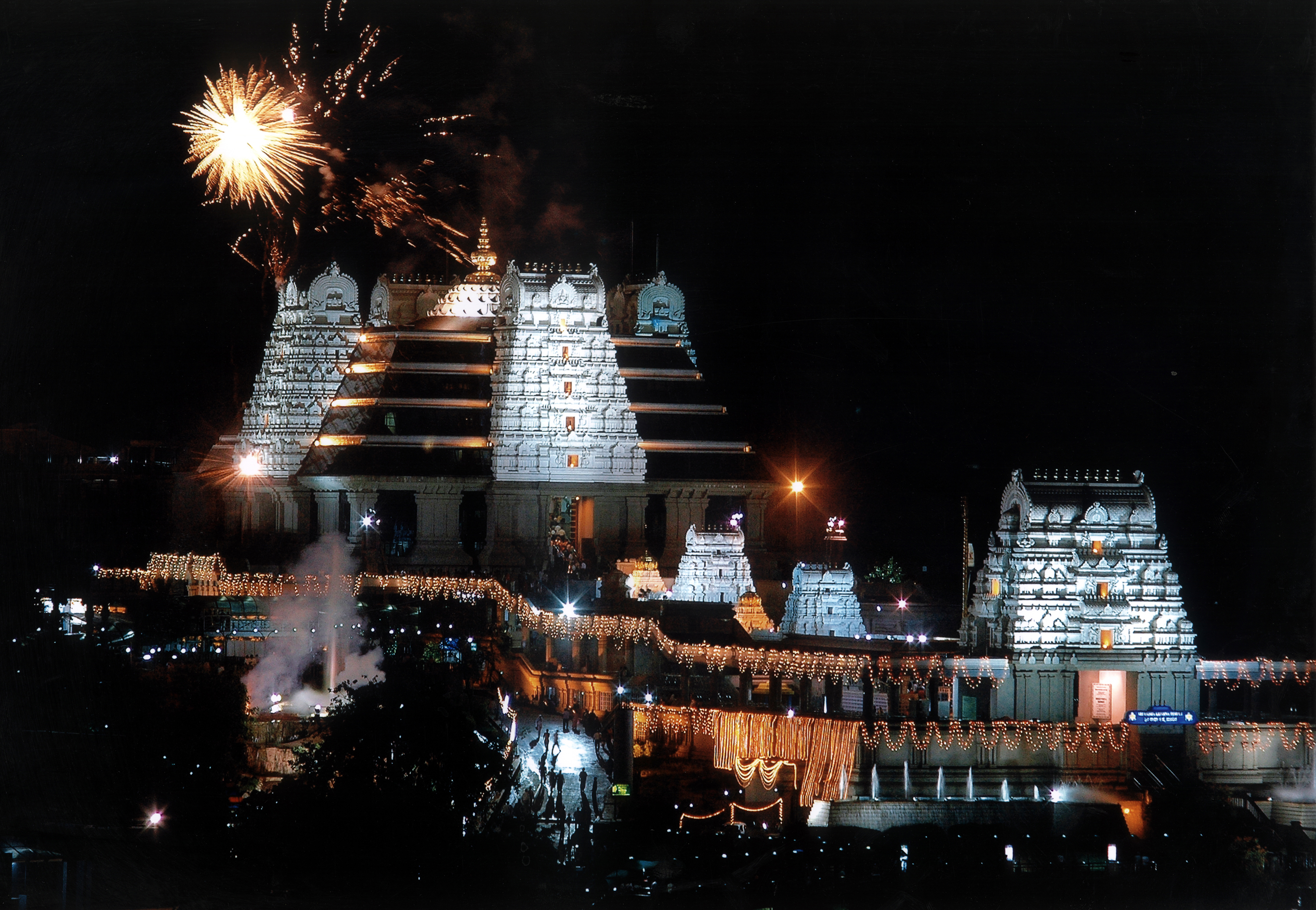
ISKCON Temple, Bengaluru

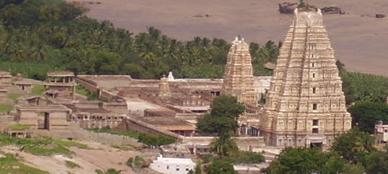
Virupaksha temple, Hampi

- Aihole
- Amrutesvara Temple, Amruthapura, at Amrutapura near Chikmagalur
- Annapoorneshwari Temple, Horanadu
- Badami cave temples
- Badami
- Bhoganandishwara Temple
- Bhutanatha group of temples, Badami
- Chamundeshwari Temple, Mysore
- Cheluvanarayana Swamy Temple, Melukote
- Chennakeshava Temple, Belur
- Chennakeshava Temple, Somanathapura
- Devarayanadurga
- Dharmaraya Swamy Temple, Bangalore
- Dharmasthala Temple, Dharmasthala
- Dodda Basavana Gudi
- Doddabasappa Temple, Dambal
- Domlur Chokkanathaswamy temple
- Gavi Gangadhareshwara Temple
- Ghati Subramanya Temple, Doddaballapur
- Gokarna
- Halebidu
- Hampi
- Hoysaleswara Temple
- ISKCON Temple, Bengaluru
- Jnanakshi Rajarajeshwari Temple, Bengaluru
- Kadri Manjunath Temple
- Kateel
- Kukke Subramanya Temple
- Lakshmi Narasimha Temple, Bhadravati
- Mahadeshwara Temple, Male Mahadeshwara Hills
- Mookambika temple, Kollur
- Nellitheertha Cave Temple
- Pattadakal
- Polali Rajarajeshwari Temple
- Ragigudda Anjaneya Temple
- Ranganathaswamy Temple, Srirangapatna
- Shree Vishnumurthy Temple
- Sirsi Marikamba Temple
- Sri Sai Mandir (Belagavi)
- Sri Venkataramana Temple, Karkala
- Srikanteshwara Temple, Nanjangud
- Sharadamba Temple, Sringeri
- Udupi Sri Krishna Matha, Udupi
- Virupaksha Temple, Hampi

== Kerala ==
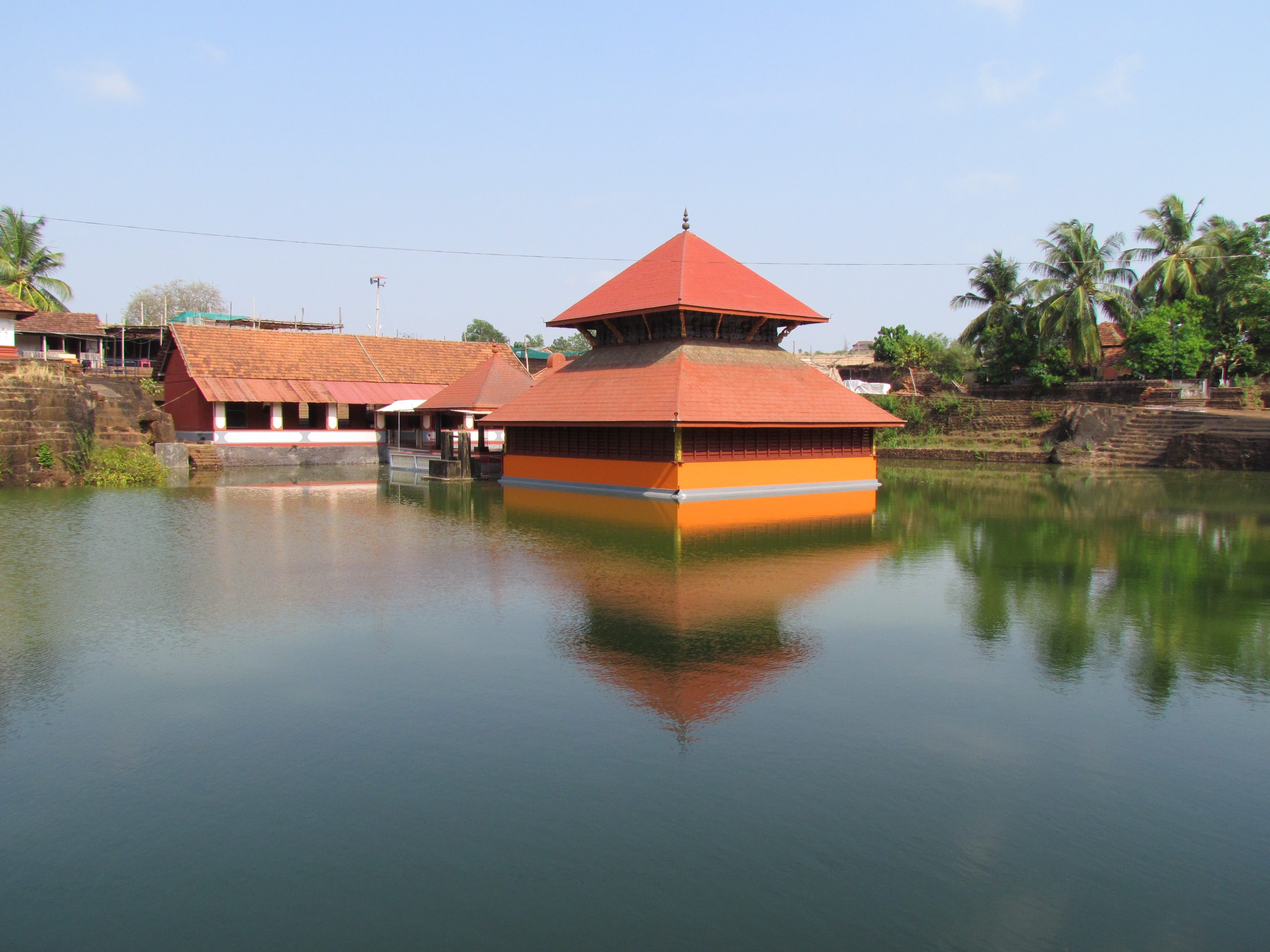
Ananthapura Lake Temple

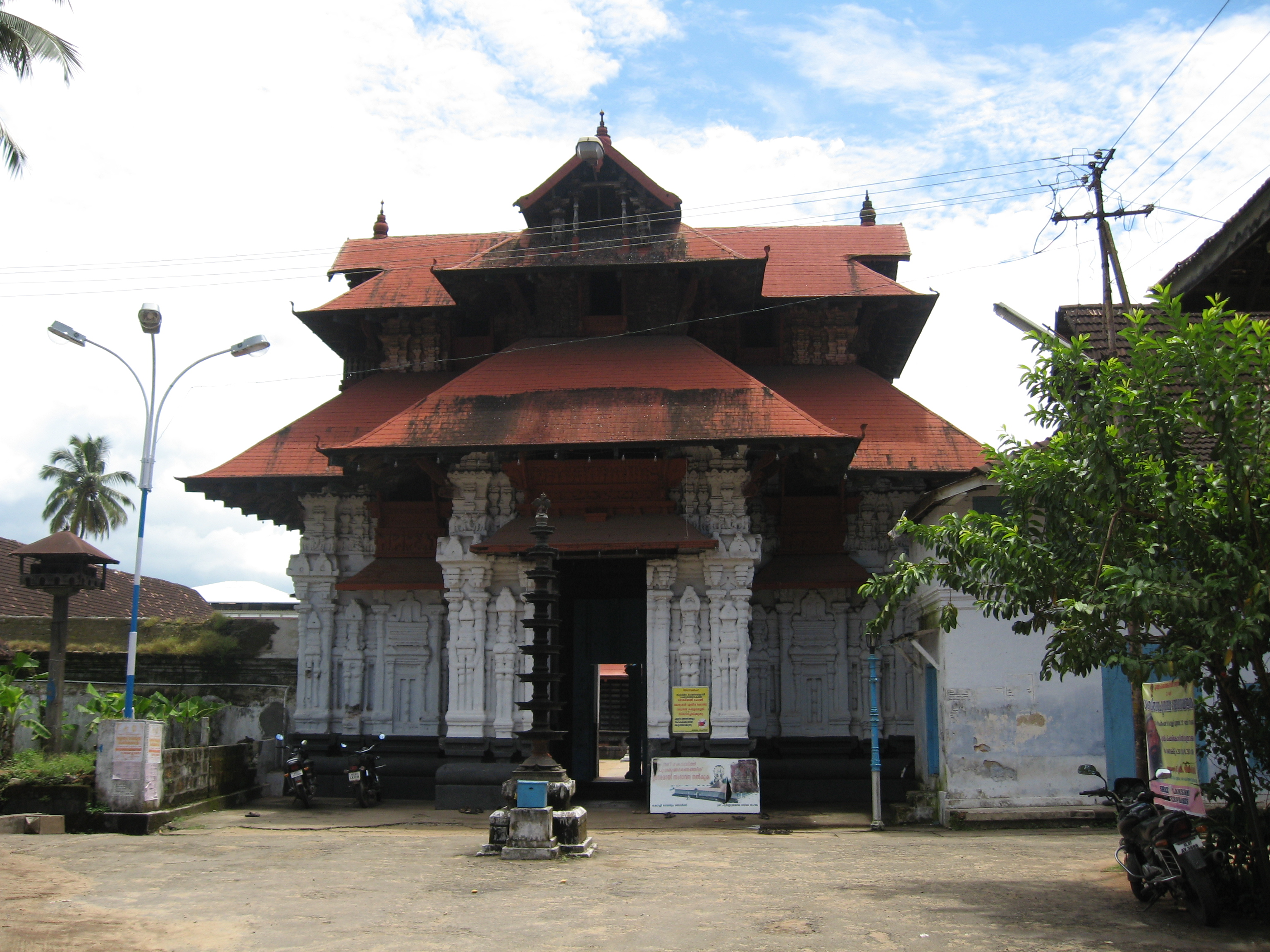
Sree Poornathrayeesa Temple

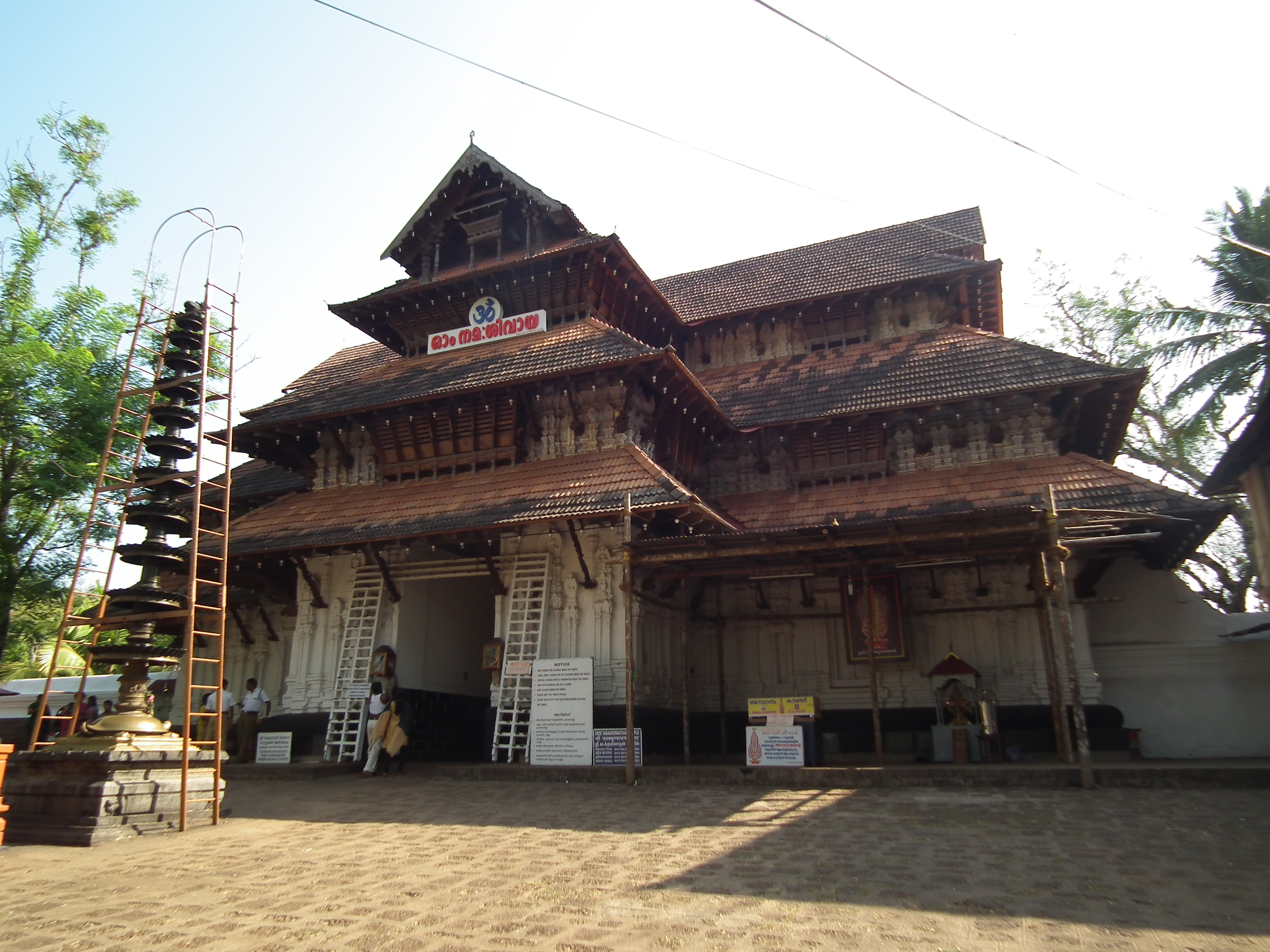
Vadakkumnathan Temple

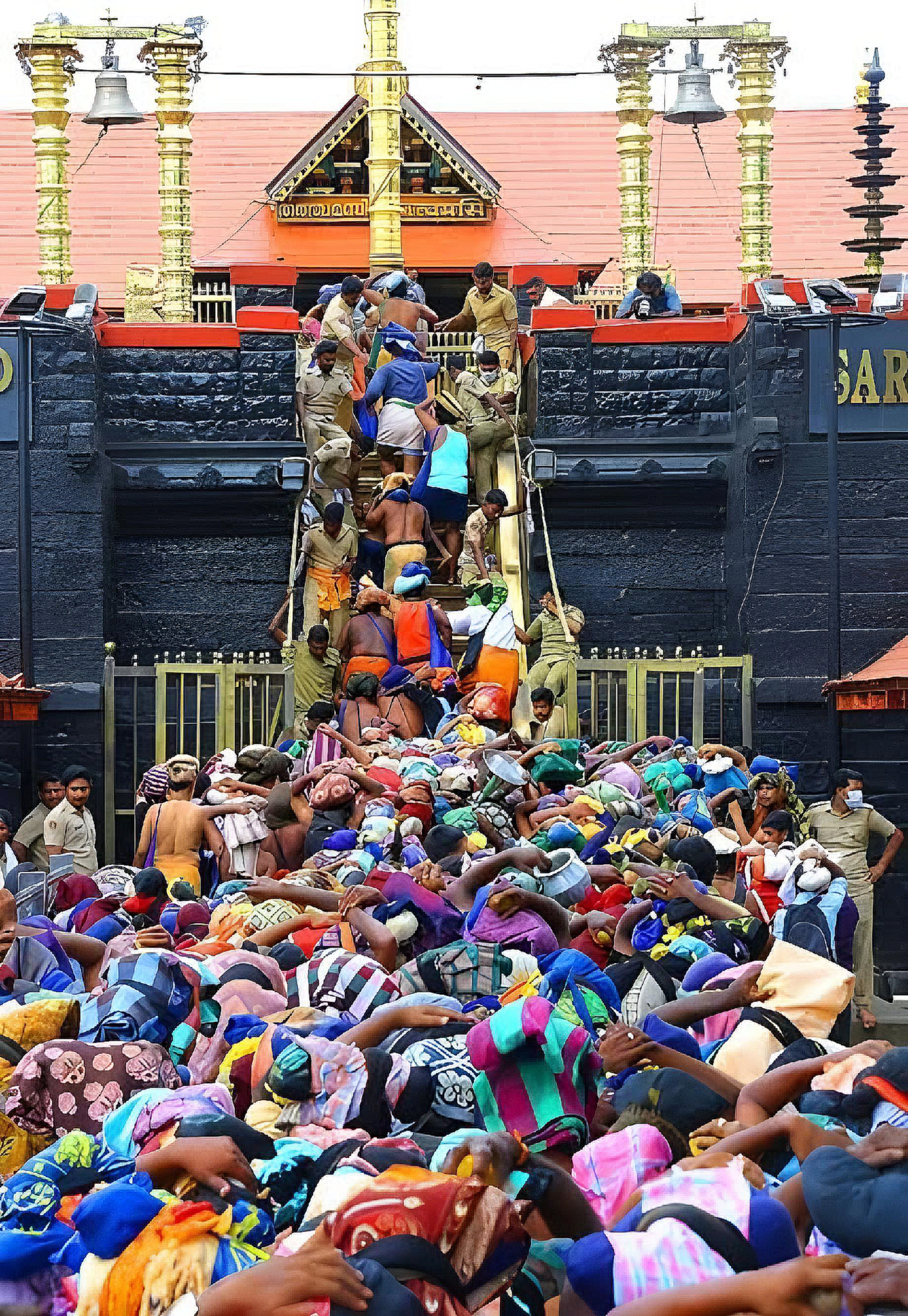
Sabarimala temple

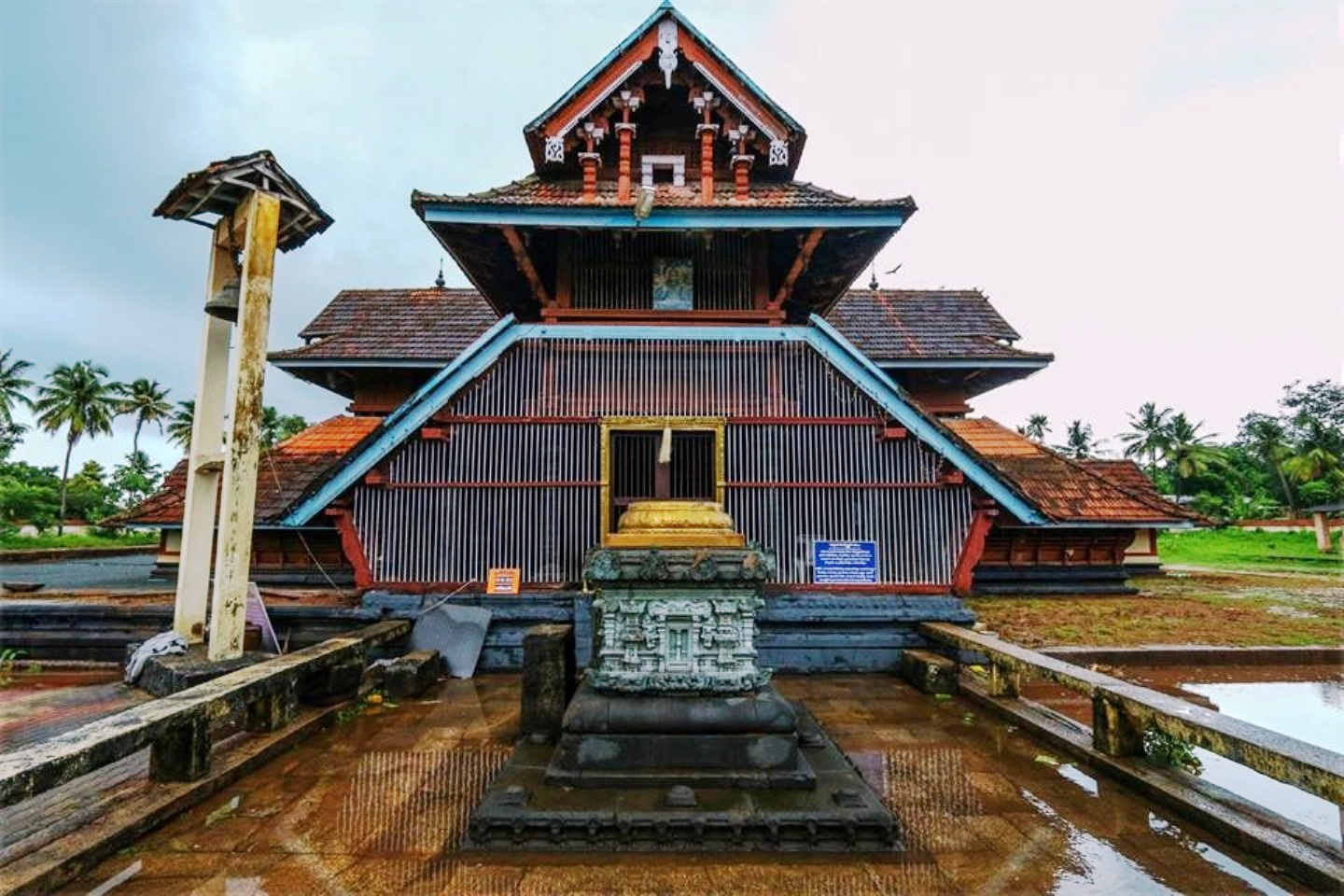
Vazhappally Temple

- Ambalappuzha Sree Krishna Swamy Temple
- Ananthapura Lake Temple
- Aranmula Parthasarathy Temple
- Arattupuzha Temple
- Attukal Temple
- Chakkulathukavu Temple
- Chettikulangara Devi Temple
- Chottanikkara Temple
- Ettumanoor Mahadevar Temple
- Ernakulam Shiva Temple
- Guruvayur Temple
- Kadampuzha Devi Temple
- Kanadikavu Shree Vishnumaya Kuttichathan Swamy temple
- Kodungallur Sree Kurumba Bhagavathy Temple
- Koodalmanikyam Temple
- Kottiyoor Temple
- Lokanarkavu Temple
- Mannarasala Snake Temple
- Muthappan Temple
- Oachira Temple
- Padmanabhaswamy Temple
- Parumala Valiya Panayannarkavu Devi Temple
- Payammal Shatrughna Temple
- Pazhavangadi Ganapathy Temple
- Peruvanam Mahadeva Temple
- Pisharikavu, Koyilandy
- Rajarajeshwara Temple
- Sabarimala Temple
- Sree Poornathrayeesa Temple
- Sreenarayanapuram Temple
- Tali Shiva Temple
- Thirumoozhikkulam Lakshmana Perumal Temple
- Thirunakkara Sree Mahadevar Temple
- Thrikodithanam Mahavishnu Temple
- Thirumandhamkunnu Temple
- Thirunelli Temple
- Thiruvanchikulam Temple
- Thriprayar Temple
- Thirunavaya Navamukunda Temple
- Vadakkunnathan Temple
- Vaikom Sree Mahadeva Temple
- Valayanad Devi Temple
- Vazhappally Maha Siva Temple

== Madhya Pradesh ==
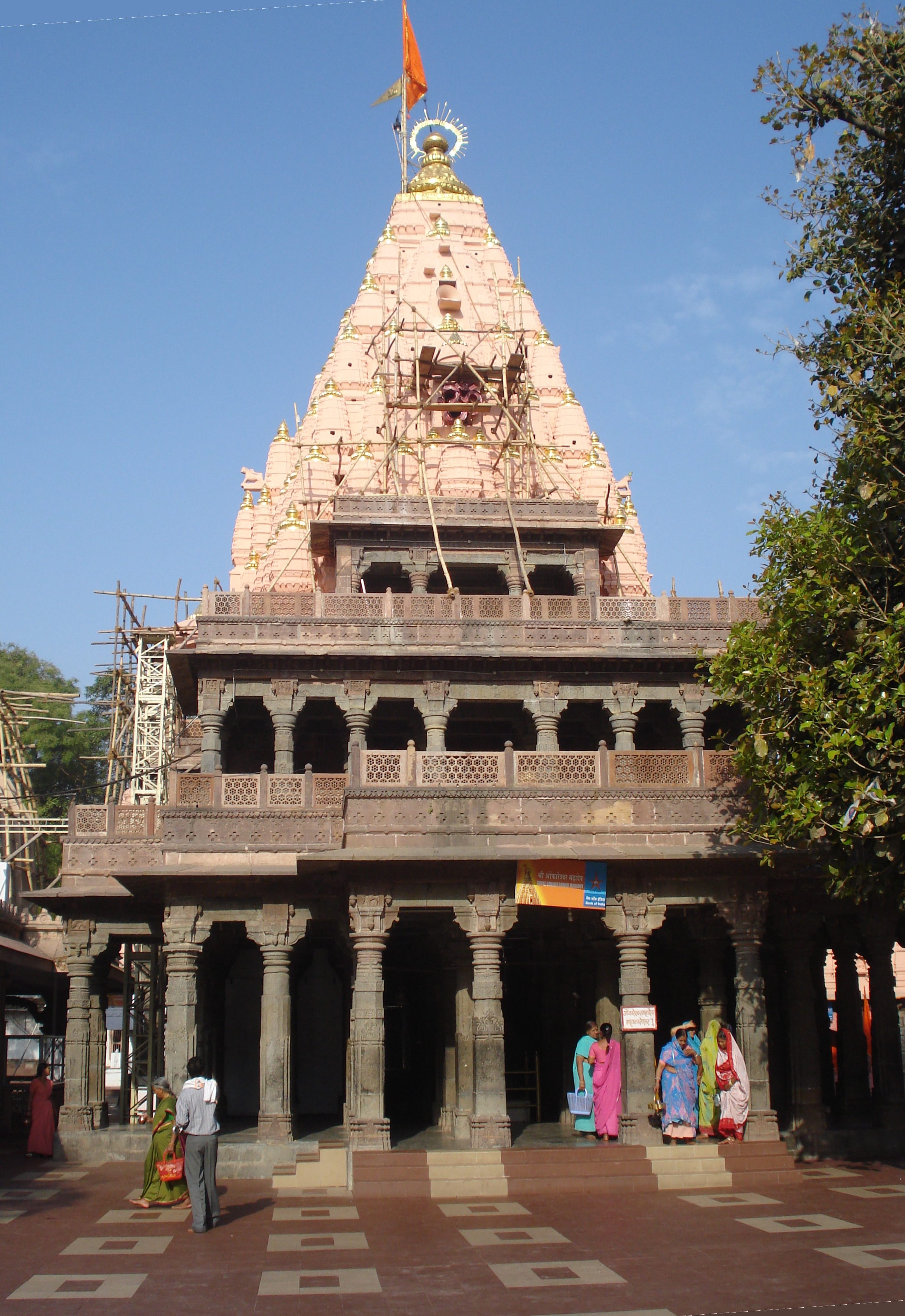
Mahakaleshwar Jyotirlinga

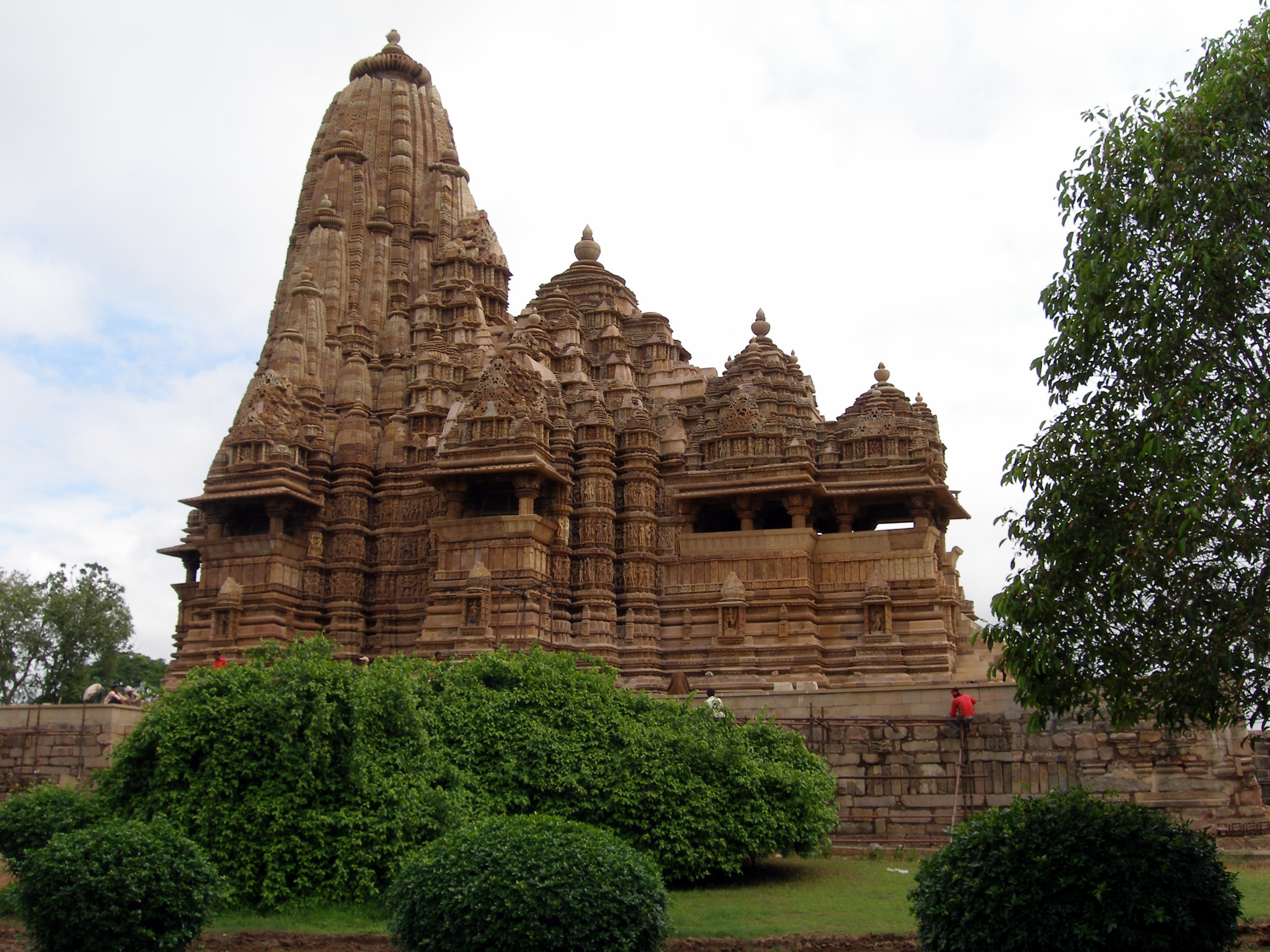
Kandariya Mahadeva Temple, Khajuraho

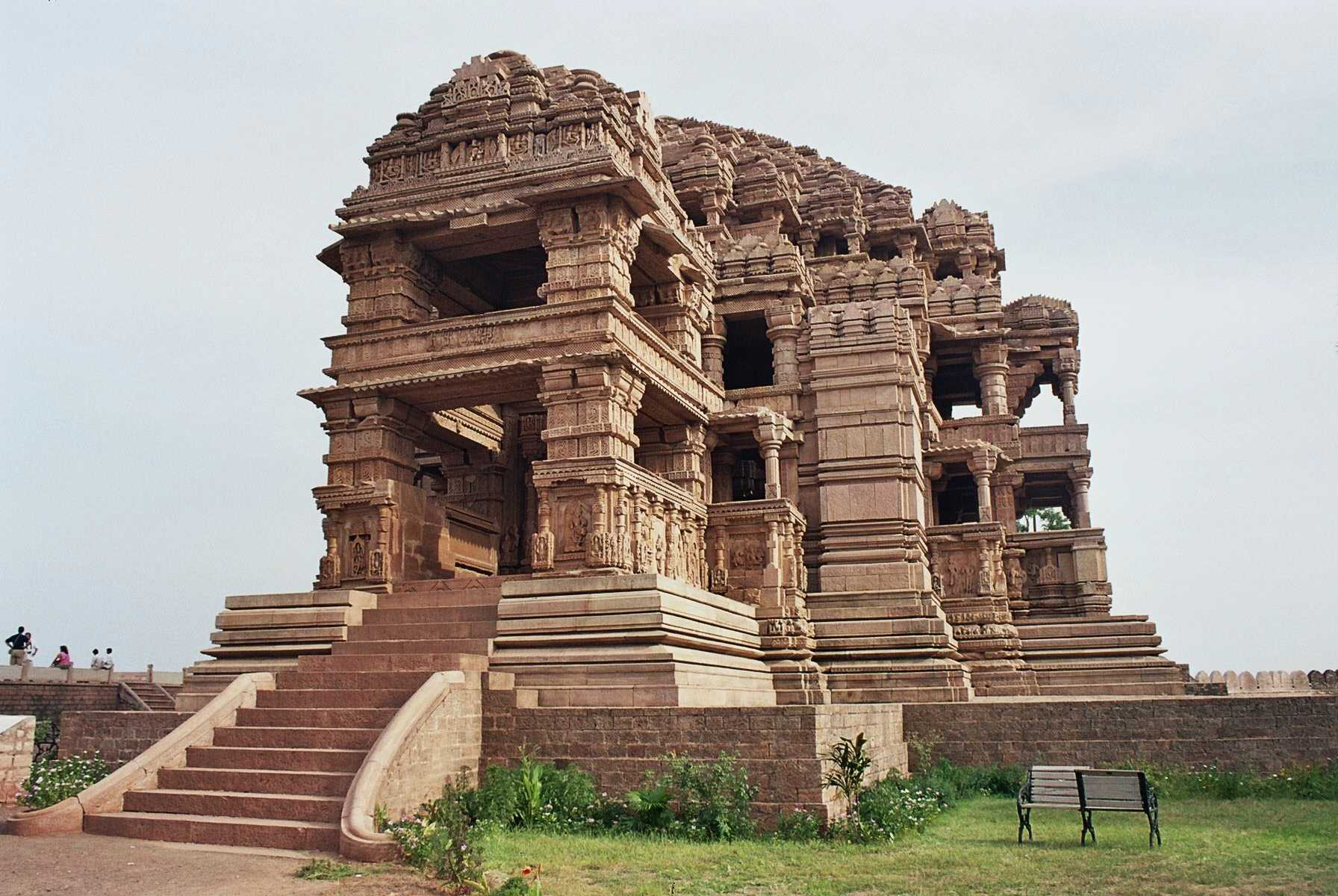
Sas-Bahu Temple, Gwalior

- Baba Baijnath Temple, Agar
- Bagalamukhi Temple, Nalkheda
- Bhojeshwar Temple
- Bijasan Mata Temple, Indore
- Chaturbhuj Temple (Orchha), Orchha
- Chintaman Ganesh Temple, Ujjain
- Dada Darbar, Khandwa
- Devi Jagadambi Temple, Khajuraho
- Devi Vaishini Temple, Dewas
- Gajanan Maharaj Temple, Indore
- Jatashankar, Pachmarhi
- Kal Bhairav Temple, Ujjain
- Kandariya Mahadeva Temple
- Khajrana Ganesh Temple, Indore
- Khajuraho Group of Monuments
- Lakshmi Narayan Temple, Bhopal
- Mahakaleshwar Jyotirlinga Ujjain
- Sharda Devi Temple Maihar satna
- Mohas Hanuman Mandir
- Omkareshwar Temple
- Pashupatinath Temple, Mandsaur
- Pitambara Peeth, Datia
- Ram Raja Temple, Orchha near Jhansi
- Sasbahu Temple, Gwalior
- Shri Kala Bhairava Nath Swami Temple, Adegaon
- Shyam Kaka Temple, Rajgarh district
- Siddhwat Temple, Ujjain
- Kankali Devi temple, Tigawa
- Tulsi Peeth, Chitrakoot

== Maharashtra ==
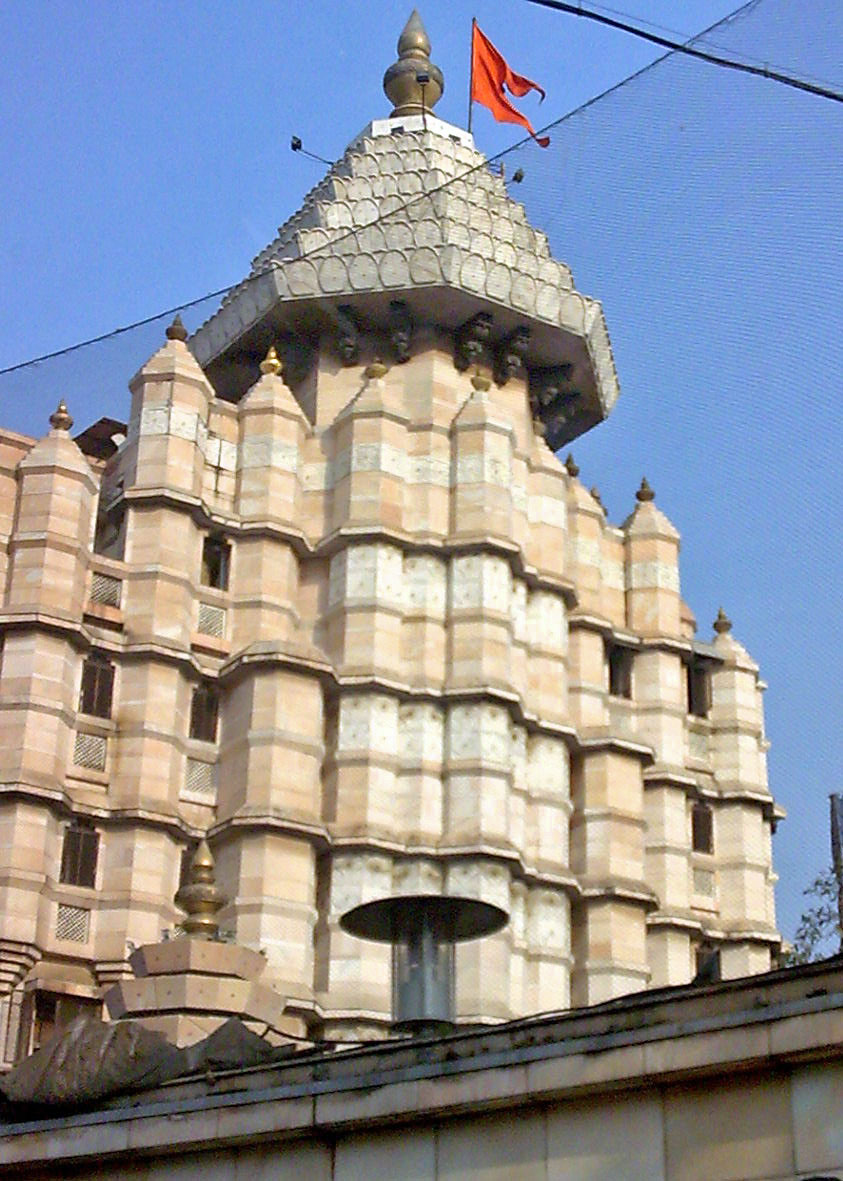
Siddhivinayak Temple

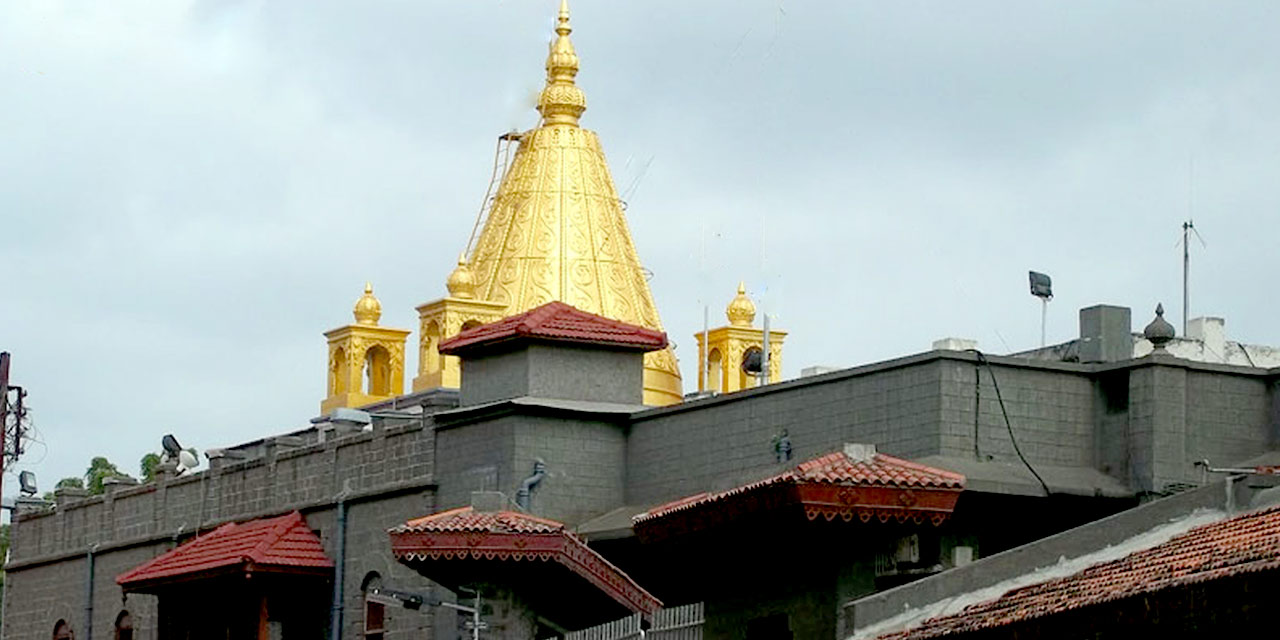
Shri Sai Baba Temple, Shirdi

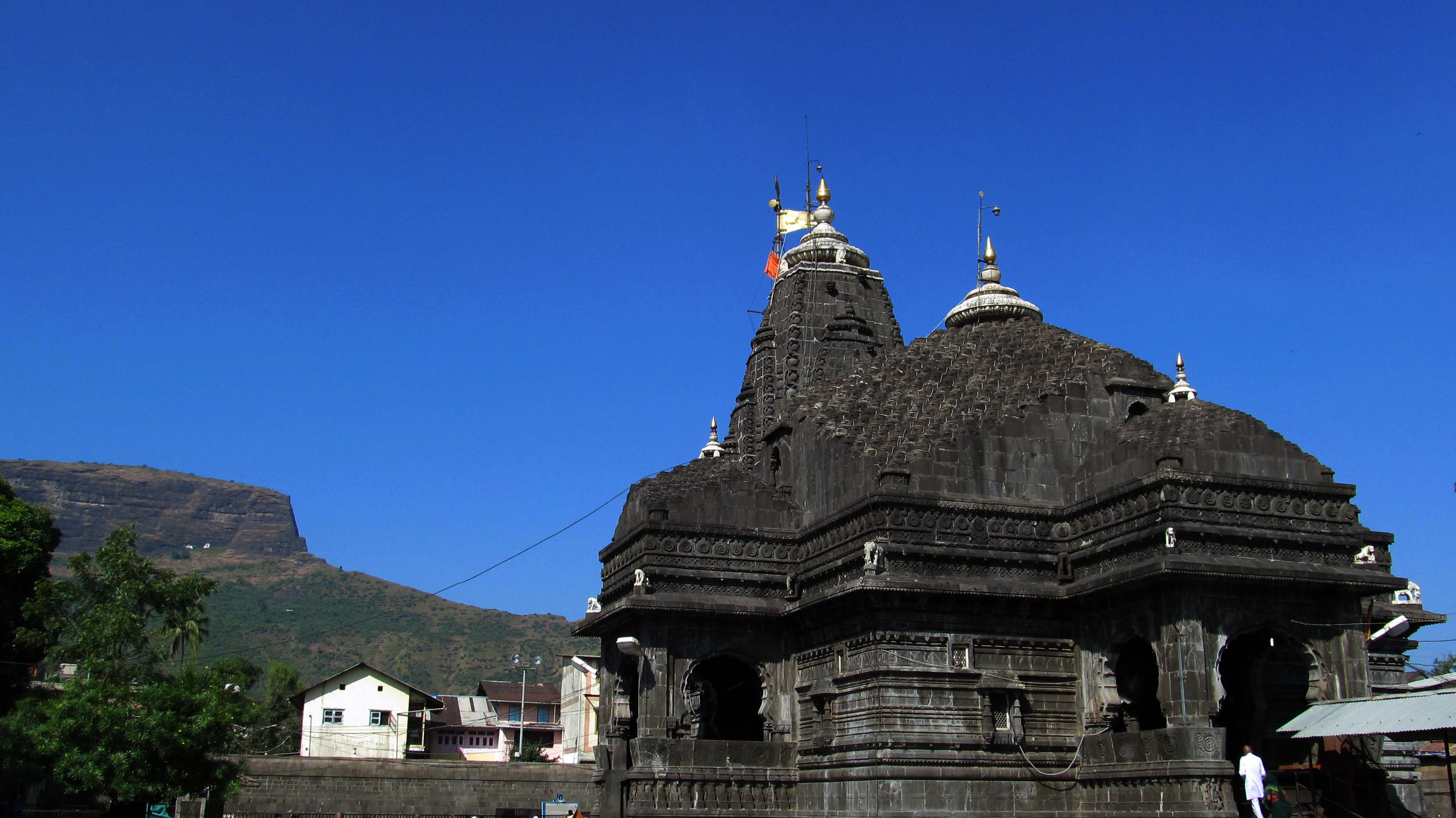
Trimbakeshwar Shiva Temple

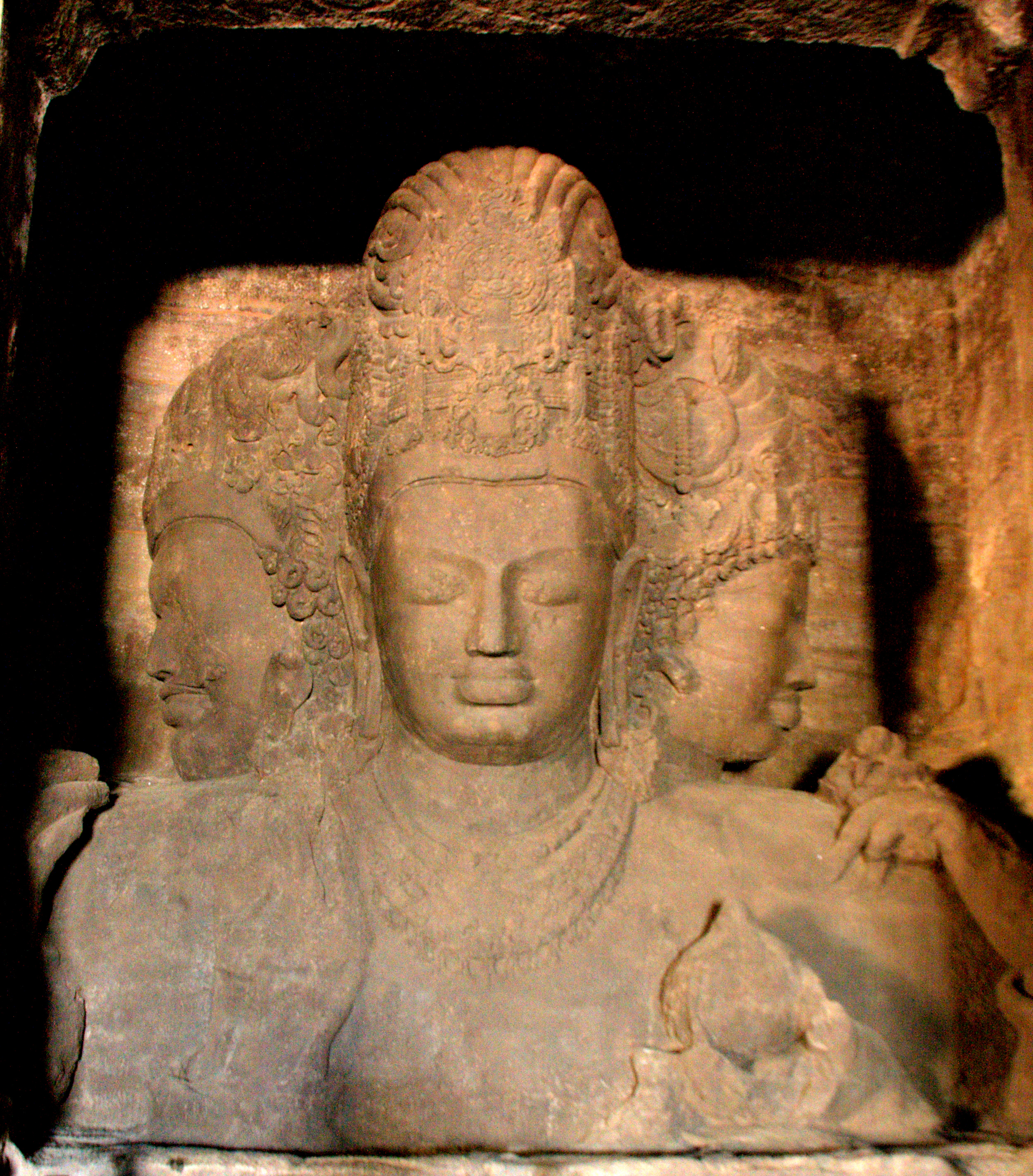
Trimurti sculpture, Elephanta Caves

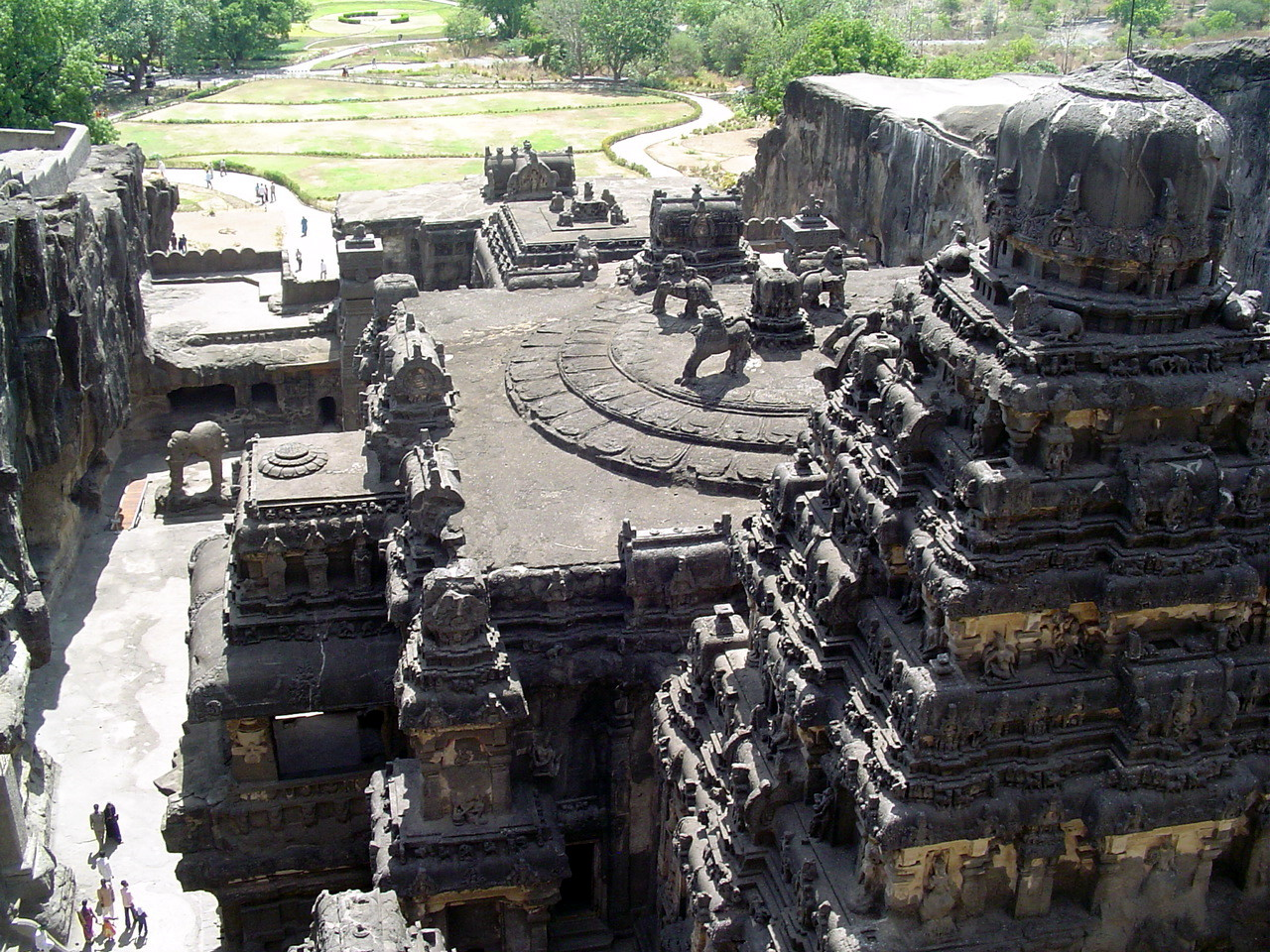
Kailasa temple, Ellora Caves

- Akkalkot Swami Samarth
- Ambreshwar Temple, Ambarnath
- Hiranyakeshi temple, Amboli, Sindhudurg
- Amruteshwar Temple, Ratanwadi
- Aundha Nagnath Temple, Hingoli
- Babulnath Temple, Mumbai
- Ballaleshwar Pali
- Bhagwant Temple, Barshi
- Bhimashankar Temple
- Bhuleshwar Temple
- Birla Mandir, Shahad
- BAPS Shri Swaminarayan Mandir, Ambegaon
- Red Jogeshwari Temple, Pune
- Chakreshwar Mahadev Mandir, Nalasopara
- Chandika Devi Temple, Juchandra
- Chaturshringi Temple, Pune
- Chintamani Temple, Theur
- Dagadusheth Halwai Ganapati Temple, Pune
- Dashabhuja Temple, Pune
- Durgadi Fort Temple, Kalyan
- Ekvira Mata Mandir, Lonavala
- Elephanta Caves, near Elephanta Island, Mumbai
- Kailash Temple at Ellora
- Ganapati Temple, Redi
- Moreshwar Temple, Morgaon
- Ganpati Temple, Tasgaon
- Ganpatipule, Ratnagiri
- Girijatmaj Temple of Lenyadri
- Gondeshwar Temple, Sinnar
- Nagra Temple, Gondia
- Grishneshwar temple, Ellora
- Harihareshwara Temple
- Harishchandragad, Ahmednagar district
- Palasnath Temple, Indapur
- ISKCON Temple, Pune
- Jivdani Mata Temple, Virar
- Jogeshwari
- Jyotiba Temple at Wadi
- Kala Ram Temple, Nashik
- Kasba Ganapati, Pune
- Khandoba Mandir, Beed
- Khandoba Temple, Jejuri
- Khidkaleshwar Mandir, Dombivli
- Kopineshwar Mandir, Thane
- Kukdeshwar Temple
- Mahalakshmi Temple, Dahanu
- Mahalakshmi Temple, Kolhapur
- Mahalakshmi Temple, Mahalakshmi, Mumbai
- Mahur Renuka Mata Temple
- Mandher Devi Temple in Mandhradevi
- Mankeshwar temple, Zodage
- Markanda Mahadev, Chamorshi
- Morya Gosavi Temple, Chinchwad
- Mumba Devi Mandir, Mumbai
- Mumbra Devi Temple, Mumbra
- Narsobawadi
- Padmalaya
- Parshuram Temple, Chiplun
- Parvati Hill, Pune
- Pataleshwar Caves, Pune
- Prabhadevi Temple, Prabhadevi, Mumbai
- Ram Mandir, Mumbai
- Mahaganpati Temple of Ranjangaon
- Saptashrungi
- Sarasbaug Ganpati
- Satpuda Manudevi Temple, Adgaon
- Shani Shingnapur
- Shri Sai Baba Temple, Shirdi, Shirdi
- Shiv Mandir, Maharashtra
- Shree Swaminarayan Temple Mumbai
- Shri BrahmaChaitanya Gondavalekar Maharaj, Gondavale
- Shri Dev Rameshwar Mandir
- Shri Laxmi Narsimha Temple, Nira Narsingpur
- Shri Laxmi Narsimha Temple, Nira Narsingpur, Pune
- Shri Swaminarayan Mandir, Mumbai
- Siddheshwar & Ratneshwar Temple
- Siddhivinayak Mahaganapati Temple
- Siddhivinayak Temple, Mumbai
- Siddhivinayak Temple, Siddhatek
- Tryamboli Temple Temblaiwadi, Kolhapur
- Trimbakeshwar Shiva Temple, Trimbakeshwar
- Tulja Bhavani Temple, Tuljapur
- Tulshibaug, Pune
- Vajreshwari Temple, Vajreshwari
- Varadvinayak
- Vigneshwara Temple, Ozar
- Vithoba Temple, Pandharpur

== Manipur ==
- Ningthoukhong Gopinath Mandir
- Shree Govindajee Temple, Imphal
- Shri Radha Raman Temple of Kanchipur, Kanchipur

== Meghalaya ==
- Nartiang Durga Temple, West Jaintia Hills district

== Odisha ==
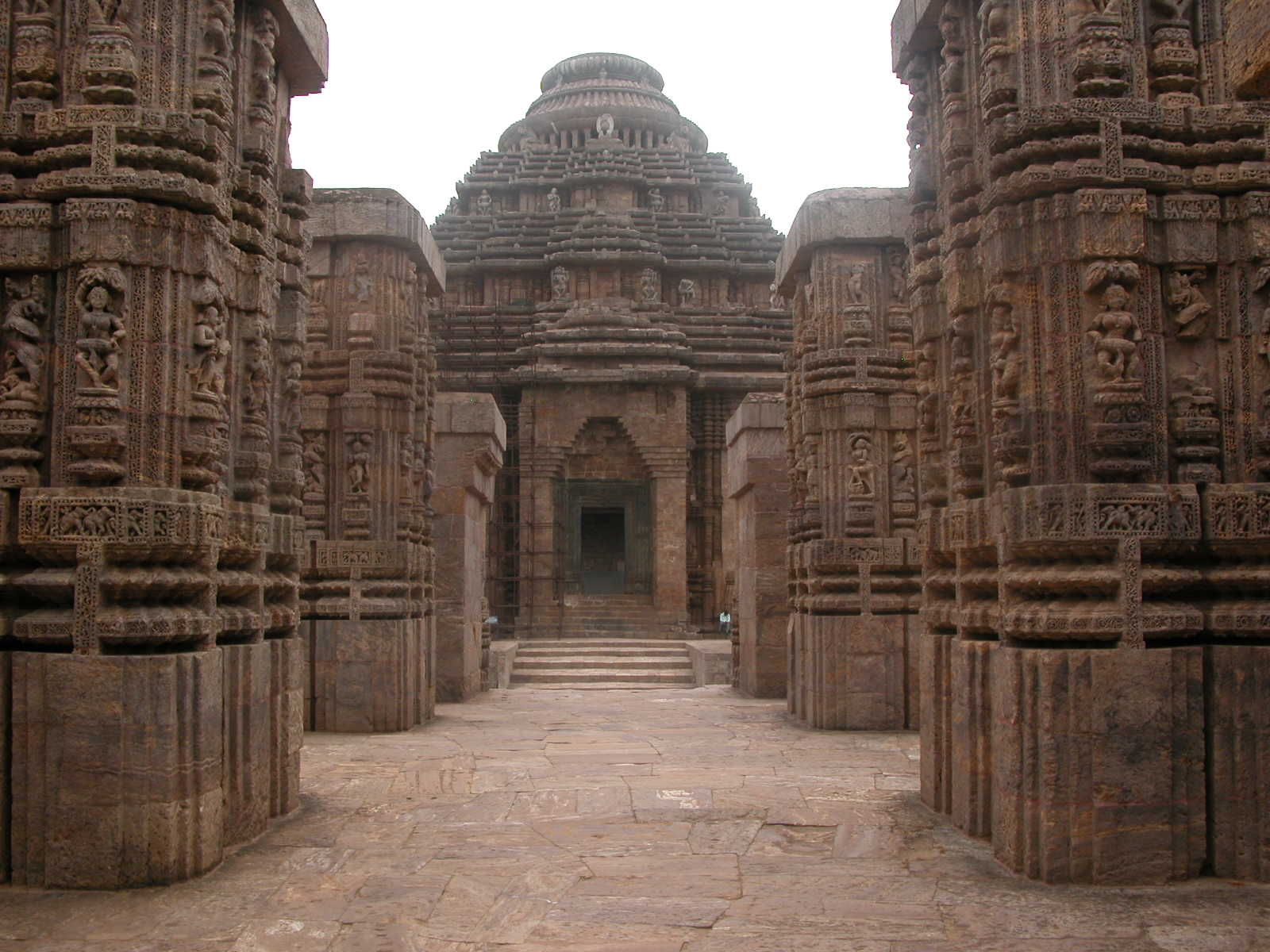
Konark Sun Temple

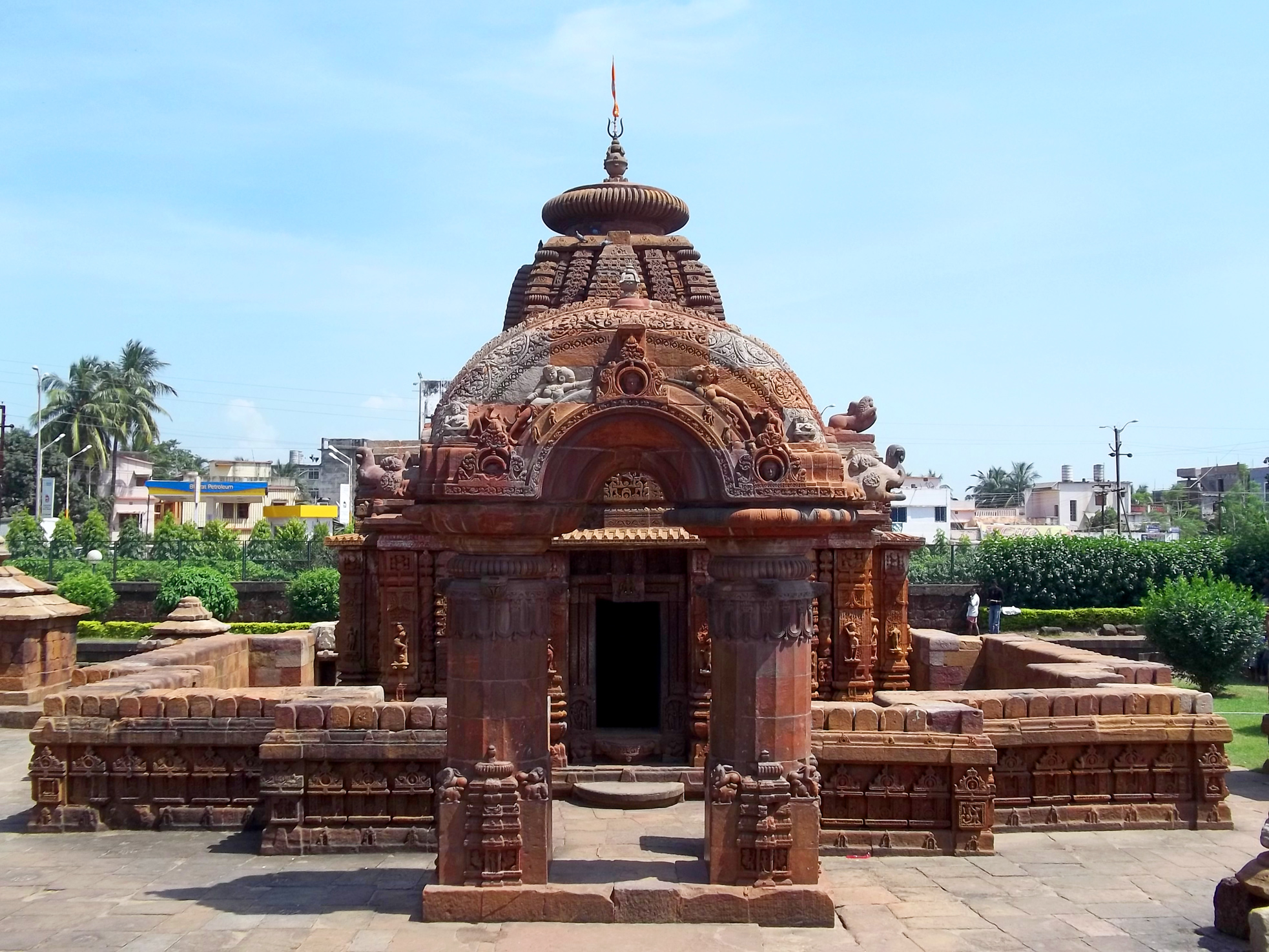
Muktesvara deula Panoramic View, Orissa

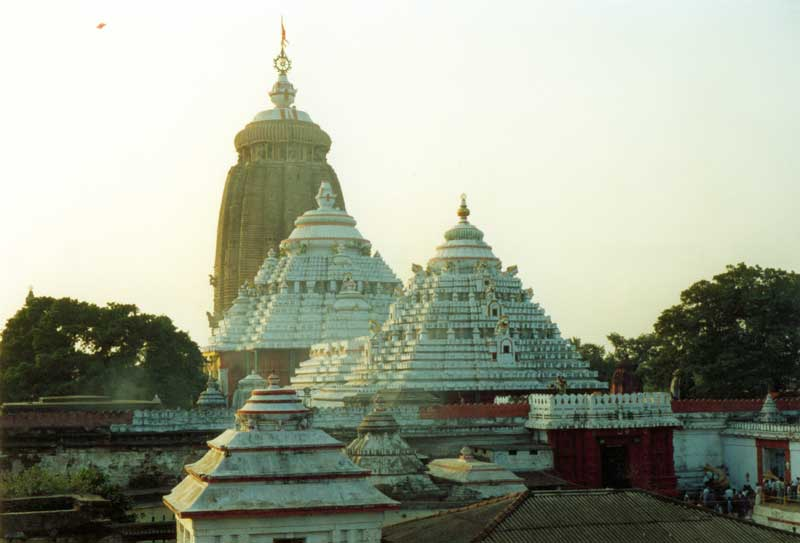
Jagannath Temple, Puri Panoramic View, Orissa

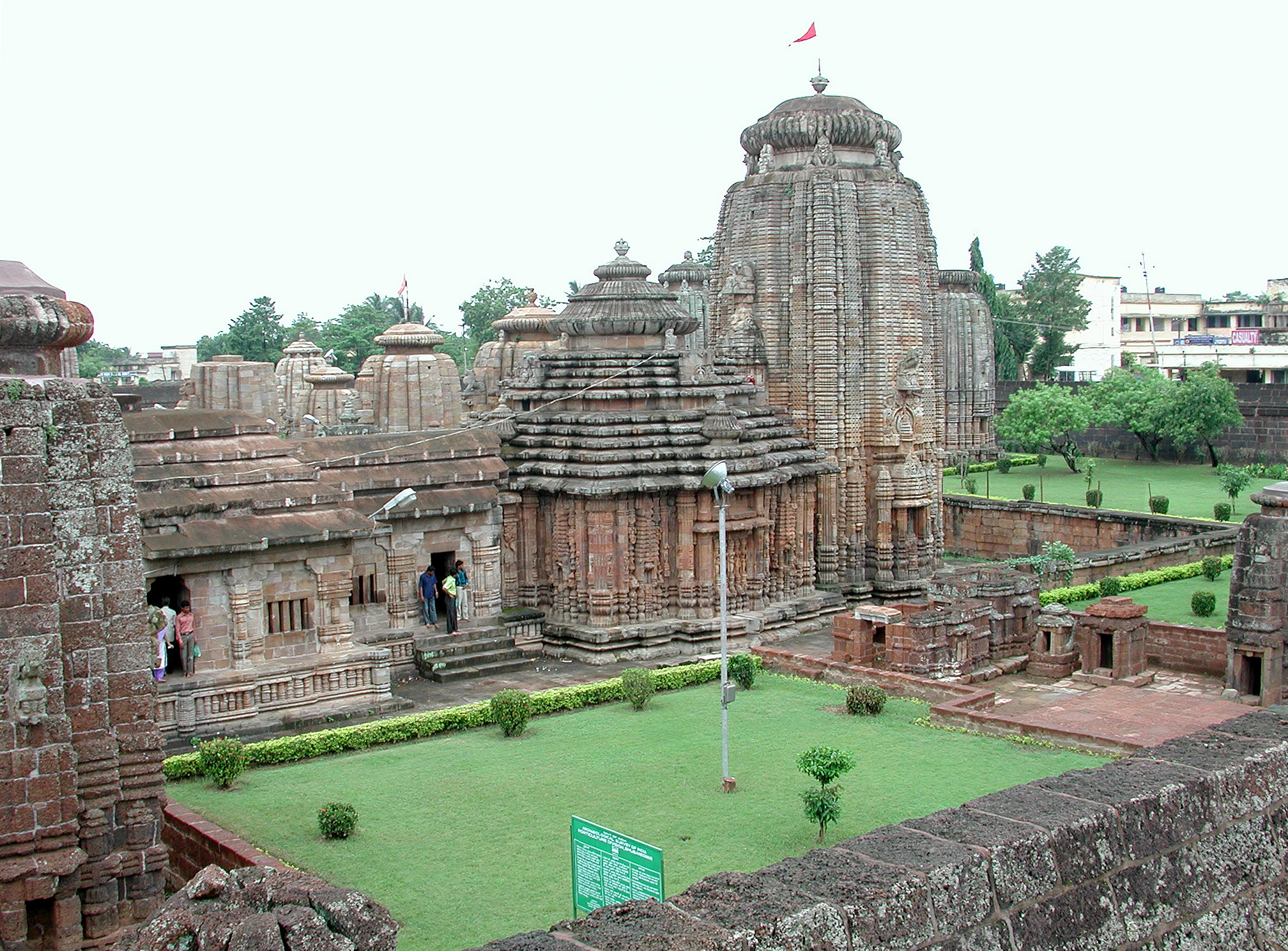
Lingaraja Temple Panoramic View, Orissa

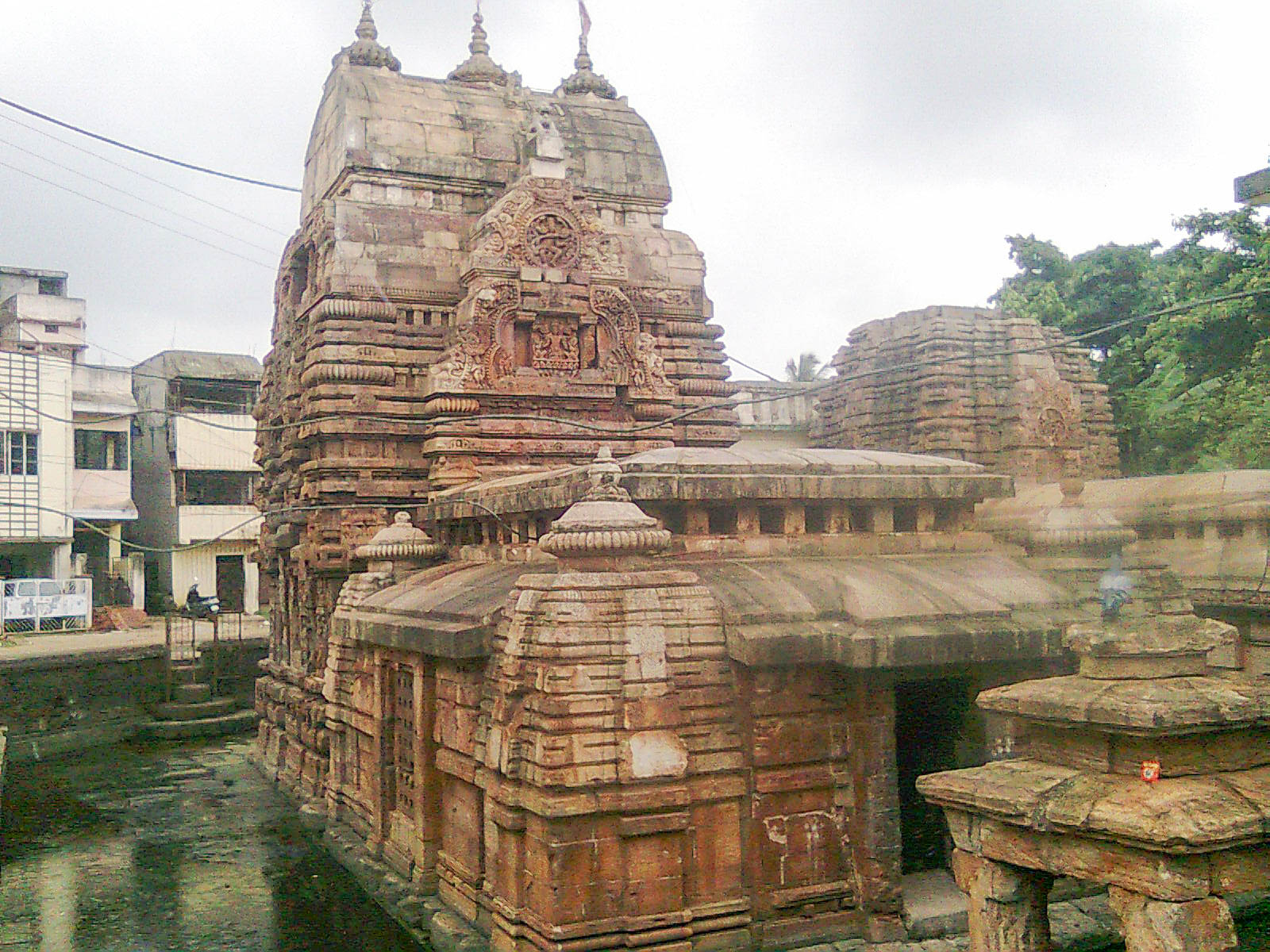
Baitala deula Panoramic View, Orissa

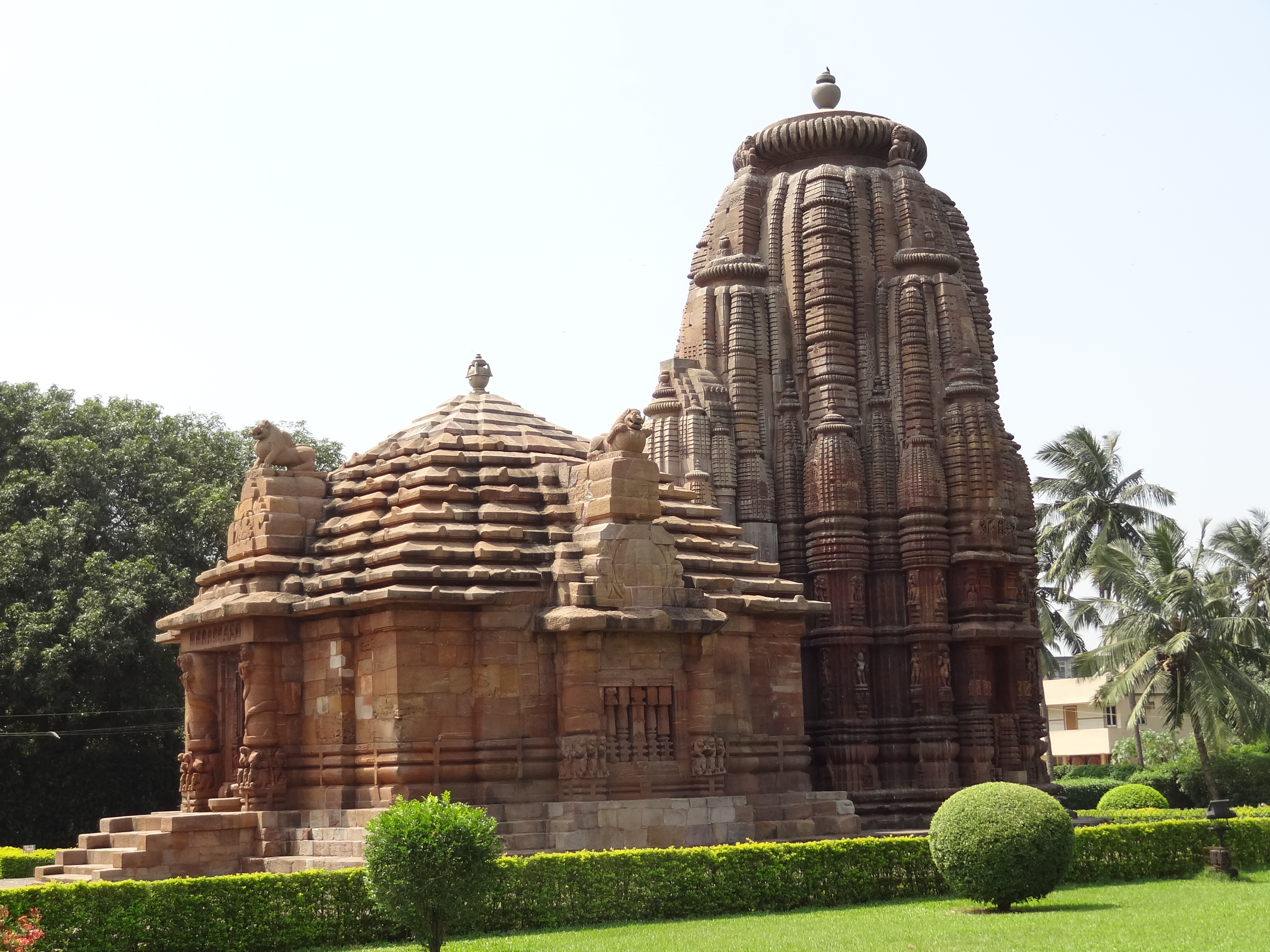
Rajarani Temple Panoramic View, Orissa

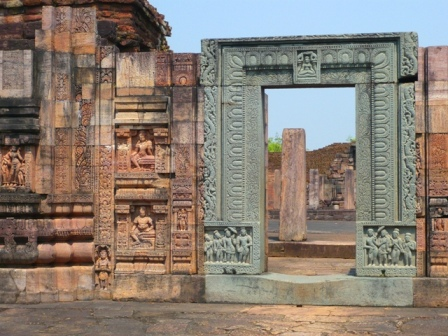
Puspagiri Mahavihara, Orissa

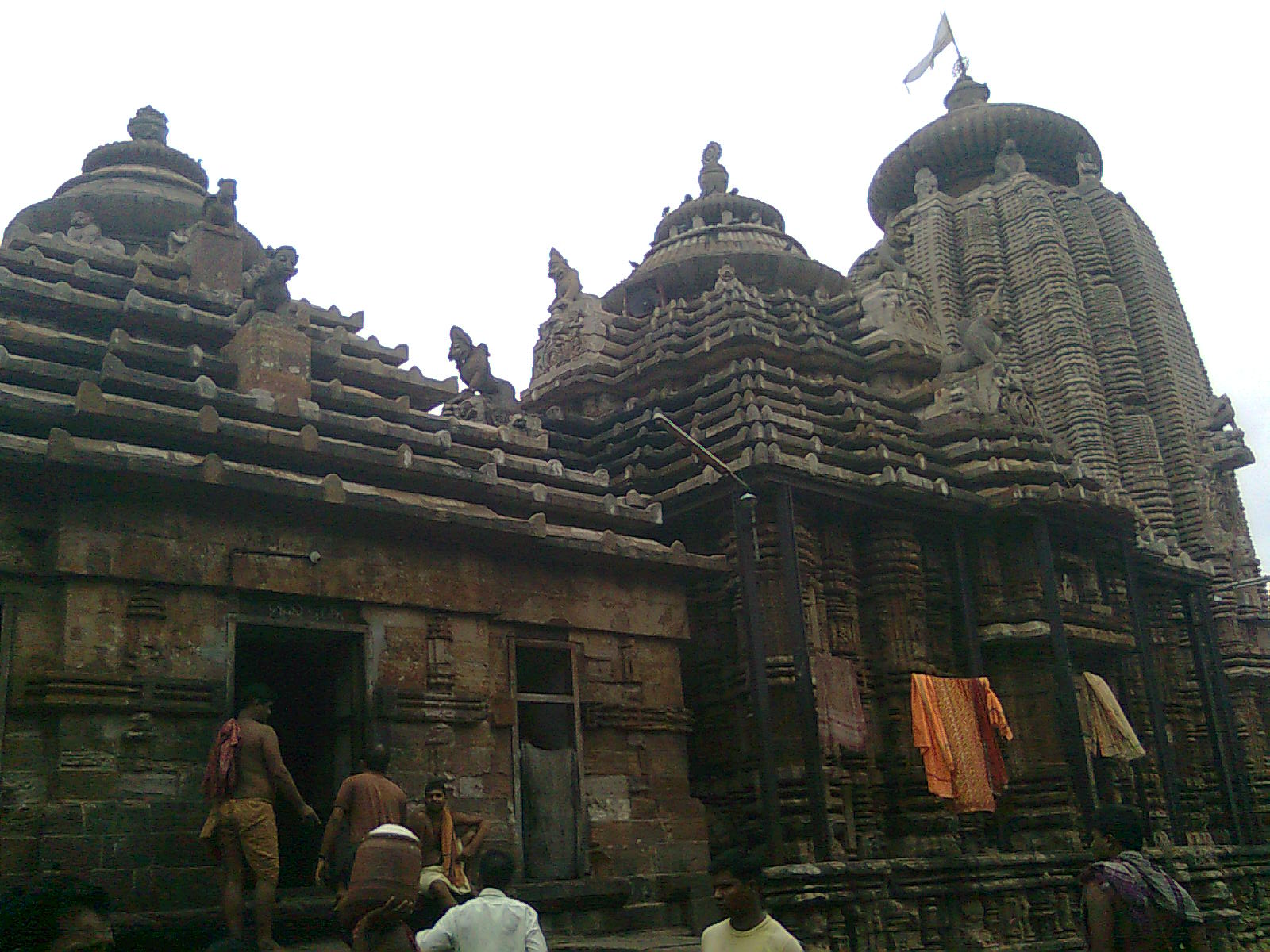
Ananta Vasudeva Temple, Orissa

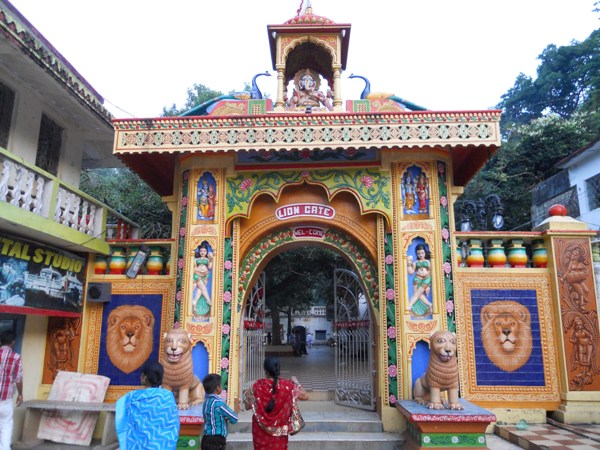
Nrusinghanath Temple, Orissa

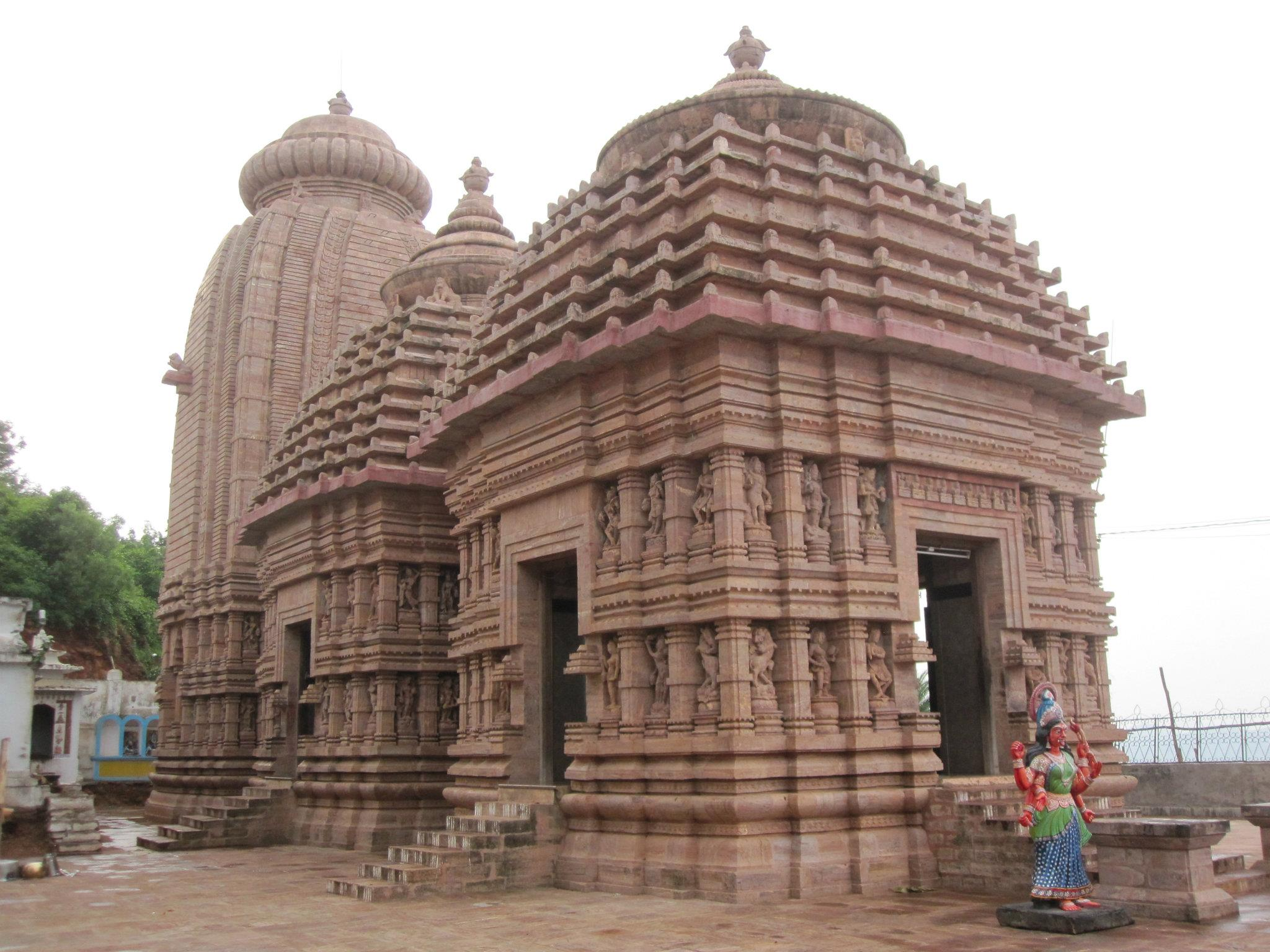
Taratarini Temple, Orissa

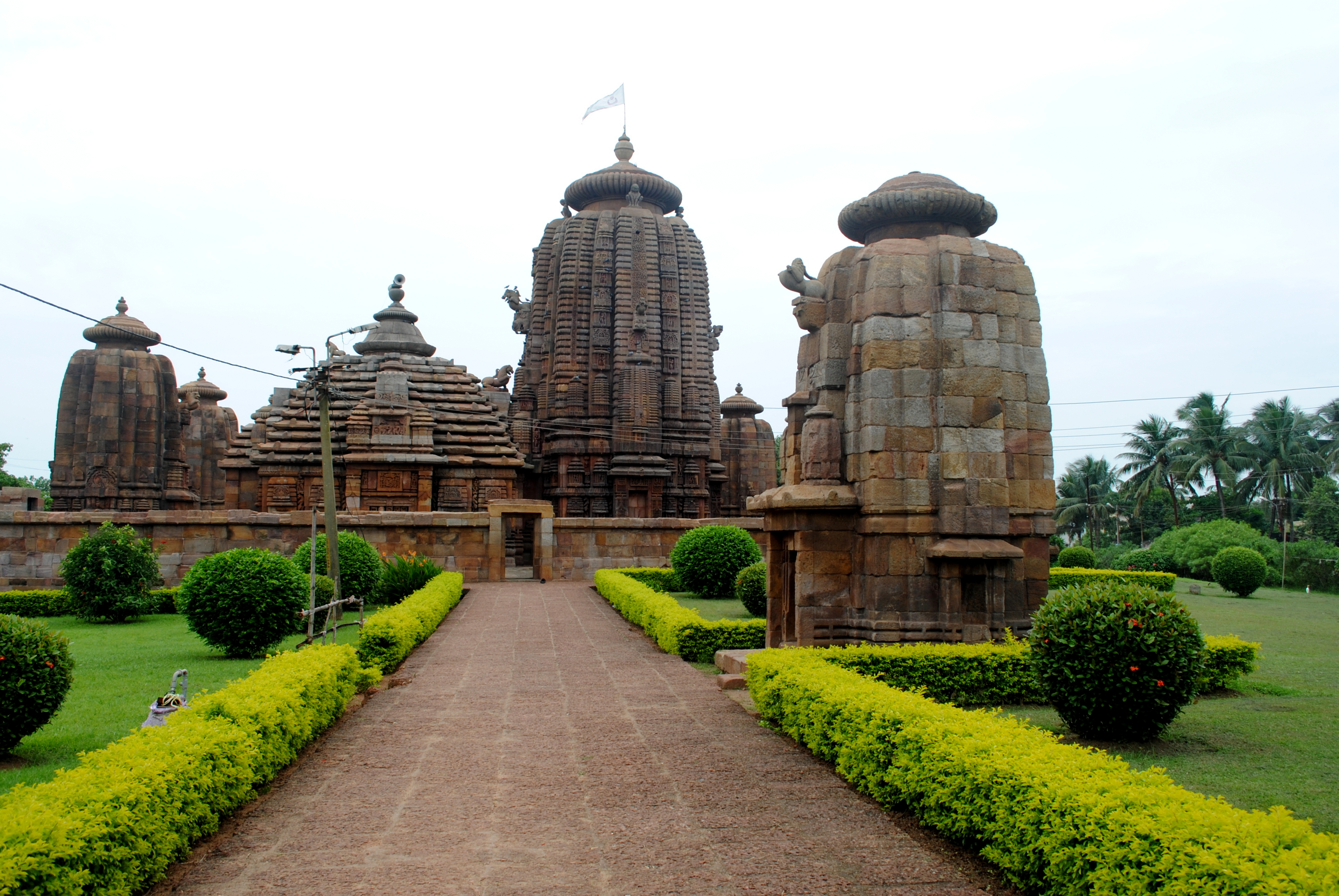
Brahmeswara Temple

- Ajaikapada Bhairava Temple
- Ananta Shayana
- Ananta Vasudeva Temple
- Annakoteshvara Temple
- Astasambhu Siva Temples
- Baitala Deula
- Baladevjew Temple
- Bhagabati Temple, Banapur
- Bharati Matha
- Bhattarika Temple
- Bhringesvara Siva Temple
- Biraja Temple, Jajpur
- Brahma Temple, Bindusagar
- Brahmeswara Temple
- Budha Deula
- Byamokesvara temple
- Chakreshvari Siva Temple
- Chakresvara Tank
- Charchika Temple
- Chateshwar Temple
- Cuttack Chandi Temple
- Dhabaleswar
- Dharakote
- Dishisvara Siva Temple
- Durga Temple, Motia
- Gupteswar Cave
- Harihara Deula, Boudh
- Harishankar Temple
- Jagannath Temple, Baripada, Mayurbhanj
- Jagannath Temple, Koraput, Sabara Srikhetra in Koraput
- Jagannath Temple, Nayagarh, Nayagarh
- Jagannath Temple, Puri
- Jaleswar Siva Temple Precinct
- Kakatpur Mangala Temple
- Kalabhairavi Temple
- Kalikadevi Temple
- Kapilash Temple
- Kapilesvara Siva Temple
- Kedareswar Temple
- Khiching
- Khirachora Gopinatha Temple, Remuna, Balasore
- Kichakeshwari Temple
- Konark Sun Temple, Konark
- Lankeswari Temple, Sonepur
- Lingaraj Temple
- Lokanatha Temple
- Maa Taratarini Temple, Adi Shakti Pith, Ganjam
- Maa Tarini Temple, Ghatgaon, Kendujhar
- Maa Ugra Tara
- Madneswar Siva Temple
- Mahabhoi Sasana Tank
- Mahakala-Mahakali Temple
- Mahavinayak Temple
- Mahendragiri, Orissa
- Mangalesvara Siva Temple
- Manibhadresvara Siva Temple – I
- Manibhadresvara Temple – II
- Manikeshwari Temple
- Manikeshwari Temple, Bhawanipatna, Kalahandi
- Markandeshwar Temple
- Markandeshwar Temple
- Mausimaa Temple
- Mukteshvara Temple, Bhubaneswar
- Nagesvara Temple, Bhubaneswar
- Narayana Gosain Temple
- Narayani Temple
- Nilamadhav Temple
- Nilkantheswar Shiva temple
- Nrusinghanath Temple
- Pabaneswara temple
- Panchalingeshwar
- Papanasini Siva Temple
- Parsurameswar Temple
- Parvati Temple
- Paschimesvara Siva Temple
- Patalesvara Siva Temple – I
- Patalesvara Siva Temple – II
- Patalesvara Siva Temple – III
- Patali Srikhetra, Subarnapur
- Raghunath Temple, Odagaon
- Rajarani Temple
- Ram Mandir, Janpath
- Ramachandi Temple
- Rameshwar Deula
- Sakshigopal Temple
- Samaleswari Temple
- Sanisvara Siva Temple
- Saptamatruka Temple
- Sarala Temple
- Simhanath Temple
- Sivatirtha Matha, Old Town
- Subarnameru Temple
- Subarnesvara Siva Temple
- Suka Temple
- Sukutesvara Temple
- Sundaresvara Siva Temple
- Sureswari temple
- Svapnesvara Siva Temple
- Swarnadhisvara Siva Temple
- Talesavara Siva Temple – II
- Talesvara Siva Temple
- The Leaning Temple of Huma
- Tirthesvara Siva temple
- Upper Bagh Devi Temple
- Uttaresvara Siva Temple
- Varahi Deula, Chaurasi
- Vishnu Temple, Bhubaneswar
- Visvanatha Shiva Temple, Bhubaneswar
- Yajna Nrisimha Temple
- Yameshwar Temple
- Yamesvara Tank (Nala Kunda)

== Punjab ==
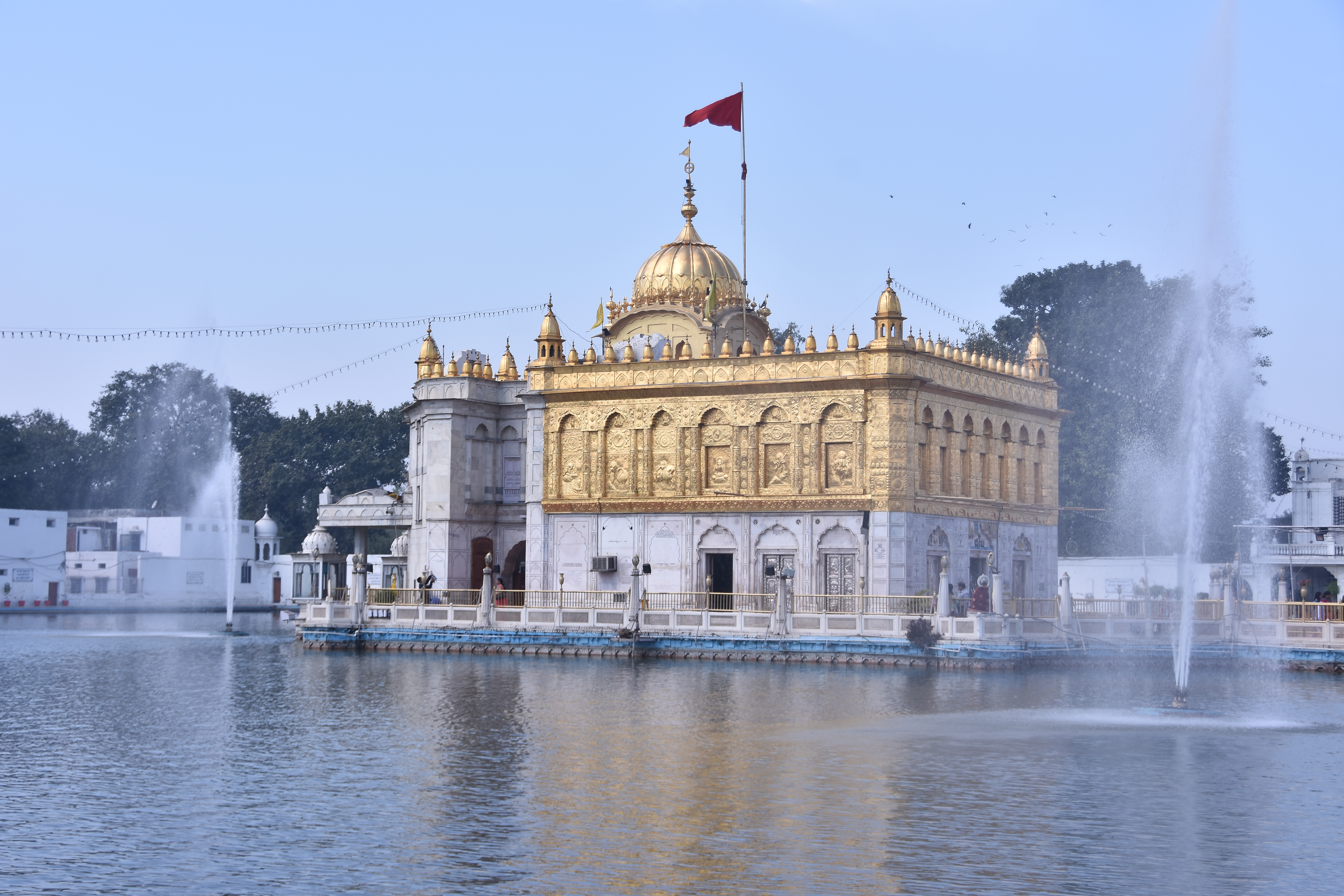
Shri Durgiana Mandir

- Devi Talab Mandir, Jalandhar
- Durgiana Temple, Amritsar
- Jayanti Devi Temple, Mohali
- Julfa Mata Temple, Nangal
- Maiser Khana, Bathinda
- Mukteshwar Mahadev Temple, Pathankot
- Shanaleshwara Swayambhu Temple, Rajpura
- Shri Kali Devi Temple, Patiala
- Suraj Kund Temple, Sunam
- Thakurdwara Bhagwan Narainji, Gurdaspur

== Rajasthan ==
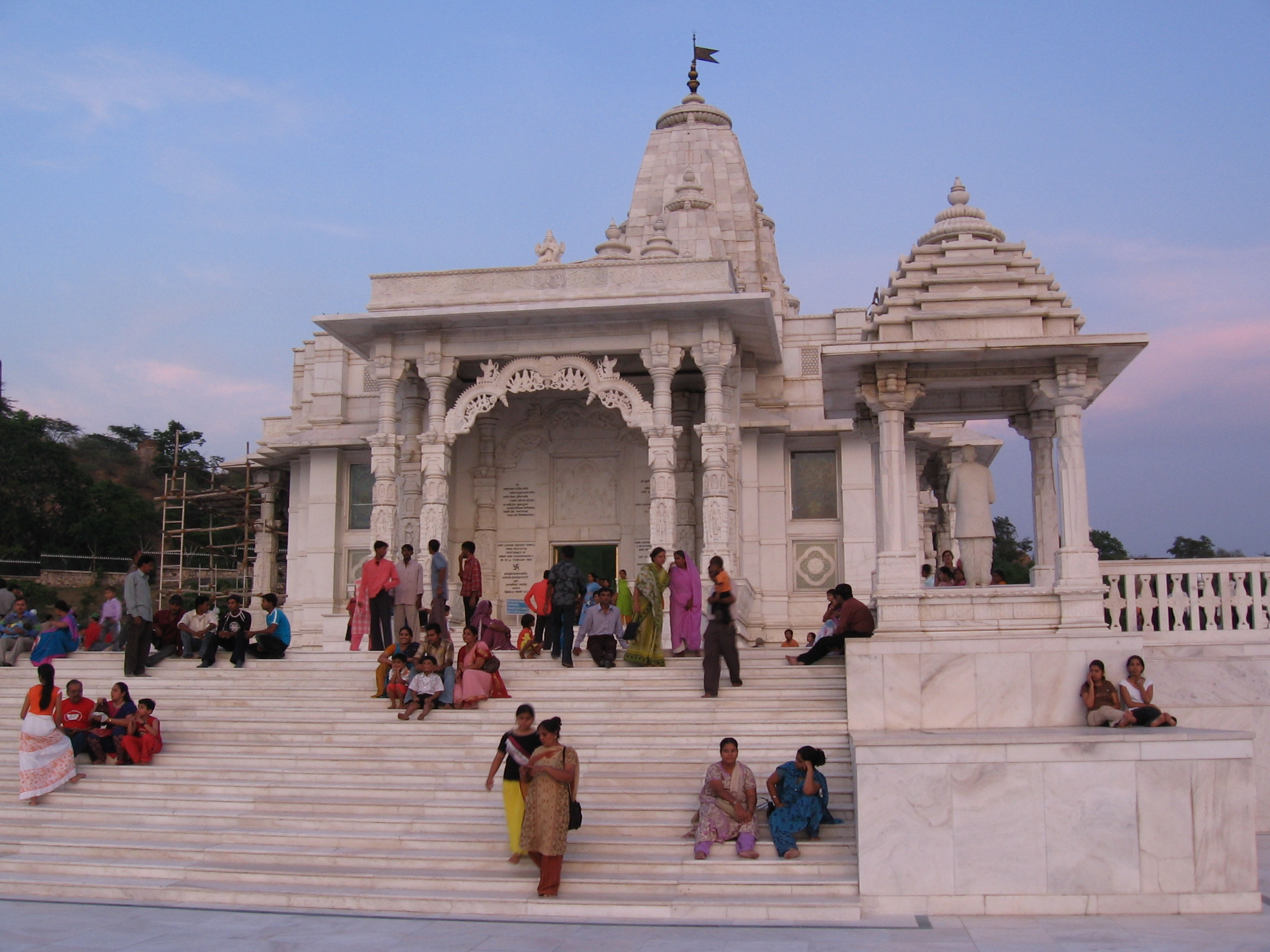
Birla Mandir, Jaipur

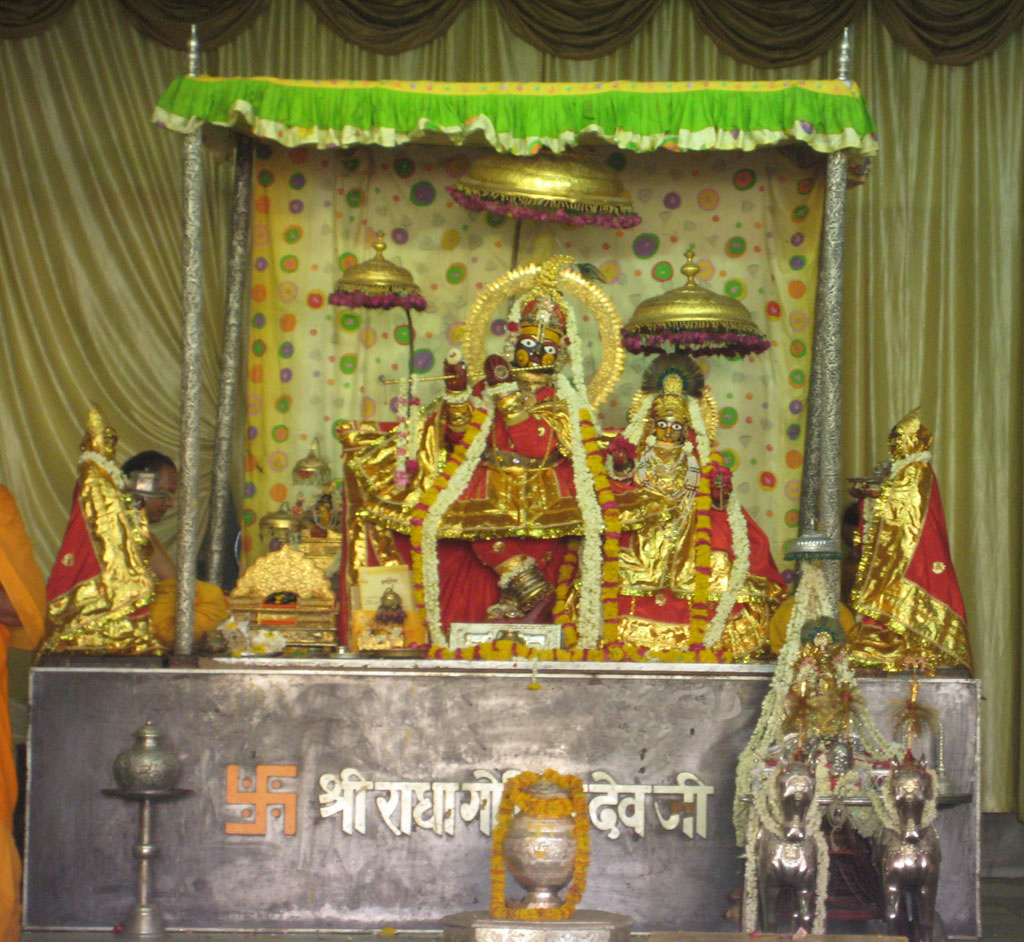
Radha Govind Dev ji Temple, Jaipur

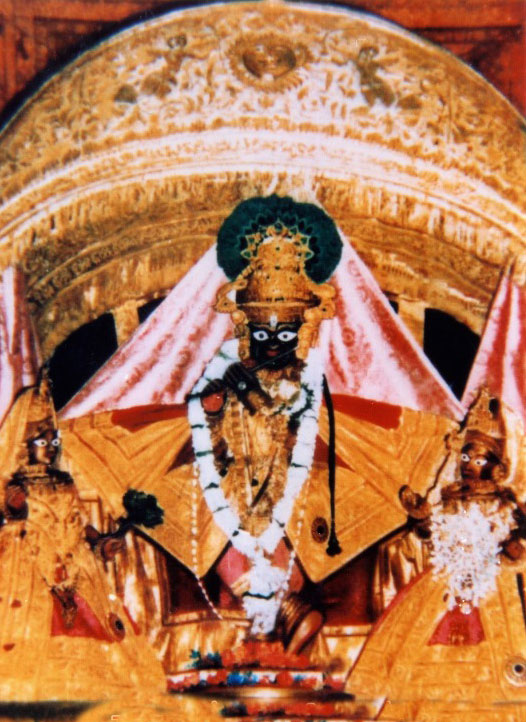
Radha Madan Mohan Temple, Karauli

- Ambika Mata Temple
- Birla Mandir, Jaipur
- Brahma Temple, Pushkar
- Charbhuja, Rajsamand District
- Charbhuja Nath Temple, Bundi, Rajasthan
- Eklingji Mahadev Temple
- Galtaji, Jaipur
- Garh Ganesh Temple, Jaipur
- Govind Deo Ji, Jaipur
- Govind Dev Ji Temple, Jaipur
- Jagdish temple
- Kaila Devi Temple, Kaila devi, Karauli
- Kalika Mata Temple, Chittorgarh Fort
- Kalki Mandir, Jaipur
- Karni Mata Temple, Deshnoke
- Khatu Shyam Temple khatu
- Madan Mohan Temple, Karauli
- Mehandipur Balaji Temple, Todabhim
- Moti Dungari Temple, Jaipur
- Neemach Mata Temple
- Radha Gopinath Ji, Jaipur
- Rani Sati Temple, Jhunjhunu
- Salasar Balaji Temple, Salasar
- Sitaleshwar Temple
- Sundha Mata Temple
- Tanot Mata Temple
- Tarkeshwar Nath Temple, Jaipur

== Sikkim ==
- Hanuman Tok, Gangtok
- Kirateshwar Mahadev Temple, Legship
- Thakurbari Temple, Gangtok

== Tamil Nadu ==
There are more than 33,000 ancient temples in Tamil Nadu.

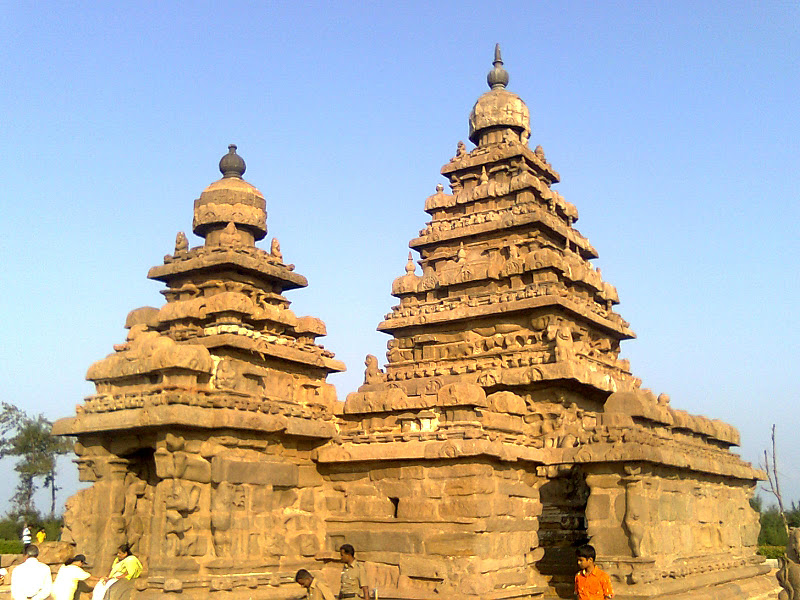
Shore Temple

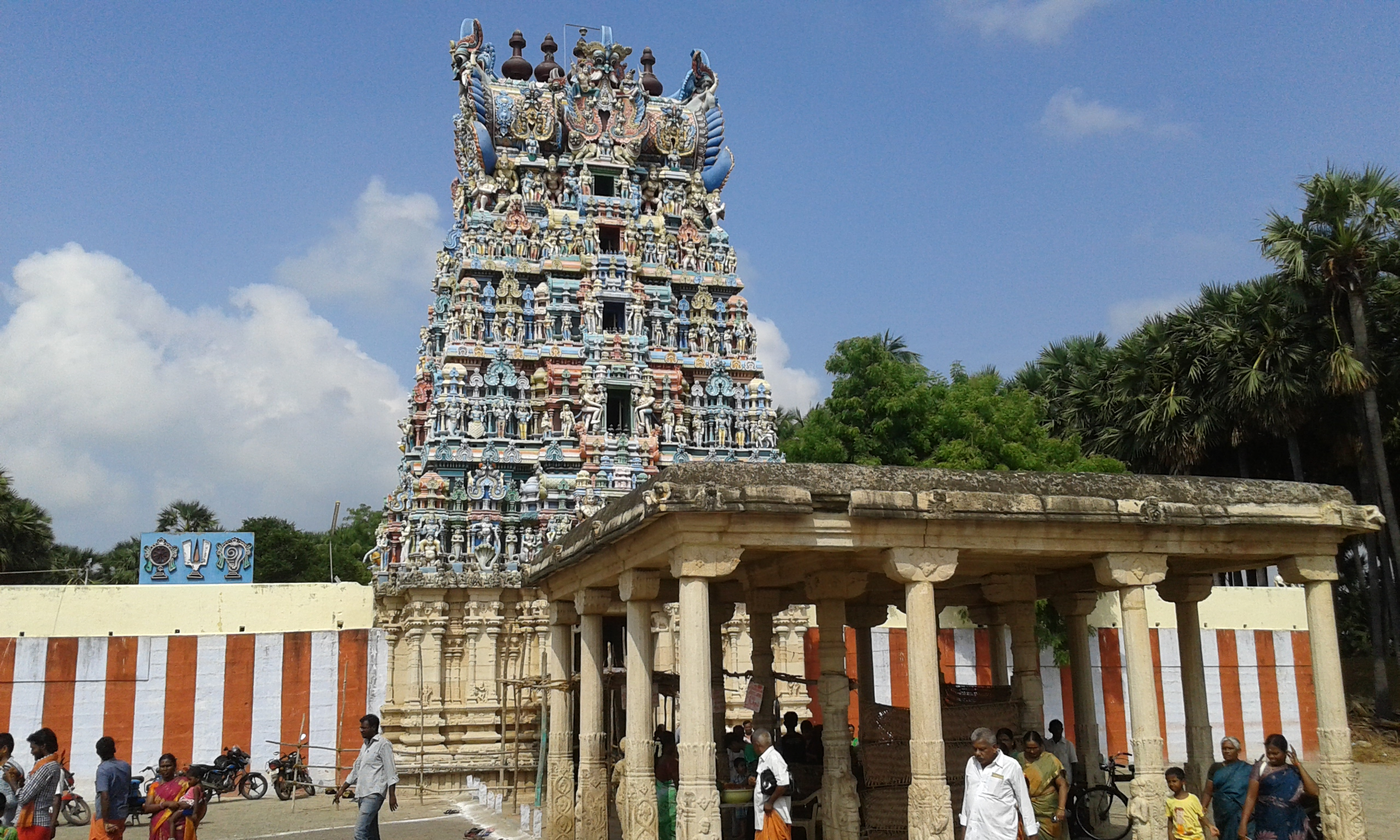
Thiruvaragunamangai Perumal Temple

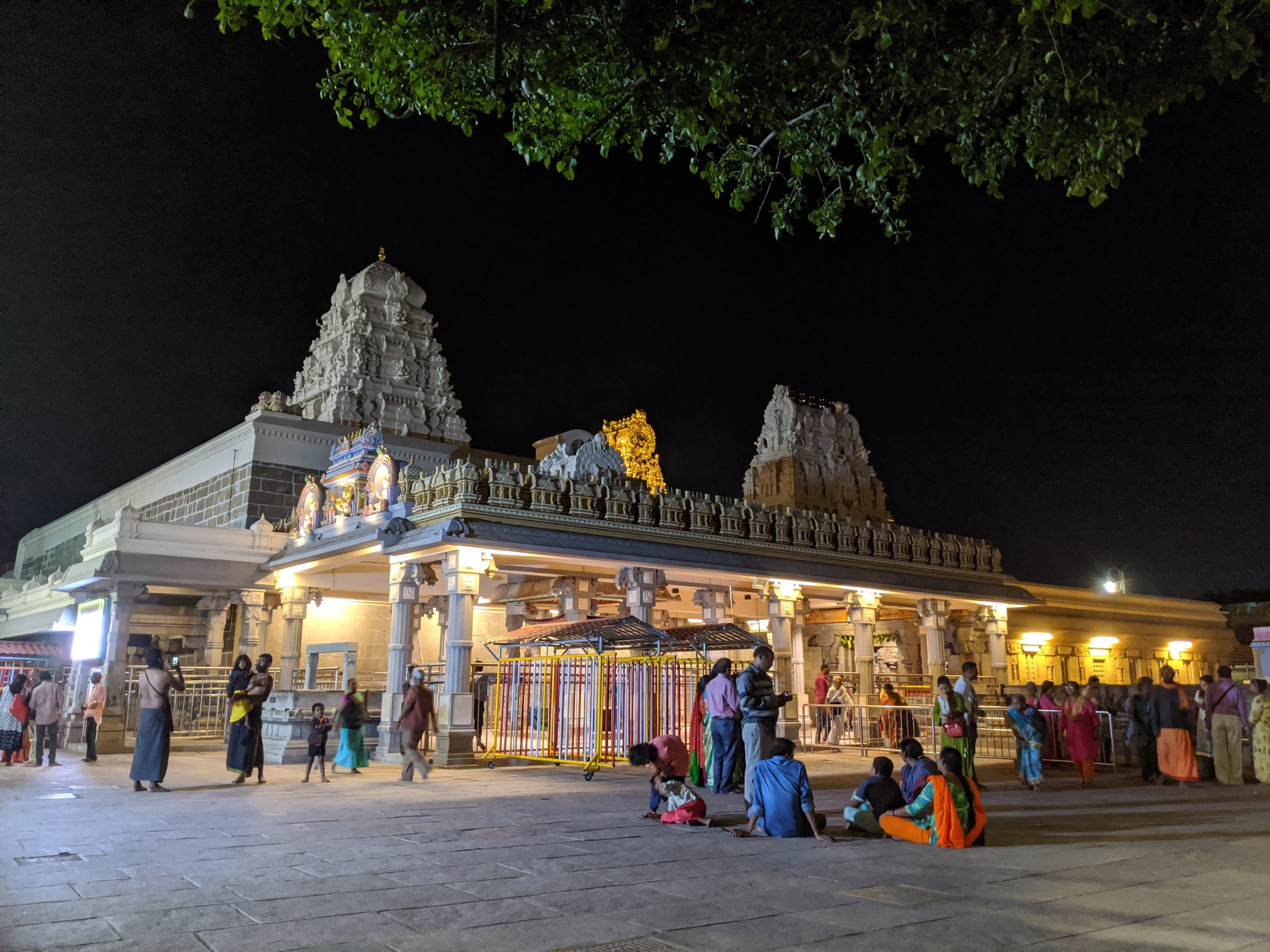
Kamakshi Amman Temple

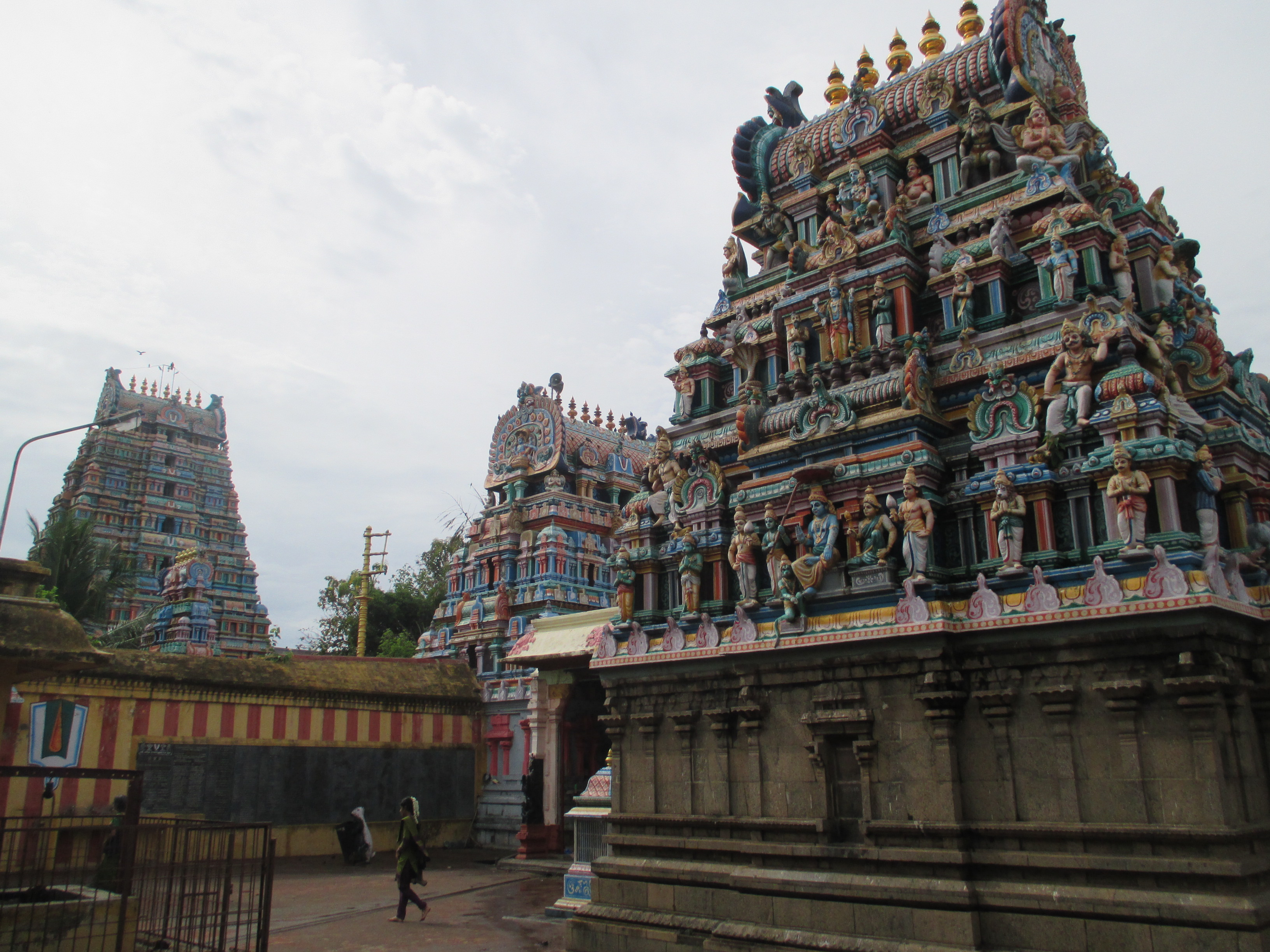
Soundararajaperumal temple, Nagapattinam

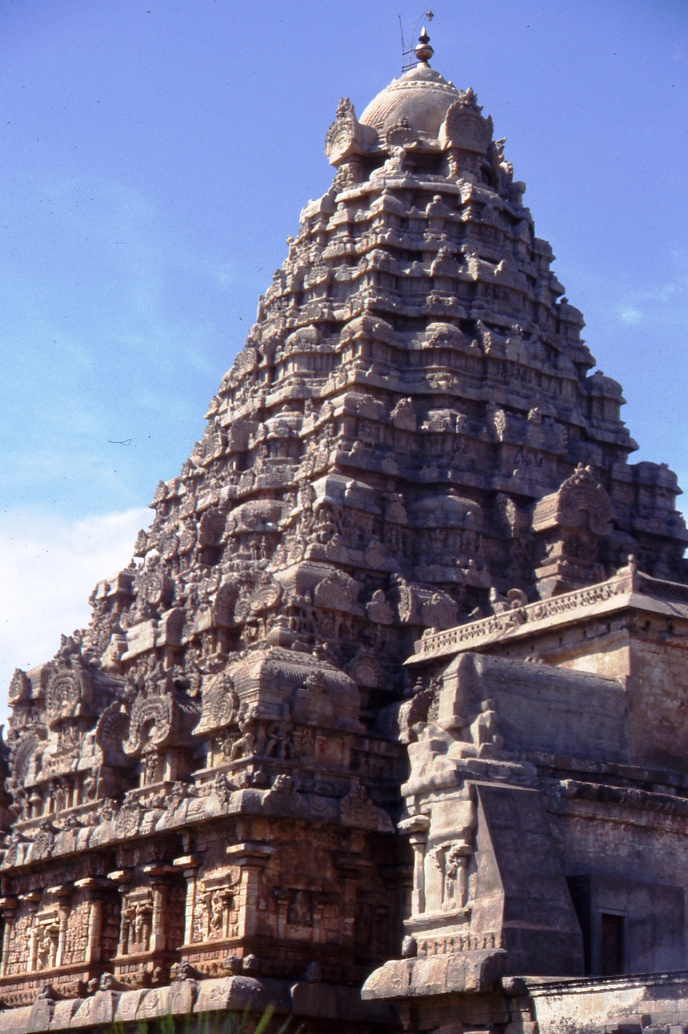
Gangaikonda Cholapuram

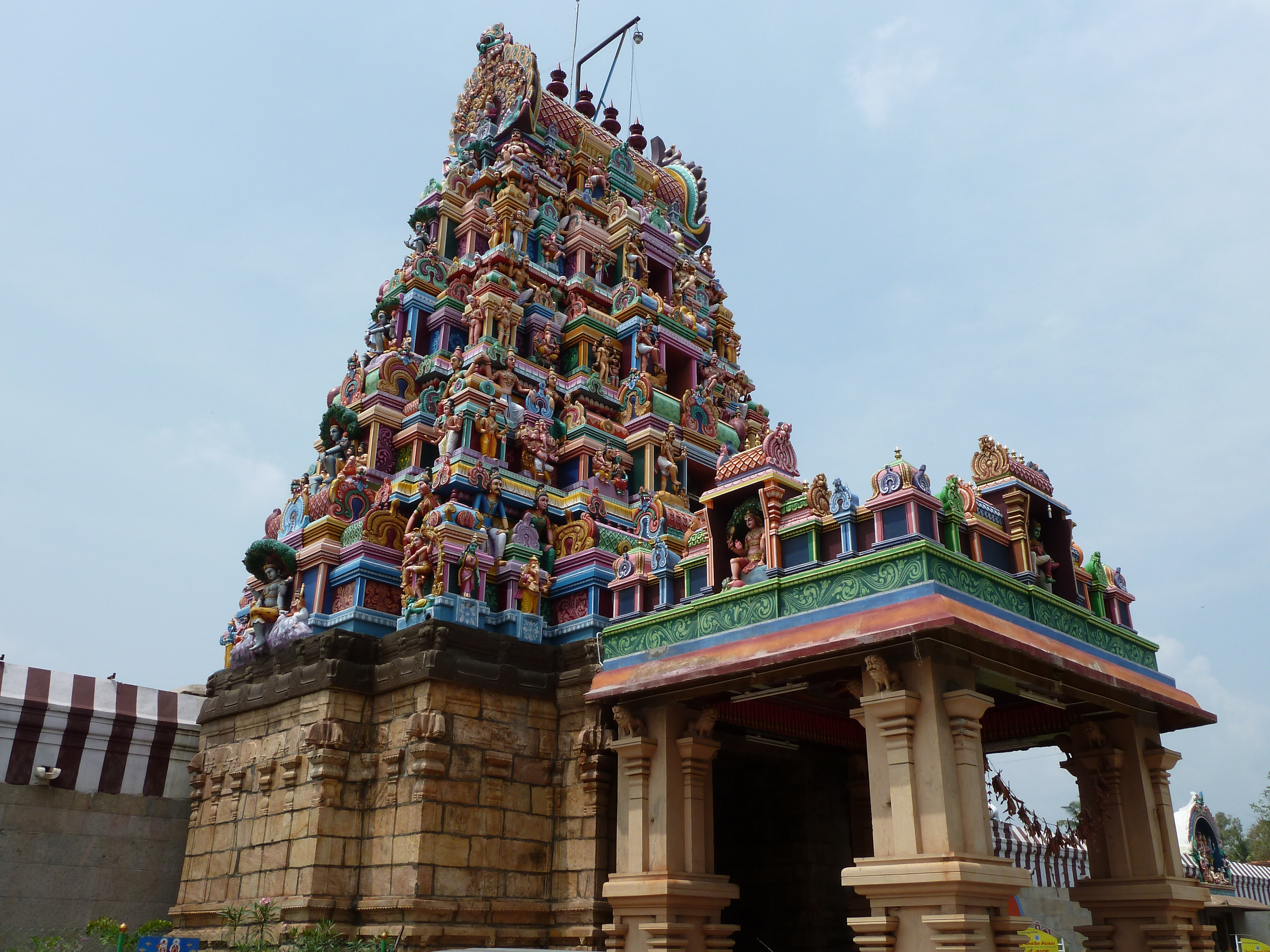
Perur Pateeswarar Temple

- Adhirangam Ranganathaswamy temple
- Adi Jagannatha Perumal Temple
- Adi Srinivasa perumal temple
- Adikesava Perumal Temple, Kanyakumari
- Adikesava Perumal temple, Mylapore
- Adikesava Perumal temple, Sriperumpudur
- Airavatesvara Temple
- Amritaghateswarar-Abirami Temple, Mayiladuthurai
- Anjaneya Temple, Nanganallur
- Annamalaiyar Temple
- Ardhanareeswarar temple, Tiruchengode, Namakkal
- Arulmigu Manneaswarar Temple, Annur
- Arulmigu Munthi Vinayagar Temple
- Arulmigu Prasanna Venkatesa Perumal Temple
- Bannari Amman Temple
- Bhaktha Anjaneyar
- Bhu Varaha Swamy temple
- Brahmapureeswarar Temple
- Brihadeeswarar Temple at Thanjavur
- Ekambaranathar Temple
- Eri-Katha Ramar Temple
- Gangaikonda Cholapuram Temple
- Gingee Venkataramana Temple
- Gomathi Amman
- Iskcon Temple, Chennai
- Jagannatha Perumal temple
- Jakath Rakshaka Perumal temple, Thirukkoodaloor
- Jalakandeswarar Temple, Vellore
- Jambukeswarar Temple, Thiruvanaikaval
- Kaliyuga Varadaraja Perumal Temple
- Kapaleeshwarar Temple
- Karpaka Vinayakar Temple
- Kazheesirama Vinnagaram
- Koniamman Temple, Coimbatore
- Koodal Azhagar temple
- Manakula Vinayagar Temple
- Marudhamalai Subramanya Swami Temple, Coimbatore
- Mayuranathaswami Temple, Mayiladuthurai
- Meenakshi Amman Temple
- Mondaicaud Bhagavathi Temple
- Mudikondan Kothandaramar Temple
- Nagaraja Temple, Nagercoil
- Nageswaraswamy Temple, Kumbakonam
- Namakkal Anjaneyar Temple
- Narasimhaswamy Temple, Namakkal
- Natadreeswarar Temple
- Nellaiappar Temple, Tirunelveli
- Oppliyappan Temple
- Pachaimalai Subramanya Swamy Temple
- Padalathri Narasimhar Temple
- Palani Murugan Temple
- Parthasarathy Temple, Chennai
- Pazhamudhircholai Temple
- Perur Pateeswarar Temple, Coimbatore
- Pundarikakshan Perumal Temple
- Punnainallur Kothandaramar Temple
- PunnaiNallur Mariamman temple
- Rajagopalaswamy Temple, Mannargudi
- Ramanathaswamy Temple
- Ranganathaswamy Temple, Srirangam
- Samayapuram Mariamman Temple, Samayapuram
- Sampathgiri Lakshmi Narasimhaswamy Temple
- Sangameswarar Temple
- Sankaranaraya swamy temple
- Sathyamurthi Perumal Temple
- Shore Temple
- Sikkal Singaravelan Temple
- Sri Navaladi Karuppannaswami Temple – Mohanur
- Srivilliputhur Andal Temple
- Sundararaja Perumal temple
- Swamimalai Murugan Temple
- Thalai Sanga Nanmathiyam Perumal Temple
- Thanjai Mamani Koil
- Thanumalayan Temple
- Thillai Nataraja Temple
- Thindal Murugan Temple
- Thiruchendur Murugan Temple
- Thiruthani Murugan Temple
- Thyagaraja Temple, Tiruvarur
- Tirunallar Dharbaranyeswarar Temple
- Tirupparankunram Murugan Temple
- Tiruppukkozhiyur
- Ucchi Pillayar Temple
- Ulagalantha Perumal Temple, Kanchipuram
- Ulagalantha Perumal Temple, Tirukoyilur
- Vaishnava Nambi and Thirukurungudivalli Nachiar temple
- Vaitheeswaran Koil, Mayiladuthurai
- Vana Vishesha Sthalangal
- Vandiyur Mariamman Temple
- Vedanarayana perumal temple, Thirunarayanapuram
- Vedapureeswarar Temple, Puducherry
- Veeraraghava Swamy Temple, Tiruvallur
- Yathothkari Perumal Temple

== Telangana ==
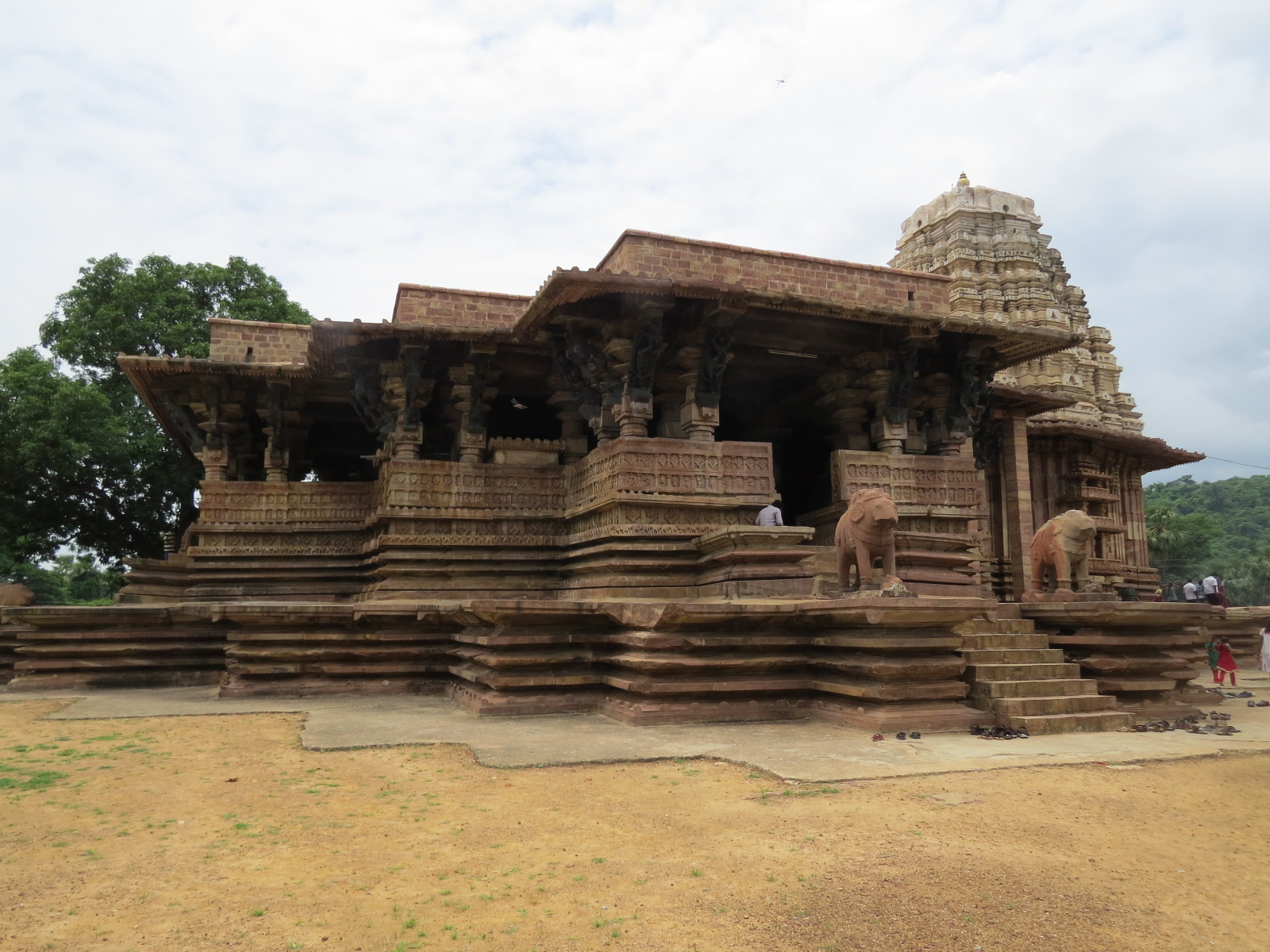
Ramappa Temple

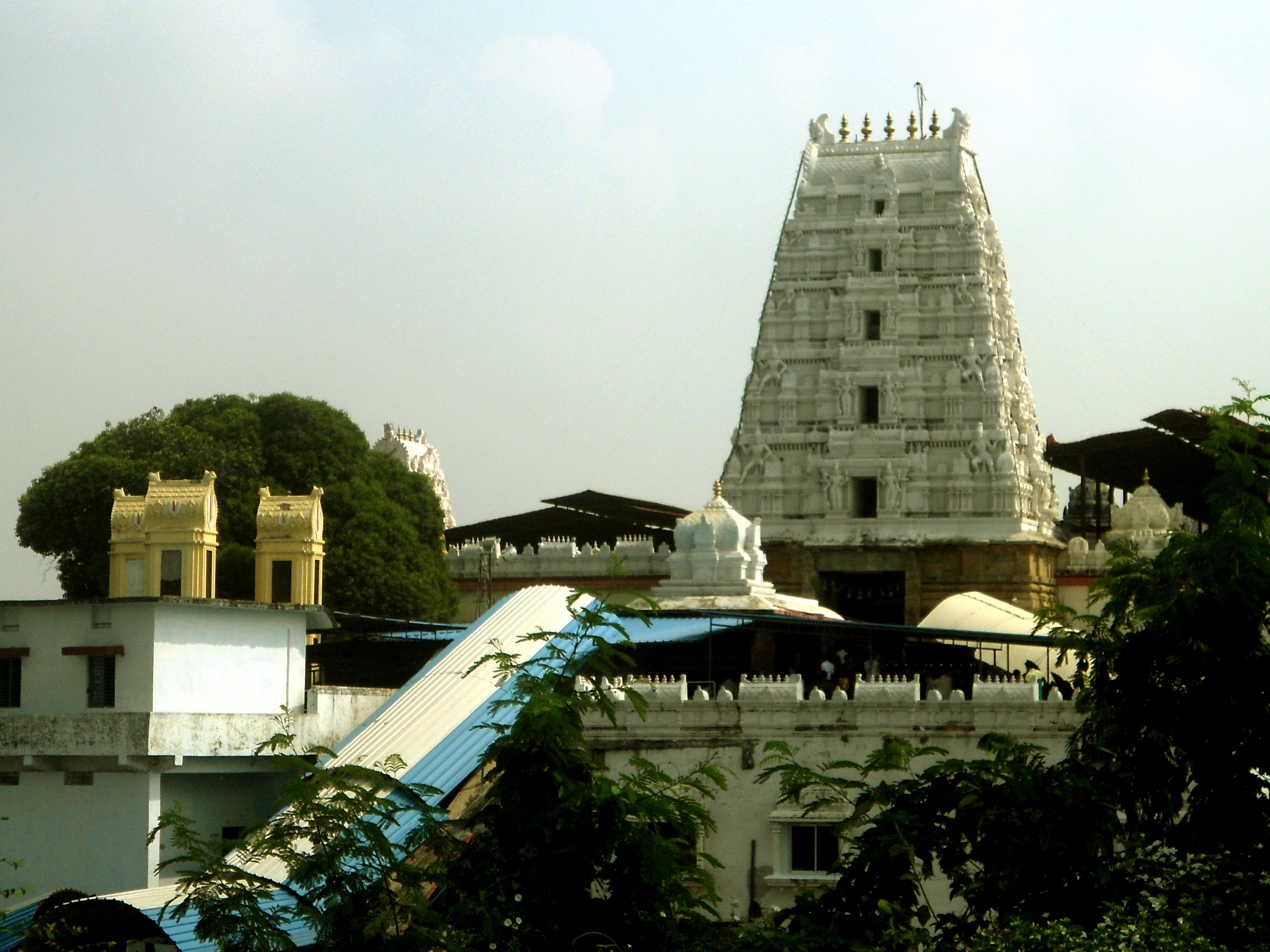
Bhadrachalam Temple

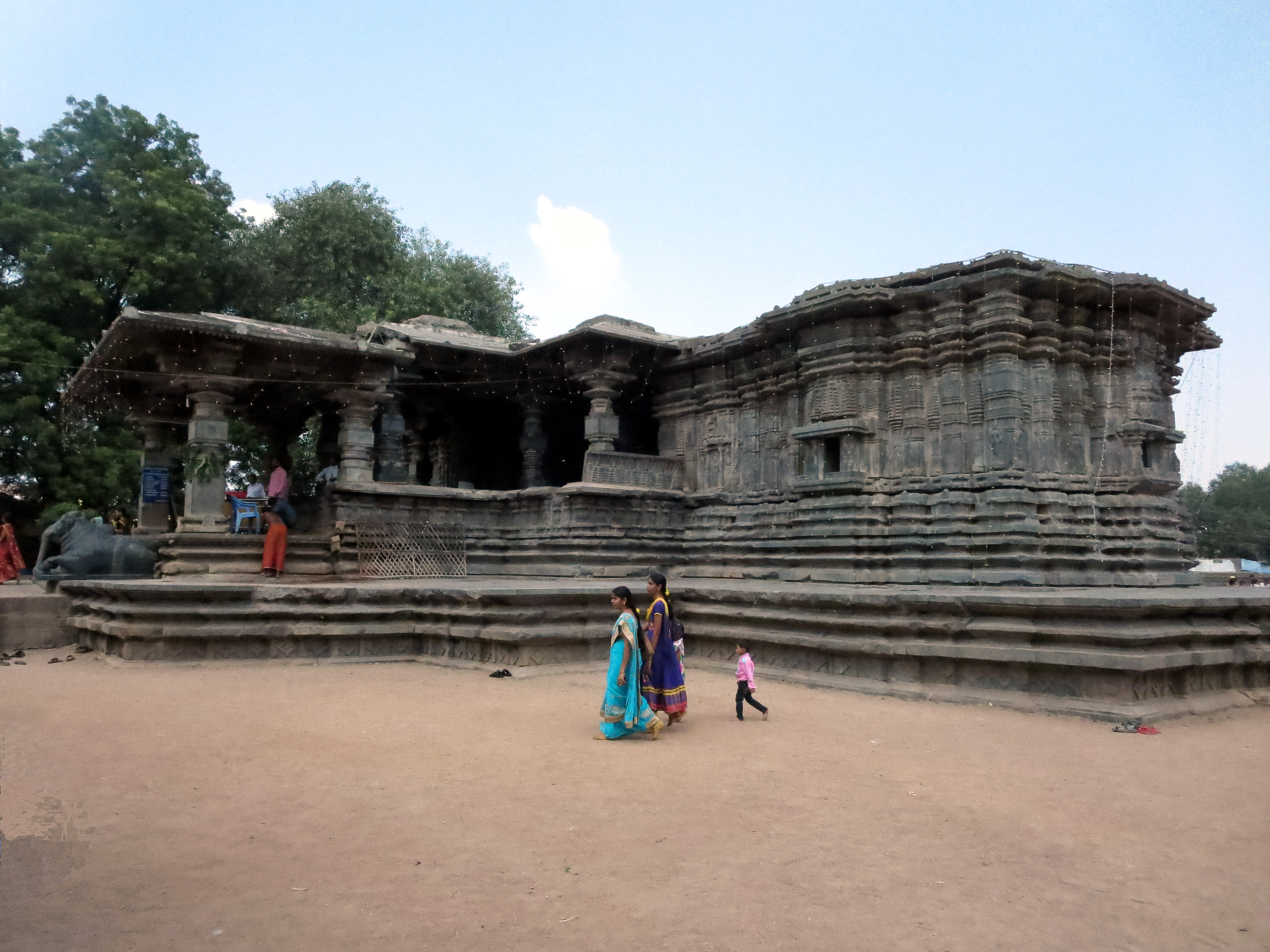
1000 pillar temple in Warangal

- Alampur Jogulamba Temple
- Alampur Navabrahma Temples
- Ananthagiri Temple
- Ashtalakshmi Temple
- Bhadrakali Temple
- Birla Mandir, Hyderabad
- Chaya Someswara Temple
- Chilkoor Balaji Temple
- Dichpally Ramalayam
- Erakeswara Temple, Pillalamarri
- Gnana Saraswati Temple, Basar
- Hare Krishna Golden Temple, Hyderabad
- Hyderabad Kalibari
- Jagannath Temple, Hyderabad
- Jamalapuram Temple
- Kaleshwara Mukteswara Swamy Temple
- Karmanghat Hanuman Temple
- Keesaragutta Temple
- Komuravelli Mallikharjuna Temple
- Kondagattu Anjaneya Swamy Temple
- Kothakonda Jatara
- Kuchadri Venkateshwara Swamy Temple
- Kolanupaka Jain Temple
- Lakshmi Narasimha Temple, Dharmapuri
- Padmakshi Temple
- Raja Rajeswara Temple, Vemulawada
- Ramappa Temple
- Ranganathaswamy Temple, Jiyaguda
- Sammakka Saralamma Jatara
- Sanghi Temple
- Saraswati Temple, Wargal
- Sita Ramachandraswamy Temple, Bhadrachalam
- Sitaram Bagh temple
- Sri Lakshmi Narasimha Swamy Temple, Yadadri
- Sri Peddamma Thalli Temple
- Surendrapuri
- Thousand Pillar Temple
- Ujjaini Mahakali Temple

== Tripura ==
- Agartala Jagannath Mandir
- Chaturdasha Temple
- Lakshmi Narayan Temple, Agartala
- Tripura Sundari Temple
- Unakoti

== Uttar Pradesh ==
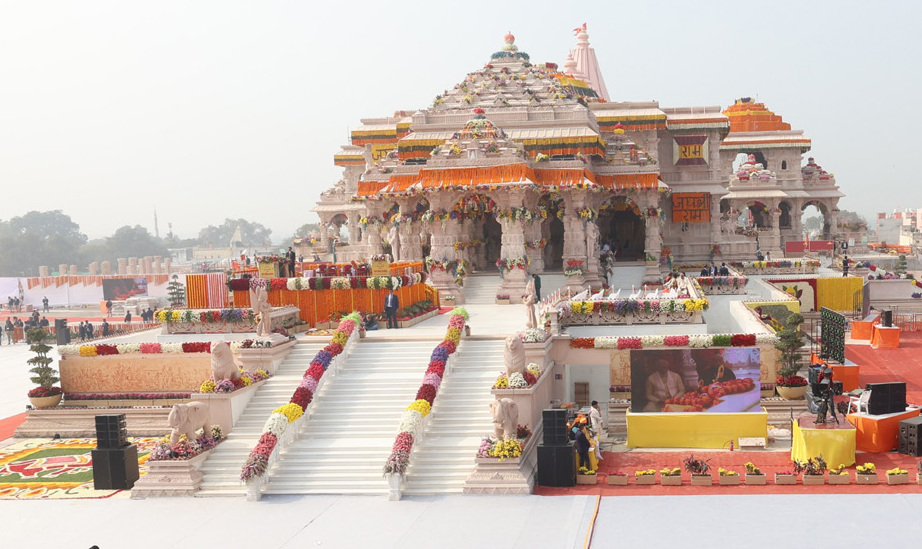
Ram Mandir, Ayodhya

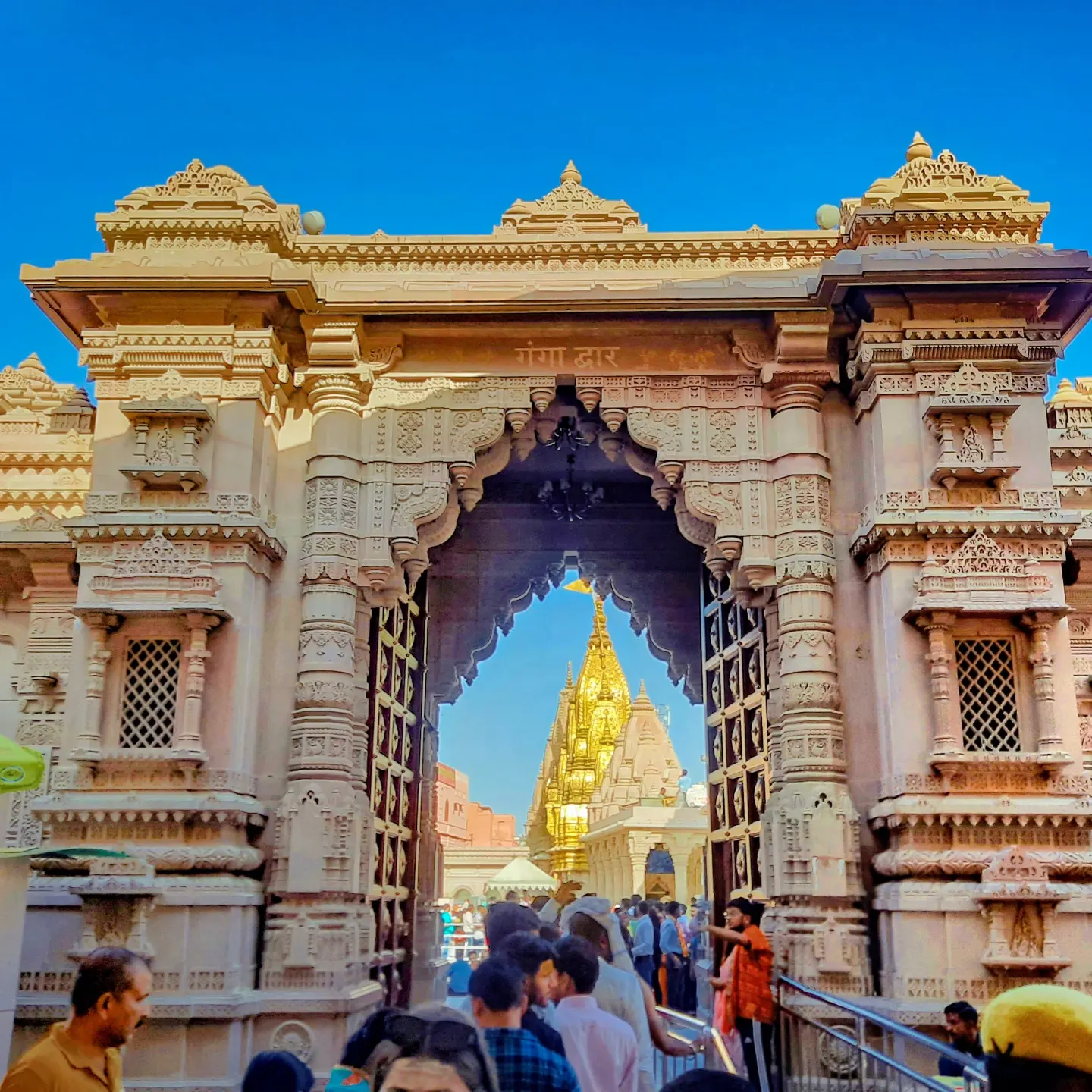
Kashi Vishwanath Temple, Varanasi (Ganga Dwar)

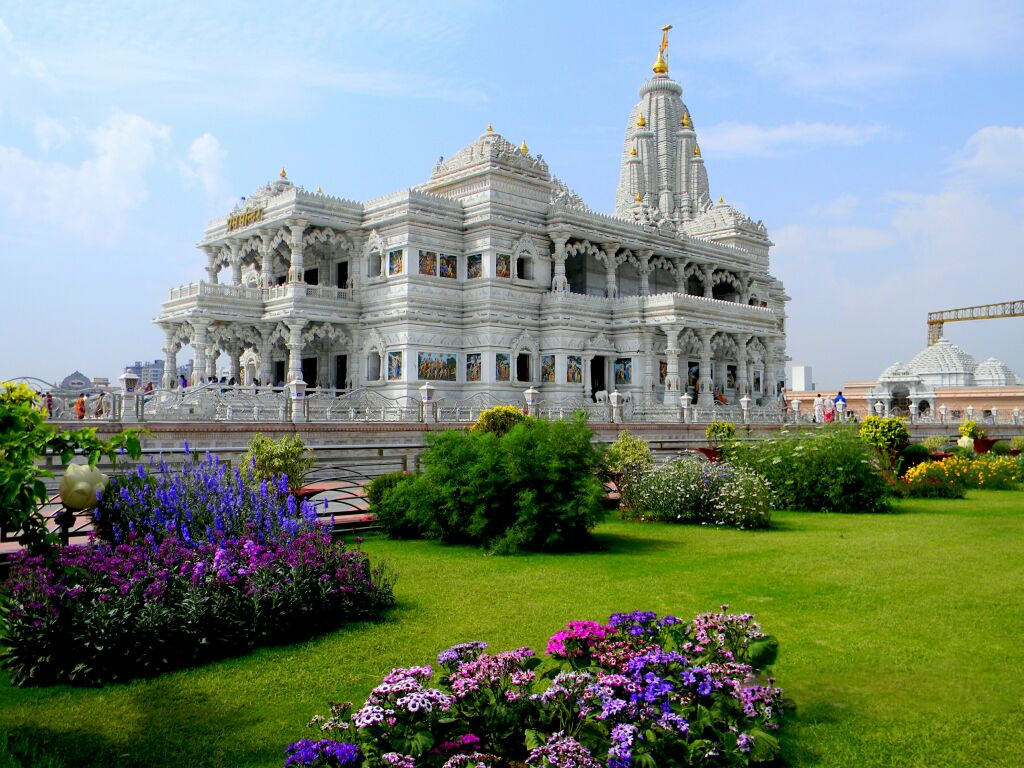
Prem Mandir Vrindavan

- Alopi Devi Mandir, Prayagraj
- Bankey Bihari Temple, Vrindavan
- Bharat Mata Mandir, Mahatma Gandhi Kashi Vidyapith Campus, Varanasi
- Chandrika Devi Temple, Lucknow
- Dwarkadheesh temple, Mathura
- Gorakhnath Math, Gorakhpur
- Govardhan Shila
- Hajari Mahadev Temple, Etawah
- Hanuman Garhi Temple
- JK Temple, Kanpur
- Kashi Vishwanath Temple, Varanasi
- Krishna Balrama Mandir
- Krishna Janmasthan Temple Complex, Mathura
- Kusum Sarovar
- Lodheshwar Mahadev Mandir, Barabanki
- Mankameshwar Temple, Agra
- Nidhivan, Vrindavan
- Prem Mandir, Vrindavan
- Radha Damodar Temple, Vrindavan
- Radha Krishna Vivah Sthali, Bhandirvan
- Radha Kund
- Radha Madan Mohan Temple, Vrindavan
- Radha Raman Temple
- Radha Rani Temple, Barsana
- Radha Vallabh Temple, Vrindavan
- Ram Mandir, Ayodhya
- Sankat Mochan Hanuman Temple, Varanasi
- Swaminarayan Temple, Chhapaiya, Basti
- Ved Mata Gaytri Mandir
- Vindhyachal Temple, Mirzapur
- Waneshwar Mahadev Temple

== Uttarakhand ==
Chota Char Dham

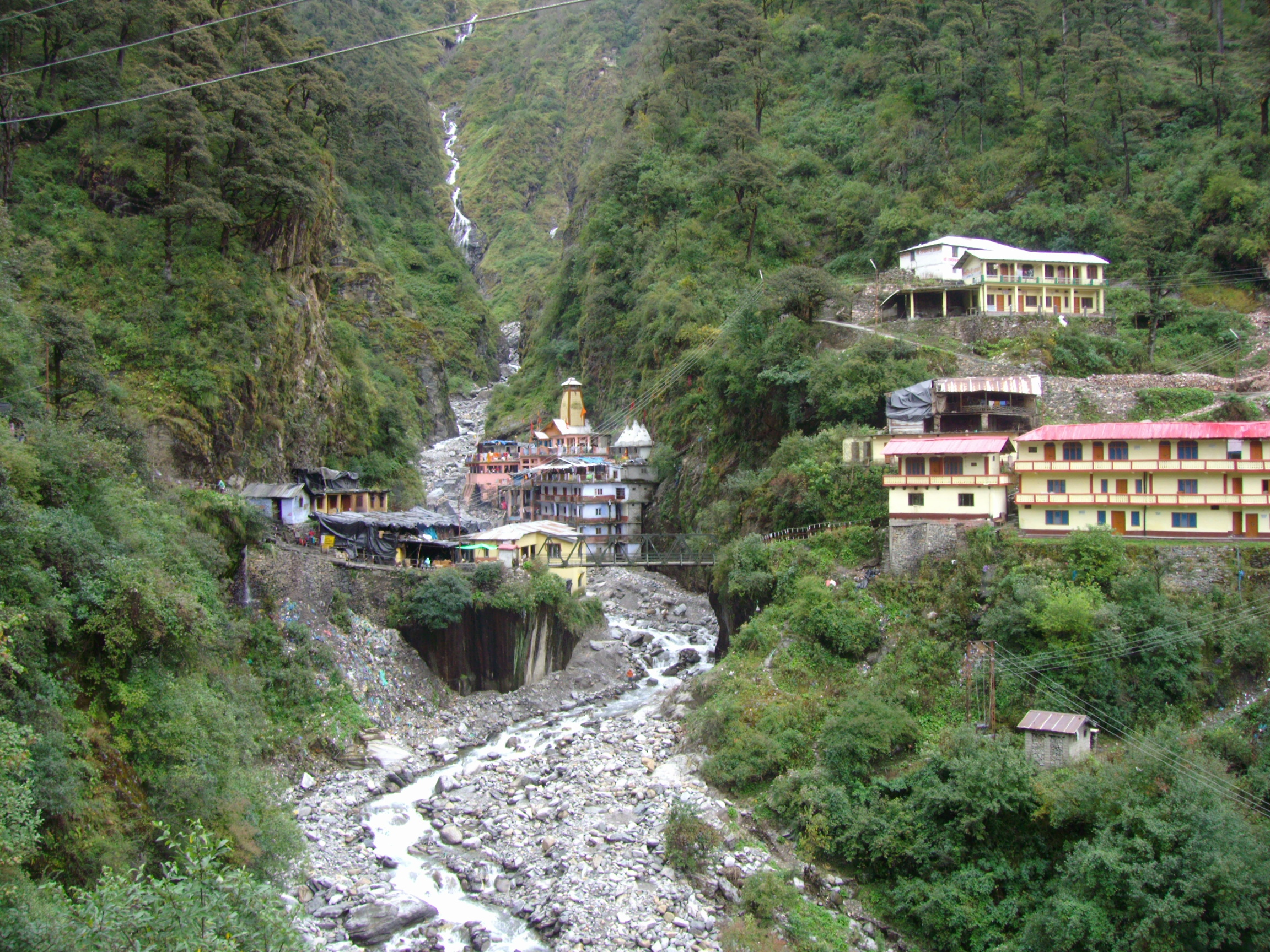
Yamunotri

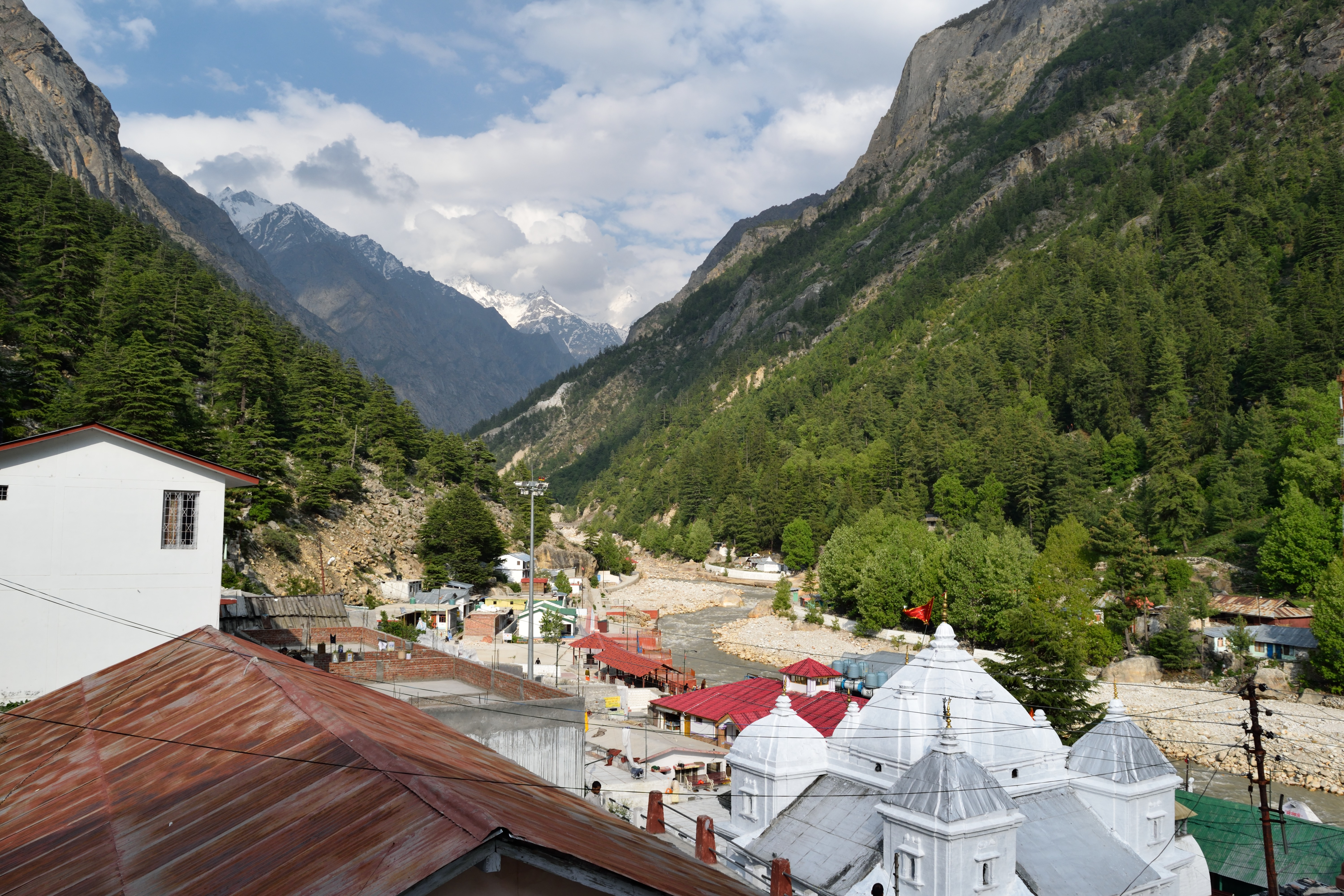
Gangotri

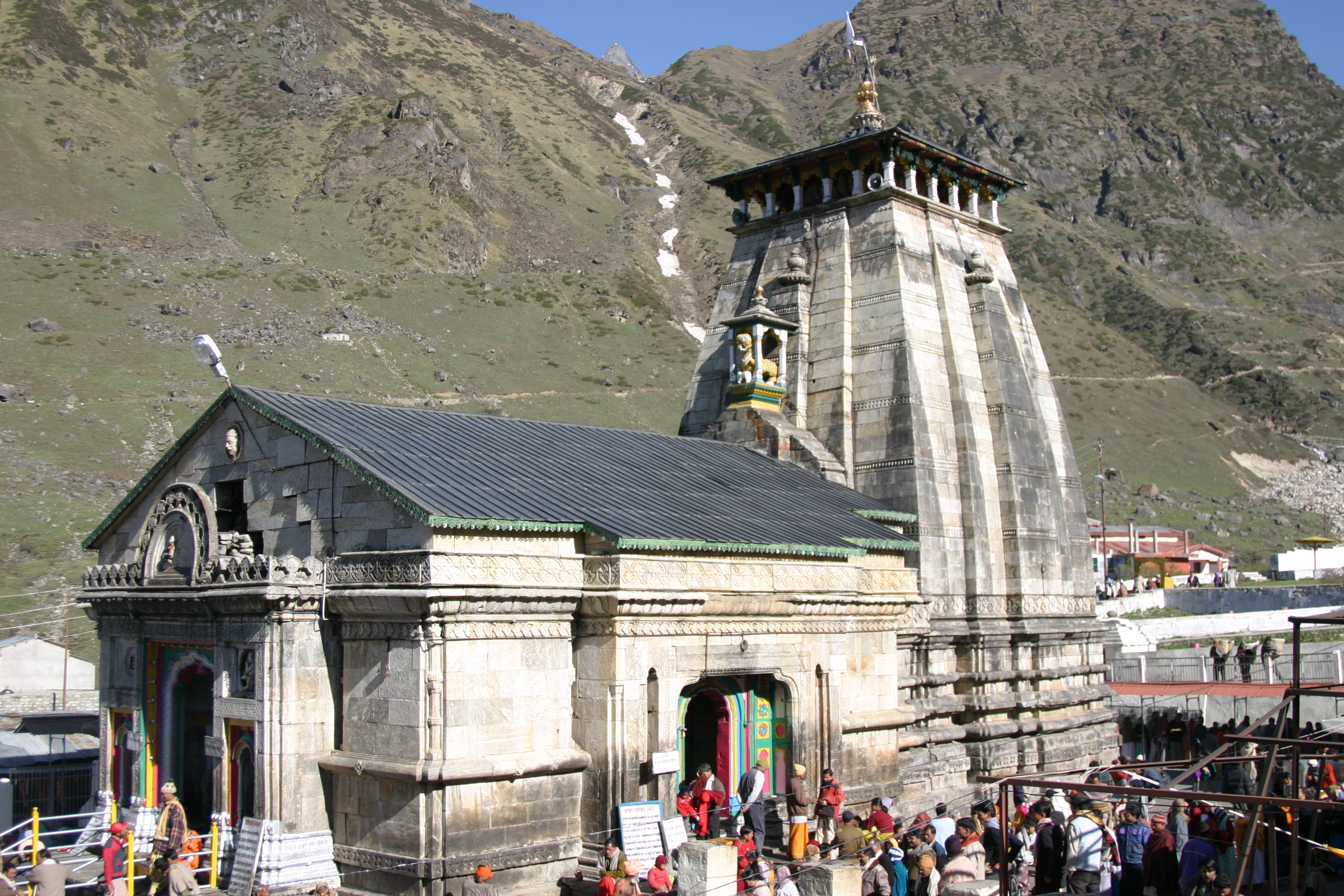
Kedarnath

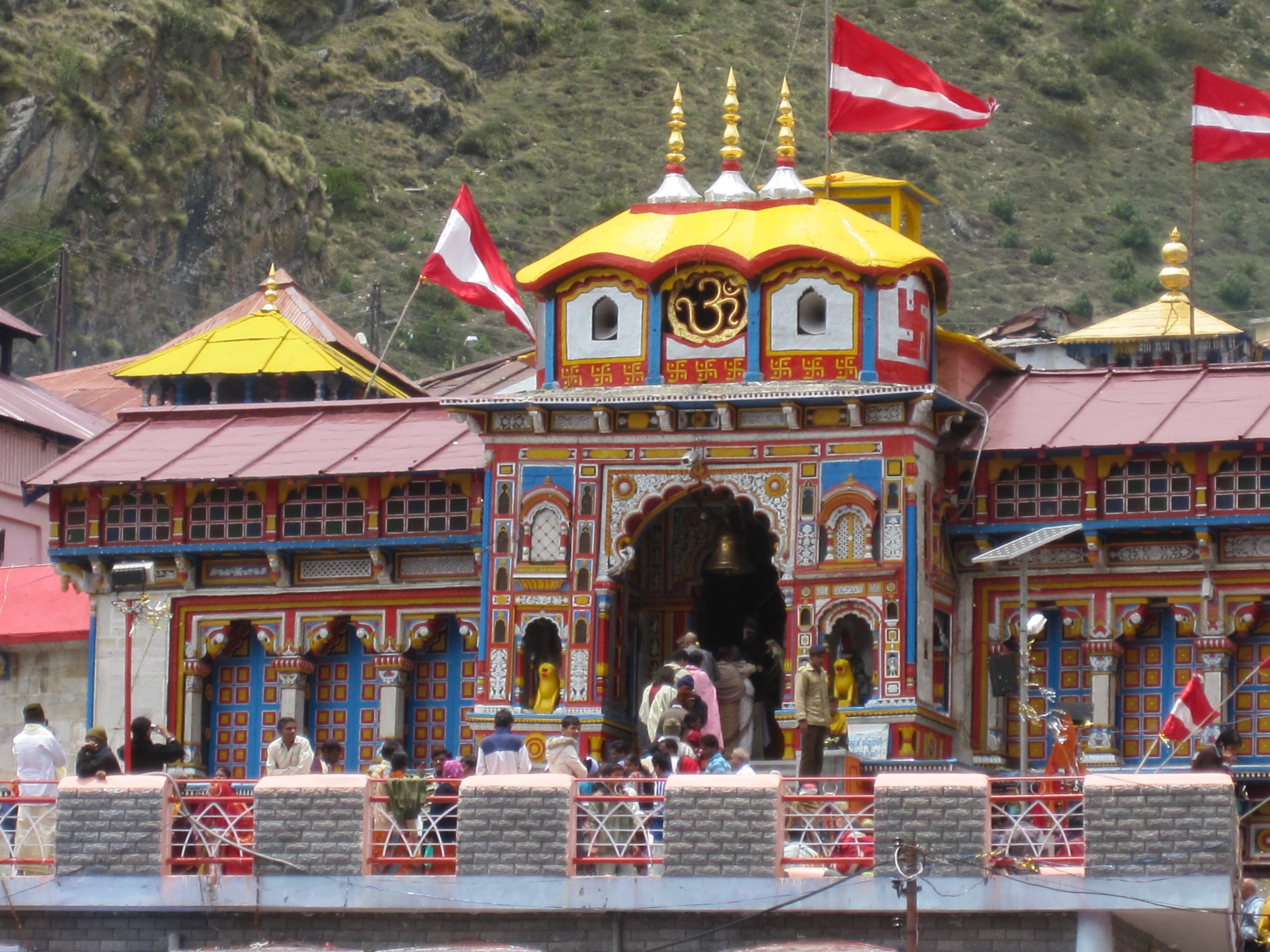
Badrinath

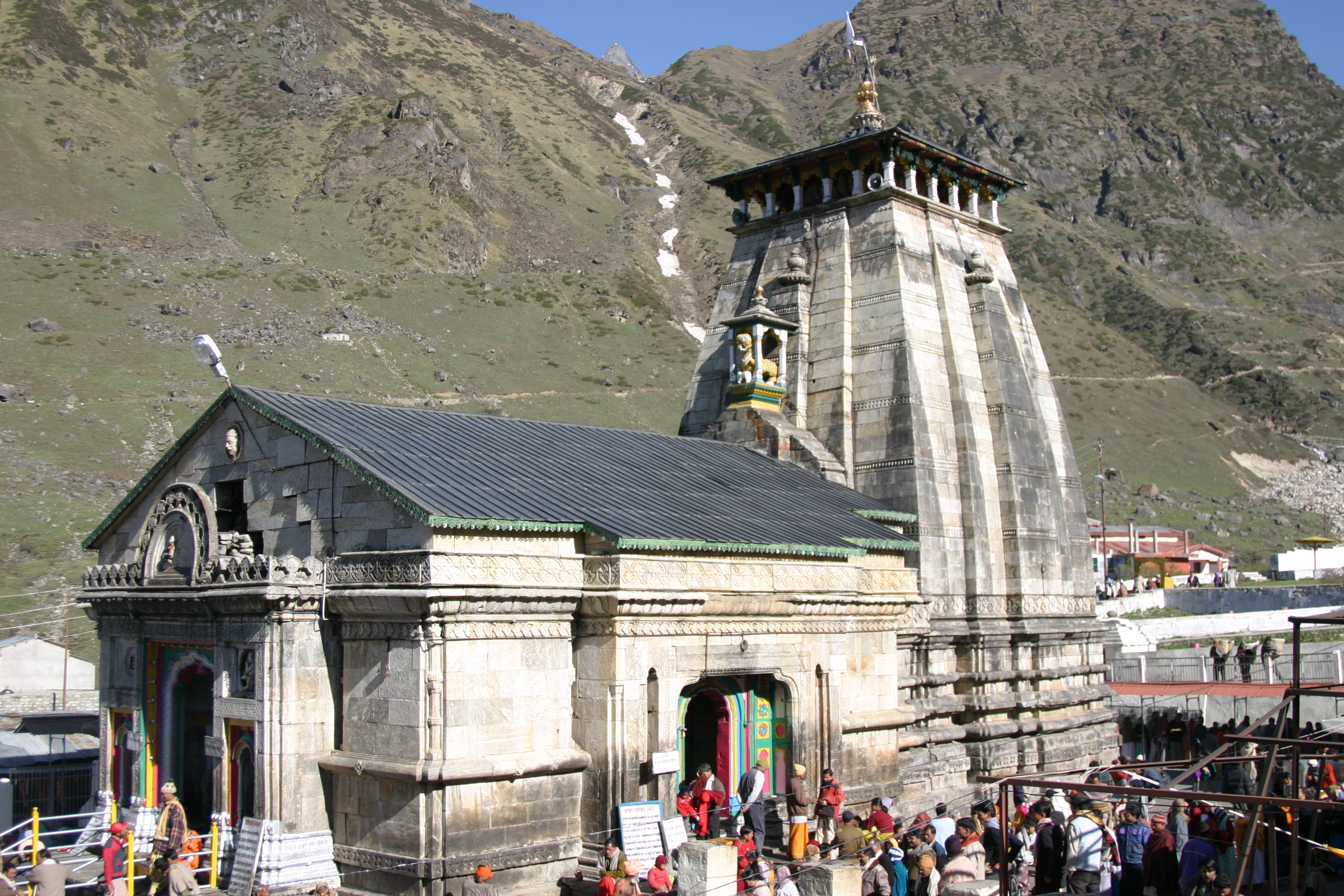
Kedarnath Temple

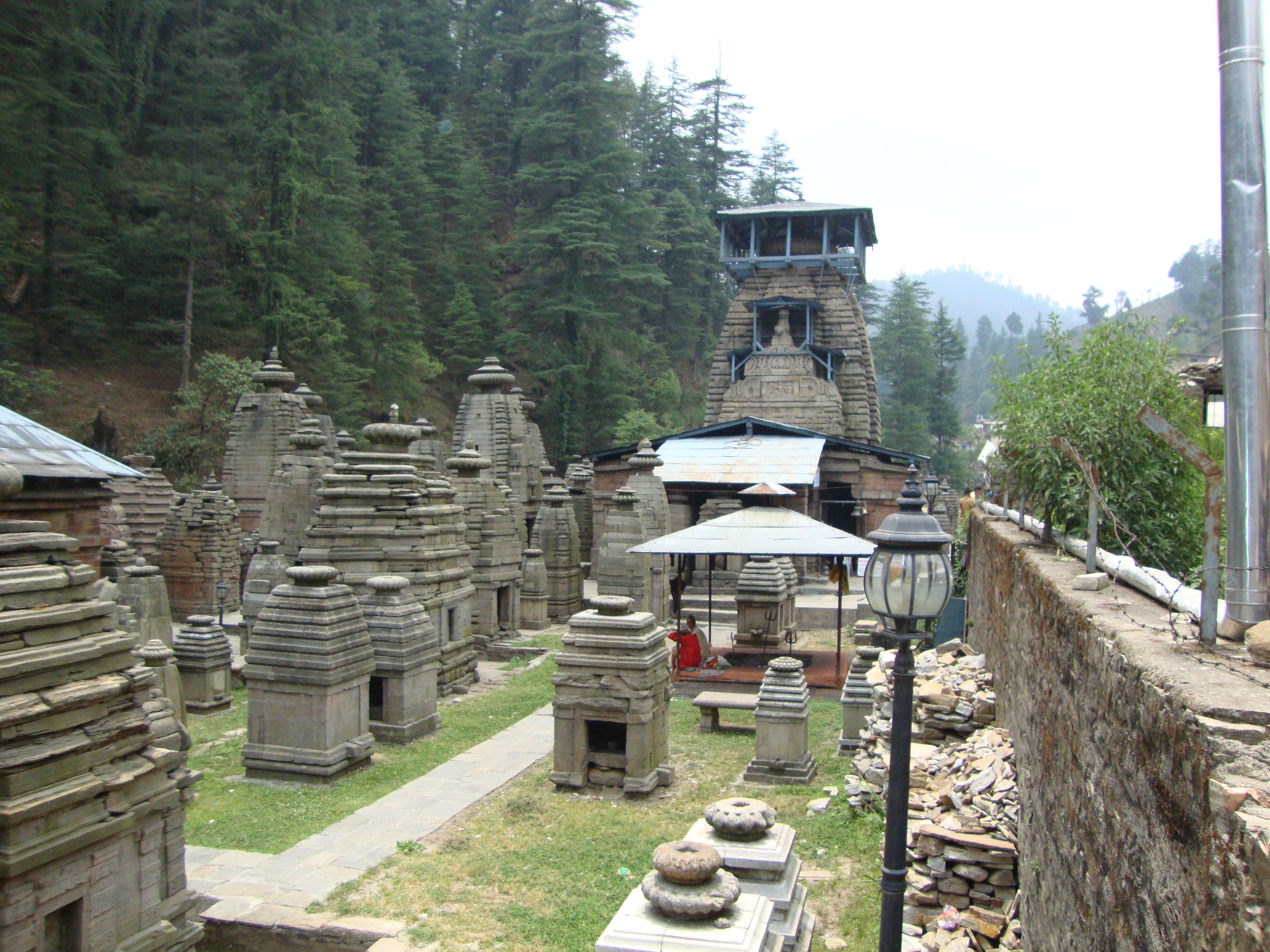
Jageshwar

- Badrinath Temple, Badrinath
- Baleshwar Temple, Champawat
- Binsar Mahadev, Pauri Garhwal
- Chandi Devi Temple, Haridwar
- Daksheswar Mahadev Temple, Kankhal
- Gangotri
- Garjiya Devi Temple, near Ramnagar
- Golu Devata, Chitai
- Gopinath Mandir, Chamoli Gopeshwar
- Gundiyat Gaon
- Guptakashi
- Gurudwara Shri Hemkund Sahib, near Govindghat
- Har Ki Pauri, Haridwar
- Jageshwar
- Kalpeshwar
- Kamanda Mahadev
- Karnaprayag
- Kedarnath Temple, Kedarnath
- Madhyamaheshwar
- Mahasu Devta Temple
- Mansa Devi Temple, Haridwar
- Maya Devi Temple, Haridwar
- Moteshwar Mahadev, Kashipur
- Nandaprayag
- Neelkanth Mahadev Temple, near Rishikesh
- Rishikesh
- Rudranath
- Surkanda Devi, near Mussoorie
- Triyuginarayan Temple
- Tungnath
- Ukhimath

== West Bengal ==
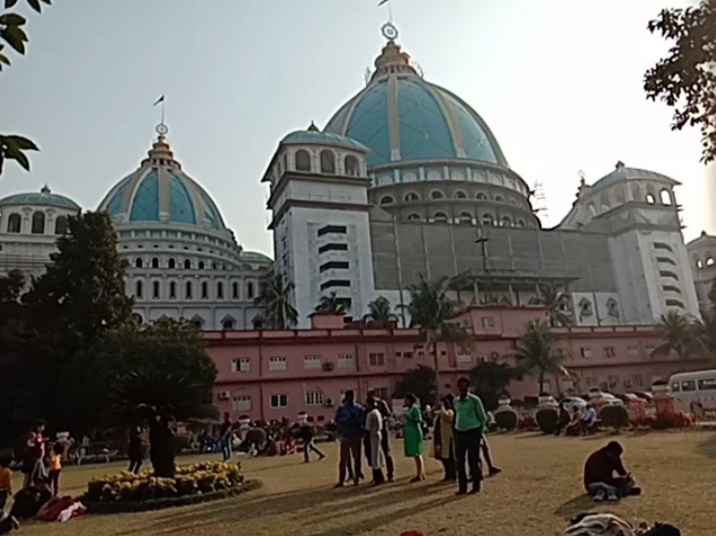
ISKCON Temple

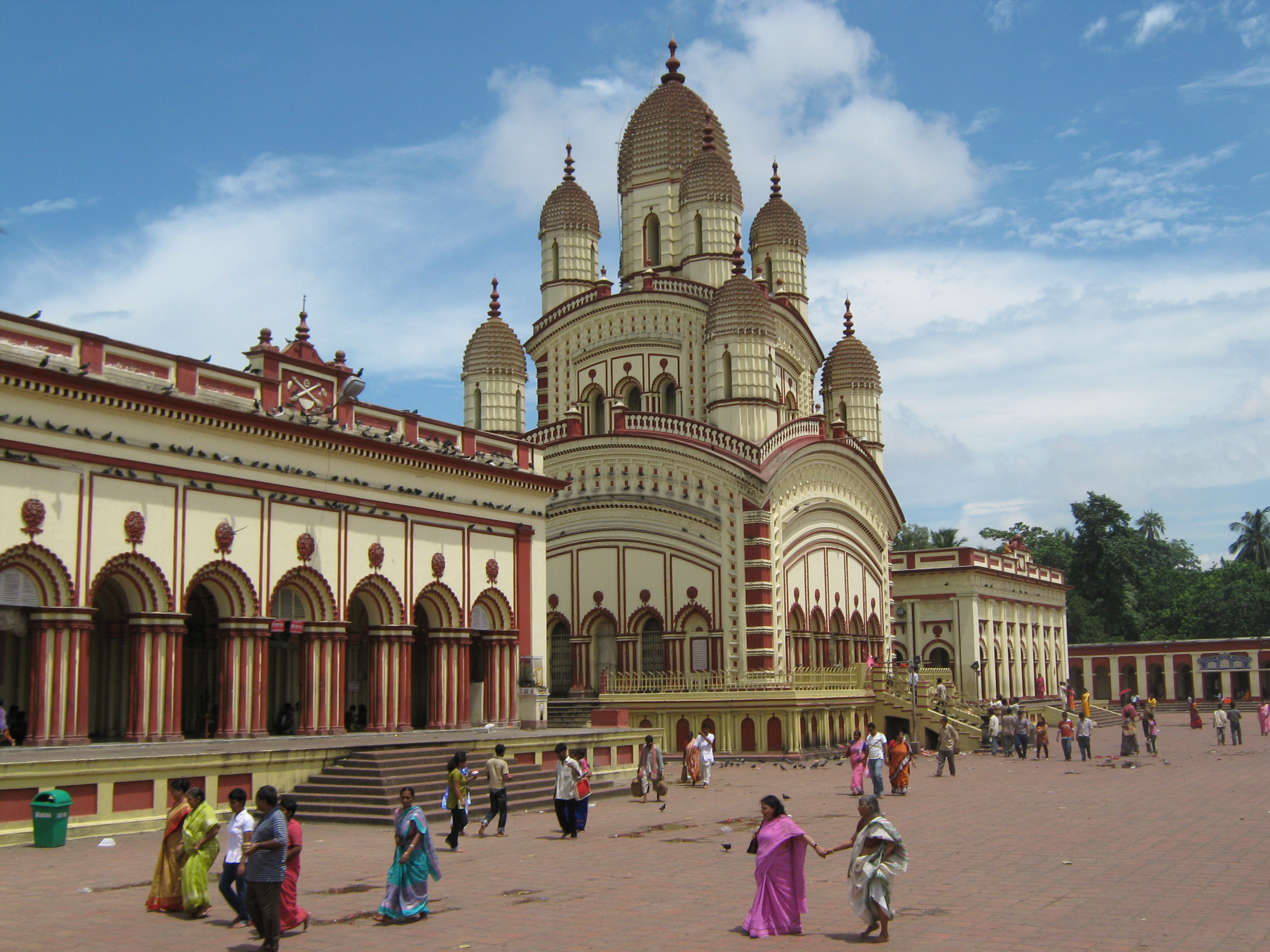
Dakshineswar Kali Temple

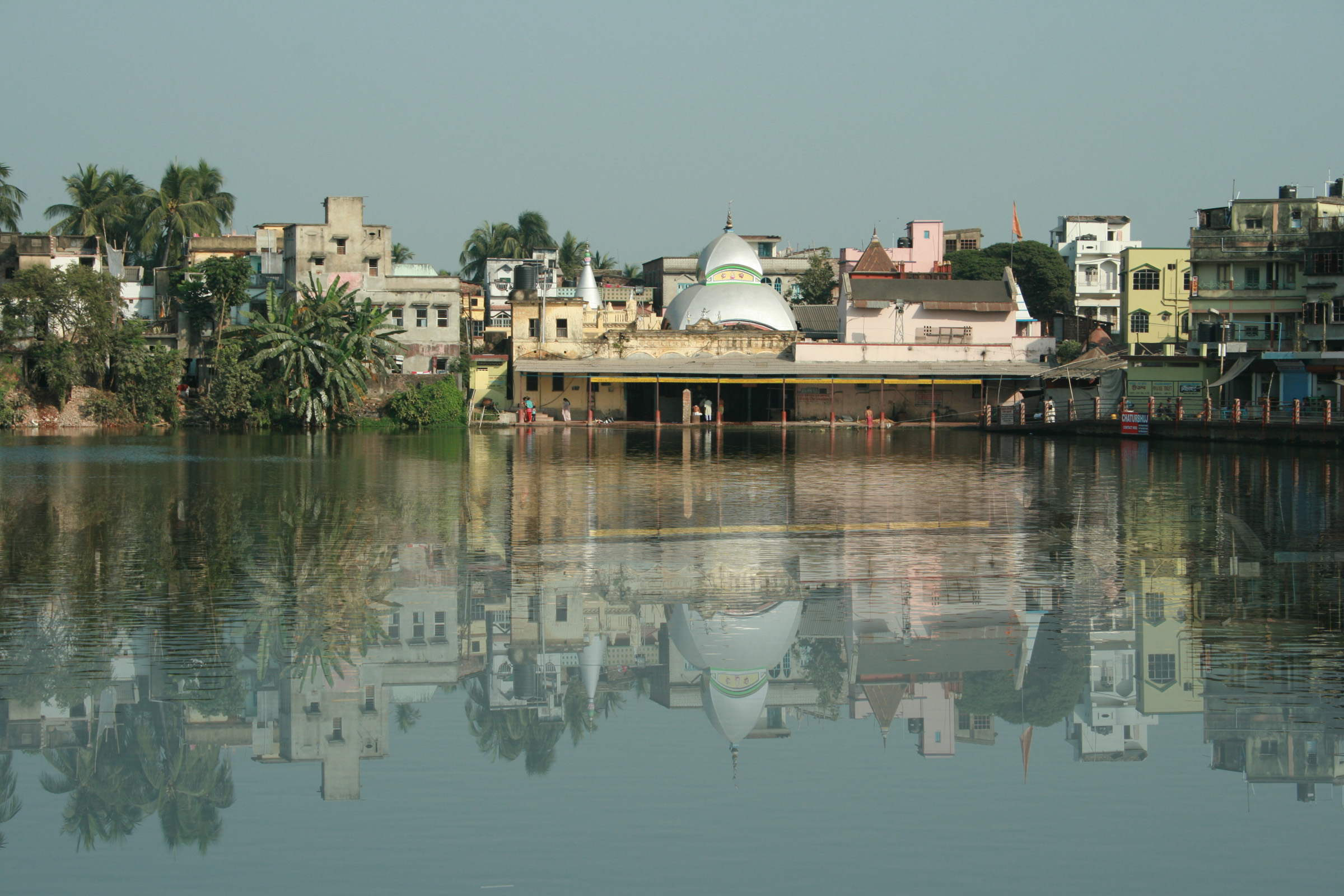
Tarakeswar Taraknath Temple

- Ananta Basudeba Temple, Bansberia
- Annapurna Temple, Titagarh
- Attahas, Purba Bardhaman
- Bahulara Ancient Temple, Bankura
- Baidyapur Jora Deul, Baidyapur
- Bakreswar Temple, Birbhum
- Bargabhima Temple, Tamluk
- Baneswar Shiva Temple, Baneswar
- Begunbari Kali Temple, Purba Medinipur
- Belur Math, Belur
- Bhavaniswar Mandir, Baranagar
- Bhavatarini Shmashanpith Kali Temple, Purba Medinipur
- Bipadtarini Chandibari, Rajpur
- Birla Mandir, Kolkata
- Boro Maa Kali Temple, Naihati
- Brindaban Chandra's Math, Guptipara
- Char Bangla Temples, Baranagar
- Chandrakona Jorbangla Temple, Chandrakona
- Dakshineswar Kali Temple, Dakshineswar
- Dwadash Shiva Temples, Kolkata
- Ekteswar Temple, Ekteswar
- Firinghi Kalibari, Kolkata
- Fullara, Birbhum
- Ghaghar Burhi, Asansol
- Gokulchand Temple, Joypur
- Hangseshwari Temple, Bansberia
- ISKCON Temple, Mayapur
- Jagannath Temple, Digha
- Jalpesh Temple, Mainaguri
- Jatileswar Temple, Jalpaiguri
- Kalighat Kali Temple, Kolkata
- Kalyaneshwari Temple, Bardhaman
- Kamteswari Temple, Gosanimari
- Kanak Durga Temple, Chilkigarh
- Keshabeshwar Temple, South 24 Parganas
- Kiriteswari Temple, Lalbag
- Kotulpur Sridhar Temple, Kotulpur
- Kripamayee Kali Temple, Baranagar
- Krishnarai Jiu Temple, Garbeta
- Lake Kalibari, Kolkata
- Madangopal Jiu Temple, Samta
- Madan Mohan Temple, Cooch Behar
- Maa Manasa Temple, Kharagpur
- Mahakal Temple, Darjeeling
- Malleswara Shiva Temple, Chandrakona
- Nandikeshwari Temple, Sainthia
- Nrisingha Temple, Nadia
- Parvatinatha Temple, Chandrakona
- Radha Madhab Temple, Bishnupur
- Ramkeli Madanmohan Jiu Mandir, Maldah
- Rampara Kalibari, Kolkata
- Ramrajatala Temple, Howrah
- Rasmancha, Bishnupur
- Siddheshwari Kali Mandir, Kalna City
- Shantinatha Shiva Temple, Chandrakona
- Shibnibas, Nadia
- Shobhabazar Lal Mandir, Kolkata
- Taraknath Temple, Tarakeswar
- Tarapith Temple, Birbhum
- Thanthania Kalibari, Kolkata
- Tridhara Milan Mandir, Panchmura

== See also ==
- Lists of Hindu temples
