= List of Bhairava temples =

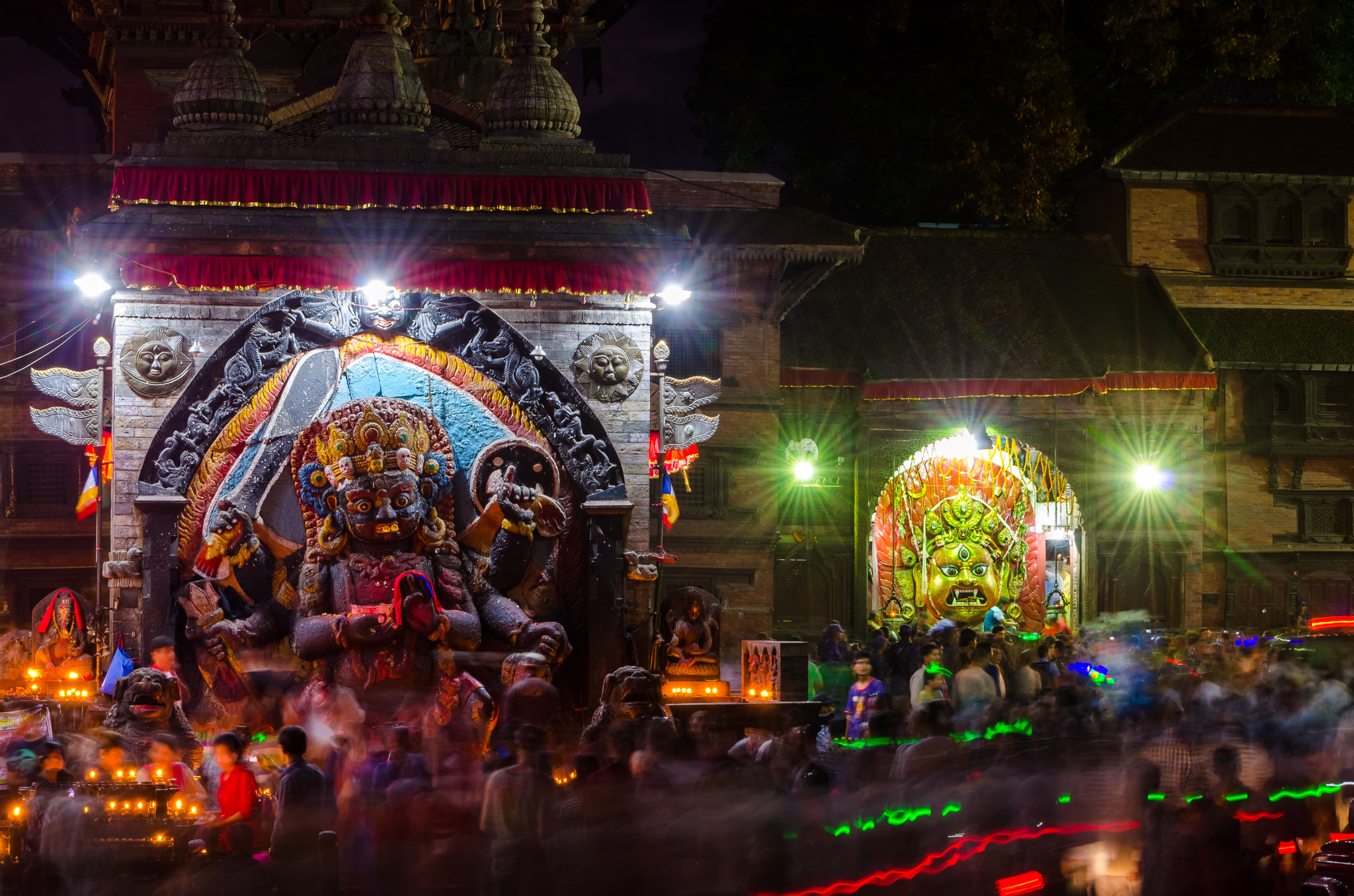
Kala Bhairav and Sweta Bhairav in Kathmandu Durbar Square, Nepal

This is a list of Bhairava temples.

== India ==
=== Andhra Pradesh ===
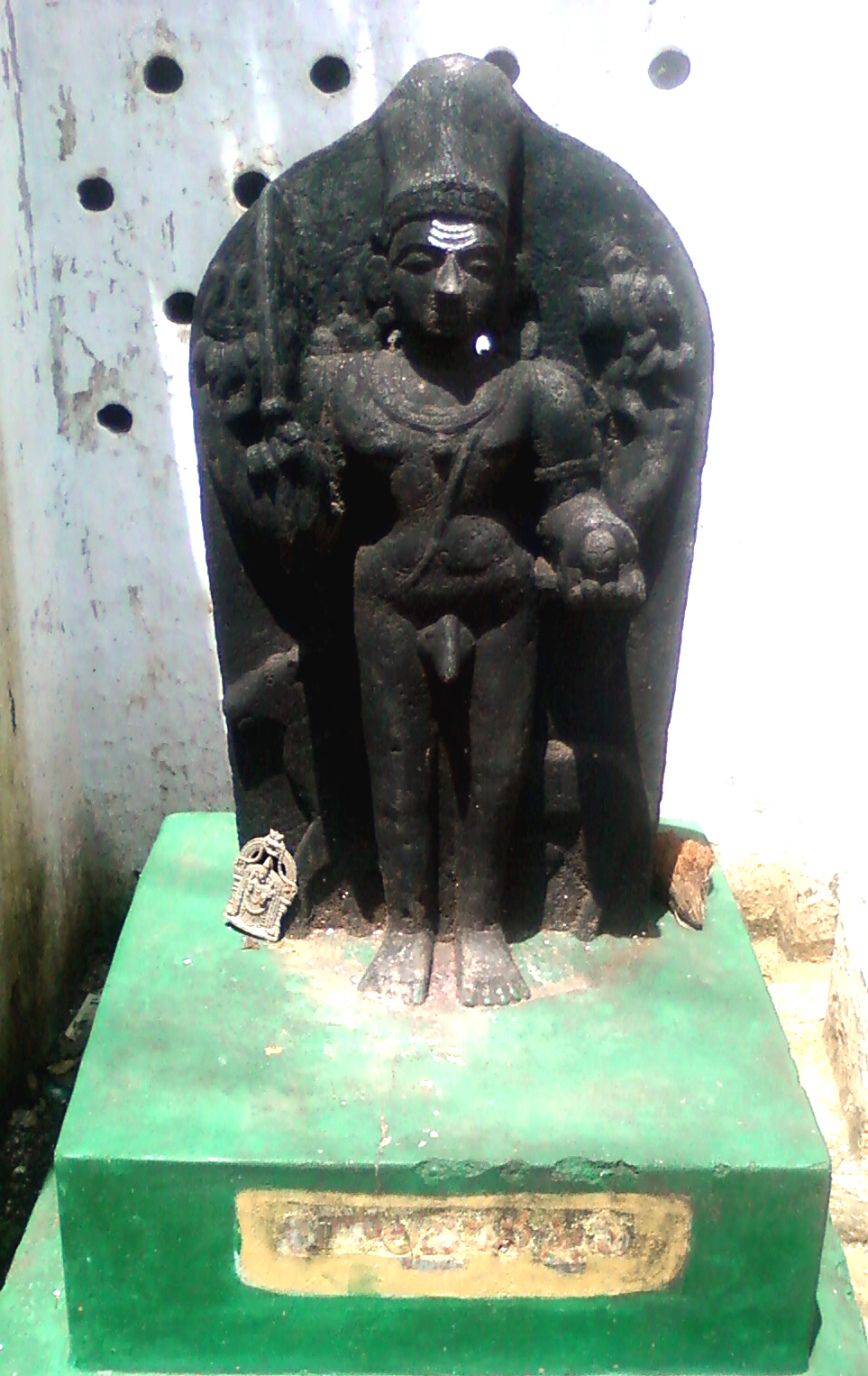
Kalabhairava Statue in Adavivaram, Visakhapatnam district

- Sri Kaala Bhairava temple (inside Sri Manikyamba sametha Bhimeswara Swamy temple), Daksharaamam, East Godavari
- Kalabhairava Guru Sansthan, Kalabhairava Deeksha Ghat, Swarnakarshana Bhairava Swamy, Aryapuram, Rajahmundry
- Sri Kaala Bhairava temple (inside Sri Puruhootika sametha Kukkuteswara swamy temple), Pitapuram, East Godavari District
- Swayambho Sri Sri Sri Bhairava Swamy Temple in Bhimavaram, West Godavari, Andhra Pradesh
- Sri Bhairava Swamy Temple, Ainavilli, East Godavari District
- Sri Kala Bhairava Swamy Temple, Bhairavapalem (near Yanam), East Godavari District
- Naga Bhirava Kona, P.K.Padu, Somasila, SPSR Nellore District, Andhra Pradesh
- Bhairava sela or Bayyanna sela in Srisailam, Andhra Pradesh
- Kaal Bhairva Temple at Ratanpur (considered to be guardian deity of Mahamaya Temple)
- Bhairava Kona, Near Pamur, Prakasam, Andhra Pradesh
- Kala Bhairava in Mruthyunjaya Swamy Temple, Yogimallavaram Village, Near Tirupati, Andhra Pradesh
- Sri Santhana Prapthi Kaala Bhairava, Ramagiri, Andhra Pradesh
- Kala Bhairava in Valeeshwara swamy Temple in Ramagiri Village between Pitchatur and Nagalapuram
- Bhogaswara Swamy Temple Kala Bhairava Swamy near Nandyal Kurnool district
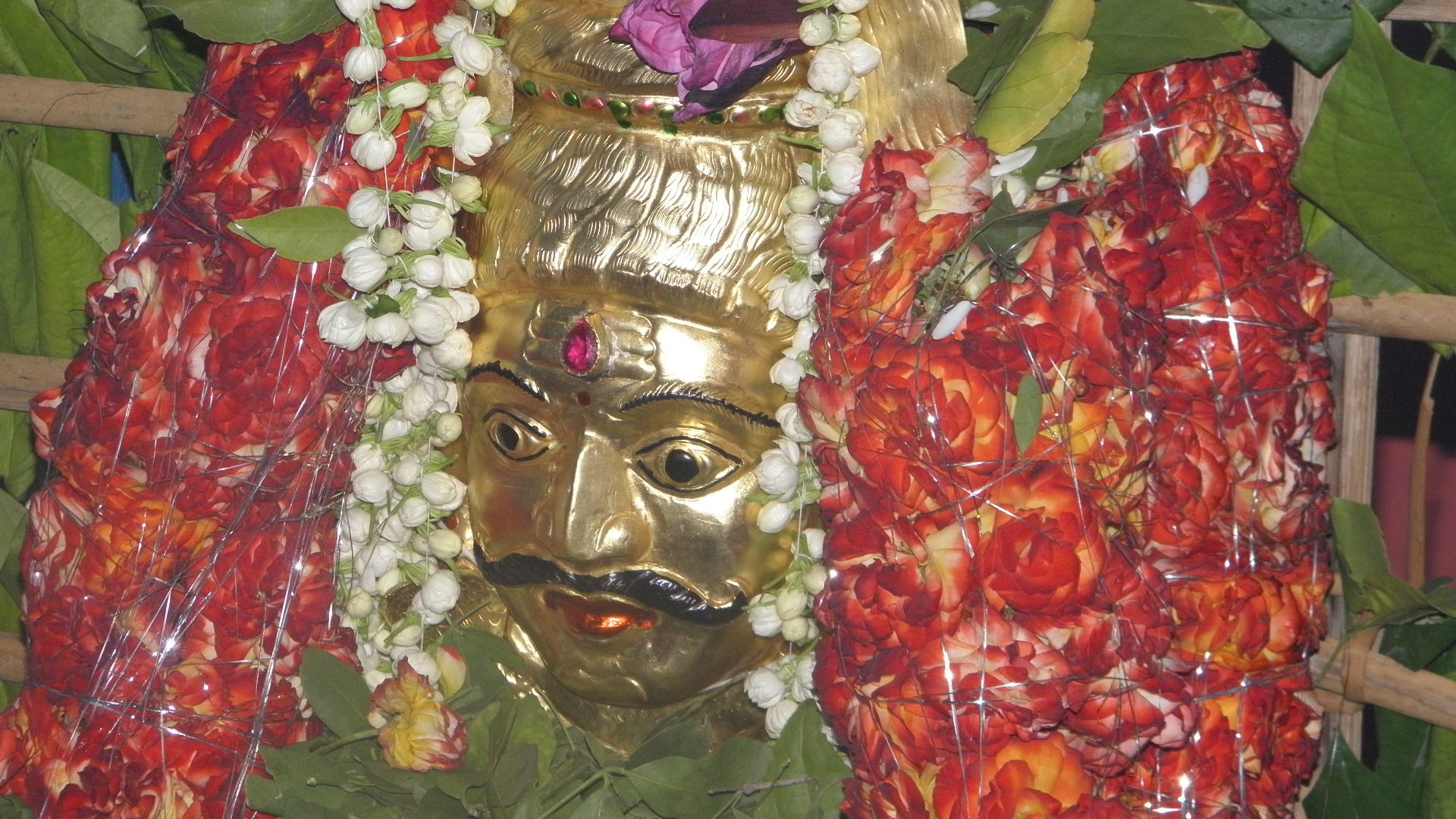
- Kalabhairava Temple Siddarampuram Village Anantapur
  Kalabhairava Temple, Siddarampuram, Anantapur district
- Skandagiri Temple, Secunderabad
- Bhairava Swamy Temple, Bhairavavaaka, Simhachalam, Visakhapatnam
- Sri Asta Kala Biarava Swamy Temple, Bommarsapalli, Chittorr
- Sri Kala Bhairava Swamy Temple, near Gram Panchayath, G. Moolapalem, Yedurlanka, East Godavari
- Sri Kaala Bhairaveswara Temple, Seelamvaripalle, Yellutla, Gurramkonda, Annamayya district, Andhra Pradesh-517305.

=== Assam ===
- Mahabhairav Temple, Tezpur, Assam

=== Bihar ===
- Kaal Bahairav Temple, Bhagalpur, Barhara, Rampatti, Madhubani.

=== Delhi and NCR ===
- Shri Kilkari Bhairava Temple, near Purana Qila, New Delhi, Delhi.
- Pracheen Kaal Bhairav Mandir and Swarn Akarshan Bhairav Mandir, Jhandewalan Extension, New Delhi
- Prachin Kaal Bhairav Mandir, near Purana Qila, New Delhi, Delhi
- Pracheen Bhairava Temple, Nehru Place, New Delhi, Delhi
- Prachin Shri Batuk Bhairav Mandir, Nehru Park New Delhi

=== Goa ===
- Kalabhairav Temple, Dhargal

=== Gujarat ===
- Bhairavnath Temple, Maninagar, Ahmedabad, Gujarat
- Shree Kala Bhairavnath Mahadev, NH-8, Bhairav Gaun, Kamrej, Surat, Gujarat
- Batuk Bhairav Temple, Bidada, Kutch district, Gujarat
- Kaal Bhairav Temple, Idar outskirts, Aravalli Range, Gujarat
- Ashta Bhairav Temple, Sidhpur, Gujarat
- Bhairavnath Temple, Palitana, Bhavnagar district, Gujarat
- Bhairava Japa, sacred jumping rock, Girnar Mountain, Junagadh
- Kaal Bhairavdada Temple, Patan, Patan district, Gujarat
- Kalbhairavnath Mahadev Temple, Bhairav, Surat district, Gujarat
- Kaal bhairav temple, Sarsai, Visavadar, Junagadh
- Kaal Bhairav Temple, Kerali Village, Rajkot, Gujarat

=== Himachal Pradesh ===
- Mahakal Vajra Bhairava Temple, Lahul Spiti district, Himachal Pradesh
- Batuk Bhairav Temple, Mandi, Himachal Pradesh

=== Jammu and Kashmir ===
- Bhairav Temple, Vaishnodevi complex, Jammu and Kashmir

=== Jharkhand ===
- Bhomia ji Temple at Jain Swetambar Kothi, Madhuban, Jharkhand

=== Karnataka ===
- Sri Pralayakalada Veerabhadra Swamy Temple, Gavipuram
- Bhairav Picture inside Aakash Bhairav Temple
- Kannalli Sri Veerabhadra Swamy Temple, Sukeshtra
- Sri Veerabhadra Swamy Temple, Thindlu
- Jodi Veerabhadra Swamy Temple, Machohalli
- Sri Veerabhadra Swamy Temple, Mallasandra
- Sri Veerabhadra Swamy Temple hill, Banashankari.
- Sri Veerabhadra Swamy Temple, Hagadur.
- Sri Veerabhadra Swamy Temple, Vasudevapuram.
- Sri Veerabhadra Swamy Temple, Attur Layout.
- Sri Bhadrakali Ammanavara Sametha Sri Veerabhadra Swamy Devalaya, Devarahosahalli.
- Sri Veerabhadra Swamy Temple, Anugondanahalli., Bengaluru, Karnataka.
- Sri Kalabhairaveswara swamy Temple, Sri Kshetra Adichunchanagiri, Mandya Dt.
- Sri Mahakala Bhairava Temple, Karamogaru, Gurupura, Mangalore Taluk, Dakshina Kannada District
- Sri Kalabhairaveshwara Swamy Temple and Chikkarasinakere Basava (Holy Bull), Chikkarasinakere, Maddur Taluk, Mandya District
- Sri Ananda Kalabhairava temple (Nithyananda peetham Bengaluru Aadheenam, Bidadi
- Kalabhairaveshvara Temple, Double Road, 4th cross, Rajarajeswari Nagar, Bangalore, Karnataka
- Shri Seethi Bhairaveshwara Swamy Temple, Seethi, Kolar
- Shree Kala Bhairava Temple, Jadigenahally, Hoskote, Bangalore, Karnataka
- Shree Bhyraveshwara Temple, Totanahalli, Nelamangala Taluk, Bangalore, Karnataka
- Sri Byraveshwara Swamy Temple siddana lane cubbonpete, Bangalore
- Kaala Bhairava Temple, Yana, Uttara Kannada
- Kalabhairaveshvara Temple at Adichunchanagiri
- Kaala Bhairava Temple, Dubalgundi, Near Homnabad, Bidar
- Kalabhairaveshvara Temple at Jogi Mutt, Kadri, Mangalore
- Kala Bhairava Temple, Gadag
- Khala bhirava Temple, which is there in Skanada Purana, Taranagara village, Sandur Taluk, Bellary.
- Mahakala Bhairava Temple, Near Gurupura Bridge, Karamogaru, Mangalore-Moodbedra Highway
- Kalabhairaveshvara Temple at Guthi village, Mudigere Taluk, Chikmagalur
- Nanhya Bhairaveshvara temple at Byrapura, Mudigere Taluk, Chickmagalur
- Shree Kala Bhairava Prasanna temple at Dodballapura village.
- Sri Kalabhairava Swamy temple, Settikere, chikkanayakanahalli taluk, Tumkur District, Karnataka

=== Kerala ===
- Njarakattu sri bhagavathi bhairava Temple, Kedamangalam
- Bhairavaswami Kshetram, Ambalappuzha
- Kalabhairava Bhoothathan Temple in Pothencode, Trivandrum.

=== Madhya Pradesh ===
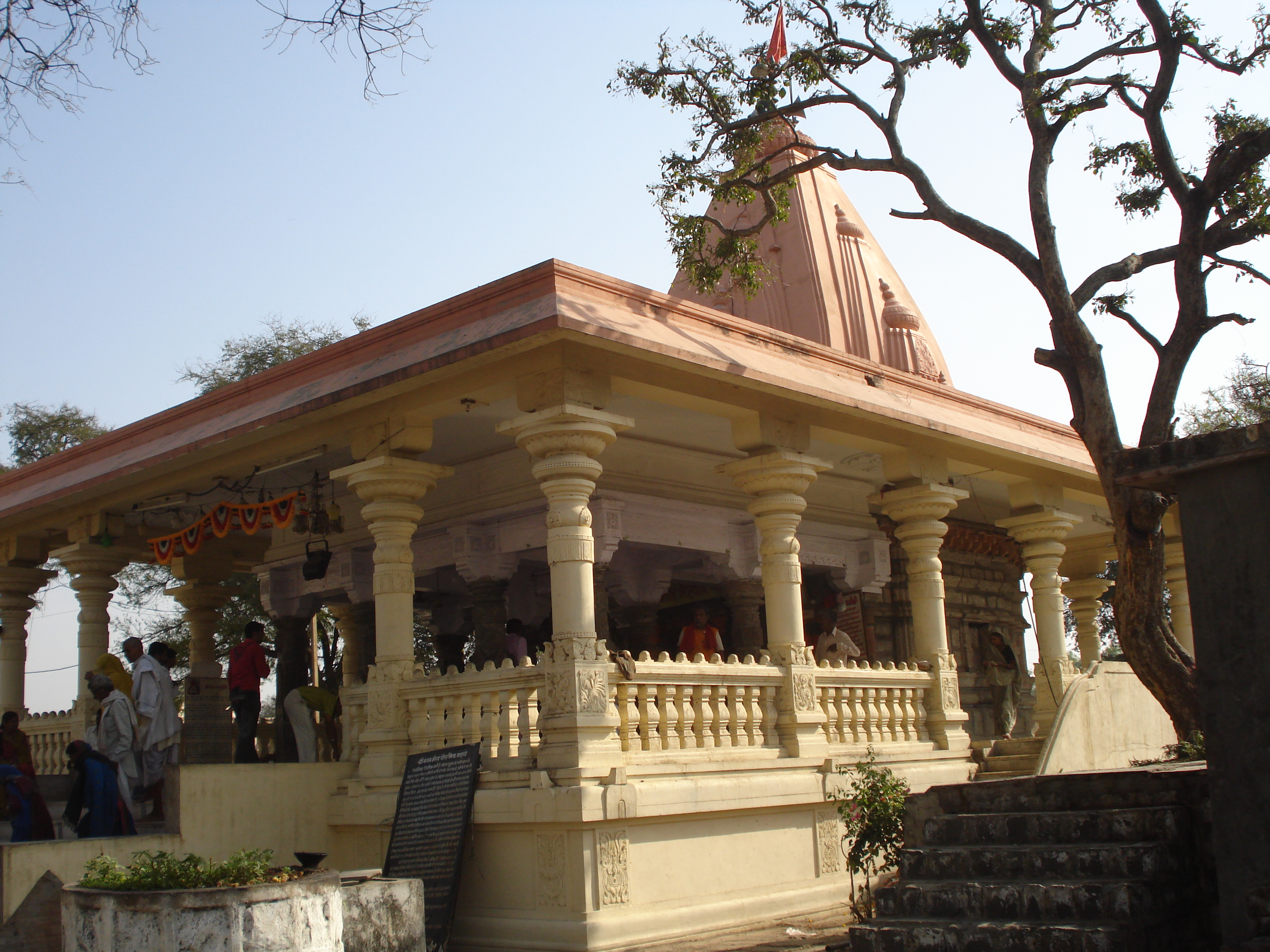
Kalabhairava Temple, Ujjain

- Kal Bhairav temple, Ujjain, Madhya Pradesh
- Shri Kala Bhairav Naath Temple Adegaon Madhya Pradesh
- Shri Toriya Bhairav Temple, Panch Kuti Toriya, Datiya, Madhya Pradesh
- Bajnamath Tantrik Bhairav Temple, Jabalpur, Madhya Pradesh
- Bhairav Nath temple, Gudh, Rewa, Madhya Pradesh

=== Maharashtra ===
- Shri Kalabhairavanath Temple, Agadgaon, Tal & Dist, Ahmadnagar
- Shri Kaal Bhairav Nath Hedavde Mahalaxmi Mandir, Hedavde, Hedavde Devi on River Tansa, Mumbai
- Bhairavnath Temple, Avasari (Khurd), Ambegaon, Pune
- Kaal bhairav Temple, Katraj, Pune
- Kaal Bhairav Temple, Kharadi, Pune
- Bhairavnath Mandir, Ankoli, Solapur
- Shree Kalbhairav Mandir, Hindale, Devgad Sindhudurg
- Kaal Bhairav Temple, Jyotiba, Wadi Ratnagiri, Kolhapur
- Kaal Bhairavnath Temple, Sonari, Paranda, Osmanabad
- The Kaal Bhairav Nath Mandir, Panchvati, Saptashrungi Devi on Rive Godavari, Nashik
- Bhairavnath Temple, Sinnar, Nashik
- The Kaal Bhairav Nath Mandir Varne, Satara
- Shri KalBhairavnath Jogeshwari Temple, A/P-Bavdhan, Wai, Satara
- Shri KalBhairavnath Mandir, Kasba Peth, Pune (also known as Nava kal Bhairavnath Mandir)
- Shri Siddhanath Temple, Mhaswad, Tal-Man, Dist Satara
- Shri Bhairavnath Temple, Kikali, Tal-Wai, Dist Satara
- Shri Bhairavnath Temple, Thorgavan Tal Raver, Dist Jalgaon.
- Shri Kaal Bairavnath Temple Bahirwadi Taluka Newasa Dist Ahmednagar Maharashtra
- Kaal Bhairav Temple, Brahman alli, Bhind Post Office, Bhiwandi, Thane, Maharashtra.
- Kalbhairav temple, Gadhinglaj, DIST: Kolhapur, Maharashtra.
- Bhairav baba Temple, Pulgaon camp, Dist- Wardha
- Shri Bhairavnath Mandir, Jarud Tq & Dist.Beed
- Kaal Bhairavnath temple Bahirwadi (Purandar), Pune
- Kaal Bhairavnath temple Kusgao, Khed Shivapur, Pune
- Kaal Bhairavnath Temple, Mehendale Garage Chowk, near Mhatre Bridge, Erandwane, Pune - 411004
- Jagadamba Kalbhairav Temple, Maja's Wadi, Jogeshwari East, Mumbai 60, Maharashtra.
- Shri Bhairavnath and Shani Mandir, Old Mumbai-Pune Highway, Khandala, Maharashtra
- Shri Bhairavnath Temple, Rajmachi, Maharashtra
- Shri Kalbhairav Temple Jarud, Dist: Beed, Taluka Beed
- Shri KalBhairavnath Temple Billur, Dist: Sangli, Taluka Jath
- Shri Bhaireshvar Temple, Shirti, Dist. Kolhapur, Tal. Shirol

=== Orissa ===
- Ajaikapada Bhairava Temple, Nuagaon, Jagatsinghpur, Odisha

=== Punjab ===
- Pracheen Shri Kaal Bhairav Mandir, Dhuri, Sangrur, Punjab

=== Rajasthan ===
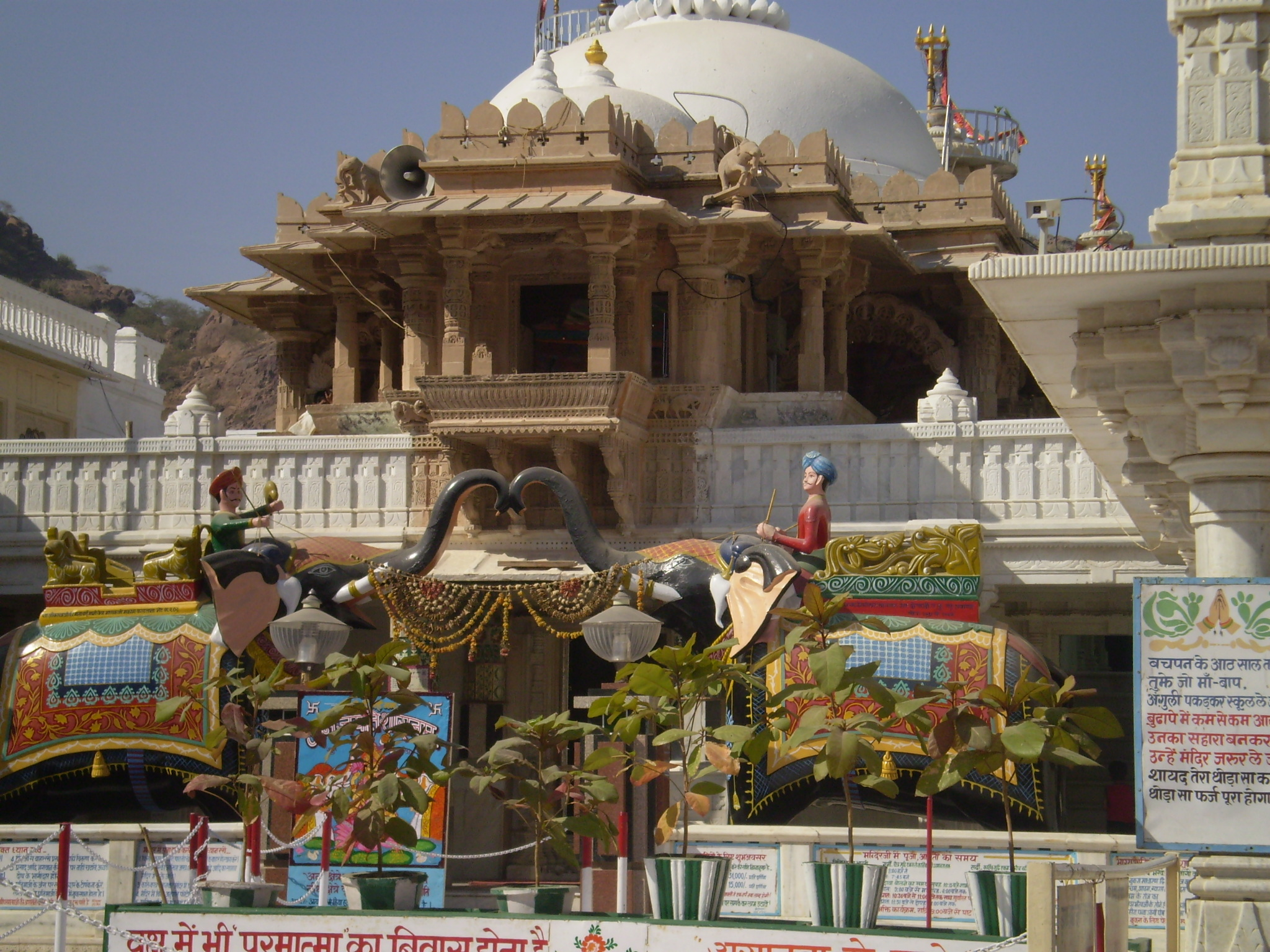
Nakodaji Teerth

- Shree Masaniya Bhairav Dham, Rajgarh, Ajmer
- Shree Khoda Masaniya bhairav temple, Kheda Bhansol, Udaipur
- Sri Musaanya Bhairu Baba Temple at Ringus, Sikar
- Jai Shri Bhairunath Bawji Temple, Shishoda village near Nathdwara, Rajasthan
- Chomukha Bhairavji Temple, Kharkhara, Khetri, Rajasthan
- Shree DakshinMukhi Kaal Bhairav Temple Dhanapura, Pali district, Rajasthan
- Shri Kala Bhairava Temple, Amer Fort, Jaipur, Rajasthan
- Bhairuji Mandir, Village-Tehsil - Ladnun, Nagaur, Rajasthan
- Kala-Gora Bhairav Mandir, Mandore, Jodhpur, Rajasthan
- Bhairav Mandir, Barli, Jodhpur, Rajasthan
- Kala Bhairav Temple at Toliasar, Sri Dungargarh, Rajasthan
- Kodamdesar Ramdevra Temple, Jaisalmer Highway, Rajasthan
- Sri Nakoda Bhairav Jain Temple, Barmer District, Rajasthan
- Kodamdesar Bhairav mandir, dist. Bikaner [rajasthan]
- Shri Raktya Bhairav mandir, Mundali anta, Baran
- Shri Jhanjhirampurawale Bhairuji Maharaj, hanjhirampura, Baswa, dausa Rajasthan
- Shri Bavdi Vale Batuk Bhairava Temple, Kartarpura, Jaipur, Rajasthan
- Sonona khetlaji Mandir sonona near desuri Rajasthan
- Kala-gora ji temple, Bhairav gate, Sawai madhopur, Rajasthan
- Shri Bhairu Baba temple, Kuchhipala(Gachhipura) near Degana

=== Tamil Nadu ===
- Kalabhairavar Temple, bhairavar temple Swarna Bairva Peedam, Erode, Tamilnadu
- Kalabairavar Temple, Melapanaiyur Village, Mudukulathur, Ramanathapuram [Dist]
- அருள்மிகு காலபைரவர் கோவில் (Bairavar Temple), Morepalayam, Tiruchengode - Salem Main Rd, Namakkal

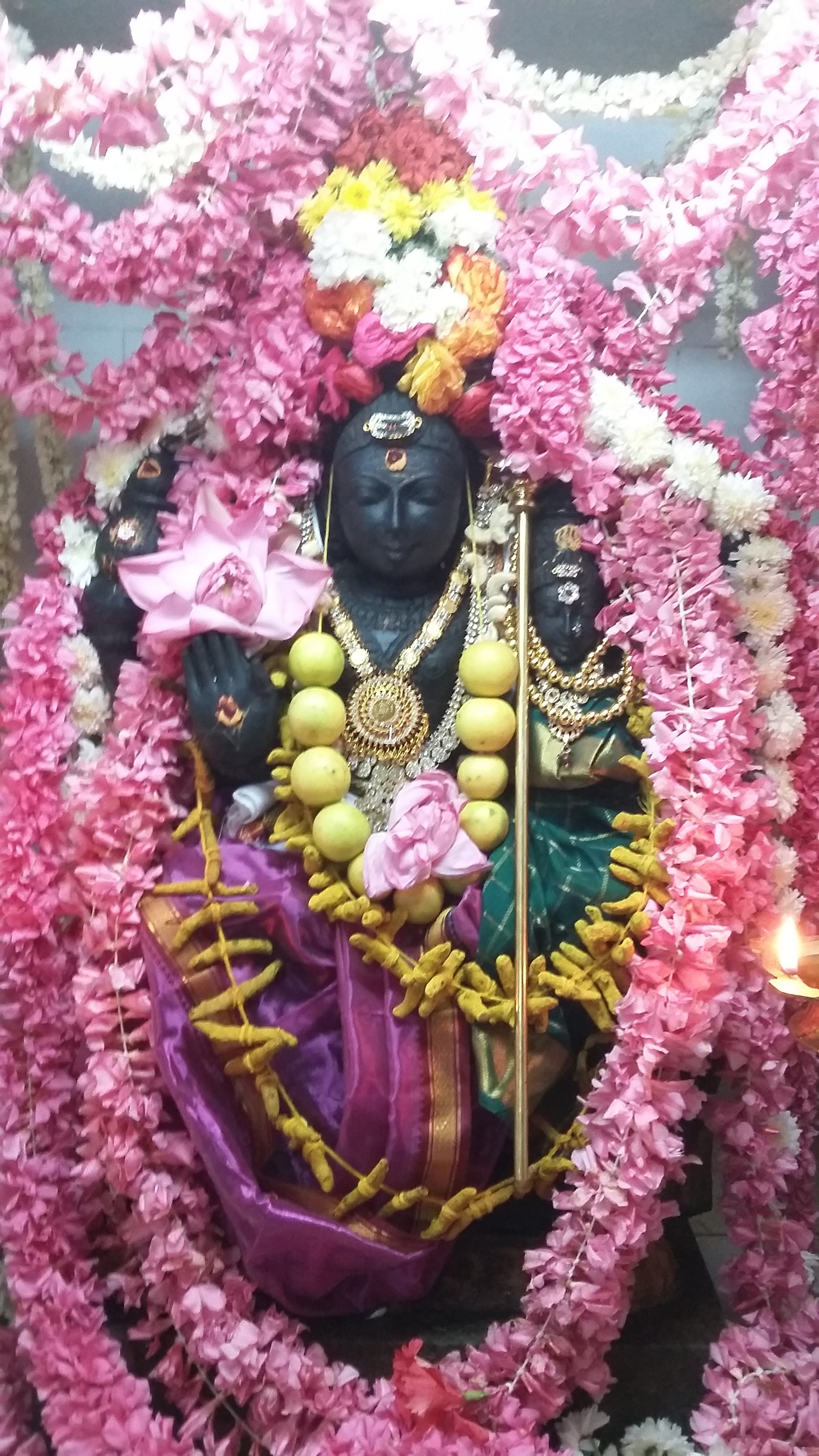
Sri SwarnaBairavi Samedha Sri SwarnaAakarshana Bairavar Lloyds Colony, Royapettah, Chennai-14, Tamil Nadu

- Arulmigu Soundaraja Perumal Temple, Thadikombu, Dindugul
- Kasi Kalabairavar Temple - Adiyamaan Kottai, 8 km (5.0 mi) from Dharmapuri in Dharmapuri district
- Sri Maha Kala Bairavar Temple, Dhombaram bedu village, Uthukottai Taluk, Thiruvallur district
- Sri Kala Bairavar Temple, Thennagudi (North), Thanjavur (District), Tamil Nadu.
- Sri Kala Bairavar Temple, Oyyamaari Burial Ground, Odathurai Road, Sanjeevi Nagar, Tiruchirappalli, Tamil Nadu
- Sri Baala Kaala Bhairavar Temple at T. Vairavanpatty, near Thirukoshityur
- Kalabhairavar, Kayantha Sthanam, Nanjundapuram, Coimbatore
- Kalabhairavar, Kurunallipalayam, Vadachittur (Via), Coimbaote
- Sri Kalabhairavar Temple (Lingam shape Bhairavar), Kallukurikkai, Krishnagiri.
- Kalabhairav Temple at Adhiyaman Kottai, Dharmapuri district, Tamil Nadu
- Sri Kala Bhairava Temple pogular village, Gudiyattam, Tamil Nadu
- Sri Swarna Kala Bhairavar Peedam, Kaga Ashram, Thiruvannamalai, Tamil Nadu
- Kala Bhairava Temple, Courtallam, Tamil Nadu
- Ashta Bhairavar at Sri Kamanada Eswar temple, Aragalur, near Chinna Salem, Tamil Nadu
- Bhairavar Temple, Vairavan Patti, Karaikudi, Tamil Nadu
- Sri Kottai Bairavar - Thirumayam (Pudhukottai Dist) located in national highway Pudhukottai to Rameswaram
- Bhairaveswarar Temple, Cholapuram, Kumbakonam, Tamil Nadu
- Sri Vairavamoorthy, Illupaikudi Temple, Karaikudi, Tamil Nadu
- Konguvadukanatha Swami, Kundadam, Dharapuram, Tamil Nadu
- Kala Bhairavar Temple, Pogular village, Gudiyattam Town, Tamil Nadu (3,000 years old, surrounded by mountains)
- Swarna Akarshana Bhairavar at Thadikombu Perumal Temple, Dindigul, Tamil Nadu
- Kaalabairavar Temple, Thiruneermalai, Chennai
- Maha Bhairava Rudhra Aalayam, Bhairavar Nagar, Thiruvadisoolam Road, Echankaranai, Chengalpattu, Tamil Nadu
- Bairavar Koil, Thirupattur, Sivaganga dis.Tamil Nadu
- Sri Bhairavar Malai Koil, a serene hill temple in a less inhabited area near Venbedu village approx. 23 km (14 mi) from Chengalpattu & 8 km (5.0 mi) from Thiruporur.
- Sri Mahakalabhairavar Aalayam, Dhombarambedu village, Uthukottai - 602026, Thiruvallur District, Tamil Nadu.
- Sri Maha Bhiravar, Renganathapuram, Near Bodinayakkanur, Theni dt, Tamil Nadu
- Sri SwarnaBairavi Samedha Swarna Aakarshana Bairavar temple, Lloyds Colony, Royapettah, Chennai-14, Tamil Nadu
- Sri kala Bahairva temple, Kandhikuppam, Krishnagiri, Tamil Nadu
- Sri Swarna Kala Bhairavar Temple, Akkaraippatty, Salem, Tamil Nadu - 636 306.
- Sri Swarna aharshna bairavar temple, sri athmanatheswarar temple - Menambedu, Ambattur O.T, Chennai-53, Tamil Nadu
- Kala Bhairavar temple, Thagatur, Nagaipattinam, Tamil Nadu
- Maha Kalabhairava Temple, (more than 1000 year old) Seeyathamangai, Nannilam, Nagai, Tamil Nadu.
- Kala Bhairavar temple Ramapuram, ayilam village Walaja taluk Vellore dt Tamil Nadu
- Kala Bharavar Temple, East Avani Moola Street, Near Ezhukadal Street and Pudhmandapam, Madurai

=== Telangana ===
- Dasa Bhairava Temple, Ramaneswaeam, Nagireddipalle, Bhongir, Yadadri Bhongir District.
- Sri Kalabhairava Swamy Temple at Ramareddy near Kamareddy, Nizamabad district
- Kala Bhairava Temple in Kajipalli Medak Mandal
- Sri Kalabhairava Swamy Temple, Parpelly Village which is 10 km (6.2 mi) from Chinnoor, Manchiryal District
- Sri Kala Bhairava Swamy Temple, Medchal, Medchal-Malkajgiri district
- Sri Kalabhirava Swamy temple, Balaji Nagar, Suryapet, Suryapet

=== Uttarakhand ===
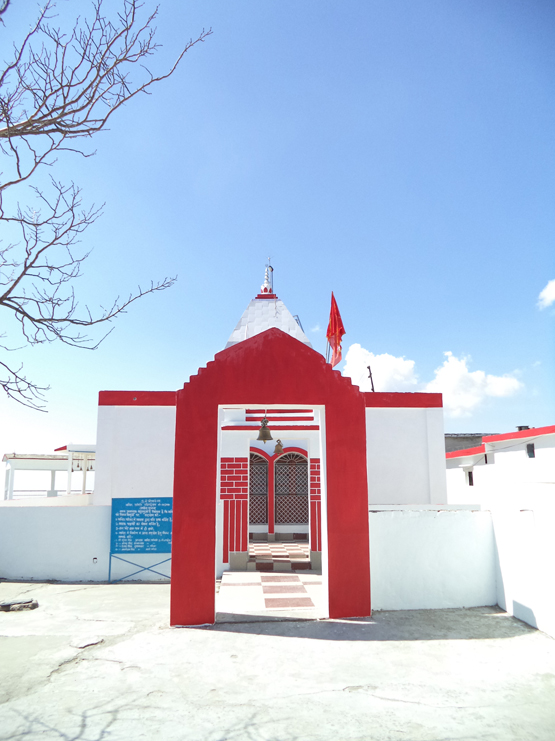
Bhairon Baba temple at Langur patti, Pauri Garhwal, Uttarakhand, India.

- Bhairavnath Temple, Kedarnath
- Deep nath Bhairav, Nageshwar, Srinagar, Uttarakhand
- Bhairavnath Mandir, Gorakshnath Gufs, Srinagar, Uttarakhand
- Bhairav Temple, Near Uttarkashi
- Bhairav Temple, Bhairon Ghati, before Gangotri
- Nadbudh Bhairava Temple, Molthi, Patti Paidulsyun, Pauri Garhwal
- Bhairon Garhi, Gumkhal, Pauri Garhwal
- Bhairav Temple, Bangdwara, Tehri Garhwal
- Asht Bhairav Temple, Ukhimath
- Eight Bhairav Temples, Almora
- Bhairav Temple, Bageshwar
- Kal Bhairav Temple, Devprayag
- Bhairavnath Temple,
- Gram Pipli-Ghurdaursyu, Pauri Garhwal, Uttarakhand
- Bhairav Temple, Rishikesh
- Shri Kaleshwar Bhairav Nath Temple Karnaprayag

=== Uttar Pradesh ===
- Kala Bhairava Temple, Varanasi
- Pracheen Bada Lal Bhairav, Vidhyanchal, Mirzapur district
- Kal Bhairav Temple, Allahabad
- Kal Bhairav Temple, Shrinagar district, Mahoba
- Kaal Bhairav Temple, Balughat Shuklaganj, Unnao
- Bhairav Baba Temple, Meerut
- Bhairav Ji Temple, Jalaun, Jalaun
- Mandir Thakur Bhairon Nath Ji, Satghada, Inside Holi Gate, Mathura

=== West Bengal ===
- Kaal Bhairava mandir of Tara Shankari Peeth, at Kolkata
- Nakuleshwar Bhairav Mandir of Kalighat, at Kolkata
- Bhairavsthan, submerged temples of Telkupi, Near Dhanbad

== Nepal ==
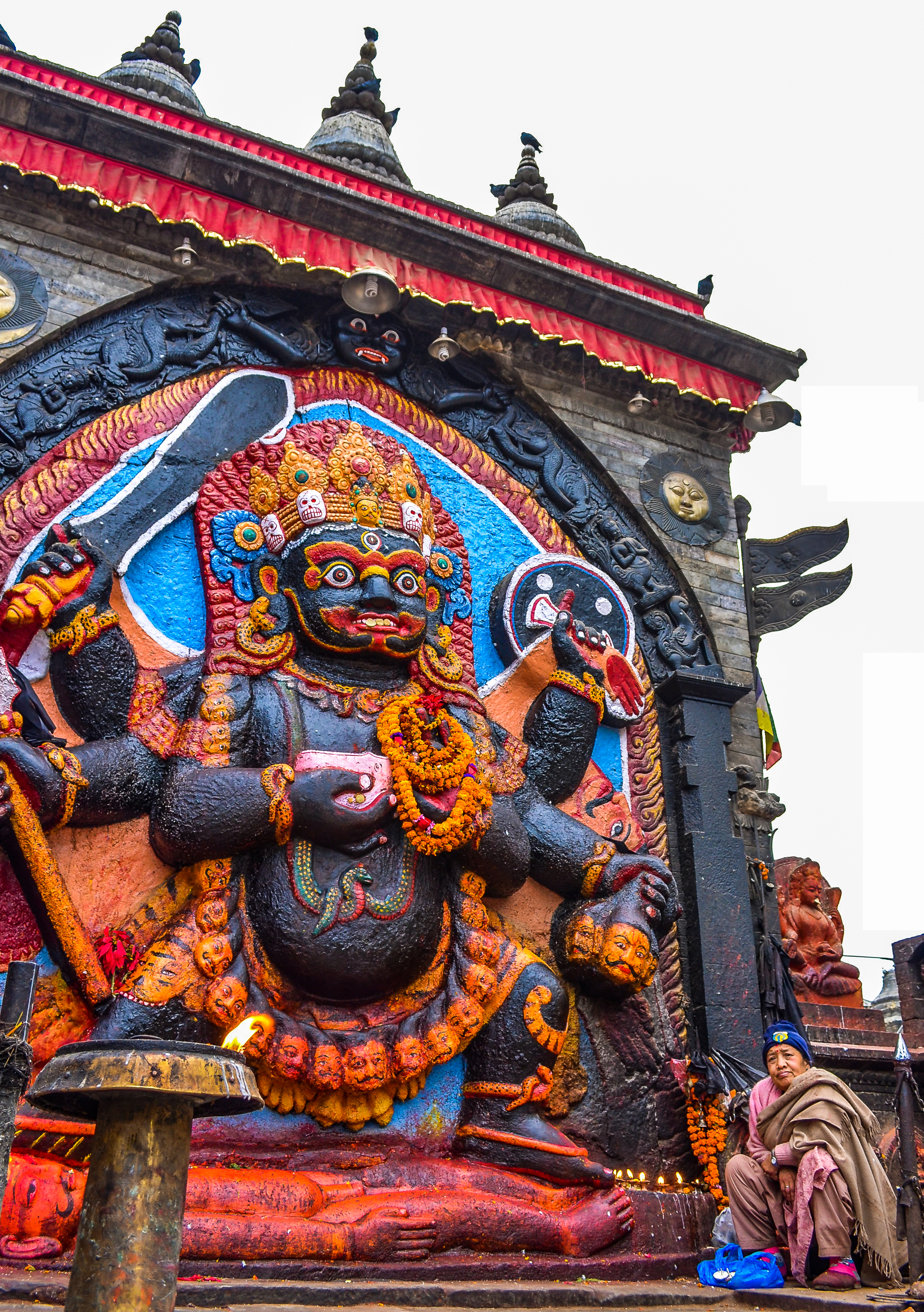
Kaal Bhairav, Kathmandu Durbar Square, Bagmati Province, Nepal

=== Inside Kathmandu valley ===
- Akash Bhairava (Sava Bhakku Deva or Wanga Dya), Halchowk, Kathmandu
- Akash Bhirava (Aaju:) of Indrachok, Kathmandu
- Kanti Bhairav, Gokarneshwor, Kathmandu
- Anand Bhairav, Gyaneshwar, Kathmandu
- Bagh Bhairava, Kirtipur, Kathmandu
- Chunni Bhairav, Bhandarkhal jungle, Kathmandu
- Kaal Bhairava, Kathmandu Durbar Square, Kathmandu
- Kirtimukha Bhairava (inside the Pashupatinath Temple, Kathmandu
- Pachali Bhairav, Teku, Kathmandu
- Mahangkal Bhairav, Tudikhel, Kathmandu
- Shanta Bhairava (Majipa Lakhey Dya), Majipat, Kathmandu
- Swet Bhairava (Haatha:) of Hanumandhoka, Kathmandu
- Unmukta Bhairava (inside the Pashupatinath Temple), Kathmandu
- Batuk Bhairava temple, Lagankhel, Lalitpur
- Hayagriva Bhairava, Bungamati, Lalitpur
- Tika Bhairav, Lele, Lalitpur
- Bhairavnath temple, Taumadhi, Bhaktapur

=== Outside Kathmandu valley ===
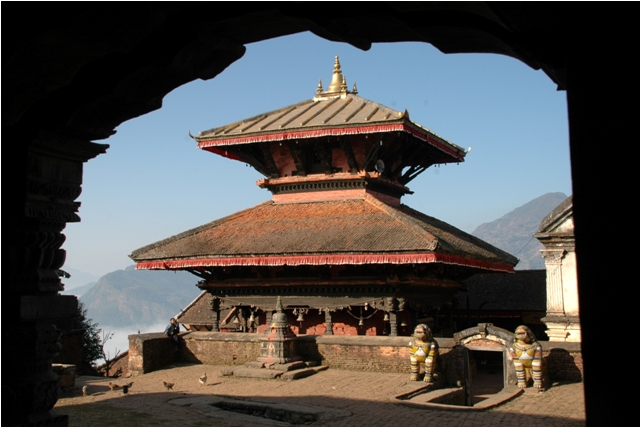
Bhairabi Temple, Nuwakot district

- Kaal Bhairav Bhairabsthan Mandir, Balewa, Baglung District, Gandaki Province
- Bhairabi Temple, Nuwakot, Bagmati province
- Bhairabsthan Temple, Palpa district, Lumbini province
- Kaal Bhairav Temple, Lamkichuha, Kailali district, Sudurpashchim Province
- Unmatta Bhairav, Panauti, Kavrepalanchok District, Bagmati Province
- Swet Bhairava, shreekhandpur, Dhulikhel , Kavrepalanchok District, Bagmati Province
- Masaan Bhairava, Chandeswori, Banepa, Bagmati Province
- Korkhil Bhairava, Dhulikhel, Kavrepalanchok, Bagmati Province
