= Ajaikapada Bhairava Temple =

Coordinates: 20.164723°N 86.223056°E

Religion
- Affiliation: Hinduism
- District: Jagatsinghpur district
- Deity: Lord (Shiva)

Location
- Location: Jagatsinghpur district
- State: Odisha
- Country: India
- Interactive map of Ajaikapada Bhairava Temple

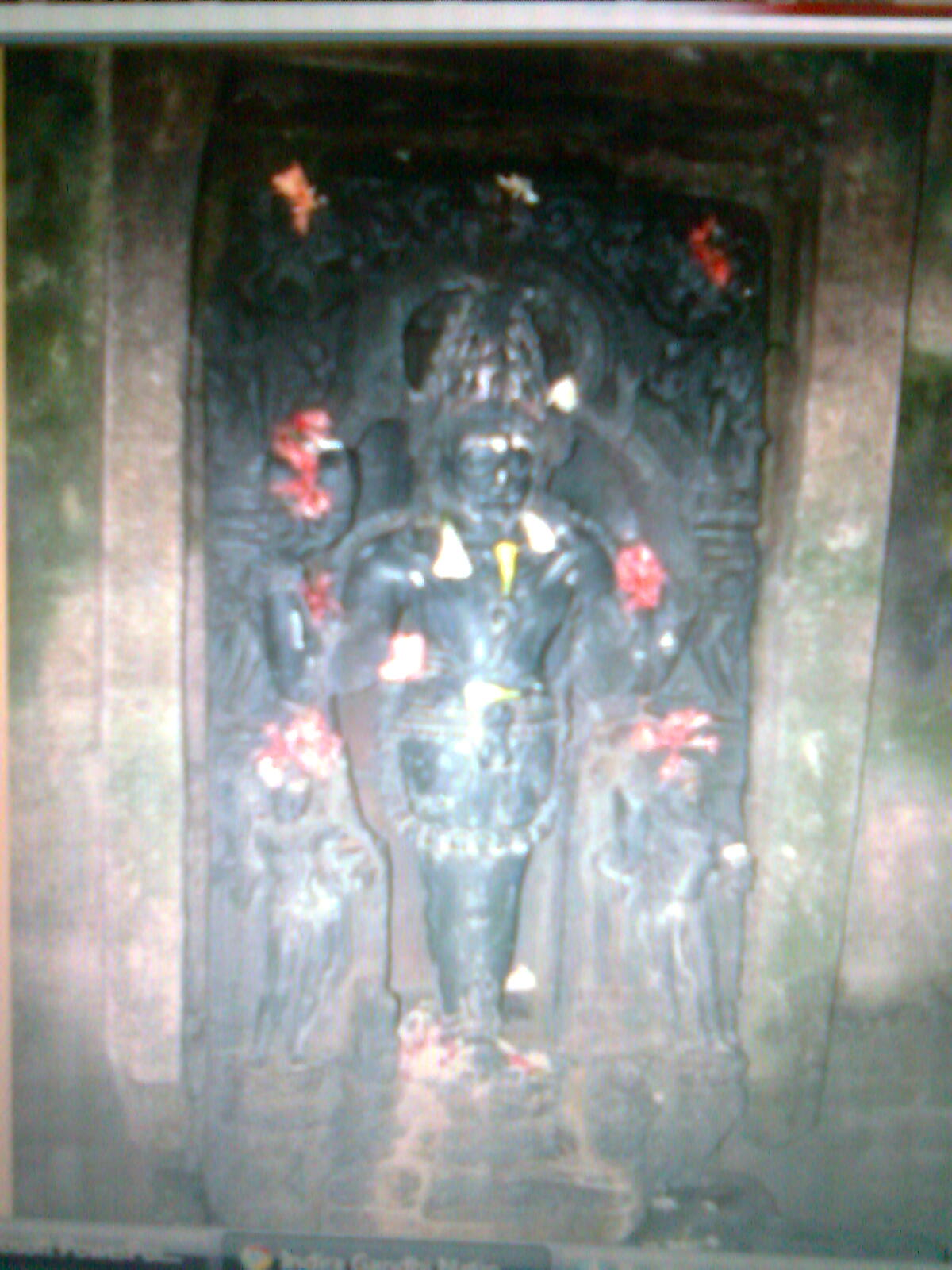
Ajaikapada icon in the sanctum

Ajaikapada Bhairava Temple is a temple dedicated to Ekapada Bhairava – an aspect of Shiva – present in Jagatsinghpur district of Odisha, India.

== Historical evidence ==
The archaeological survey has established that the temple was built during the early 10th century by the Somavamsi Keshari Kings of Orissa. Later, it was destroyed due to flood and attacks by Muslim invaders. The present temple was rebuilt during the 20th century.

== Architecture ==
The current temple is a small Pidha deula reconstructed during the early 20th century, but the Garbhagriha houses the image of Bhairava and a Shivalinga. The Bhairava has one feet and four hands, of which the lower two are broken. The upper two hold disc-shaped structures. The Ajaikapada Bhairava is the ruling deity of the star Pūrva Bhādrapadā.

== Location ==
The temple is located 6 km from Alanahat, Sathalapada, in Jagatsinghpur, near River Alaka (a branch of Mahanadi). Direct transport is available from Nuagaon, too.

== See also ==
- Vaital Deula
