= Bhairavesvarar Temple, Cholapuram =

Shiva temple in Tamil Nadu, India

Coordinates: 11.05510°N 79.41285°E

Bhairavesvarar Temple is a Hindu temple dedicated to the deity Shiva, located at Cholapuram in Thanjavur district, Tamil Nadu, India.

== Location ==
This temple is located at a distance of 13 kilometres (8.1 mi). in Kumbakonam-Chennai highway, in Cholapuram. This place was known as Bhairavapuram.

== Structure ==
This temple belonged to Chola dynasty. Without any structure in the entrance, it has only the base of the front mandapa. On either side of the garbhagriha, Vinayaka are found. Near to him Subramania is found. The goddess is facing south.

== Presiding deity ==
The presiding deity is known as Bhairavesvarar and the goddess is known as Bhairavesvari. This is the place where Bairava appeared in the form of Shiva. So, the presiding deity, who is in the Lingam form is known as Bhairavesvarar. It is said that 64 Bharaivas have appeared in this place and the first Bhairava also came from this place. In the shrine of the goddess, only the face of the deity is found. In this temple eight hand Bhairava is found. Here 64 peetas are found. It is believed that 64 Bhairavas, worshipped and did pujas and dhyāna in these 64 peetas.

== Other deities ==
In this temple Ardhanarishvara, Durga with eight hands, Dakshinamurti, Gangadharar and Kalyanasundara are also found.

== Worship ==
On Saturdays special pujas are held here.
