= Baitala Deula =

Hindu temple of goddess Chamunda in Bhubaneswar, India

Baitala deuḷa
- ବଇତାଳ ଦେଉଳ
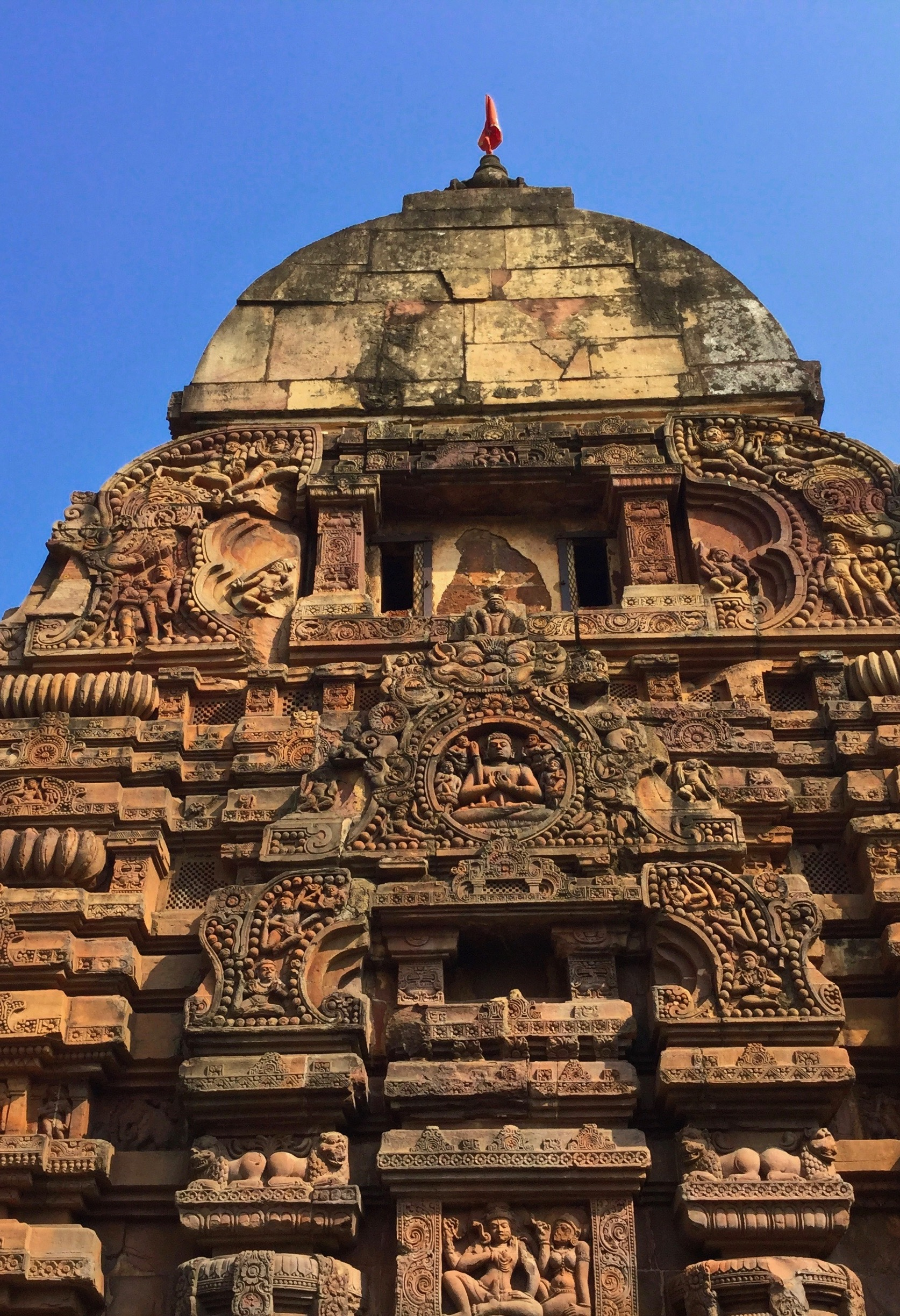
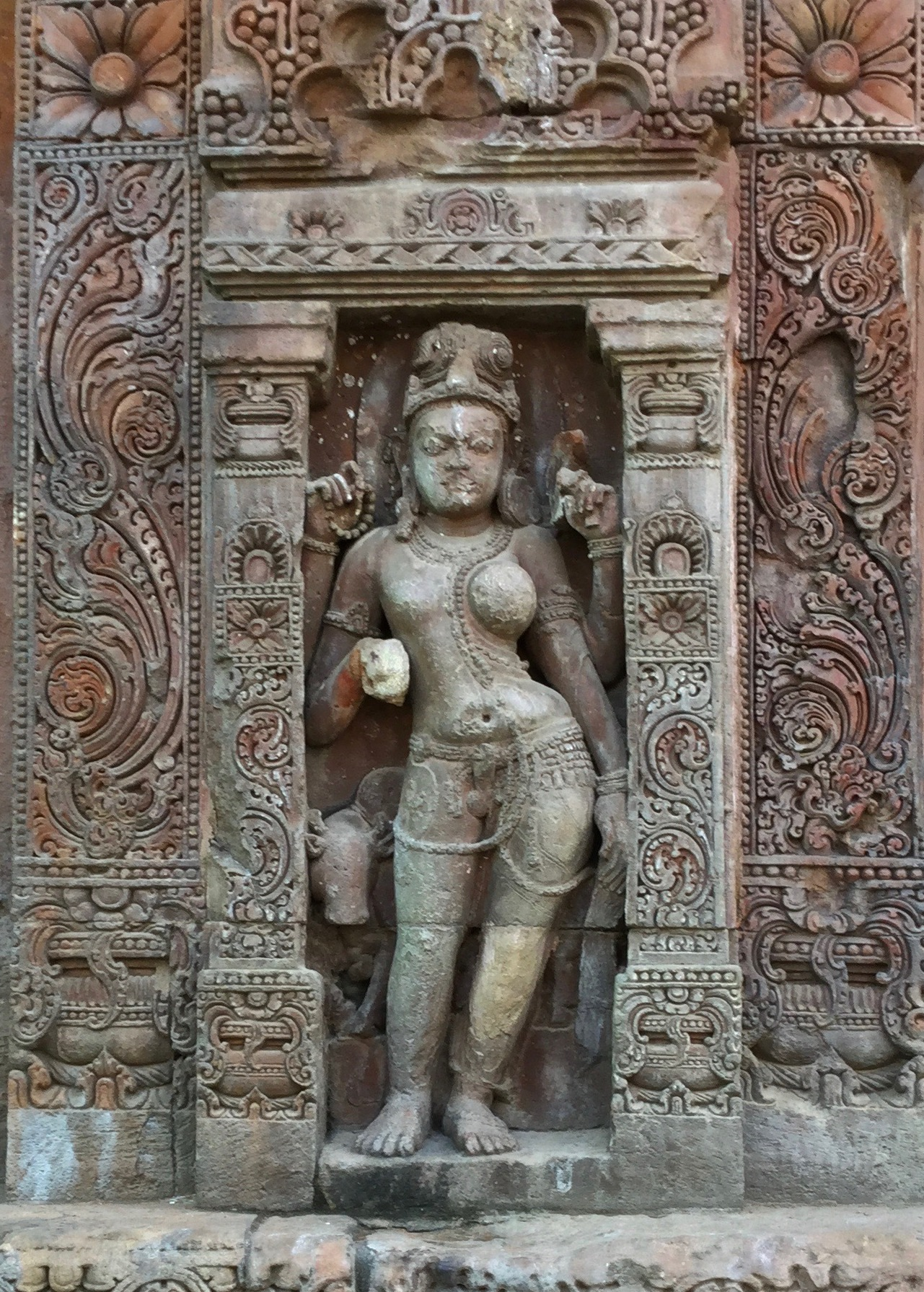
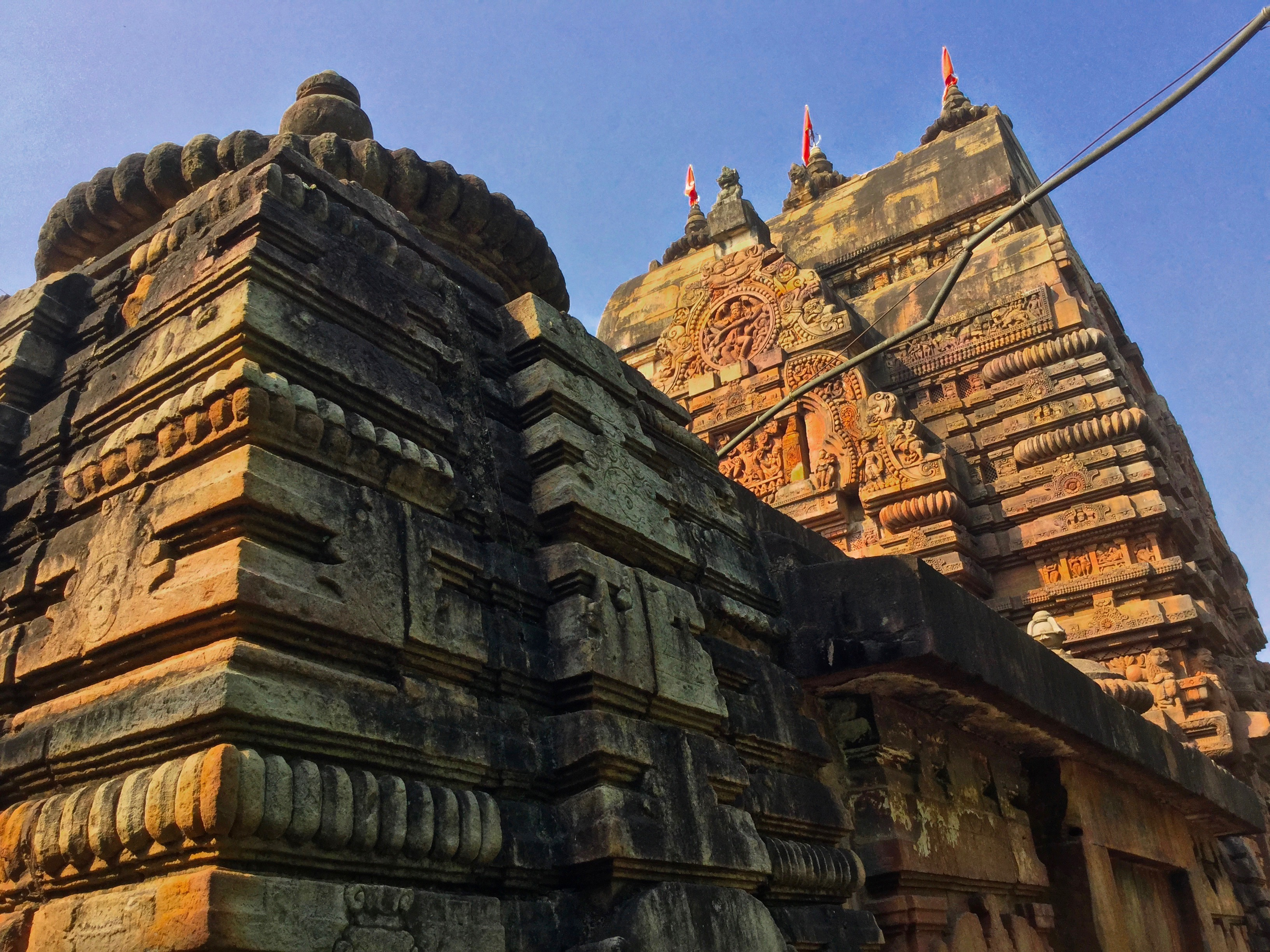
- Clockwise from top left : Side view of main deula, Ardhanarishwara image, View of deula and jagamohana with three towers & flags visible which give it the name tinimundia deula

- Location in Odisha

Religion
- Affiliation: Hinduism
- District: Khurda
- Deity: Chamunda (Kapalini)

Location
- Location: Bhubaneswar
- State: Odisha
- Country: India
- Interactive map of Baitala deuḷa
- Coordinates: 20°16′N 85°15′E

Architecture
- Type: Kalinga architecture

Baitāḷa deuḷa or Vaitāḷa deuḷa (Odia: ବଇତାଳ ଦେଉଳ) is an 8th-century Hindu temple of the typical Khakara style of the Kalinga architecture dedicated to Goddess Chamunda located in Bhubaneswar, the capital city of Odisha, India. It is also locally known as Tini-munḍiā deuḷå (Odia - ତିନି ମୁଣ୍ଡିଆ ଦେଉଳ) due to the three spires on top of it, a very distinct and unusual feature. The three spires are believed to represent the three powers of the goddess Chamunda - Mahasaraswati, Mahalakshmi and Mahakali.

== Architecture ==
Baitaḷa Deuḷa Temple’s striking feature is the shape of its sanctuary tower. The semi-cylindrical shape of its roof is a leading example of Khakhara order of temples— which bears an affinity to the Dravidian Gopuram of the South Indian temples. Its gabled towers with a row of Shikharas reveals unmistakable signs of southern intrusion. The plan of the deuḷa is oblong and the jagamohana is a rectangular structure, but embedded in each angle is a small subsidiary shrine. Baitala deuḷa boasts of some figures, although executed in relief, are however characterized by delicacy of features and perfect equipoise.

The outer walls are encrusted with panels of Hindu deities, mostly Shiva and his consort Parvati, hunting processions, capturing of wild elephants and the occasional erotic couples.

The facade of the deuḷa above the left of the jagamohana is dominated by two chaitya windows—the lower one having a carved figure of the sun god, Surya noted for its facial expression, with Usha (Dawn) and Pratyusha shooting arrows on either side and with Aruna in front, driving a chariot of seven horses.

The medallion in the upper Chaitya window houses a 10-armed Nataraja, the dancing form of Shiva. In front of the flat roofed Jagamohana is a stone post relieved with two Buddha like figures seated in Dharma-Chakra-Pravartana mudra.

Another striking feature is temple's Tantric associations, marked by eerie carvings in the sanctum. The image enshrined in the central niche, eight armed Chamunda, locally known as Kapaḷini, is the terrifying form of goddess. Thus, Baitāḷa Deuḷa is a Shakti shrine.

== The Deity ==
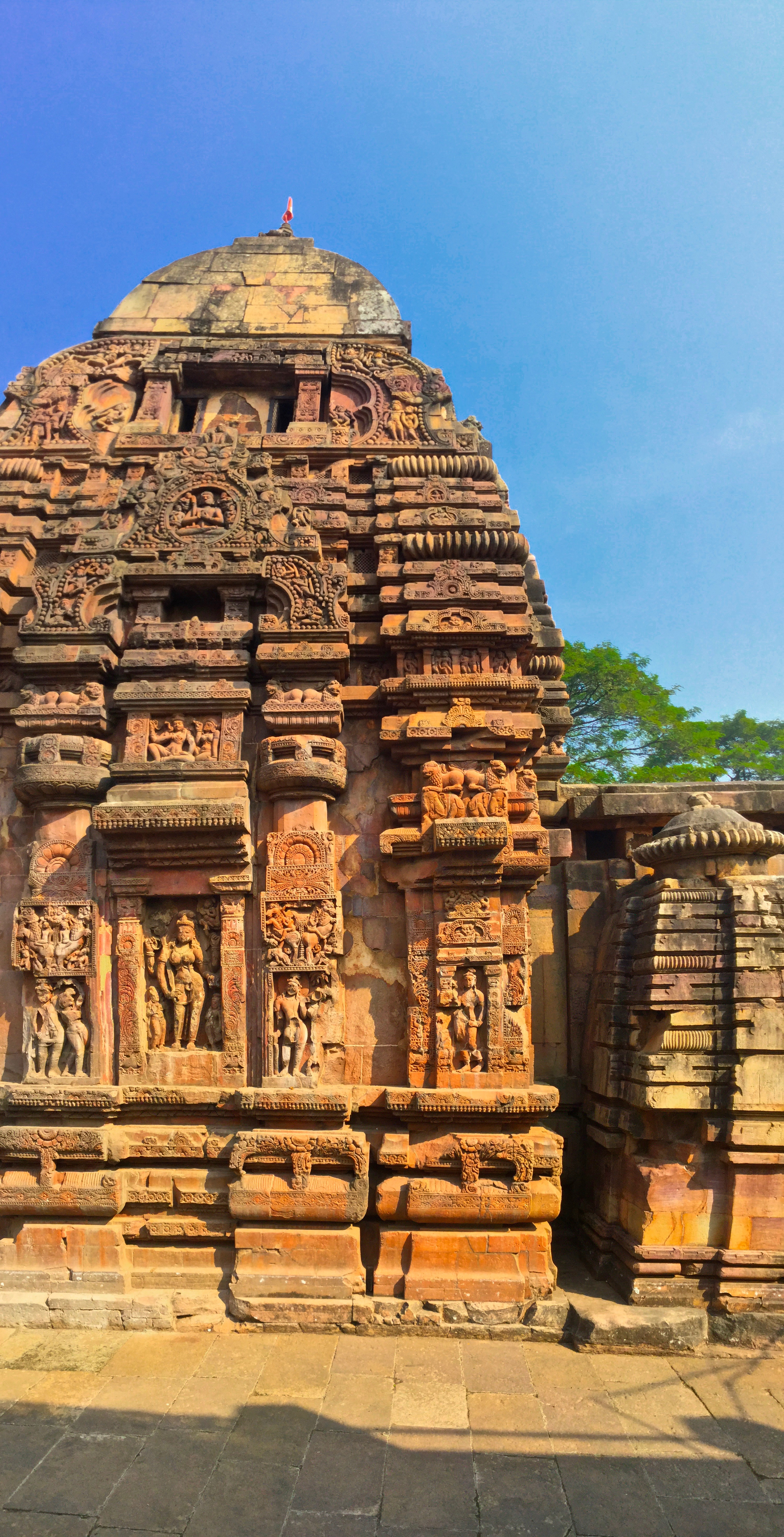
Vertical panorama of the entire temple

The presiding deity, Chamunda or Charchika sits on a corpse flanked by a jackal and an owl and decorated with a garland of skulls. She holds a snake, bow, shield, sword, trident, thunderbolt and an arrow, and is piercing the neck of the demon. The niche is capped by a chaitya window containing seated figures of Shiva and Parvati.

Chamunda is surrounded by a host of other smaller size allied deities carved in the lower parts of the walls, each within a niche separated by a pilaster. The figure on the east wall, to the right of the door, is a skeleton form of Bhairava, the counterpart of Chamunda.

The other, carved on the north wall, rises from ground, having filled his skull-cup with the blood of a person whose severed head lies on the right. On the pedestal is an offering of two more heads on a tray resting on a tripod, flanked by a jackal feasting on the decapitated body on the right and a woman holding a head on the left.

The tantric character of the temple is also marked by the stone post, to which sacrificial offerings were tethered, just in front of the jagamohana. Artificial light is needed to see in the darkness of the interior, though early morning sun lights up the interior.

== Gallery ==
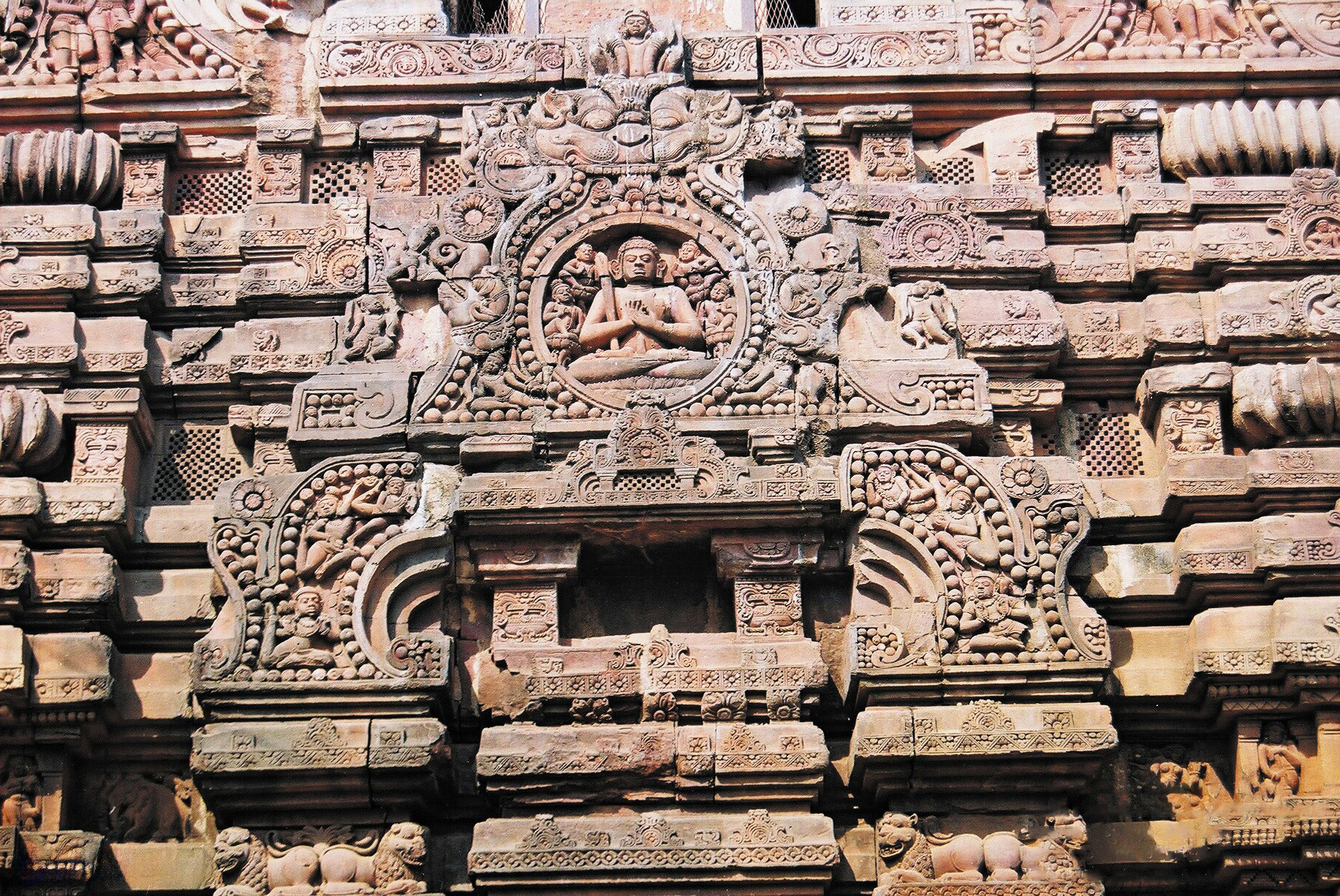

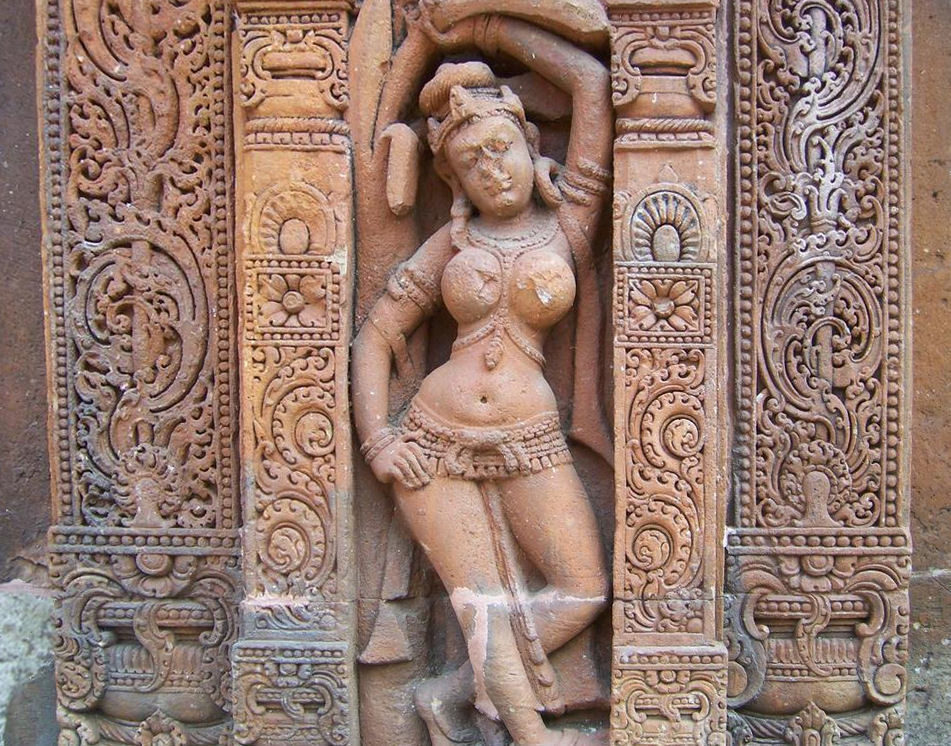
Alasakanya

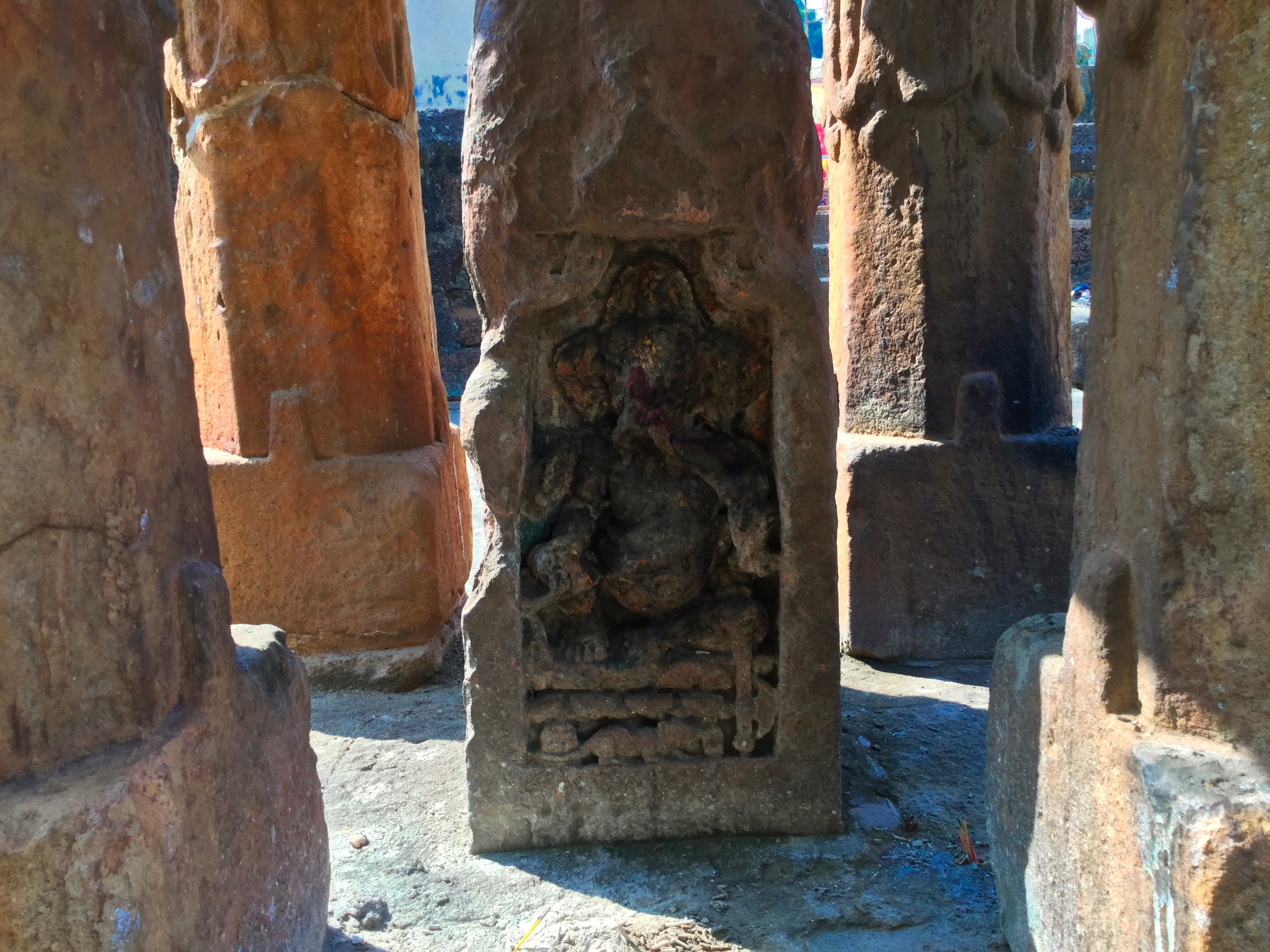
Ganesha

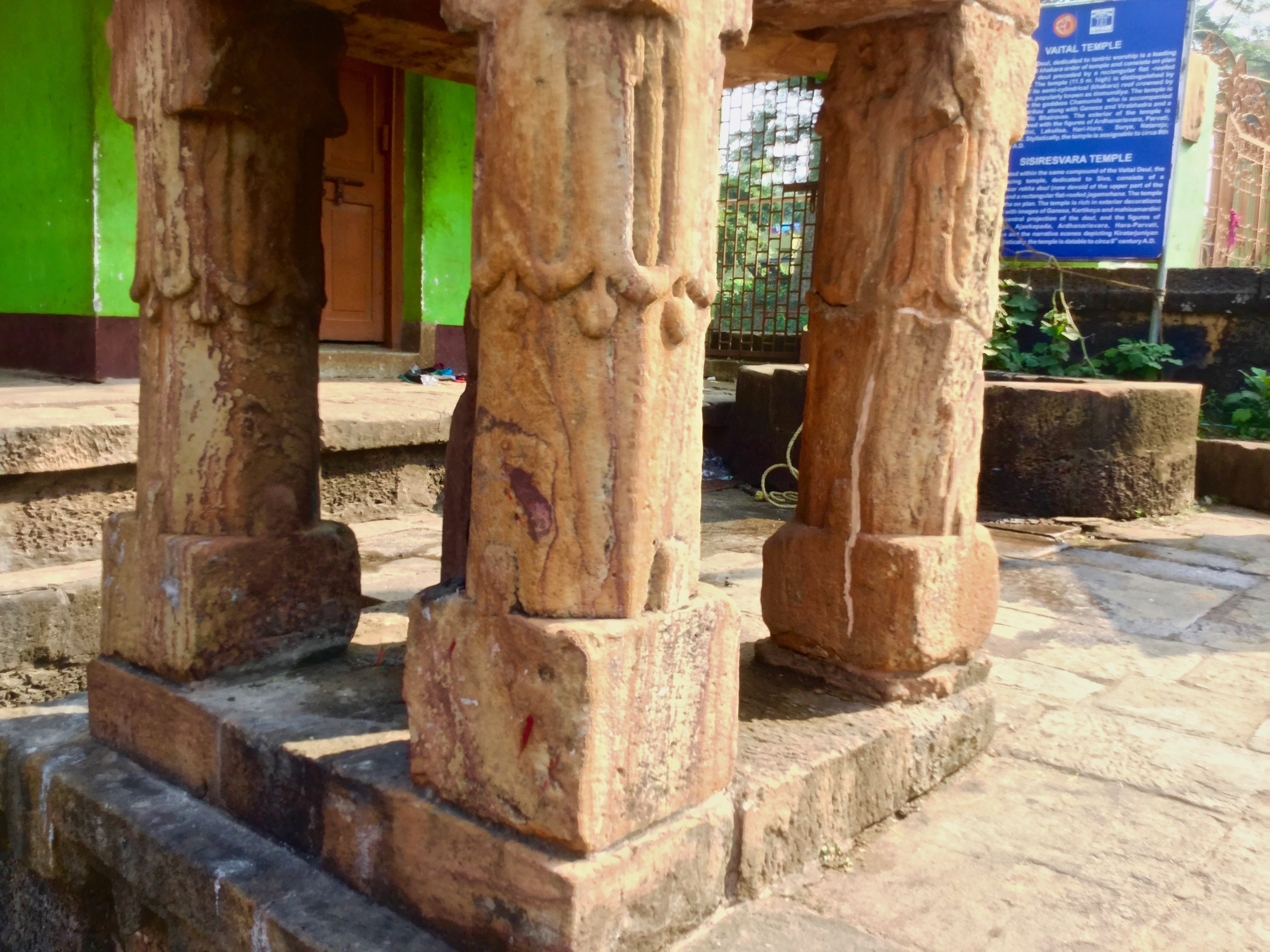

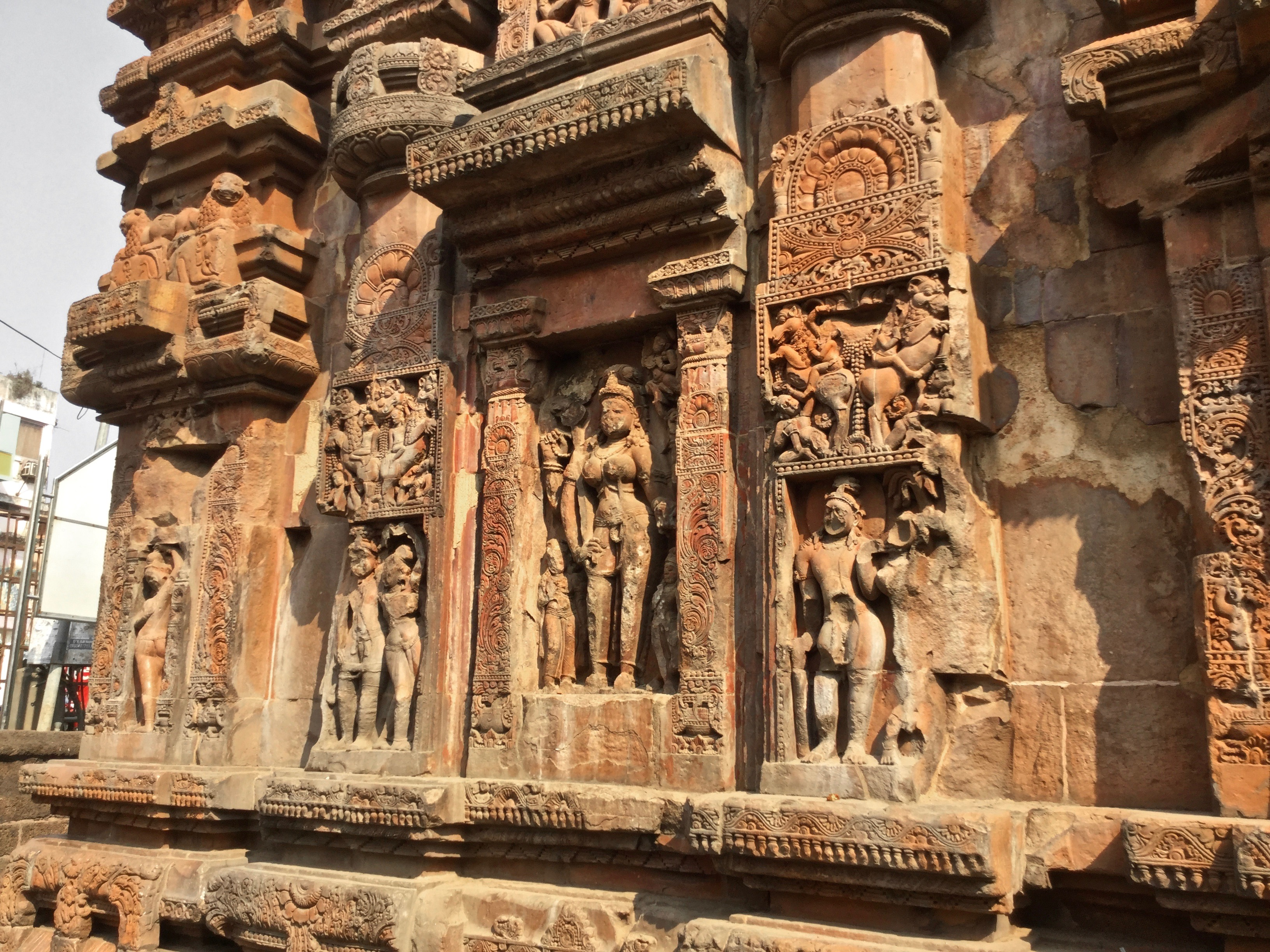

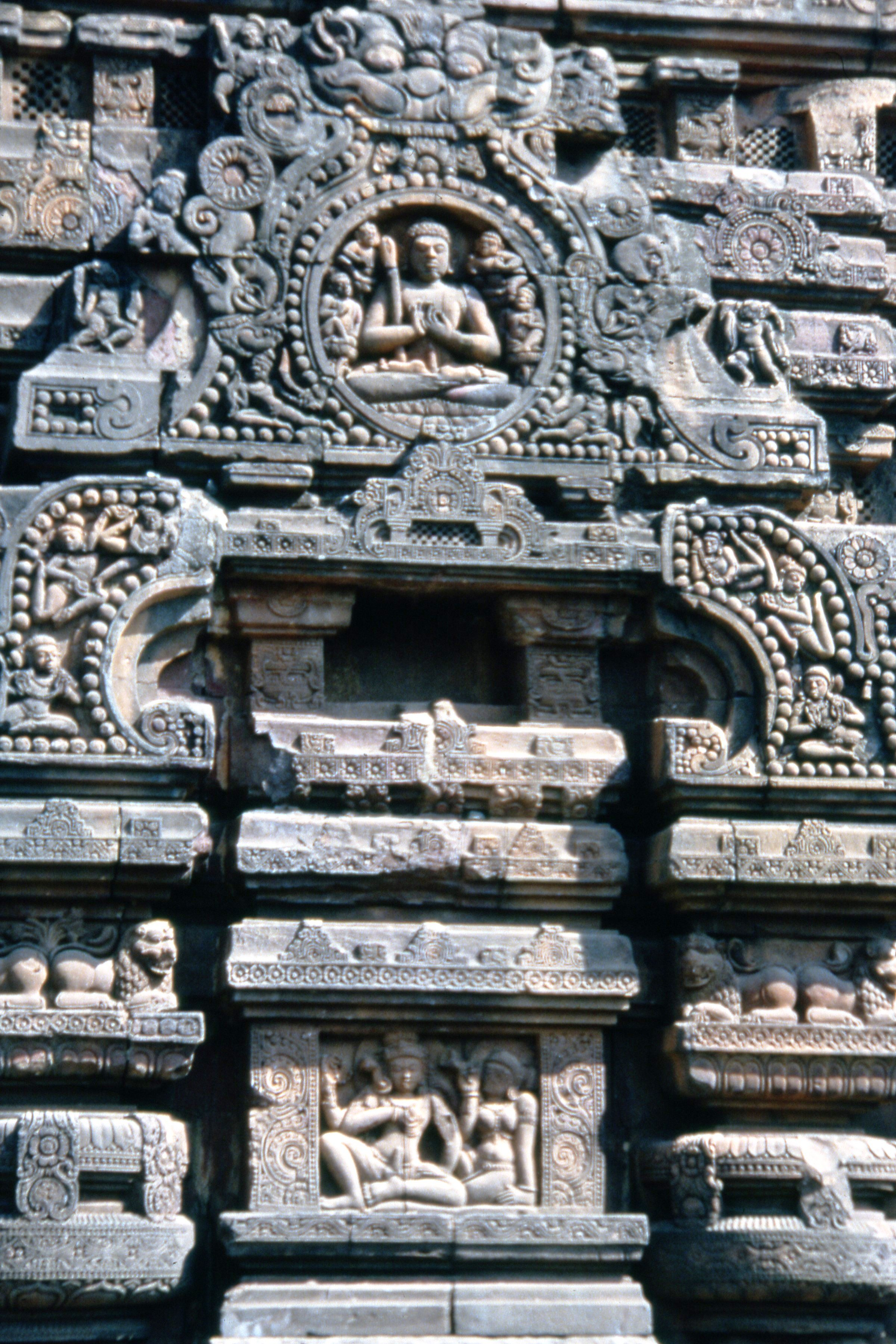
A pediment in one of the sides of the temple depicting Shiva in a sitting position

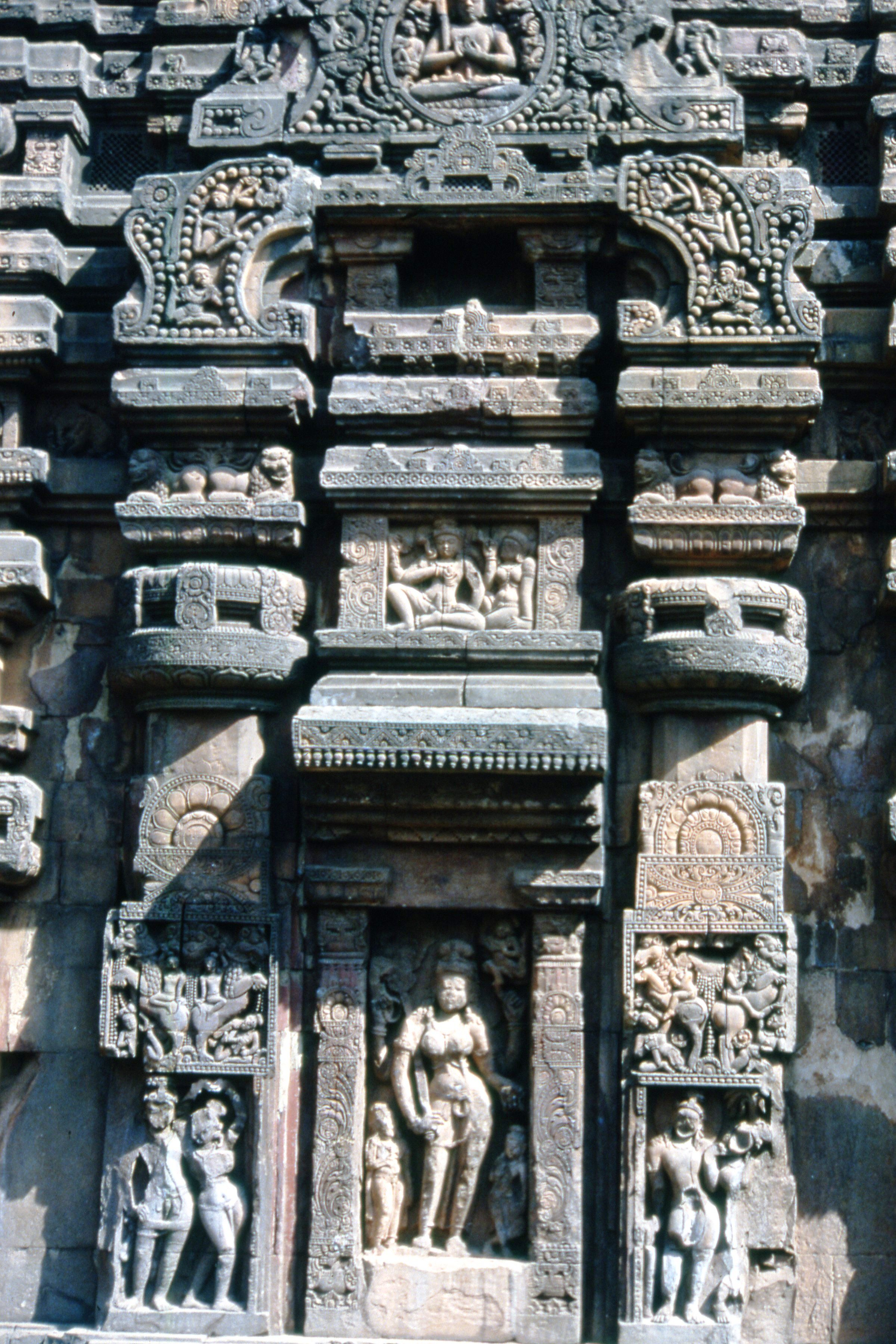
A pediment on top of two columns and a niche.

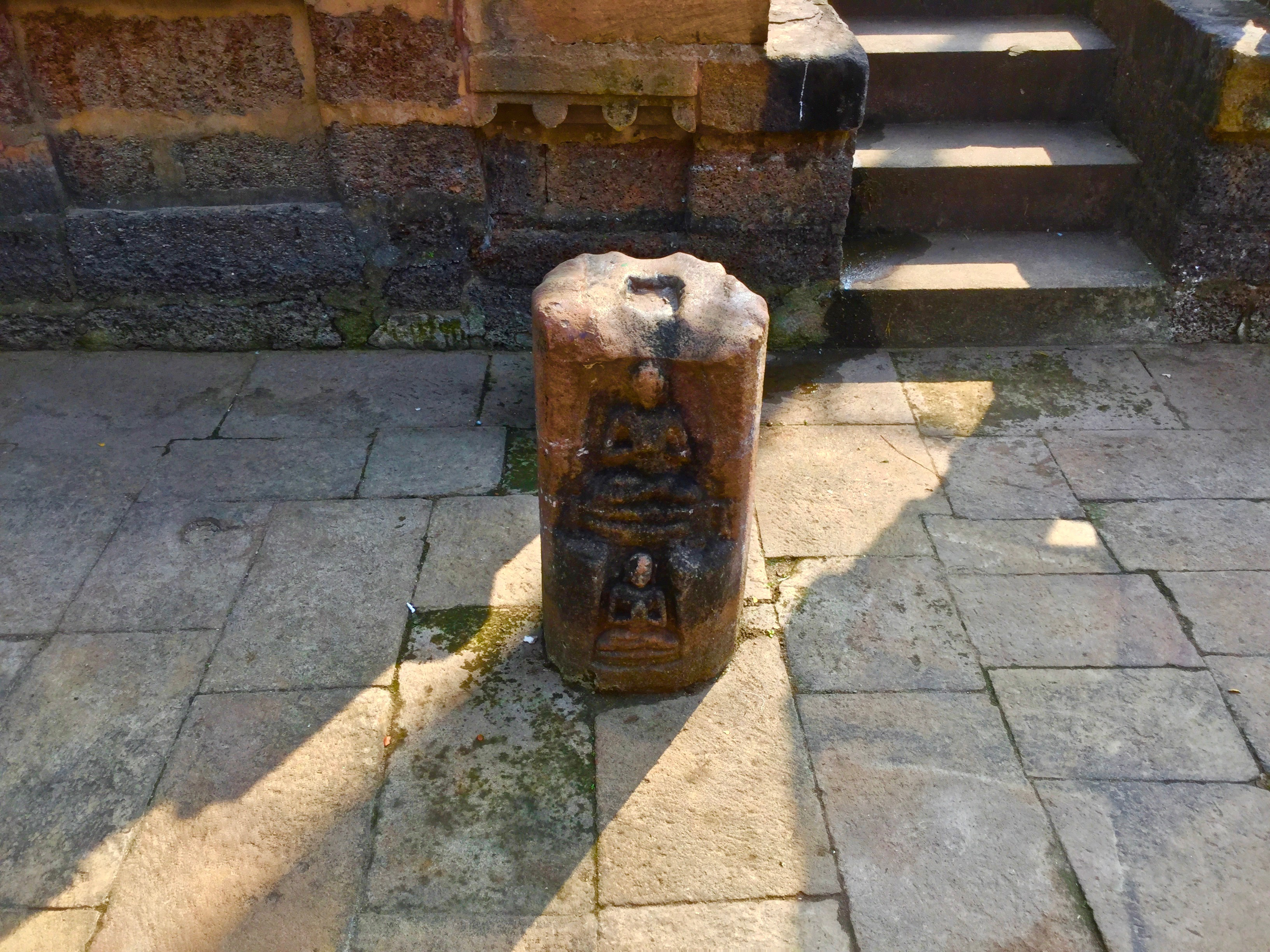
Supposed stone on which sacrifices were made. It is known as a harikāṭha or jupastambha.

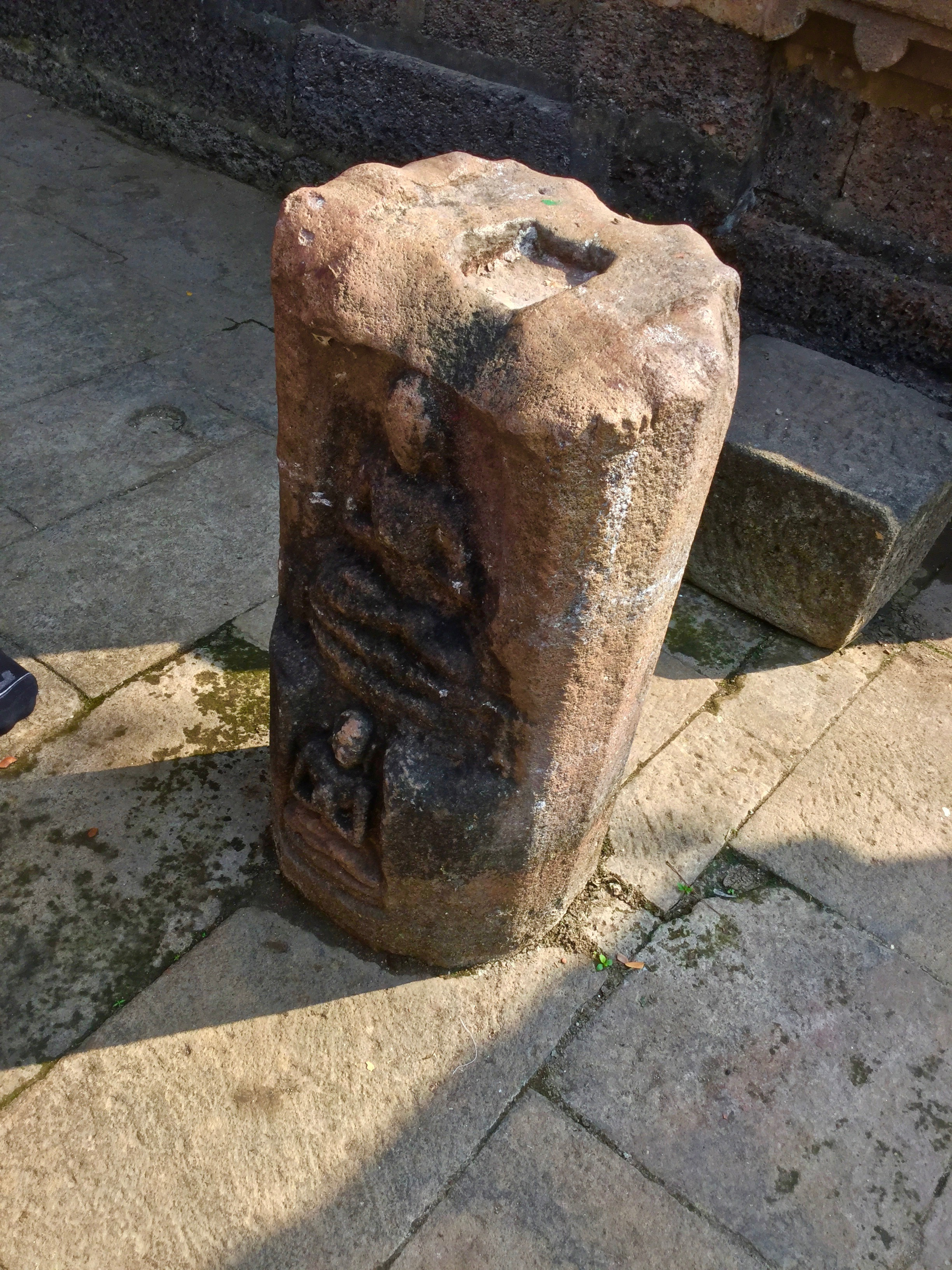
Supposed stone on which sacrifices were made, close-up.

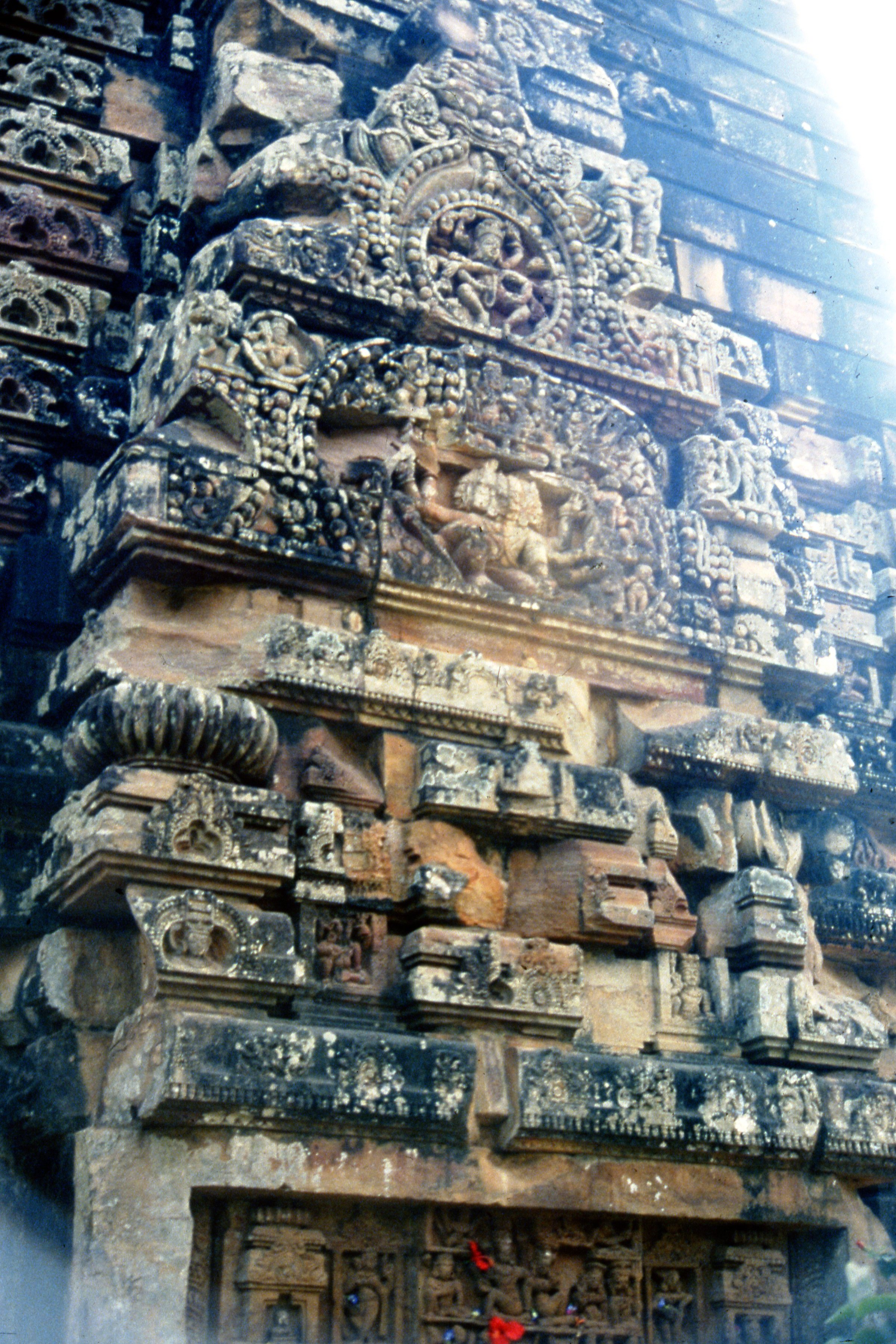
A pediment on one of the sides of the temple.

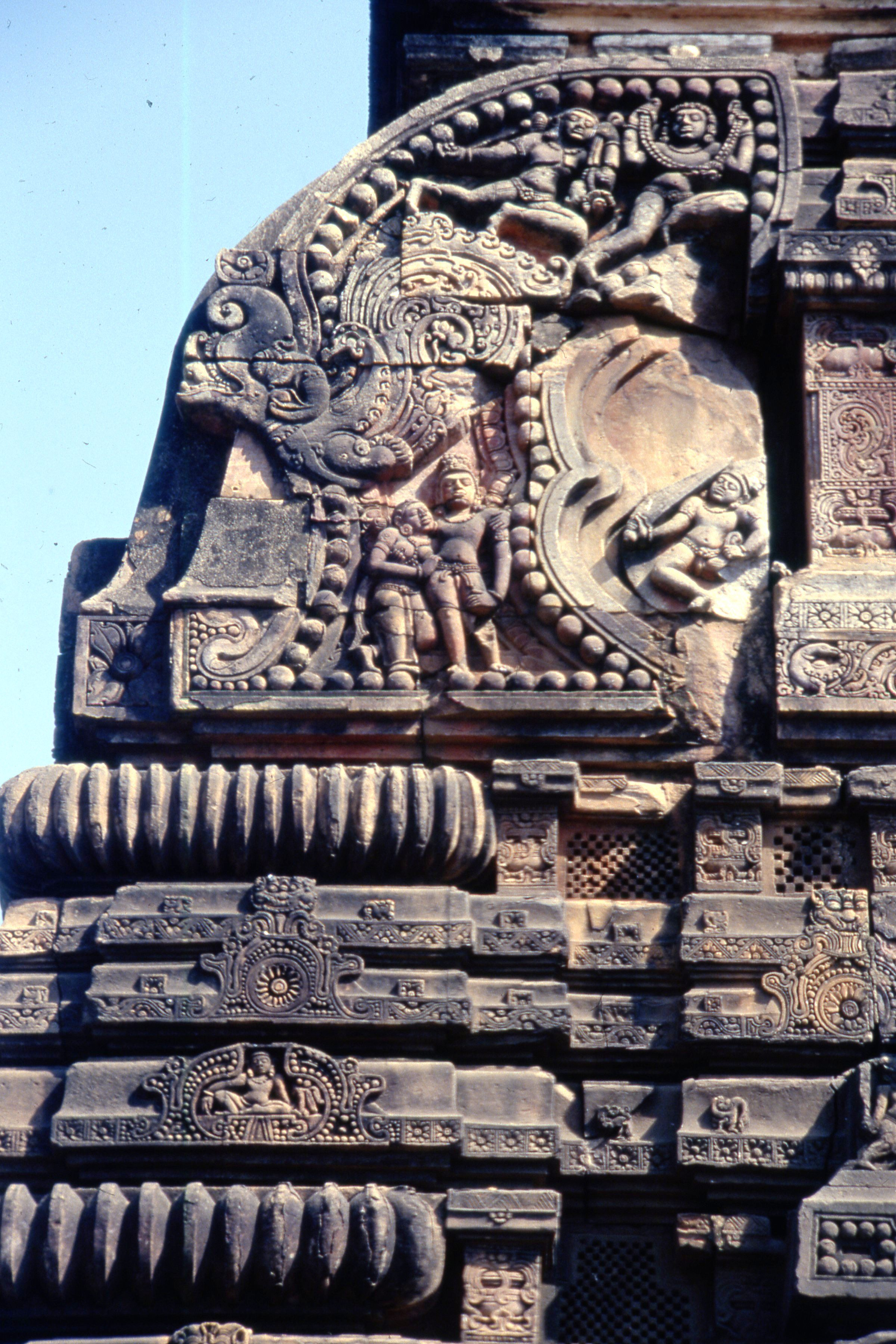
A close up on the central pediment

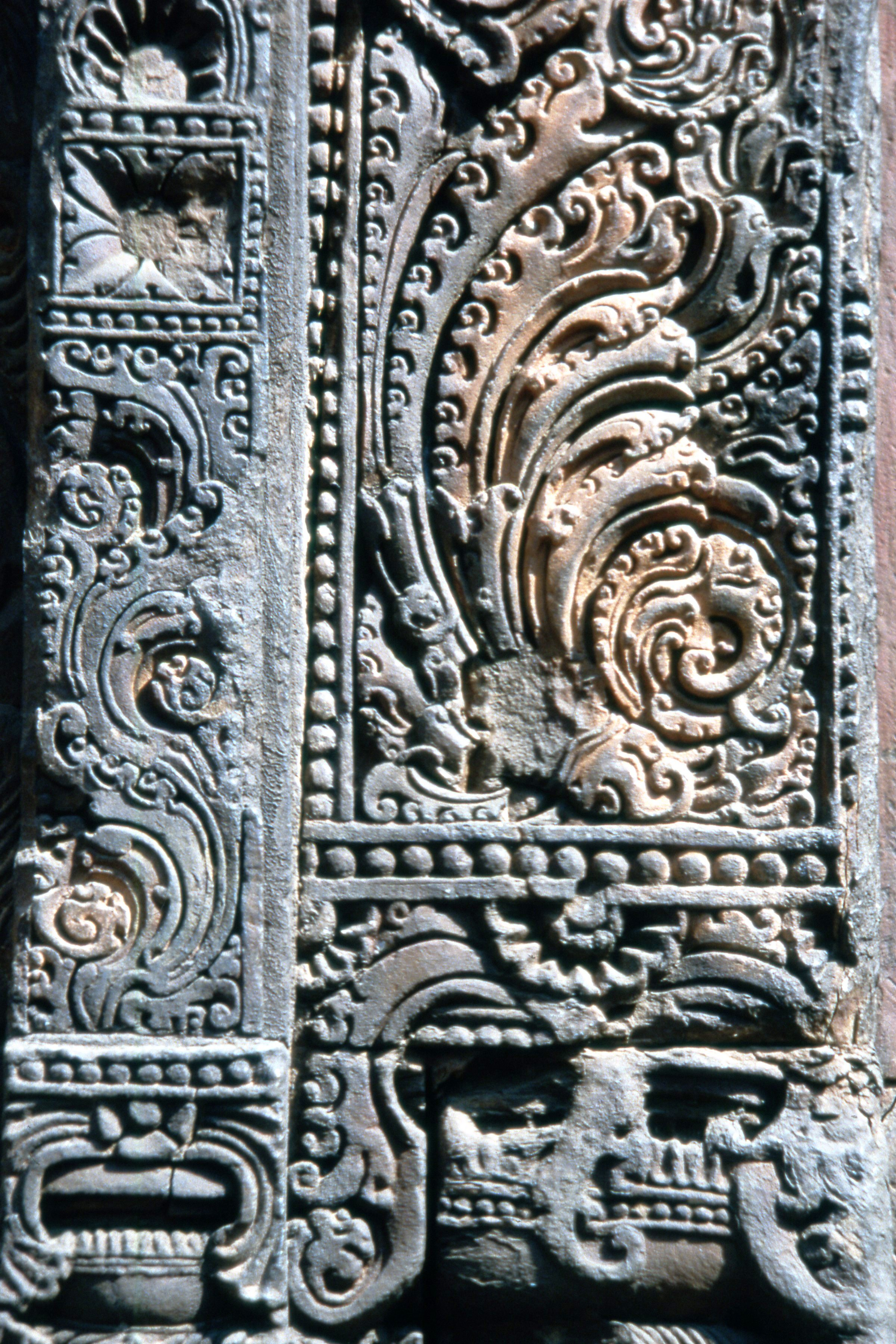
Relief detail on Baitala Deula temple with the symbol of Purna Kalasha surrounded by garlands.

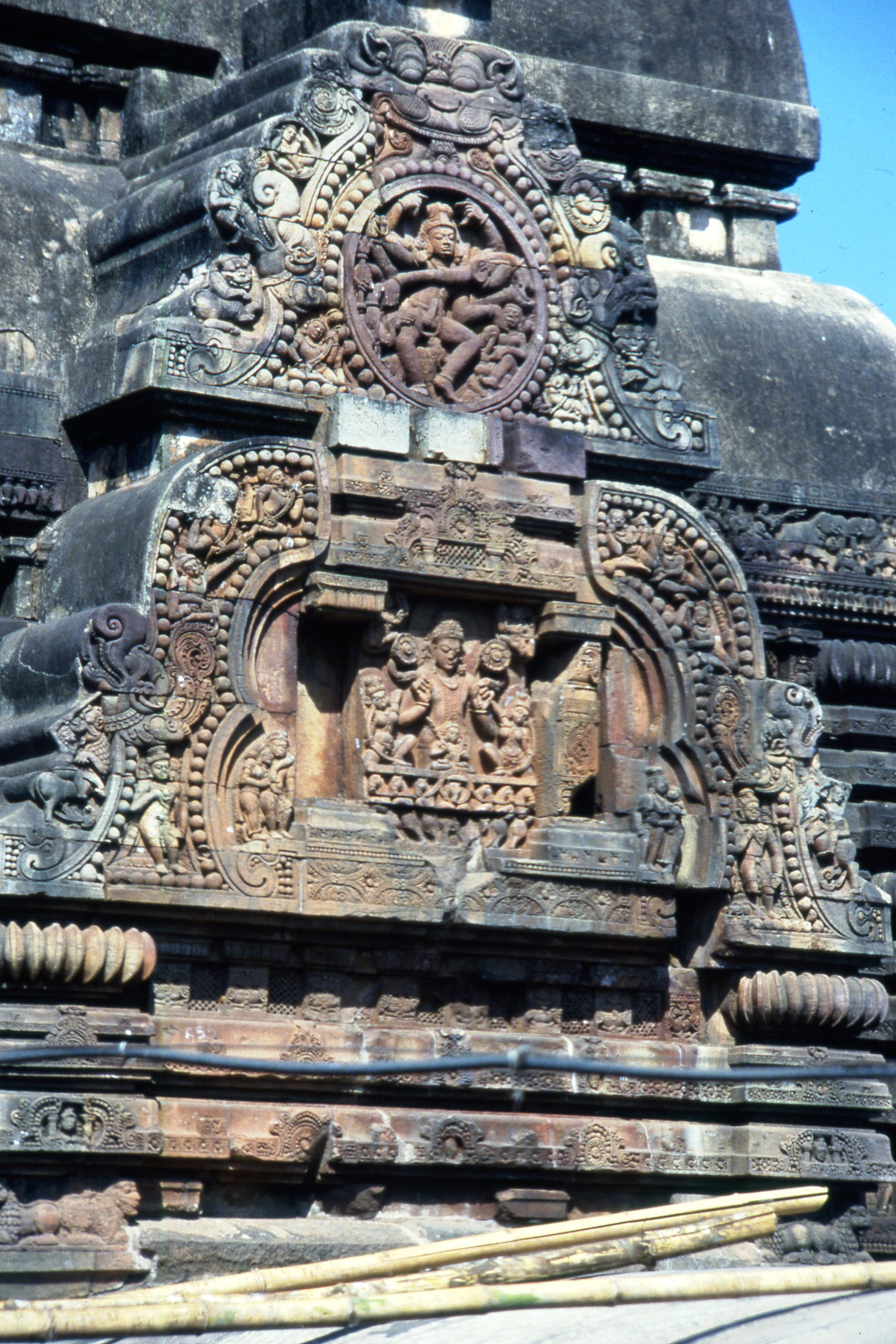
A double pediment depicting a dancing Shiva

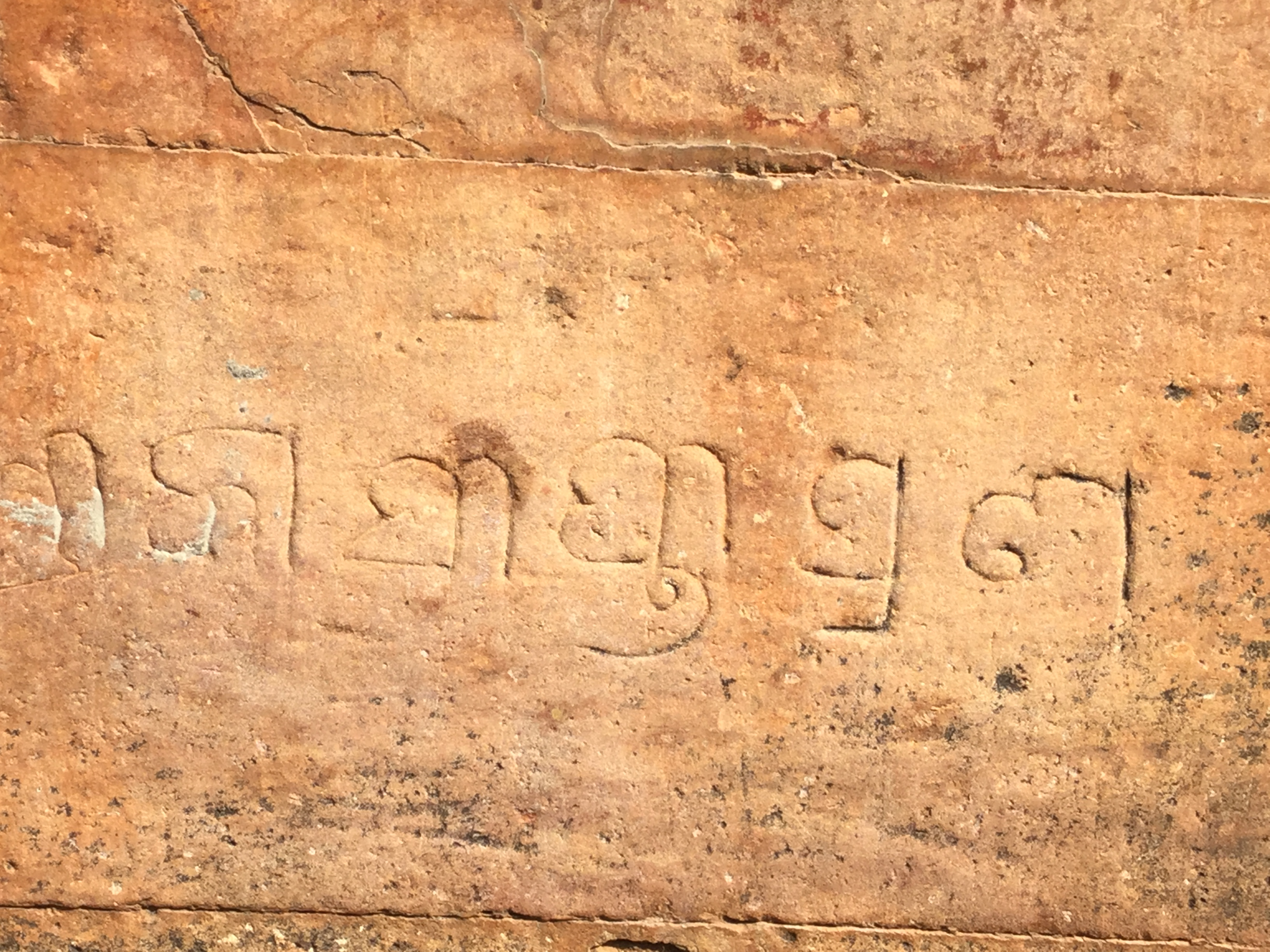
Inscription on outer right wall in Odia script. It reads 'ସ୍ରୀକାସୀପ୍ତୀ ସ୍ରଣ' (transliteration : sri kasīptī sraṇa) in old Odia which means 'I seek shelter at the feet of the Lord of Kashi [=Shiva]'

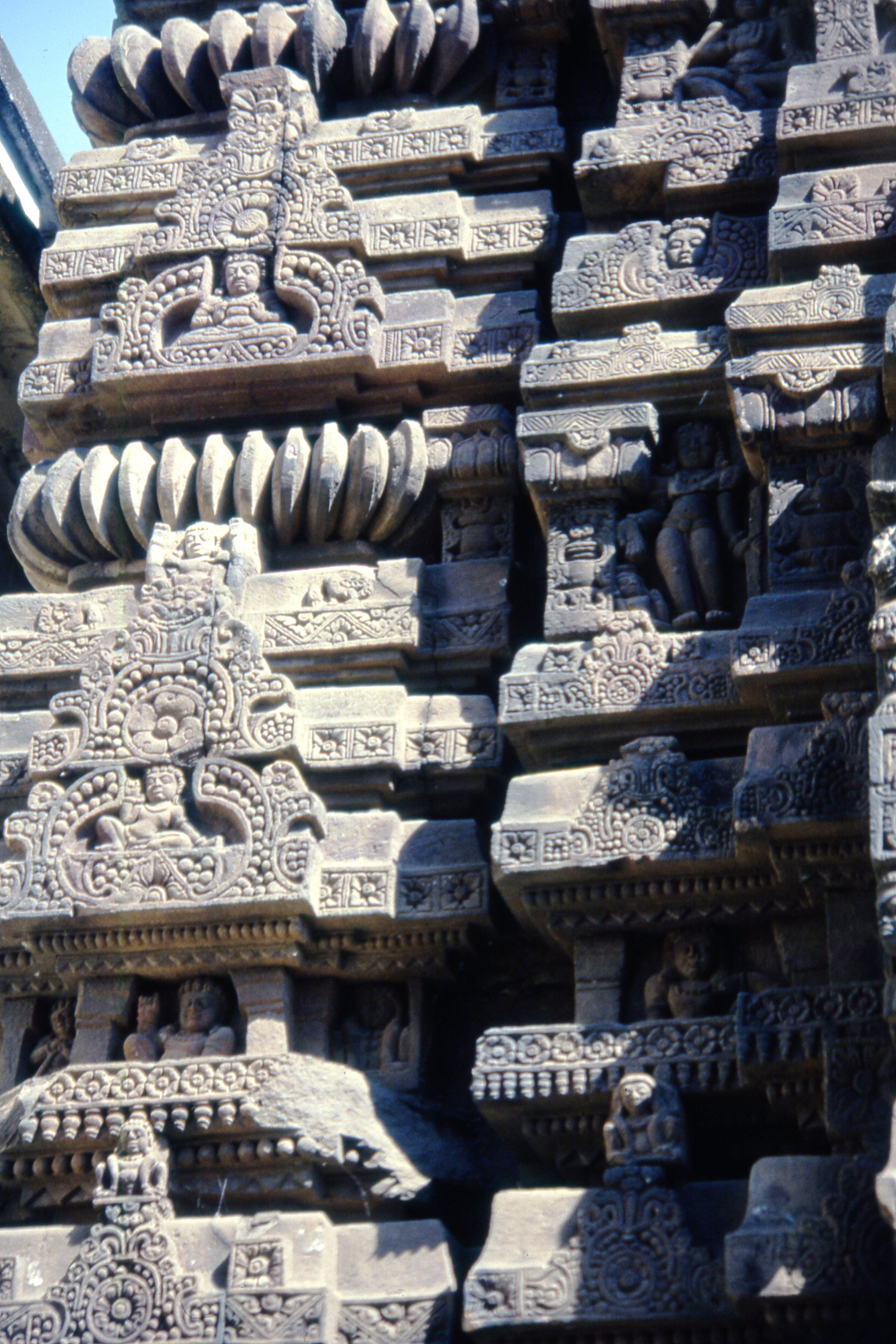
Several pediments at one side of the temple.

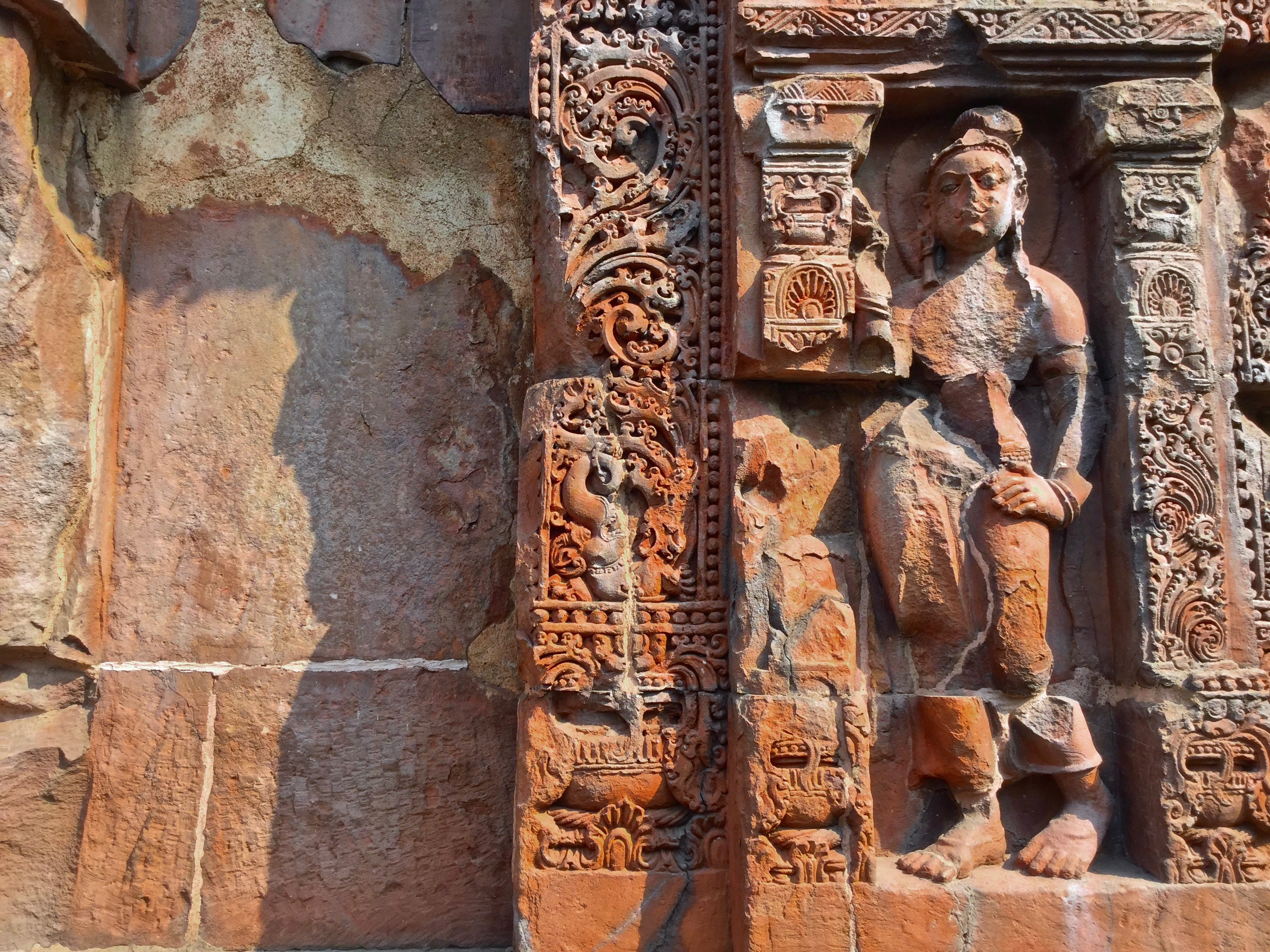

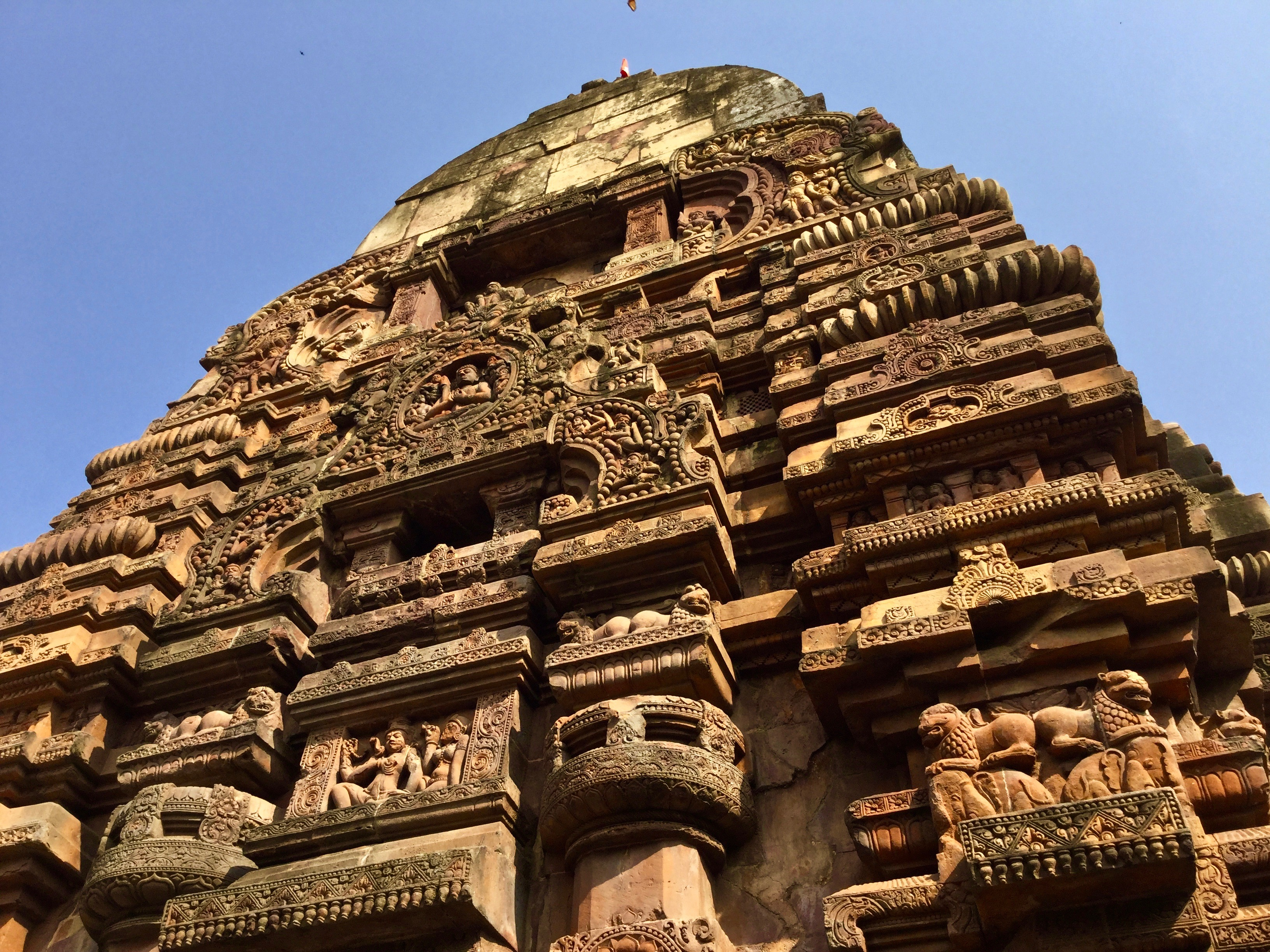

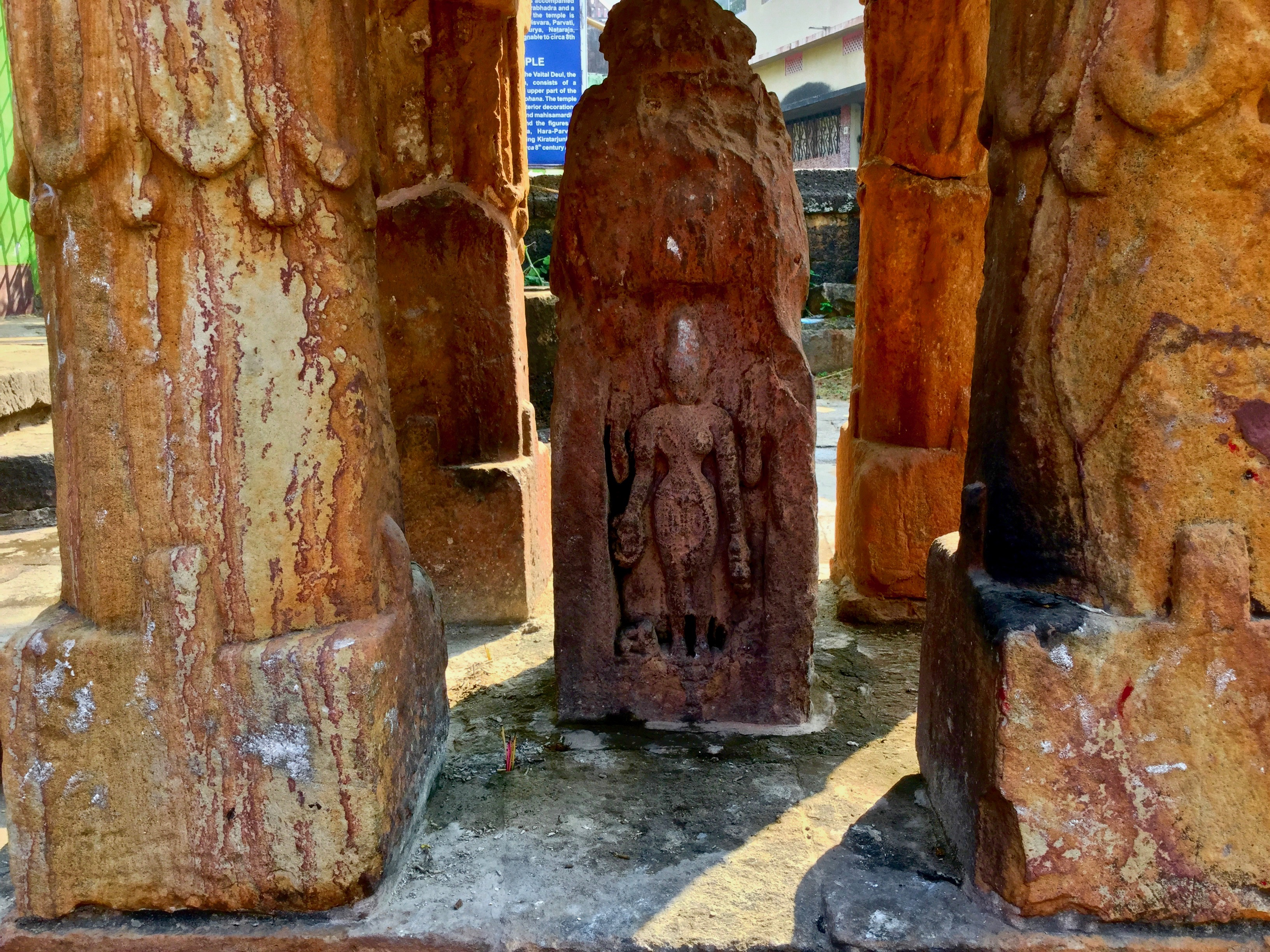
Parvati

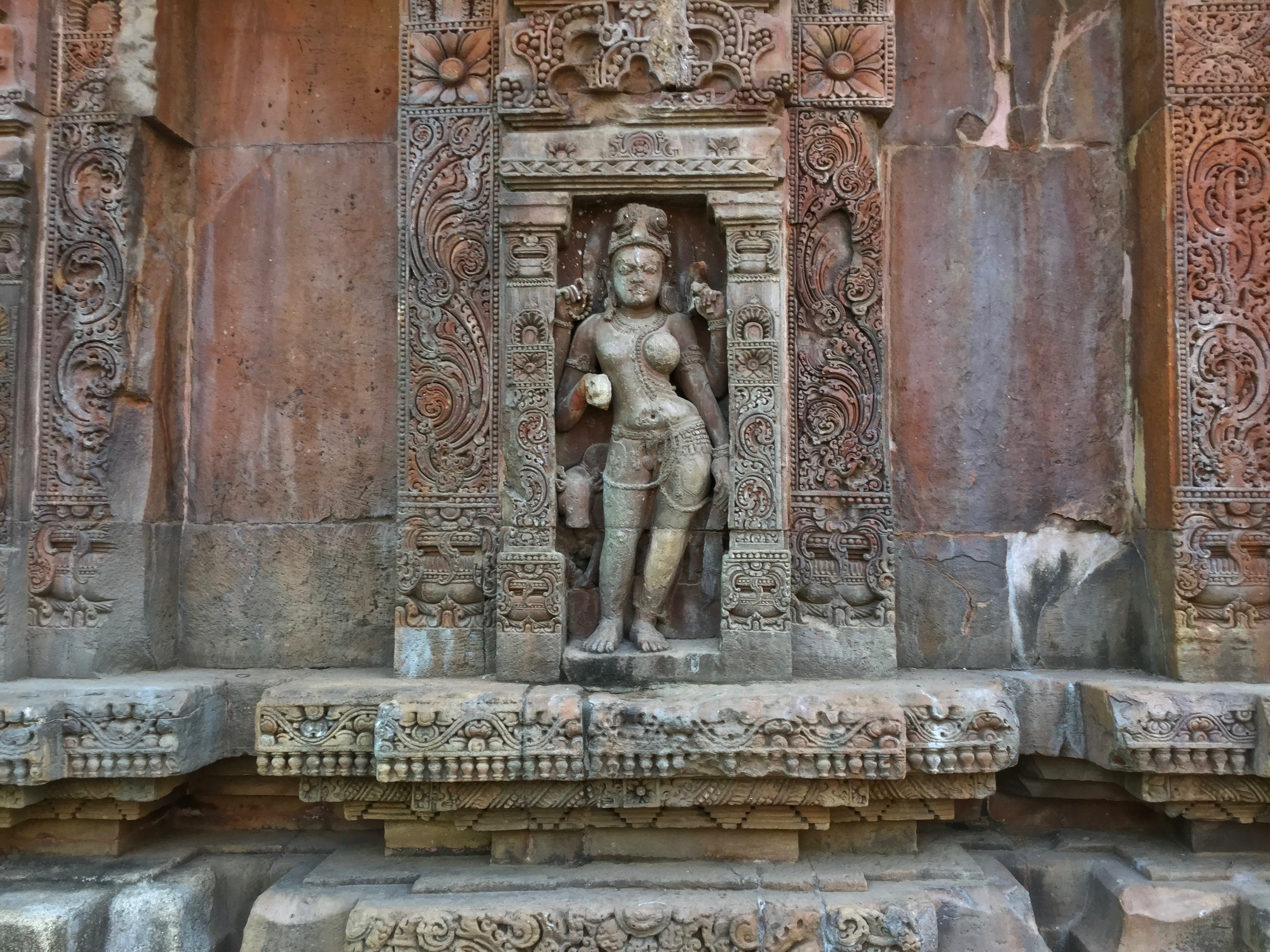
Ardhanarishwara

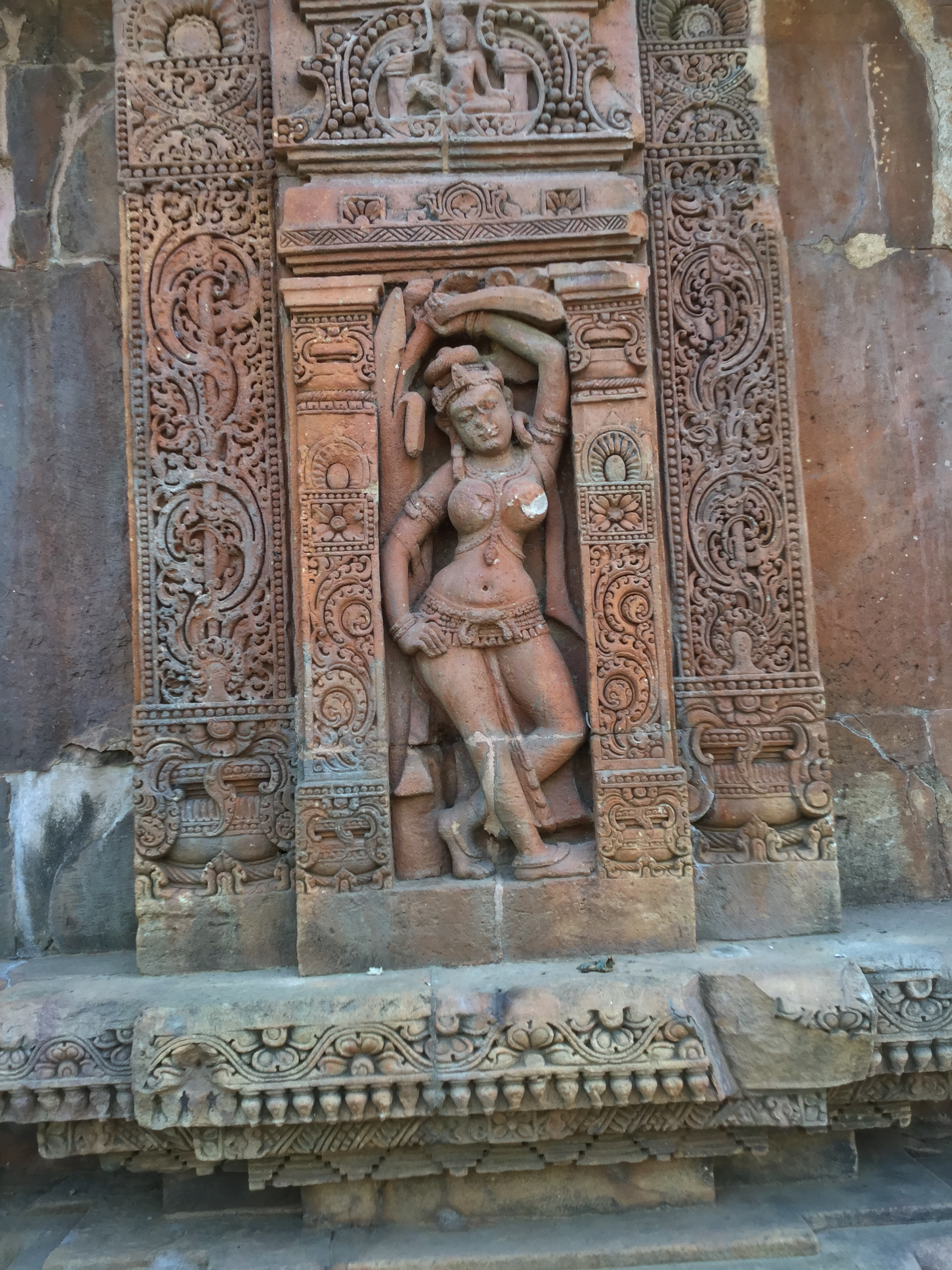
Alasakanya
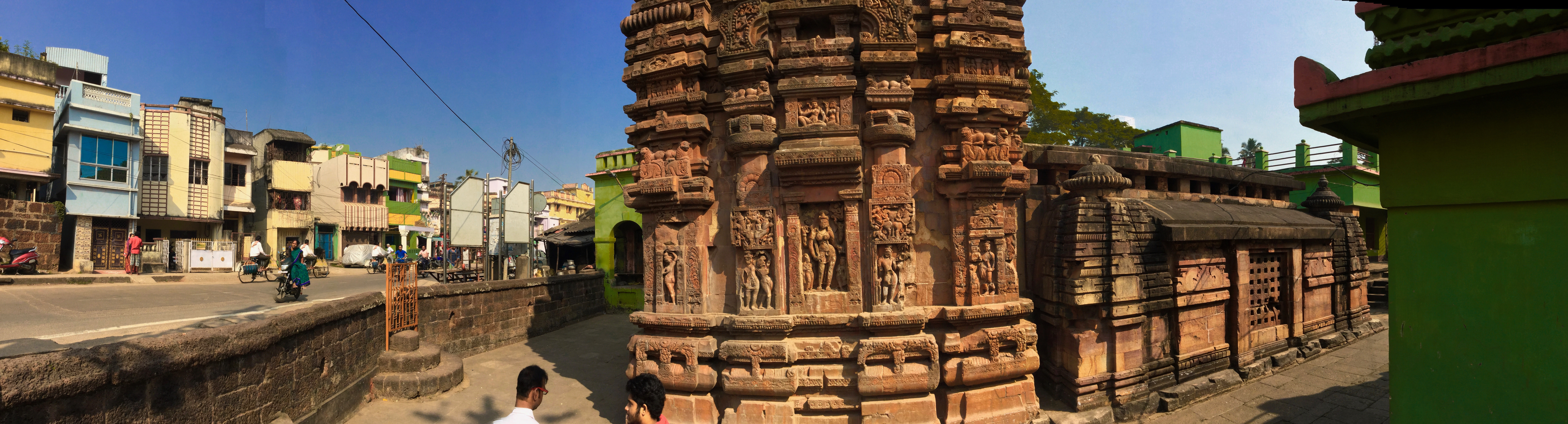
Panorama with street

== See also ==
- Varahi Deula, Chaurasi
- List of temples in Bhubaneswar
