= Kukutesvara Siva Temple =

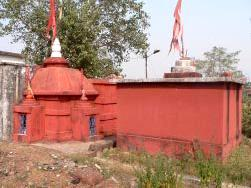

- Location in Orissa

Religion
- Affiliation: Hinduism
- Deity: Shiva

Location
- Location: Bhubaneswar
- State: Orissa
- Country: India
- Coordinates: 21°15′0″N 85°49′30″E

Architecture
- Type: Kalinga Architecture
- Completed: 10th century CE
- Elevation: 22 m (72 ft)

The Kukutesvara Siva Temple or Kukutesvara Temple is a small, 1000-year-old shrine to Shiva located in the "Temple City of India" Bhubaneswar, Orissa.

== History ==
The Kukutesvara Siva temple was constructed during the rule of the Somavamsi dynasty in approximately 975–1000 CE.

Local legends associate the temple with the Kesari dynasty (see East India for context). Located in the Tinimundia chowk which is in the old part of the city, the temple faces eastwards. The principal deity is a Shivalingam resting on a circular yonipitha facing north. The temple continues to be in use and is managed by two priests with events and rituals including Sankranti and abhisheka being observed.

== Construction and statues ==
The main sanctum or vimana of the temple is square, its sides measuring 2.1 metres long; it is 3.8 metres high. The vimana is of old construction while the peripheral jagamohana (entrance hallway) is more recent. The jagamohana is rectangular with sides of 42.6 metres and 26.0 metres. The door to the main sanctum is located on the east and is only 1.16 metres high and 0.5 metres wide. The door lintel includers carvings of the navagrahas, all seated on a lotus. The three other sides of the vimana include parsadevata rahas (niches).

The southern raha houses a four-armed Ganesha holding a japamala (prayer beads) in the upper right arm, a laddu in the upper left arm and a knife in the lower left arm.

The western raha houses Kartikeya (a name of the deity Murugan) who holds his lower right arm in Varada Mudra, a trident and knife in his upper arms and resting his other arm on his mount, a peacock.

The final raha, located in the north, belongs to Shiva's consort Parvati. The deity in this raha, unlike the others, is a more modern addition.

The temple is constructed in typical Kalingan style using fine-grained ochreous sandstone and dry masonry.
