= Buddhanath Temple =

Coordinates: 20.196681°N 85.948491°E

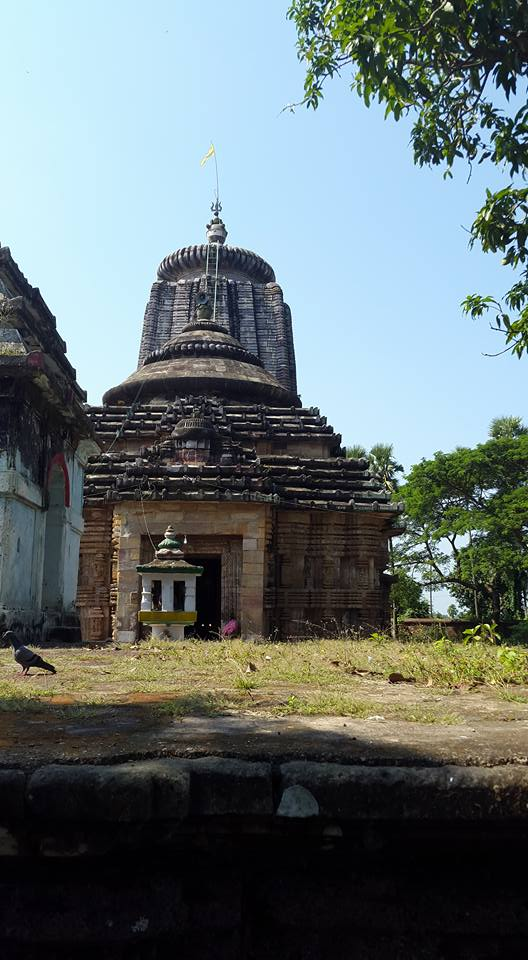
Buddhanath Temple

The 12th-century Buddhanath Temple is a Hindu temple dedicated to the god Shiva. The temple is in the village of Garedi Panchana in the block of Balipatna about 22 km (14 mi) away from the city of Bhubaneswar, India. The temple is said to have been built by the king Chodaganga Dev of the Somavanshi dynasty. Legend has it that snakebite victims do not die if they are brought to the temple premises. The temple is built on Tantric principles. The temple was renovated recently with funds from the 14th financial commission.
