= Yamesvara Tank (Nala Kunda) =

Coordinates: 20.240290°N 85.832588°E

Religion
- Affiliation: Hinduism
- District: Old Town Bhubaneswar

Location
- Location: Yamesvara Patna
- State: Odisha
- Country: India
- Interactive map of Yamesvara Tank (Nala Kunda)

Yamesvara Tank is located in Yamesvara Patna, Old Town Bhubaneswar, Odisha, India. It is located in the left side of the Yamesvara Patna lane branching from Badheibanka Chowk to Kapilesvara. The tank is under Bharati Matha and it is now abandoned because the sewage water of the locality is discharging into the kunda. Hence it is also known as Nala kunda (Drain Tank). The tank is enclosed within a masonry embankment made of dressed laterite blocks.

== Name ==
i) Present Name: Yamesvara Tank (Nala kunda)

ii) Past Name: —

== Location ==
Lat. 200, 14’ 41" N.,

Long. 850, 49’ 90" E.,

Elev. 86 ft

== Ownership ==
- Single/ Multiple: Multiple
- Public/ Private: Public.

Any other (specify): Though the tank was originally under Bharati Matha, now no body claims ownership or looks after its maintenance.

== Age ==
- Precise date: —
- Approximate date: 11th Century A.D.

Source of Information: In view of its close proximity to Bharati matha, the tank may go along with Bharati matha which is assigned to 11th century A.D.

== Property Type ==
- Precinct/ Building/ Structure/Landscape/Site/Tank: Tank
- Subtype: Spring
- Typology: Embankments.

== Property use ==
- Abandoned/ in use: Abandoned.
- Present use: Nala kunda.
- Past use: Ritual and normal bath.

== Significance ==
Additional information needed

- Historic significance: Somavamsi epoch.
- Cultural significance: —
- Social significance: —
- Associational significance:—

== Physical description ==
Surrounding: The tank has embankments on all the four sides. The temple of Maitresvara stands near its south eastern embankment within a distance of 10.00 m, Yamesvara temple in north-west, private buildings on its northern and southern embankments. Now it is almost a dead tank.

Orientation: —

Architectural features (Plan and Elevation): Square on plan measuring 38.60 m^{2} with a depth of 4.00 m from the present ground level.

Raha niche & parsva devatas: —

Decorative features: —

Doorjambs: —

Lintel: —

Building material: Laterite

Construction techniques: Dry masonry.

Style: —

Special features, if any: —

== State of preservation ==
- Good/Fair/ Showing Signs of Deterioration/Advanced: Advanced state of deterioration because of the growth of wild vegetations on the both walls of the tank and inside the tank. Encroachment is another big problem the tank is facing.
- State of Decay/Danger of Disappearance: —

== Condition description ==
Signs of distress: Private residential building on all sides of the tank discharge their waste water and through into the tank.

Structural problems: Private residential buildings have been erected over the embankment walls of the tank.

Repairs and Maintenance: Though the tank was originally under Bharati Matha, now no body claims ownership or looks after its maintenance.

== Grade (A/B/C) ==
i) Architecture: A

ii) Historic: B

iii) Associational: C

iv) Social/Cultural:C

v) Others: —

== Threats to the property ==
Conservation Problem and Remedies: Encroachment, growth of wild vegetations and discharging of sewage and drain water and trash into the tank. Southern embankment has partly collapsed. Encroachments from all sides prevent access into the tank.
