= Paschimesvara Siva Temple =

- Location in Orissa

Religion
- Affiliation: Hinduism
- Deity: Mahishamardini

Location
- Location: Bhubaneswar
- State: Orissa
- Country: India
- Interactive map of Paschimesvara Siva Temple
- Coordinates: 20°14′46″N 85°50′02″E

Architecture
- Type: Kalingan Style (Kalinga Architecture)
- Completed: 8th century A.D.
- Elevation: 18 m (59 ft)

The Paschimesvara Siva Temple is located in Bhubaneswar, Odisha, India. This temple dates back to the 8th century AD, and belongs to the Bhaumakara period. The superstructure of the temple collapsed a long time ago, but the linga is still visible over fallen stones. Historians have gathered information about the temple from the stylistic features of the detached sculptures of Kartikeya, Ganesha, Parvati and Narasimha. A flight of steps leading to the lingam from the west suggest that the temple originally faced the west.

== Location ==
The temple is situated on the south-western embankment of the Bindusagar Lake, in Bhubaneshwar. Bhubaneswar is known locally as the “Temple City” because over 700 temples have been recorded in its vicinity. The temple is currently under private ownership.

== Significance ==
The structure is now ruined, however worship at the temple is still active. Locally, the shrine is referred to as "Big Shiva" in the vernacular language. Local traditions attribute the temple to the Kesharis (Somavamsis). Saivite rituals like Shivaratri and Sankranti are observed.

== Plan ==
The temple consists of the Markendesvara Siva Temple in the west at a distance of 15.5 meters, Akhdachandi in the northwest corner at a distance of 2 meters, Bindusagar in the east at a distance of 1.5 meters and private residential buildings in the south. The stones that make up the temple remnants are mostly sandstone and laterite.

== Threats to the Property ==
Four detached sculptures are kept in the northern side of the ruins. One is a four armed Parvati holding a rosary in her upper right hand and a nagapasa in the upper left hand. At the base, the deity is flanked by two female attendants and two animals, on either side. On the top there are two flying vidyadhara on either side carrying a garland in both hands.

The second detached sculpture is a four-armed Ganesha sitting over a decorated pedestal, supported by an Atlantid gana at the centre, which is flanked by two jackfruits. The deity is holding a parsu in his upper left hand and a modaka patra in the lower left hand, while his upper right hand is holding a rosary and the lower left hand is broken. Since the mouse mount is missing, the deity may be ascribed to the 7th or 8th century AD.

The third detached sculpture is a two-armed Kartikeya sitting on a peacock in lalitasana.

The fourth detached sculpture is a four-armed Narasimha image in his ugra form, standing on a decorated pedestal. The image is weather beaten and the features are not clear. In front of the Narasimha is a deulacharini.

== Grade ==
The grades of the temple are (A/B/C)

Architecture	C
Historic	C
Associational	C
Social/Cultural	C
