= Brahmeswara Temple =

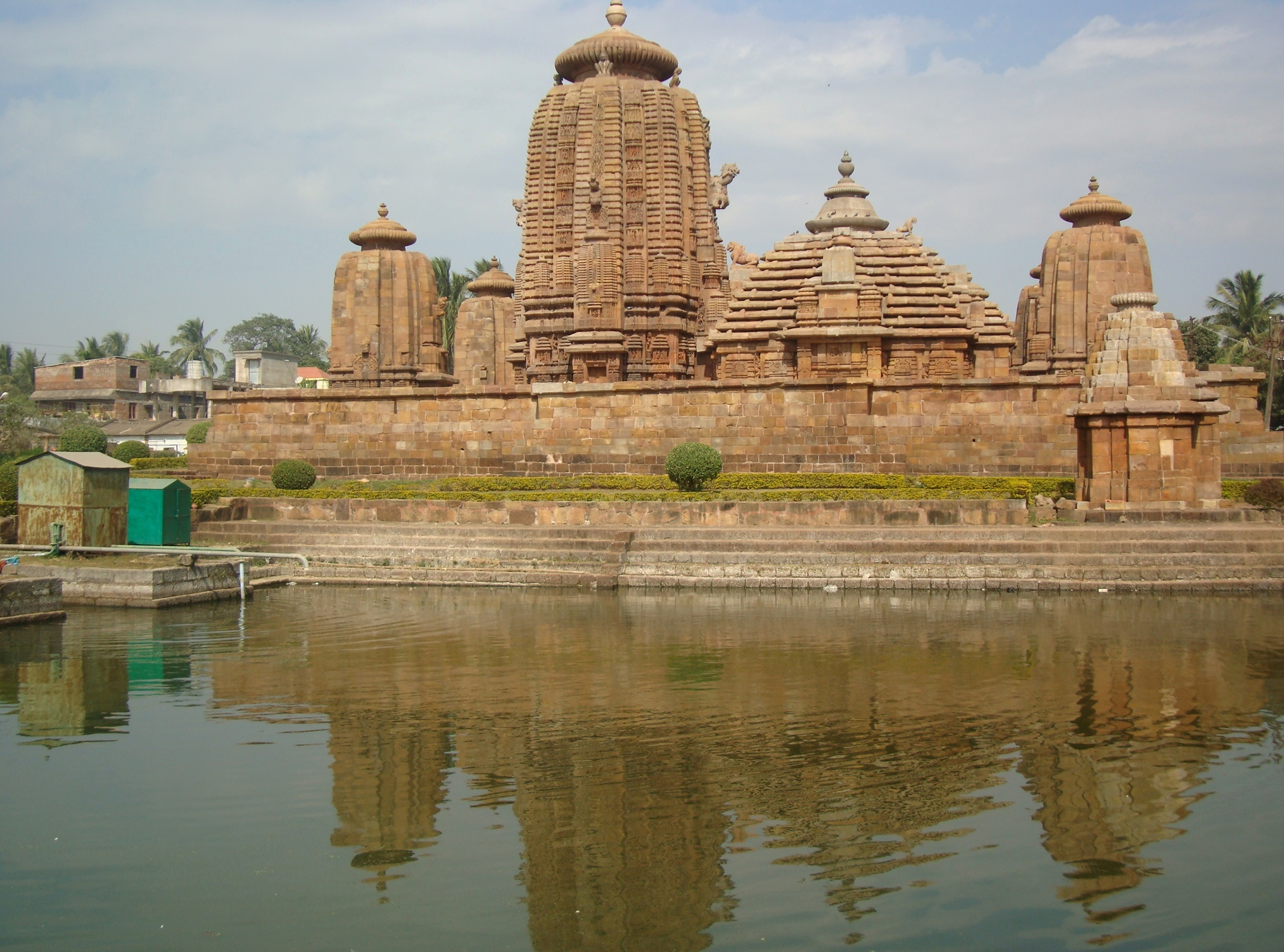
- Brahmeswara Temple

Religion
- Affiliation: Hinduism
- Deity: Brahmeswara

Location
- Location: Bhubaneshwar
- State: Odisha
- Country: India
- Interactive map of Brahmeswara Temple
- Coordinates: 20.239701°N 85.851764°E

Architecture
- Completed: 1058 CE

Brahmeswara Temple is a Hindu temple dedicated to Shiva located in Bhubaneswar, Odisha, India, erected at the end of the 9th century CE, is richly carved inside and out. This Hindu temple can be dated with fair accuracy by the use of inscriptions that were originally on the temple. They are now lost, but records of them preserve the information of around 1058 CE. The temple is built in the 18th regnal year of the Somavamsi king Udyotakesari by his mother Kolavati Devi, which corresponds to 1058 CE.

== History ==
Historians place the temple to belong to the late 11th century as ascertained from an inscription carried to Kolkata from Bhubaneswar. The inscription indicates that the temple was built by Kolavatidevi, the mother of Somavamshi king Udyota Keshari. It was built with four Natyasalas at a place known as Siddhatirtha in Ekamra Kshetra (modern-day Bhubaneswar). The inscription was recorded during the 18th renal year of Udyotha Keshari, corresponding to 1060 CE. Since the inscription is not in its original place, historians indicate the possibility of the reference to another temple, but based on the location and other features specified, it is ascertained that the inscription belongs to the temple. Also, another issue raised by Panigrahi is that the four cardinal temples are Angashalas (associate temples) and not Natyashalas (dance halls) as indicated in the inscription.

== Architecture ==
The temple is classified as a panchatanaya temple where apart from the main shrine, there are four subsidiary shrines in the four corners around the temple. The temple on account of its later origin has a perfectly developed structure compared to its predecessors. The vimana of the temple is 18.96 m (62.2 ft) tall. The temple is built with traditional architectural methods of wood carving, but applied on stone building. The buildings were built in a shape of full volume pyramid, and then they would be carved inside and outside. The total area of the land is 208.84 sq. m. and the temple is built on an area of 181.16 sq. m.

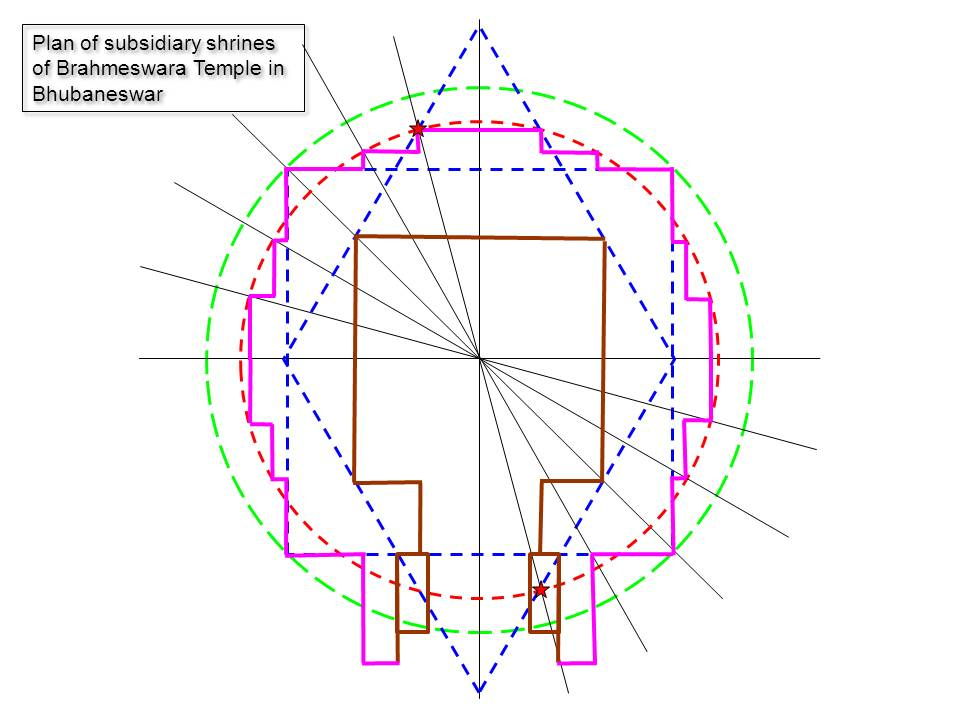
Plan of subsidiary shrines of Brahmeswara Temple complex.

The basic structure of the Odia temples has two connecting buildings. The smaller is the Jagmohana, or assembly hall. Behind it is the Shikhara, the towering sanctuary. Later temples have two additional halls in front—one for dancing, and the other for banquets.

The Brahmeswara shows quite a bit of affinity with the much earlier Mukteswar Temple, including the carved interior of the Jagmohana, and in the sculptural iconography such as the lion head motif, which appeared for the first time in the Mukteswara, and is here evident in profusion. There are quite a number of innovations, however, including the introduction of a great number of musicians and dancers, some holding lutes, on the exterior walls. For the first time in temple architectural history, iron beams find their first use.

On sandstone walls, there are symbolic decorations and the notion of godlike figures that help the believer in his meditation. The carvings over the door frame contain beautiful flower designs as well as flying figures. Like the Rajarani, there are images of the eight directional Guardian Deities. There are also quite a number of tantric-related images, and even Chamunda appears on the western facade, holding a trident and a human head, standing on a corpse. Shiva and other deities are also depicted in their horrific aspects.

One of the lost inscriptions stated that a Queen Kolavati presented 'many beautiful women' to the temple, and it has been suggested that this is evidence of the 'Devadasi' tradition, which assumed such importance in later Odia temple architecture and temple life.
