= Ahmedabad Kali Bari =

Hindu temple in Ahmedabad, India

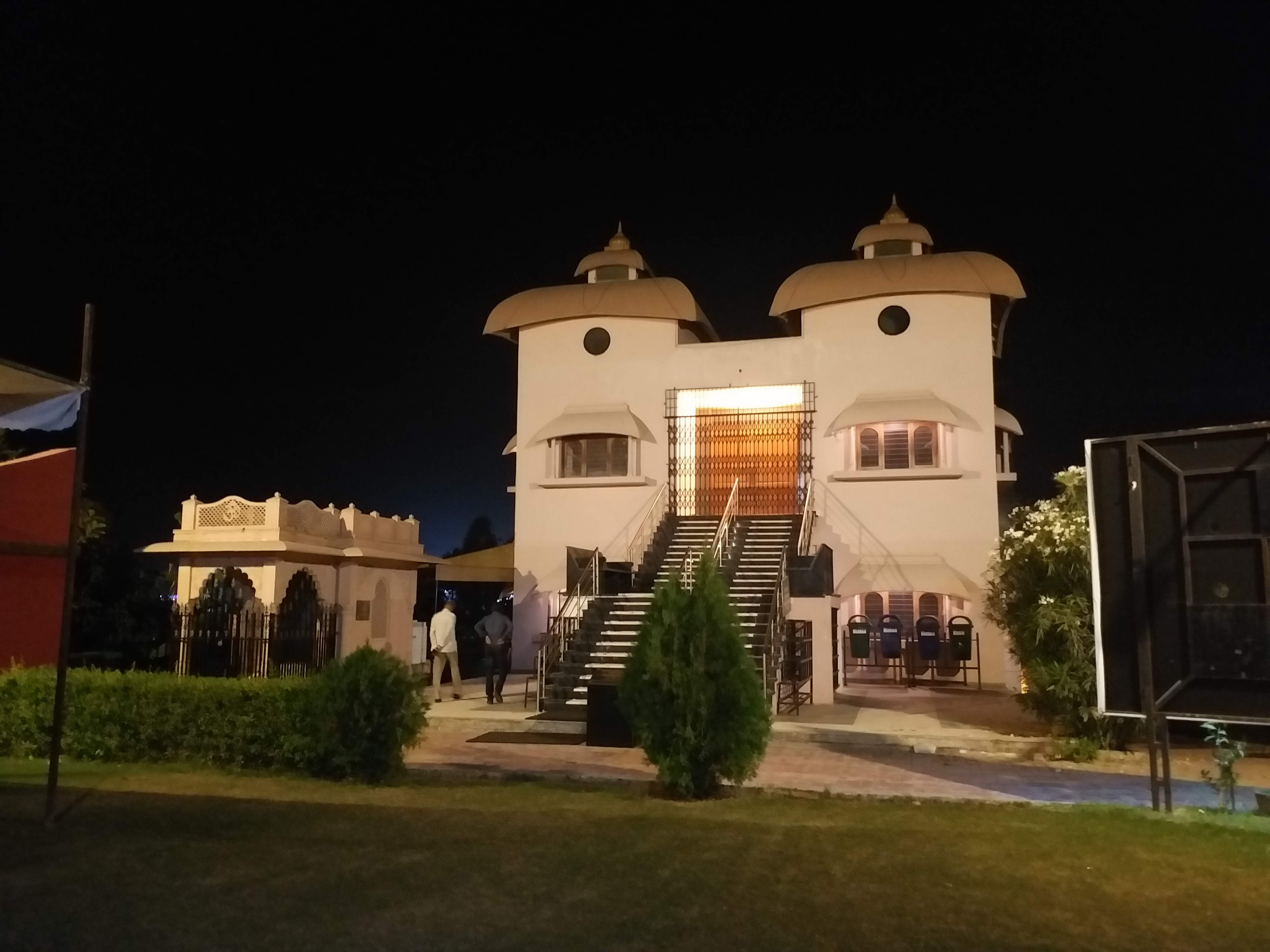
- Ahmedabad Kali Bari (October 2018)

- Location in Ahmedabad, Gujarat Ahmedabad Kali Bari (Gujarat)

Religion
- Affiliation: Hinduism
- District: Ahmedabad
- Deity: Kali

Location
- Location: Ahmedabad
- State: Gujarat
- Country: India
- Coordinates: 23°02′08.39″N 72°28′54.19″E

Architecture
- Type: Bengal architecture
- Completed: 2014

Website
- ahmedabadkalibari.com

Ahmedabad Kali Bari is a Hindu temple dedicated to Goddess Kali and the center for Bengali Culture in Ahmedabad, India. Established in 2014, it is situated on Kali Bari Road, West Ahmedabad.

== History ==
The temple was built in 2014 by the Bengal Cultural Association of Ahmedabad, one of the oldest Bengali community organizations in Gujarat.

The temple is also known for the Durga Puja festival that is held every year on a field next to it. More than 80 years ago, the group that is in charge of this Kali Bari held the first Durga Puja in Ahmedabad. In 2022, it celebrated the 85th Durga Puja.

== Architecture ==
The Ahmedabad Kali Bari is a special temple for the Bengali community in Ahmedabad, run by the city's oldest Bengali group, the Bengal Cultural Association (BCA). It is located on S G Road and is quite large, covering 2000 square yards of land. It was designed to bring Goddess Kali, Lord Shiva, Ram, Sita, Hanuman and Krishna all under the same roof. The main building of the temple is an example of Bengal architecture depicting traditional Bengali kutir (hut) style. The most important part of the temple is the statue of Goddess Kali. This statue is a perfect copy of the famous idol at the Dakshineswar temple in Kolkata. An artist named Sanathan Rudra Pal carved the statue. The temple was officially opened by a holy man, Swami Sadananda Saraswati Ji Maharaj from Sharda Peeth Dwarka.

== Gallery ==
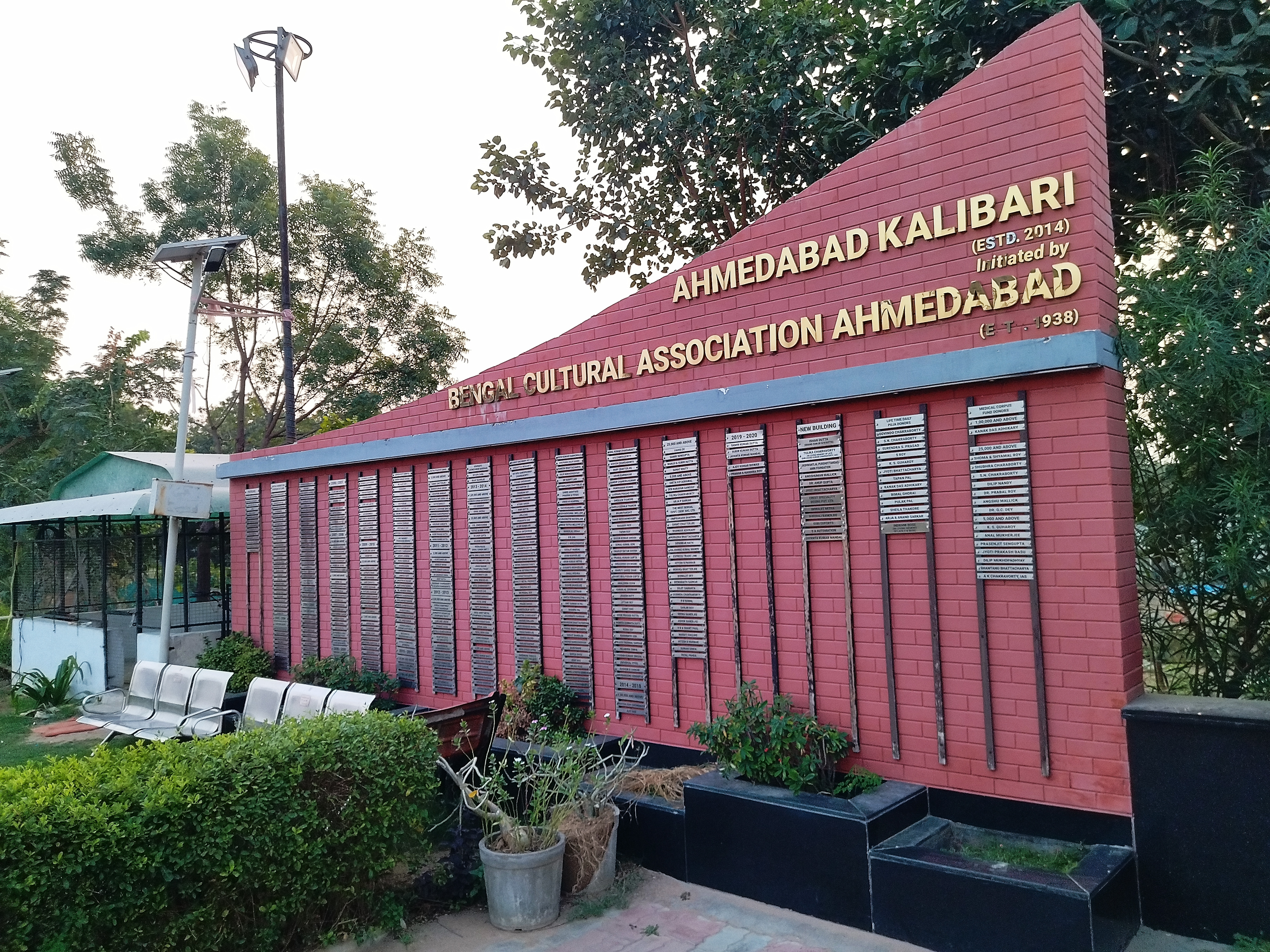
Wall of Fame (December 2021)

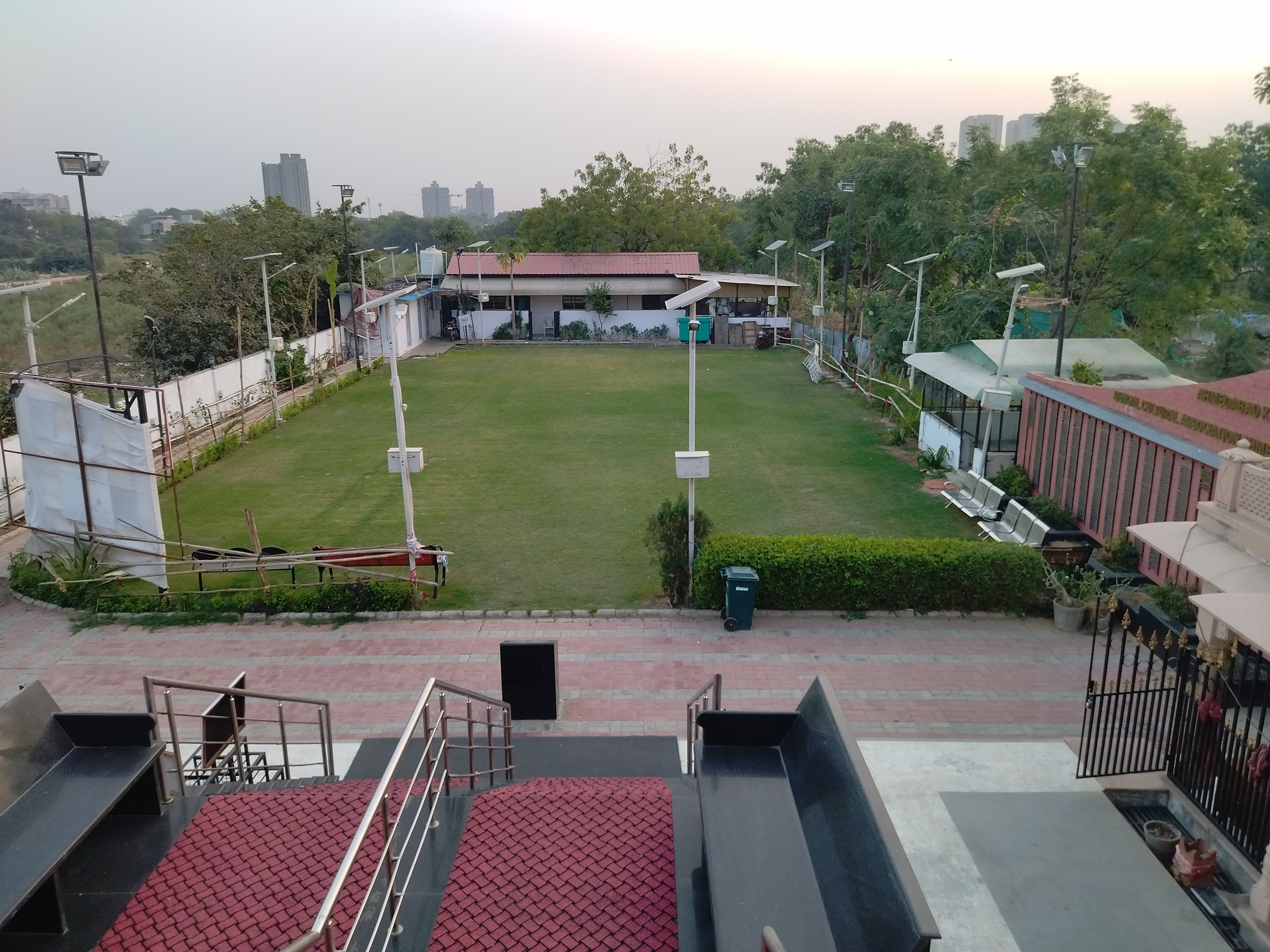
Community Ground (View from the North side) (December 2021)

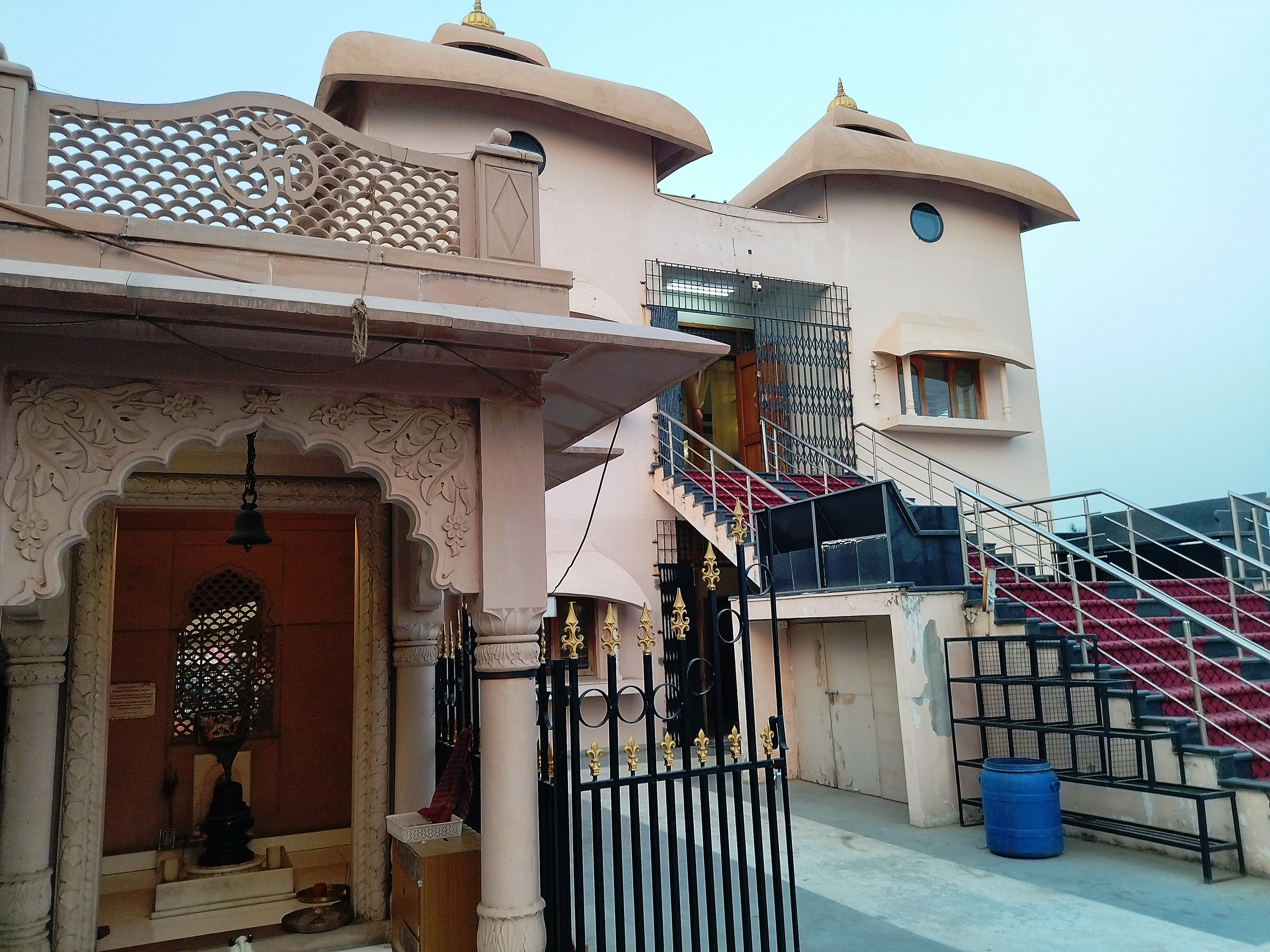
Shiv temple (December 2021)

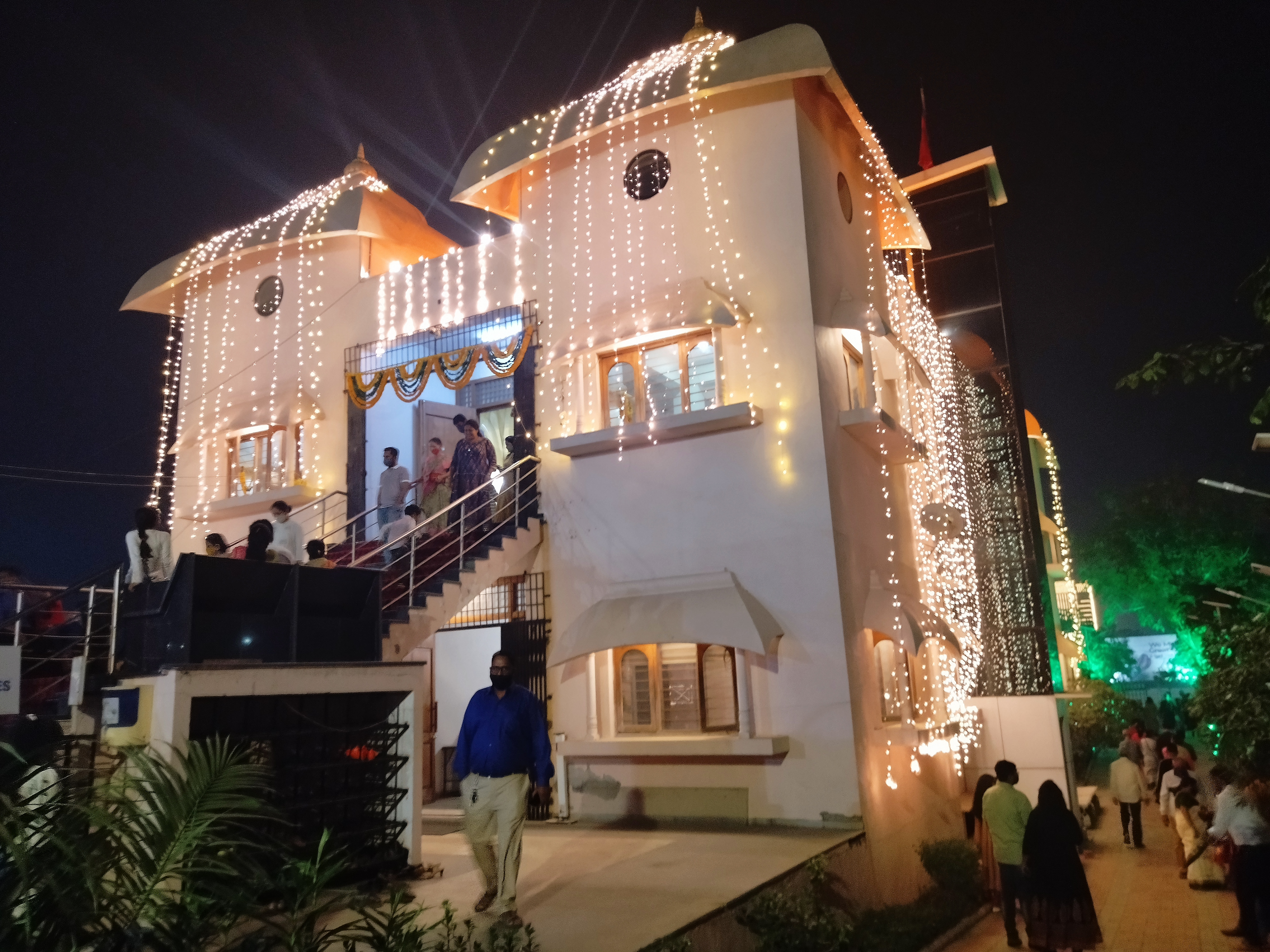
Ahmedabad Kali Bari (November 2021)

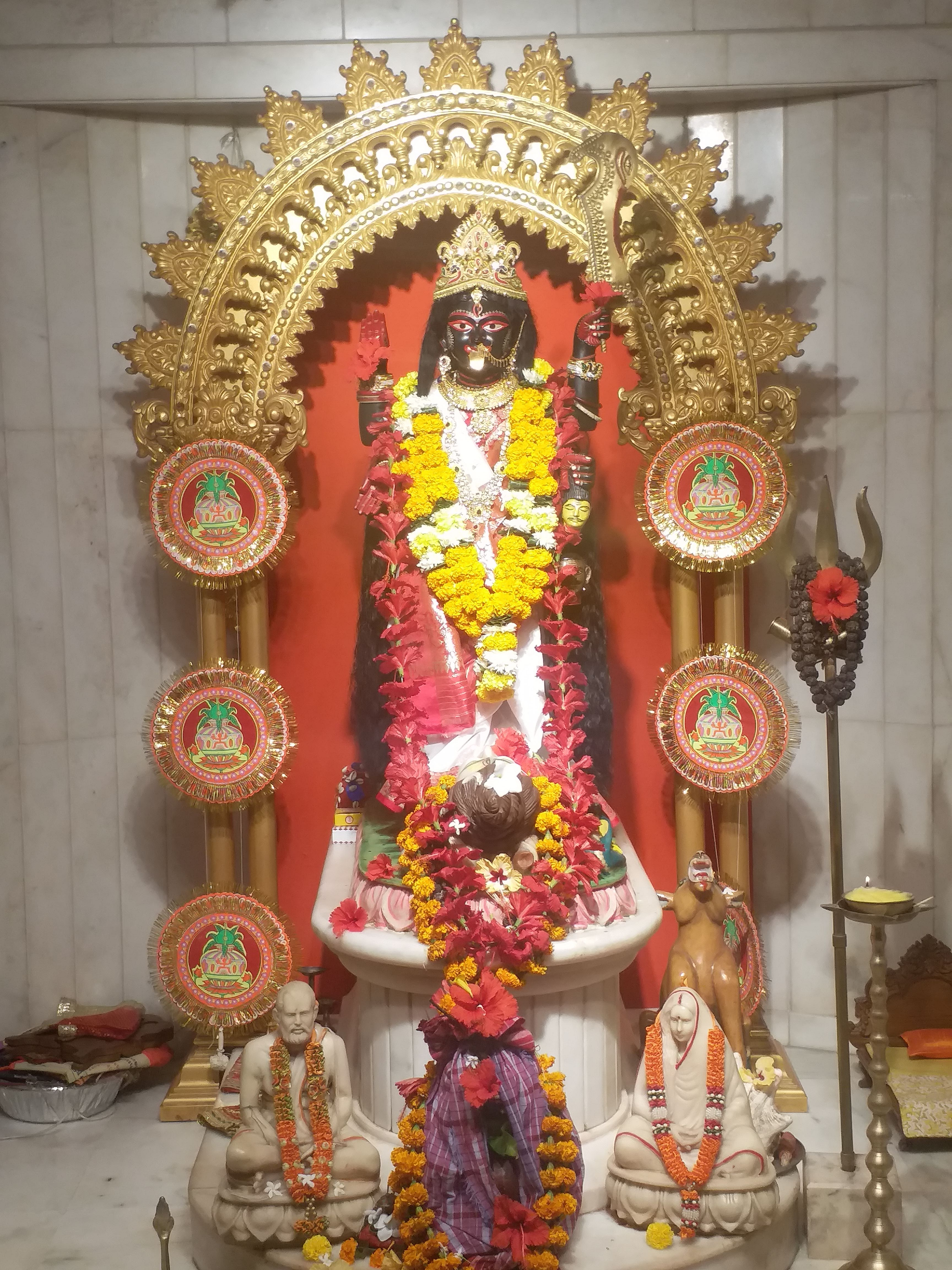
Goddess Kali of Ahmedabad Kali Bari (December 2019)

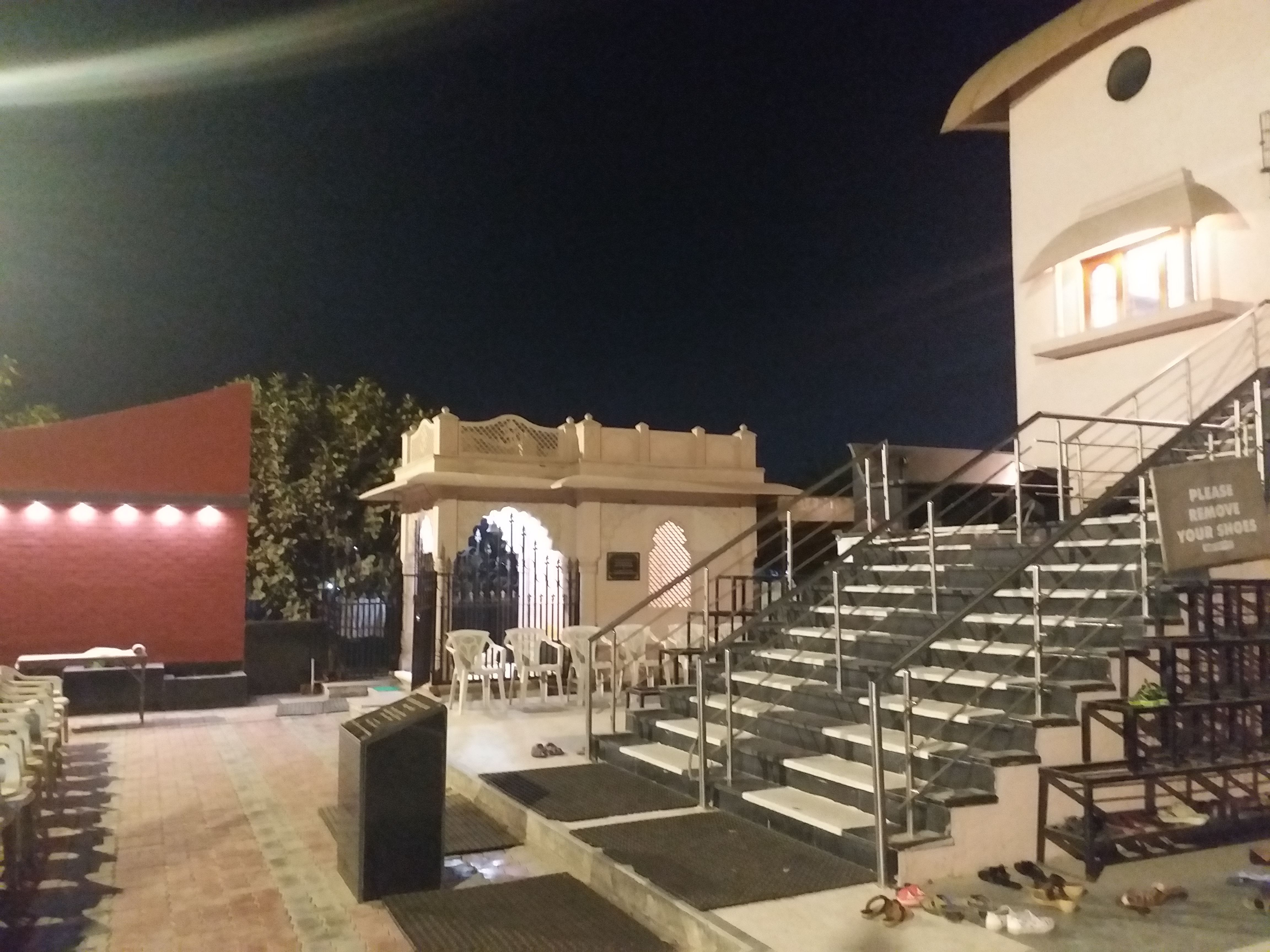
Courtyard (January 2019)

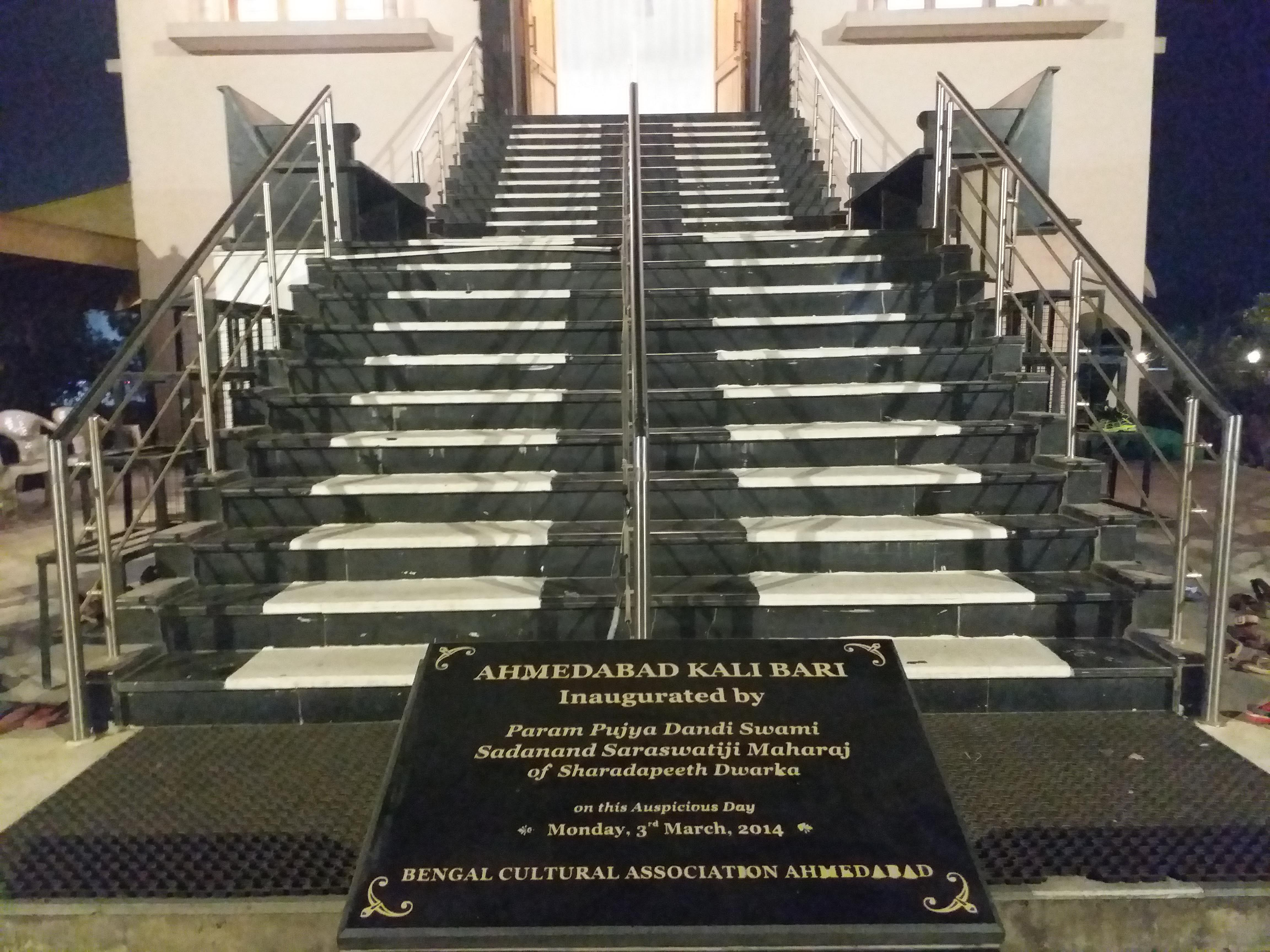
Temple's Stairs (January 2019)
