= List of Hindu temples in Bhubaneswar =

Bhubaneswar is the capital city of Odisha, India. It was the ancient capital of the Kalinga Empire and the architectural legacy of the period is its greatest attraction. There are many sites in the city that testify the importance of the region during the 7th to 11th century A.D when the Kalinga kings ruled Odisha and the regions beyond it. The Ananta Vasudeva Temple and Vindusagar tank in the only temple of Vishnu in the city of Shiva. The temples in Bhubaneswar are thus regarded as having been built from the 8th to 12th century of saivite influence.

The Jain and Buddhist shrines give a clear picture about the settlements around Bhubaneswar in the first two centuries B.C, and one of the most complete edicts of the Mauryan emperor, Ashoka, dating between 272 and 236 B.C, remains carved in rock just 5 miles to the southwest of the modern city.

Name of the temple	Deity	Picture	Architecture/Timeline	Notes/Beliefs
Aisanyesvara Siva Temple	Shiva		Kalinga, 13th Century	It is a 13th-century Hindu temple dedicated to Lord Shiva.
Akhadachandi Temple	Shiva		Kalinga, 10th Century	The temple is surrounded by Bindusagar tank in the east at a distance of 6.40 metres, Markandeya temple in the west and private residential buildings in the southern side. The temple faces south and the presiding deity faces east.
Ananta Vasudeva Temple 20°14′26.18″N 85°50′8.81″E	Krishna		13th Century	The temple was constructed in the thirteenth century, and the complete murties of Krishna, Balarama, and Subhadra are worshipped there. Balarama stands under a seven hooded serpent, while Krishna holds a mace, chakra and a conch. The temple dates back to the period of Chandrika Devi, the daughter of Anangabhima III, during the reign of the king Bhanudeva.
Astasambhu Temples 20°15′2″N 85°51′18″E	Shiva		10th Century	In the Uttaresvara Siva Temple precinct there are eight temples of identical size and dimension locally known as Astasambhu. Ashta means eight and Sambhu refers to another name of Lord Shiva. Five of them are arranged in one alignment are also known as Panchu Pandava.
Arjunesvara Siva Temple	Vishnu		Kalinga, 12th century	
Bata Mahadeva	Shiva		15th-16th Century	A small temple built in the middle of a road
Bharateswar Temple	Shiva		6th Century	Built during Shailodbhava rule
Bharati Matha	Vishnu		11th Century	It is a temple of the Hindu God Siva. This is one of the oldest temples in Bhubaneswar. The temple is a Hindu monastery with three stories which was built in the 11th century It is currently used for living Matha purposes and earlier it was used as a Hindu pilgrimage centre.
Bhringesvara Siva Temple	Shiva		8th Century	The main temple is of late Kalingan style dating back to 15th century. The present temple was built during the Gajapati Rulers. A four-handed black chlorite image of Brahma holding Veda and water vessel in upper two hands and rosary, abhaya mudra in lower two hand. The temple is situated on the foothills of Dhauli and the left bank of the river Daya, in the south-eastern outskirts of Bhubaneswar in the village Khatuapada.
Bhrukutesvar Siva Temple	Shiva		13th Century	It is a single structure pidha deul without any frontal porch. According to the local people, this temple was built by the Kesaris (Somavamsis).
Brahma Temple, Bindusagar	Brahma		15th Century	The main temple is of late Kalingan style dating back to 15th century. The present temple was built during the Gajapati Rulers. A four handed black chlorite image of Brahma holding Veda and water vessel in upper two hands and rosary, abhaya mudra in lower two hand.
Brahmeswara Temple	Shiva		11th Century	The temple was erected at the end of the 9th century, is richly carved inside and out. This Hindu temple can be dated with fair accuracy by the use of inscriptions that were originally on the temple. They are now lost, but records of them preserve the information of around 1058. The temple is built in the 18th regnal year of the Somavansi king Udyotakesari by his mother Kolavati Devi. This corresponds to 1058.
Byamokesvara Temple	Shiva		11th Century	It is located in front of the Lingaraj Temple across the road in the left side of the eastern gateway at a distance of 10.00 m. The temple faces towards the west. It is a living temple and the enshrined deity is a Siva lingam with a circular yonipitha at the centre of the sanctum. At present the sanctum is 1.50 m below the present road level. It is a recently recovered temple that had been buried. It was built in 10th century.
Chakreshvari Siva Temple	Shiva		10-11th Century	The temple stands on a low platform. On plan, the temple has a vimana and a renovated frontal porch. The vimana(shrine) is pancharatha and the frontal porch. On elevation, the vimana is of rekha order extends from pabhaga to kalasa. From bottom to the top, the temple has a bada, gandi and mastaka.
Champakesvara Siva Temple	Shiva		13th Century	It is 157 metres west of Parasuramesvara on the right side of the Kotitirthesvara lane leading to Bindu sagara. It is a laterite temple. Local people believe that the enshrined Siva lingam is patalaphuta and the precinct is the abode of nagas (champa naga) after whom the deity is named as Champakesvara.
Chandrasekhara Mahadeva Temple	Shiva		19th Century	It is a Hindu temple dedicated to Lord Siva located in the village Patia, Bhubaneswar. The enshrined deity is a Siva lingam within a circular yoni pitha. The temple has a private ownership but is held by many people at the same time.
Chintamanisvara Siva Temple	Shiva		14th Century	The temple dates back to 14th century According to local legend the temple was built by the Kesharis (Somavamsis). Various religious sacraments like Sivaratri, Siva vivaha, jalasaya, rudrabhisekha are performed here.
Devasabha Temple	Shiva		18th Century	It is located in the Kharakhia Vaidyanath temple precinct; it is an abandoned temple that faces east. There is no deity inside the cella. As per the locals, the temple is the assembly of all gods and goddess for which it is known as Devasabha.
Dishisvara Siva Temple	Shiva		15th Century	The presiding deity is a Siva-lingam within a circular yonipitha installed inside the sanctum. This 15th-century, privately owned temple is situated within a private compound surrounded by private residential buildings on three sides of east, west, south and the road on the north.
Duladevi Temple	Mahishamardini		18th Century	It is located on the right side of Duladevi Chowk in the village Kapilesvara in Bhubaneswar. It is 100 metres south east of Kapilesvara Siva temple. The presiding deity is a four armed Mahishamardini killing the buffalo demon.
Gandhi Garabadu Precinct Vishnu Temple	Vishnu		12-13th Century	It is situated on the right side of the temple road branching from Garej Chowk to Lingaraj temple. The temple faces west. The garbhagriha of the temple is empty. The cult icons on the outer walls and the dvarapalas in the doorjamb, suggest that the temple was originally dedicated to Lord Vishnu.
Gangesvara Siva Temple	Shiva		13-14th Century	The presiding deity is a Siva lingam within a circular yonipitha. It is a living temple and maintained by the Ganga Yamuna Sangathana.
Gokarnesvara Siva Temple	Shiva		1st Century BC	It is in close proximity to the ancient fort of Sisupalgarh, which is identified as the Kalinganagari of king Kharavela of the 1st century BC, the local legend assign the temple to 1st century BC and king Kharavela as the builder of the original temple. The temple fragments, however, do not agree to such an early date.
Gopal Tirtha Matha			16th Century	The Matha is located in front of the Chitrakarini temple is a branch of the Gopala Tirtha Matha of Puri. Gopala Tirtha was one of the prominent disciples of Sankaracharya, who commissioned monastic establishments in Puri and Bhuabaneswar.
Gosagaresvar Precinct Siva Temple	Shiva		14-15th century	The enshrining deity is a Siva lingam at the center of a circular yonipitha inside the sanctum measures 1.10 square metres as it faces towards west. According to the local legend once Lord Siva killed a calf inadvertently. In order to cleanse the sin of killing the calf he had to take a bath in the Gosagaresvara pond and worship the lord Gosagaresvara. In keeping with the tradition even today people suffering from the sin of killing cows, take ritual bath in the tank and worship Gosagaresvara to cleanse the sin.
Gourisankara Siva Temple	Shiva		9th century	The enshrined deity is a Siva lingam with a circular yonipitha in the sanctum which is 1.50 metres below the present road level. It is a living temple. The temple is buried from three sides up to the baranda portion and a narrow stepped passage from the west leads into the sanctum right from the road.
Jaleswar Siva Temple Precinct	Shiva		12th century	The presiding deity is a Siva-lingam within a circular yonipitha inside the sanctum, which is 1.15 meters below the chandrasila. The Sanctum measures 2.00 square meters. It is a living temple. According to the prevalent legend the king of Chudangagada was a devout worshipper of lord Lingaraja.
Kapilesvara Siva Temple	Shiva		14th century	The presiding deity is a Siva-lingam at the center of a circular yonipitha inside the sanctum. It is a living temple, facing towards east and maintained by Kapilesvara Temple Trust Board. The temple is situated within the precinct along with 33 other monuments.
Kartikesvara Siva Temple	Shiva		13th century	
Kharakhia Vaidyanatha Precinct	Shiva			
Kusesvara (Kushakeswara) Siva Temple	Shiva		15th century	The twin temples of Kushesvara and Labesvara are situated on both the sides of the road, almost opposite to each other in close proximity to the Ramesvara temple on the right and Satrughnesvara group of temples on the left side of the road leading from Kalpana square to Bindhu Sagar. Labesvara Siva temple is situated on the right side of the Ramesvara or Mausima road leading from Kalpana square. It is a living temple and facing towards west. The enshrined deity is a Siva lingam within a circular yonipitha inside the sanctum.
Labesvara (Labakeswara) Siva Temple	Shiva		15th century	The twin temples of Kushesvara and Labesvara are situated on both the sides of the road, almost opposite to each other in close proximity to the Ramesvara temple on the right and Satrughnesvara group of temples on the left side of the road leading from Kalpana square to Bindhu Sagar. Labesvara Siva temple is situated on the right side of the Ramesvara or Mausima road leading from Kalpana square. It is a living temple and facing towards west. The enshrined deity is a Siva lingam within a circular yonipitha inside the sanctum.
Ladu Baba Temple	Shiva		15th century	According to the local tradition, the deity was rescued and shifted from Ravana's Lanka to Ekamra Kshetra during the conflagration of Svarna Lanka on the eve of Rama-Ravana war.
Lakhesvara Siva Temple	Shiva		13th century	Lakhesvara Siva temple is located in the right side of the Ganges–Yamuna road, behind the Lingaraja market complex, Old town, Bhubaneswar. It is situated at a distance of 70 metres north east of Lingaraj temple and at a distance of 10 metres south of Gangesvara and Yamunesvara Siva temple across the road.
Lakhmaneswara temple	Shiva		6th century	Built during Shailodbhava rule.
Lingaraj Temple 20°14′18″N 85°50′01″E	Shiva		11th century	It is a Hindu temple dedicated to Harihara, another name for Lord Siva is the biggest of all at Bhubaneswar is located within a spacious compound wall of laterite measuring 520 feet by 465 feet. The wall is 7 feet 6 inches thick and surmounted by a plain slant coping. Alongside the inner face of the boundary wall there runs a terrace probably meant to protect the compound wall against outside aggression.
Lingaraj Rest House			14th century	
Lokanath Siva Temple 20°15′22″N 85°50′18″E	Shiva		15th century	
Madneswar Siva Temple	Shiva		12th century	It is a Hindu temple dedicated to Lord Siva built around 12th century. It is situated on the left side of the Mahavir Lane branching from Garage Chowk in Santarapur to Sisupalgarh. The enshrined deity is a Siva lingam within a circular yonipitha (basement). It is a broken shrine, and at present, only the Pabhaga portion is available.
Mangalesvara Siva Temple	Shiva		14th century	The Mangalesvara Siva Temple is located in the precinct of Papanasini tank and on the southern embankment of the tank. The temple faces east and the enshrined deity is a circular yonipitha. The Lingam is absent. The temple is 1.60 metres below the present road level.
Mukteswar Temple	Shiva		970	It is a 10th-century Hindu temple dedicated to Lord Siva. The temple dates back to 970, is a monument of singular importance in the study of the development of Hindu temples in Odisha. In this stylistic development the Mukteswara plays a pivotal role; it marks the culmination of all earlier developments, and initiates a period of experiment which continues for an entire century, as seen in such temples as the Rajarani Temple and Lingaraj temple, both located in Bhubaneswar.
Nagesvara Temple, Bhubaneswar	Shiva		10th Century	It is a disused Hindu temple. It is situated on the western right bank of the Lingaraja West Canal at a distance of 10.35 metres (34.0 ft) west of Subarnesvara Siva Temple, located across the canal.
Pabaneswara Temple	Shiva		10th Century	The presiding deity is a Sivalingam within a circular yonipitha inside the sanctum. It is a living temple. The temple is surrounded by private residential buildings and market complex on three sides and the road on the south. The temple was rebuilt or renovated sometimes back as it appears from the second phase of building from above the pabhaga.
Parsurameswar Temple	Shiva		650	It is the best preserved specimen of an early Hindu temple datable to the Sailodbhava period of the seventh and eighth centuries. Parsurameswar is dedicated to Shiva and is one of the oldest temples in Odisha. This temple, built about 650, has all the main features of the pre-10th century Odishan style of architecture. Such elements such as the pine spire that curves up to a point over the sanctum housing the presiding deity, and the pyramid-covered hall where people sit and pray. Though small in size, with its deul rising abruptly to a height of 12.80m, it is one of the most sumptuously decorated temples of the early period. It is the only temple of the early period with a surviving Jagamohana.
Purvesvara Siva Temple	Shiva		13th-14th century	The enshrining deity is a broken Lingam within a circular Yonipitha at the centre of the sanctum, which is 1.07 metres below the present ground level. It is a living temple and now under the care and maintenance of Purvesvara Temple Development Association of that locality. The caretaker of the temple is Dipu Panigrahi. According to local tradition, the presiding deity is known as Purvesvara as it is situated towards the east of Lingaraj.
Rajarani Temple	Shiva		11th century	It is an 11th-century Hindu temple dedicated to Lord Siva. Originally it was known as Indreswara, and serves as a shrine to Shiva. It is known as 'love temple', covered with coyly erotic carvings of women and couples. The temple is aesthetically endearing with its graceful sculptures.
Ram Mandir, Janpath	Lord Ram		20th century	It is a temple housing beautiful images of Lord Rama, Lord Lakshman, and Goddess Sita. The high rising spire of the main temple visible from many parts of the capital city, is its main attraction. Built and managed by a private trust, the temple complex also comprises shrines devoted to ochre-painted marble idols of Lord Hanuman, Lord Shiva and other gods.
Rameshwar Deula	Shiva		9th century	Legend goes as when Rama was returning from Lanka after victory over Ravana, Goddess Sita asked to worship Shiva here. So Ramachandra built a Linga for that purpose. Traditionally during Ashokashtami, which falls one day before to Rama Navami in Chaitra Lord Lingaraja comes to this temple by a large chariot called Rukuna Rath and stays for four days. Historically the temple dates back to 9th century.
Sarvatresvara Siva Temple	Shiva		10th century A.D.	It enshrines a Siva-lingam within a circular yonipitha inside the sanctum. It is a living temple and Bibhuti Bhusan Das is the chief priest of the temple. As per the chief priest it is a Patalaphuta linga. The temple precinct is located on the right bank of the stream Gangua.
Satrughaneswara temple	Shiva		6th century A.D.	Built during Sailodbhava Rule in later half of 6th century, it is one of the oldest temples of Bhubaneswar.
Sivatirtha Matha				It is a Hindu Matha(monastery) in the outskirts of old town of Bhubaneswar and is known for Chandan Yatra and Dola purnima. Dola Purnima is celebrated in the belief that Lord Lingaraja arrives to this Matha to take pankti bhogo(community lunch)on Dola Purnima.
Subarnesvara Siva Temple	Shiva		10th century A.D.	It is situated on the left bank of Lingaraja west canal, which can be approached through Kotitirthesvara lane leading from Parasuramesvar temple to Bindu sagar. It stands opposite to Nagesvara across the Lingaraja west canal at a distance of 10.35 metres. The temple faces east. The enshrined deity is a Siva lingam within a circular yoni pitha in the sanctum measuring 2.35 square metres, which is 1.20 metres below the chandrasila of the door.
Suka Temple	Shiva		13th century A.D.	It is abandoned and not in use. The temple is devoted to saptaratha and the presence of female counterparts of the dikpalas in the upara jangha. This was built in the matured phase of temple building tradition of Odisha.
Sukutesvara Temple	Shiva		16th Century A.D.	It is serves as purpose for community gathering. The preceding deity in this temple is a Siva- lingam (Lord Shiva) situated at the centre. The temple observes various religious sacraments like Mahasivaratri, Chandipatha, and Rudrabhisekha.
Svapnesvara Siva Temple	Shiva		13th-14th century	It is close to the Purvesvara Siva temple. The temple faces east. The Sanctum of the temple is empty that measures 2.00 square m.
Talesvara Siva Temple	Shiva			The Talesvara Siva temple is a Hindu temple. It is a living temple that means people use it in worshiping purpose.
Uttaresvara Siva Temple	Shiva		7th century A.D.	Uttaresvara Siva temple is located within a precinct in the northern embankment of Bindusagar tank in the Nalamuhana Sahi, Kedara-Gouri Chowk, Old Town, Bhubaneswar. The enshrining deity in this temple is a Siva lingam within a circular yoni pitha at the centre of sanctum. The original temple has collapsed, as evident from the renovation work above the pabhaga and presence of cult images of earlier phase in different parts of the temple walls without conforming to the canonical prescriptions.
Vaital Deula	Shiva		9th Century A.D.	Vaital Deul Temple's striking feature is the shape of its sanctuary tower. The semi-cylindrical shape of its roof a leading example of khakhara order of temples—bears an affinity to the Dravidian Gopuram of the South India temples. Its gabbled towers with a row of shikaras reveals unmistakable signs of southern intrusion.
Vishnu Temple, Bhubaneswar	Vishnu		12th Century A.D.	It is situated on the eastern embankment of Bindu Sagar at Talabazar, on the right side of the Talabazar road leading from Lingaraj temple to Kedara-Gouri lane. The temple faces west and the Sanctum is presently used for storage purposes. The sculptural embellishment on the outer wall and the parsavadevatas in raha niche suggests that the temple was originally dedicated to Vishnu.
Yameshwar Temple; 20°14′25″N 85°49′53″E	Yama		12th Century	The main Vimana is of Rekha Deula, Jagamohana is of Pidha Deula. Many portions of the temple are destroyed by natural calamities as the temple is built by sandstone. The outer Prakara is built of laterite. The icons around the temple include many motifs like serpents, amorous images, animals, Dikpalas etc. The inner Garbhagriha houses Shivalinga. The building time of the temple is late 12th century during the Eastern Ganga dynasty
Laxminrusingha Temple	Narasimha			
Tribeniswar Temple	Shiva			
