= Byamokesvara Temple =

- Location in Orissa

Religion
- Affiliation: Hinduism
- Deity: Lord Shiva

Location
- Location: Bhubaneswar
- State: Orissa
- Country: India
- Interactive map of Byamokesvara Temple
- Coordinates: 20°14′17.19″N 85°50′4.94″E

Architecture
- Type: Kalingan Style (Kalinga Architecture)
- Completed: 10th century AD
- Elevation: 27 m (89 ft)

Suresvara Mahadeva temple, also known as Byamokesvara temple, is located in the Tala bazaar market complex, Old Town of Bhubaneswar, the capital of the state of Orissa, India. The temple is located in front of the Lingaraj Temple across the road in the left side of the eastern gateway at a distance of 10.00 m. The temple faces towards the west. It is a living temple and the enshrined deity is a Siva lingam with a circular yonipitha at the centre of the sanctum. At present the sanctum is 1.50 m below the present road level. It is a recently recovered temple that had been buried. It was built in 10th century AD. The temple is maintained by the local shopkeepers.

== Significance ==
The locals ascribe the temple to the Kesharis (Somavamsis). Festivals like Maha Shivratri or Sivaratri, Sankranti, Jalabhisheka etc. are observed.

== The Temple ==
The temple is surrounded by shops on the northern and southern sides, residential buildings to the east and the road to the west. Except the entrance on the west, the entire temple is buried up to the baranda portion of the bada. Hence, the ground plan of the temple could not be ascertained. However, it is pancharatha in plan with a central raha and pairs of anuratha and kanika pagas on either side of the raha. There are five flights of steps leading down into the sanctum which is 1.50 m below the present road level. In elevation, the vimana is of rekha deul and measures 7.00 m in height from baranda to mastaka. The gandi measures 5.00 m and the mastaka measures 2.00 m in height.

The gandi is devoid of any sculptural embellishment. During the renovation work, red coloured wash has been given to the temple. The doorjambs are decorated with three vertical bands and the river goddesses are usually found in the upper part of the door frame on either side of the navagraha slab. The doorjamb measures 1.72 m high x 1.30 m wide. Ganga is found on the right side of the doorframe and Yamuna in the left. They stand over their respective vehicles with their outside hand on the thigh and the uplifted inside hand holding a vase as in the examples in the Muktesvara compound. Their hair is stylistically depicted and their faces are illuminated by an identical soft and warm smile. Both are associated with dwarf-attendants. At the base of the doorjamb, Saivite dvarapala are found on either side, whose upper parts only are visible.

In the lalatabimba, there is a Gaja-lakshmi image. The deity is holding two lotuses in her two hands over which elephants are standing on either side. The architrave above the doorjambs measuring 1.85 m is carved with the navagrahas. Ketu is depicted as a full figure on his knees as seen in the Tirthesvara temple.

The building material used for the construction of the temple is coarse grey sandstone. The construction technique is dry masonry and the style is Kalingan. The river goddesses are found in the upper part of the doorjamb. This is an exception in the temples of Bhubaneswar. Generally, they are found at the base of the doorjamb along with the dvarapalas.

== See also ==
- List of temples in Bhubaneswar
