= Lokanatha =

Lokanatha may refer to:

- Lokanatha, one of the thousand names of Shiva
- An emanation or avatar of the Buddhist bodhisattva Avalokiteśvara
- Lokanatha (Salvatore Cioffi), Italian Buddhist missionary
- Lokanath Behera, Indian Police Service officer
- Lokanath Choudhary, Indian politician
- Lokanatha Goswami, Gaudiya Vaishnava saint
- Lokanath Misra, Indian politician
- Lokanath Mishra, Indian politician
- Lokanatha Temple, a Hindu temple in India
- Lokanatha Siva Temple, a Hindu temple in Odisha

== See also ==
- Loknath (1927–2018), an Indian actor
- Lokanathan IAS, a 2005 Indian film
- Lokanath Siva Temple, a Hindu temple in Odisha, India
