= Bharati Matha Temple =

Bharati Matha
- Location in Orissa

Religion
- Affiliation: Hinduism
- Deity: lord Vishnu

Location
- Location: Bhubaneswar
- State: Orissa
- Country: India
- Interactive map of Bharati Matha
- Coordinates: 20°14′25.53″N 85°49′56.54″E

Architecture
- Type: Kalingan Style (Kalinga Architecture)
- Completed: 11th century AD.
- Elevation: 26 m (85 ft)

Website
- www.ignca.nic.in/

Bharati Matha Temple is a temple of the Hindu God Siva in Bhubaneswar, Orissa, India, The temple is a Hindu monastery with three stories which was built in the 11th century AD. It is currently used for living Matha purposes and earlier it was used as a Hindu pilgrimage centre.

== Location ==
Bharati Matha is located in the Badheibanka Chowk, Old Town Bhubaneswar. One can approach the Matha on the left side of Ratha road leading from Lingaraja to Ramesvara. Goswami is the present Mahanta of the Matha. It is one of the oldest Hindu monasteries of Bhubaneswar. The Matha is surrounded by Ratha road in east, Jamesvara Patna road in south, private buildings in north and Bhrukutesvara temple in west. The Matha is facing towards the west.

== Tradition and legends ==
According to local legend as narrated by the Mahanta, the monastery was established by Yajati Kesari, the builder of the Lingaraja Temple, and the Matha was initially used to house the artisans who were engaged in the construction of Lingaraja Temple.

== Significance ==
=== Cultural ===
Rituals like Kartika purnima, Prathamastami, Durga puja, etc., are celebrated. During Prathamastami, Lord Lingaraja comes here to visit his uncle in the Matha.

== Architectural features ==
The Matha is square on a plan measuring 26.00 m^{2}. The Matha stands on a high platform measuring 1.50 metres and it has seven mouldings. On elevation, the Matha is a three storied building measuring 11.50 metres in height. With a central courtyard, there are three living rooms in each side of the Matha. Each room measures 6.15 metres in length x 3.45 metres in width. The Matha is enclosed by a massive compound wall that measures 53.60 square metres with a height of 2.52 metres. Doorjambs: The doorjamb of the Matha measures 1.70 metres in height x 0.84 metres in width, with a thickness of 0.35 metres. This temple is made up of coarse grey sandstone and the construction technique is masonry type.

== Preservation ==
Showing signs of deterioration because of the growth of wild vegetation and the collapse of wall and superstructure in the east and north. There is damage all over the walls due to the growth of vegetation. The Matha is in a dilapidated condition. The rooms in the western wing have already collapsed and only the outer wall exists. The southern wing, which is now used, is also in a dilapidated condition and first floors have collapsed. Rain water is seeping inside the rooms through the cracks in the roof creating danger to the structure. It was repaired by the Matha Mahanta recently during Durgapuja but only a little work has been done. The building needs total restoration and conservation in view of its archaic architecture.

== Burial temples ==
Pipal trees and Asoka trees are found on the outer wall of the Matha on the northern and southern sides. In the southern side of the entrance there is a cluster of nine small temples and a few detached sculptures and temple fragments kept within a small compound, behind the Matha shrine of Talesvara Siva temple. These nine temples of Pidha order enshrine the Siva lingam in the sanctum. According to the Matha legend these temples are dedicated to the previous Matha Mahantas in recognition of their contribution and religious merits. These shrines have been erected upon the burial of the deceased Mahantas, which was an interesting and important Matha tradition in the past. These shrines have been named as burial temples to distinguish them from the other temples.

== See also ==
- List of temples in Bhubaneswar
- Temple Gallery

== Reference notes ==
1. K. C. Panigrahi, Archaeological Remains at Bhubaneswar, Calcutta, 1961. P. 19.
2. T. E. Donaldson, Hindu Temple Art of Orissa, Vol. I, Leiden, 1985, P. 64.
