= Bharateswar Temple =

Bharateswara Shiva Temple
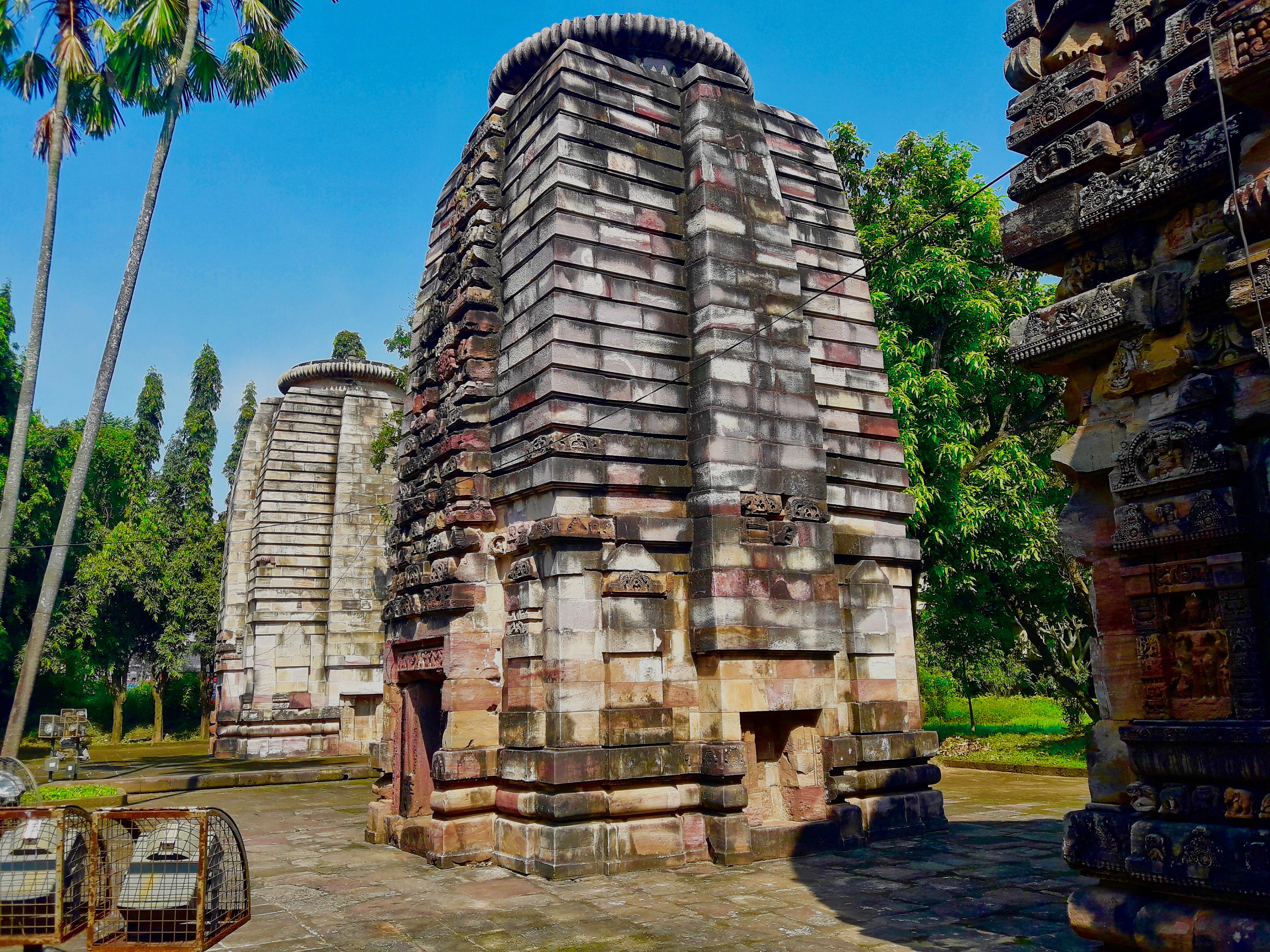

- Location in Odisha Bharateswar Temple (India)

Religion
- Affiliation: Hinduism
- Deity: Shiva

Location
- Location: Bhubaneswar
- State: Odisha
- Country: India
- Interactive map of Bharateswara Shiva Temple
- Coordinates: 20°15′11.65″N 85°50′11.26″E

Architecture
- Style: Kalinga architecture
- Completed: 6th century CE

Website
- www.ignca.nic.in/

Bharateswara Shiva Temple is a 6th-century Hindu temple dedicated to Lord Shiva located in Bhubaneswar, the capital of Odisha, India. The enshrined deity is a Shivalinga within a circular yonipitha (basement). Rituals like Shivratri, is observed here. Located on the left side of the road leading from Kalpana chowk to Lingaraja temple and just opposite to the Ramesvara temple. The temple has a rekha vimana of early Kalingan order. It is one of the earliest existing temple of Odisha.

== History ==
The temple was constructed in the later half of 6th century CE during the Sailodbhava rule. The Odisha State Archaeology has renovated parts of the temple.

== Architecture ==
The temple is constructed in the rekha vimana of early Kalingan order architecture style using sandstone. The sandstones are carved with very ancient design by the workers. The entrance is short as it was believed that the devotees should lean down against God. On the basis of architectural scheme and an inscription in the lintel of Laxmanesvara temple, which is adjacent to it, the temple can be assigned to 6th century AD. The temple is triratha on plan and triangabada in elevation (the outer wall divided into three sections).

== See also ==
- List of temples in Bhubaneswar
- Bharatesvara Temple Phots
- Bharatesvara Temple
