= Lakhesvara Siva Temple =

Lakhesvara Siva temple.
- Location in Odisha Lakhesvara Siva Temple (India)

Religion
- Affiliation: Hinduism
- Deity: Siva

Location
- Location: Bhubaneswar
- State: Odisha
- Country: India
- Interactive map of Lakhesvara Siva temple.
- Coordinates: 20°15′22″N 85°50′18″E

Architecture
- Type: Kalingan Style (Kalinga Architecture)
- Completed: 13th century A.D.
- Elevation: 18 m (59 ft)

Lakhesvara Siva temple (13th century AD.) Location: Lat 20° 14’ 33"N, Long 85° 50’ 17" E, Elev 60 ft. Approach- Lakhesvara Siva temple is located in the right side of the Ganges–Yamuna road, behind the Lingaraja market complex, Old town, Bhubaneswar, Orissa, India. It is situated at a distance of 70 metres north east of Lingaraj temple and at a distance of 10 metres south of Gangesvara and Yamunesvara Siva temple across the road. The temple is facing towards the east. The enshrining deity is a Siva lingam within a circular yoni-pitha, which is 0.77 metres below the chandrasila.

== Tradition and legends ==
The local peoples are indifferent towards the historical legends of the temple. It is looked after by the members of the Ganga-Yamuna Sangathana. Address: Gangas–Yamuna Road, Old town, Bhubaneswar.

== Source of Information ==
Saptaratha plan and anuratha paga is decorated with lotus design.

i) Historic significance: The local tradition attribute the temple to the Gangas

ii) Cultural significance: Sivaratri, Sankranti, Chandana utsav, Kartika-purnima, jalabhisheka etc. are celebrated in its premise.

iii) Social significance: The temple precinct is used for public meetings.

== Physical description ==
i) Surrounding: The temple is surrounded by the Ganges–Yamuna road in north, and private residential buildings in the rest three sides. The temple is facing towards east.

ii) Architectural features: At present, the temple stands over a low pista measuring 11.80 metres in length x 5.70 metres in width x 0.43 metres in height. On plan, the temple is saptaratha with a square vimana and a renovated frontal porch. The viamana measures 5.40 square metres and porchmeasuring 0.90 metres extending towards east. The cella of the temple measures 2.45 square metres. On elevation, the deul is of rekha order with bada, gandi, mastaka measuring 13.05 metres in height. The bada has fivefold divisions measuring 3.55 metres in height. Pabhaga (0.93 metres) has five moulding, tala jangha (0.83 metres), bandhana with three mouldings (0.27 metres), upara jangha (0.87 metres) baranda with seven mouldings (0.65 metres). The gandi of the temple measuring 6.00 metres in height. The mastaka measures 3.50 metres in height that consists of beki, amlaka, khapuri and kalasa.

iii) Raha niche & parsva devatas: The parsvadevata niches located on the raha paga of the talajangha on three sides of north, south and west measure 0.81 metres in height x 0.57 metres in width x 0.23 metres in depth. All are empty.

== Decorative features ==
The base of the raha niche at the pabhaga portion is decorated with the talagarvika. The raha niche is surmounted by a bho motif in which a stylized chitya motif is flanked by two women and a conch on either sides. Above it there is the Gajakranta. The beki recess houses Saivite deities above the raha and do-pichha simha above the kanika pagas. The conjunction between the anu ratha and kanika pagas are decorated with a small pagas of lotus design. The raha paga is decorated with series of chaitya design and anuratha paga is decorated with a series of miniature rekha deul as angasikharas. The temple is ten-storeyed with the kanika accommodating ten bhumi-amlas. Doorjamb: The doorjamb is a recent addition and devoid of any ornamentation. Lintel: The graham architrave is also plain.

== Special features ==
The base of the raha niche at pabhaga portion is decorated with a rekha deul flanked by two vertical pilasters and the conjunction of the pagas decorated with lotus design that renders the temple to be saptaratha.

== State of preservation ==
Seepage of rain water is occurring due through the cracks in the roof and walls of the superstructure. Cracks are noticed in the northern wall of the cella. The bada portions in south-west corner of the temple is partly chopped off.

== See also ==
- List of temples in Bhubaneswar

== Reference notes ==
- Lesser Known Monuments of Bhubaneswar by Dr. Sadasiba Pradhan (ISBN 81-7375-164-1).
- http://www.ignca.nic.in/
- List of Hindu temples in India#Odisha
