= Jaleswar Siva Temple Precinct =

Jalesvara Siva Temple Precinct
- Location in Odisha

Religion
- Affiliation: Hinduism
- Deity: Shiva

Location
- Location: Bhubaneswar
- State: Odisha
- Country: India
- Coordinates: 20°21′40″N 85°51′10″E

Architecture
- Type: Kalinga Architecture
- Completed: 12th century A.D.
- Elevation: 23 m (75 ft)

Jalesvara Siva Temple Precinct is a Hindu Temple dedicated to Shiva situated on the southern outskirt of the village Kalarahanga at a distance of 2.00 km from Patia and 6.00 km south of Chudangagada in the northern outskirt of Bhubaneswar, Odisha, India. The presiding deity is a Siva-lingam within a circular yonipitha inside the sanctum, which is 1.15 meters below the chandrasila. The sanctum measures 2.00 square meters.

== Legend ==
According to the prevalent legend, the king of Chudangagada was a devout worshipper of Lord Lingaraja. He used to visit Lingaraja every day. Since it was not possible to commute to Lingaraja during the rainy seasons the lord advised him in a dream to construct a temple in the centre of a neighboring lotus pond where the lord himself dwells as a Jalasayi. The King complied with the desire of the lord by constructing the present temple, which is located on the western embankment of the Jalesvara pond. To conduct the rituals and other associated activities of the temple the King gave land grants to the Brahmins of Rahanga sasan and other Sevayatas. Hence the place is known as Kalarahanga.

== Significance ==
According to local tradition, the temple was built by Padma Keshari, one of the Keshari (Somavamsi) rulers, which however does not conform to the genealogical table of the Somavamsis. Rituals like Siva Vivaha, Sivaratri, Janmastami, Dola Purnima, Sitalasasthi, Chandana Yatra, Pindadana and Dhanu Makara are observed. Various social functions like marriage ceremony, thread ceremony, mundanakriya and engagement are performed.

== Physical description ==
A massive compound wall in all the four sides surrounds the temple. Beyond the compound wall Jalesvara pond in the east, paddy fields in the north and south sides and the approaching road in the western side. The adjoining depressions in the paddy fields indicate that originally the temple was surrounded by water on all the four sides which is attested by the local legend.

== Architectural features (plan and elevation) ==
The temple has a vimana, an antarala, a jagamohana and at a short distance a nata-mandira. The vimana measures 5.40 square meters, antarala 1.30 meters and the jagamohana 9.00 square meters extending the projections of the balustraded window. On elevation, the vimana is of rekha order having usual bada, gandi and mastaka measuring 12.35 metres from khura to kalasa. The bada of the vimana measuring 2.87 metres in height has five vertical divisions of pabhaga (0.87 metres) with of five mouldings, tala jangha (0.50 metres), bandhana (0.10 metres) upara jangha (0.80 metres) and baranda (0.60 metres) with three thin mouldings. A thick bada moulding measuring 0.15 metres in thick runs around the vimana above the baranda separating the bada from the gandi. The curvilinear gandi of the vimana measuring 6.48 metres in height is distinguished by a central raha and a pair of anuratha and kanika pagas on either sides of the raha. The mastaka measuring 3.00 metres has as usual beki, amlaka, khapuri and kalasa. The gandi is otherwise devoid of ornamentation. Above the antarala is a sukanasa designed after a khakhara-mundi, which is flanked by two miniature rekha deuls. Above it there is a stylized chaitya motif flanked by two conches and crowned by a kirtimukha which is surmounted by a gajakranta. Above the gajakranta is a Hanumana in flying posture and carrying a hillock in his right hand. The base of the gandi is decorated with a series of miniature rekha deul as angasikharas on the pagas arranged in descending order from raha to the kanika paga as noticed in Subarnesvara. The gandi is also devoid of ornamentation. The jagamohana of the temple appears to be a later construction like the Parsuramesvara because the first and the last grahas are concealed by the back wall of the jagamohana. On elevation, the jagamohana is a pidha deul having usual bada, gandi and mastaka measuring 7.35 metres from khura to kalasa. The bada measuring 3.00 metres in height has three vertical divisions of pabhaga (0.90 metres) consisting of five mouldings (khura, kumbha, pata, kani and basanta) of conventional designs mostly devoid of ornamental detail as in the vimana jangha (0.150 metres) and baranda 0.60 metres. The bhadra deul gandi, measuring 2.05 metres in height, is designed with five receding tiers. The mastaka, measuring 2.30 metres in height, has components like beki, amlaka, ghanta, khapuri and kalasa.

iv) Raha niche and Parsvadevata: The raha niches on three sides of north, south and east uniformly measuring 1.08 metres x 0.56 metres with a depth of 0.40 metres enshrined Ganesa in the south, Kartikeya in the east and Mahisasuramardini in the north. Beneath the niche is the tala garvika designed with khakharamundis while above the niche is an urdhva-garvika, with two pilasters carved with kirtimukhas on either side of raha niches as usual in the 10th–11th-century temples of Orissa. The northern niche is enshrining a Mahisasuramardini image rather than Parvati is a departure of the standard parsvadevata arrangement. Mahisasuramardini is ten-armed; most of the arms and attributes are now damaged. The demon is in human form attempting to escape from the decapitated carcass of the buffalo. The demon is depicted in a running stance, moving from right to left. Two demons, Sumbha and Nisumbha, are addorsed (back to back) on the pedestal, depicted in running pose with weapons in their uplifted hands. Two Katyayanis holding daggers are delineated behind these demons. Ganesa in the southern niche with four arms is standing in tribhanga pose over a lotus pedestal. His lower left arm is resting over the shaft of a Parasu and his lower right arm is holding an akhya mala (rosary). While his upper left arm is holding a modaka patra the upper right arm is holding a broken tooth (tusk). The image is crowned by jatamukuta and flanked by flying Vidyadharas. The whole image stands in front of a makara Torana. The mouse mount is there in the pedestal. The eastern niche enshrines a four-armed Kartikeya image standing in tribhanga over a decorated pedestal. He is holding a cock in his upper left arm and spear in his lower left arm. While his lower right arm is resting over the beak of the peacock, the upper right arm is broken.

v) Decorative features:

=== Vimana ===
The bada of the vimana is a store house of sculptural embellishments. The arrangements of the mundis on the jangha are unique. The tala jangha has pidha mundi in the anuratha paga and khakhara mundi in the kanika paga and the upara jangha is decorated with a vajra-mundi above the cult-niche. This kind of arrangement of the three types of architectural motifs is the only of its kind in the temples of Bhubaneswar and rare in the state. The conjunction of anuratha and kanika paga in tala jangha is decorated with naganagi stambhas in which naga and nagi are carved in either ends, which is surmounted by an atlantid-gana. The conjunction of anuratha and raha paga in the tala jangha is filled with vyalas. The upara jangha bears figures of saptamatrikas, mithunas and alasa kanyas. The roof of the raha niche is relieved with a pidha niche that houses a deity and flanked by two rekha anga sikharas on either sides. The antarala wall is carved with khakhara-mundi and Saivite cult icons such as Kartikeya in the north and bull in the south.

=== Jaga mohan ===
The jaga mohan has two balustered windows on the northern and southern walls that project forth the square plan of the jaga mohan. The tala garvika beneath the windows have decorations of khakhara-mundis. The balusters of the windows were originally carved with female figures altering with pillars. At present most of the original decoration is missing as it is renovated with plain stone blocks. The jangha is decorated with elongated khakhara mundis crowned by kalasa that is flanked by a pair of jagrata motifs. The niches of the khakhara mundi house various cult icons, which have largely been eroded. The interior of the jagamohana measuring 3.15 square metres has a decorated ceiling designed with a large circular lotus of radiating petals and a pendant hanging at the centre. There is also a small lotus-medal simha in the ceiling of the balustered windows and ardhamandapa. Due to weathering and erosion, the images of the subsidiary niches of the vimana and jagamohana are eroded beyond recognition. T. E. Donaldson mentioned (Hindu Temple Art of Orissa, vol. 1, pp. 380–381), that dikpalas, saptamatrikas and different forms of Brahminical images and Saivite images are situated in their respective positions. The dikpalas are placed in the jangha niches of kanika paga of both vimana and jagamohana, though many of them are badly damaged. They all stand in tribhanga pose with their diminutive mounts. The lower jangha niche of the anuratha paga of both vimana and jagamohana are filled with various Bramhinical deities, primarily Saivite though many are difficult to be identified due to the ruinous conditions. The saptamatrikas along with Virabhadra and Ganesa occupy the upara jangha niches. The series begins with Virabhadra in the northern niche on the east side and continues with Brahmi (east raha, missing), Sivani (south niche, east side, missing), Kaumari (east niche, south side), Vaisnavi (south raha), Indrani (west niche, south side), Varahi (west niche, north side), Camunda (north raha, missing) and Ganesa (east niche, north side). The matrikas are seated in lalitasana with a child on their left lap.

=== Doorjambs ===
The doorjambs of the vimana, measuring 1.90 metres in height and 0.96 metres in width, are carved with four vertical bands of patra sakha, puspa sakha, nara sakha and lata sakha from exterior to interior with a naga border in the inner sakha (lata sakha). A diminutive naga in left and nagi in right are in anjali mudra on either side of the entrance portal right above the dvarapala niche. At the base of the doorjambs there are dvarapala niches measuring 0.40 metres in height and 0.20 metres in width that house Saivite dvarapalas holding trident in there right hands being accompanied with river goddess standing on their respective mounts on either side of the dvarapalas. A parasol is held above the head of the river goddess without attendant figures. Beneath the dvarapala niche are three diminutive figures facing the doors rather than the simha motifs on either side of chandrasila. The door frame of the jagamohana is similar in design with the vimana. The dvarapalas assume a tribhanga pose and hold tridents in their left hands, with the weapon cutting diagonally across the body. Right hands are uplifted. The lalatabimba houses images of Saraswati and Ganesa within a pidha mundi niche. It is a deviation from the standard Gajalaxmi motif of the Orissan temple. Saraswati holds the Vina with her major hands while her upper right arm holds a lotus, the lower left is placed on the thigh holding a book. Ganesa holds the standard four objects in his hands. The Chandrasila is decorated with five mouldings with three atlantid-ganas. There are naga-nagi column in ascending order measuring 1.50 metres in height holding garland in their both hands and beneath the column is carved with a pair of Gajakrantas like the entrance portal of the Meghesvara temple.

=== Lintel ===
The graha architrave of the vimana above the door frames is carved with the navagrahas, each within a niche and seated in padmasana. Due to the later addition of the jagamohana first and last grahas are concealed and at present only seven grahas are visible. The graha architrave of the jagamohana measuring 1.84 metres in length is also carved with the traditional navagrahas as usual in Orissan temples.

The jangha portion is profusely carved with pidha mundi, khakhara mundi, rekha mundi and vajra mundi. Kalasa of Vimana and Jagamohana is made of chlorite stone. Ganesa and Saraswati in the lalatabimba of jagamohana. Balustraded windows in the Jagamohana.

== Condition description ==
i) Signs of distress: Cracks are noticed in the vimana and jagamohana.

ii) Repairs and Maintenance: It was repaired by Orissa State Archaeology under X and XI Finance Commission Award.

4. Detached sculpture: There are some detached sculptures kept near the southern wall of the Mandapa. The bigger one is a carved slab of makara Torana flanked by flying Vidyadharas. At the base of the Torana Visnu is standing over a lotus pedestal. The head is broken. He is wearing Kirita mukuta, wearing a garland, sacred thread and manibandhana and his two hands are broken. At the base of the Torana on either side there are two female figures holding lotus in their left hands. They are crowned with kirita mukuta in either side.

(1) gaja vyala

(2) female figure with simha head

(3) female figure on lotus pedestal

(4) male dancing figure

(5) female drummer

(6) five bulls

(7) gajakranta

(8) amorous couple

(9) two nayikas

(10) Salabhanjika

== See also ==
- List of temples in Bhubaneswar
