= Pabaneswara Temple =

Pabaneswara temple
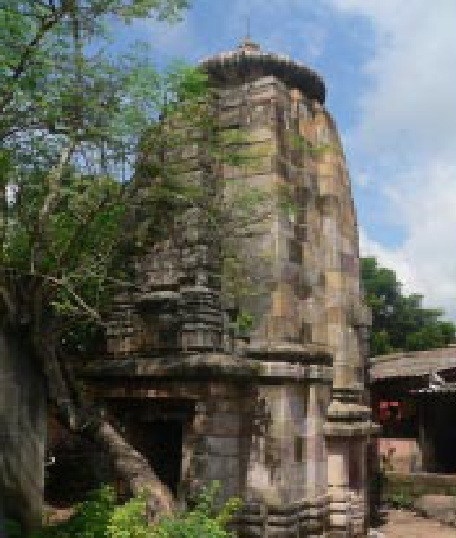

- Location in Odisha

Religion
- Affiliation: Hinduism
- District: Khurda
- Deity: Lord Shiva

Location
- Location: Bhubaneswar
- State: Odisha
- Country: India
- Coordinates: 20°14′59″N 85°50′34″E

Architecture
- Type: Kalingan Style (Kalinga Architecture)
- Completed: 10th century A.D.
- Elevation: 16 m (52 ft)

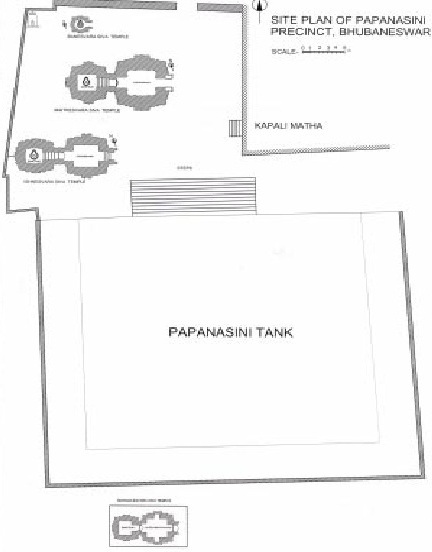
Plan of the temple

Pabaneswara Shiva temple is situated in Bhubaneswar, Orissa, India, at a distance of 100 metres east of Parashurameshvara Temple on the left side of the road leading to Kedara Gauri temple. The temple has a vimana with a renovated porch, facing towards east. The presiding deity is a Shiva linga within a circular yonipitha inside the sanctum. The temple is surrounded by private residential buildings and market complex on three sides and the road on the south. The temple was rebuilt or renovated sometimes back as it appears from the second phase of building from above the pabhaga.

== History ==
Previously known as Daitesvara Shiva temple, the Pabaneswara Shiva temple dates back to the 10th century and houses a Shiva Linga. Apart from this, the temple's history remains unknown.

== Architecture and features ==
Pabaneswara Shiva temple is built in an architectural style known as Kalingan Rekha. It is a single structure made of grey sandstone. The temple faces east surrounded by private residential buildings and a market complex on three sides.

The entire temple is renovated. On plan, the temple has a vimana with a renovated frontal porch measuring 3.80 in length and 0.75 in breadth. The temple stands on a low platform which is now buried. The vimana is ancharatha on plan as distinguished by a central raha a pair of anuratha pagas and kanika agas on the either side of the raha. n elevation, the temple has a trianga bada measuring 2.90 metres in height. Pabhaga measuring 0.75 metres has four moulding of khura, kumbha, pata, and basanta. The jangha hat measures 1.65 metres is plain and the baranda is 0.50 metres. The temple is devoid of any culptural embellishment. The mastaka of the temple conforms to the typical Kalingan style hat consists of beki, amlaka, khapuri and kalasa. Raha niche & parsva devatas: The raha niches on three sides uniformly measures 0.80 metres in height x 0.45 metres in width x 0.25 metres in depth, are all empty.

=== Decorative features ===
Doorjambs: The doorjambs are decorated with a single vertical band of scroll work. At the lalatabimba there is a Gajalaxmi seated in lalitasana on a full blown lotus. At the base of the right doorjamb there is a dvarapala nich crowned by a stylized chaitya motif. The niche accommodates a saivite dvarapala that holds a trident. The left jamb is a piece of renovated stone which is plain. Beneath the chandrasila there are bharabahakas. Above the door there is a graha architrave carved with the traditional navagrahas seated in padmasana. Ketu is with a serpent tail and upraised hands.

== See also ==
- List of temples in Bhubaneswar
