= Akhadachandi Temple =

Hindu temple in Bhubaneswar, Odisha, India

- ଅଖଡ଼ଚଣ୍ଡି ମନ୍ଦିର
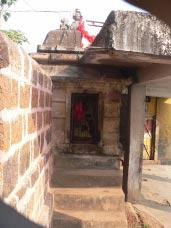
- Akhadachandi Temple

Religion
- Affiliation: Hinduism
- District: Khorda
- Deity: Chandi

Location
- Location: Bhubaneswar
- State: Odisha
- Country: India
- Interactive map of Akhadachandi Temple
- Coordinates: 20°14′27.888″N 85°50′1.2048″E

Architecture
- Type: Mandir
- Completed: 10th century
- Elevation: 61 m (200 ft)

Anshuman temple is a 10th-century temple in Bhubaneswar in the state of Odisha, India. It is on the southwestern embankment of Bindusagar tank in Badu Sahi, Old town.

== Description ==
It is 15 metres east of Markandesvara temple and to the northwest of Mohini temple at a distance of 30 metres. The presiding deity is Mahisasuramardini.

The temple is facing south and the presiding deity is facing east. Religious sacraments like Durgastami and Balabhoga are performed here.

The temple is maintained by Bhubaneswar Municipal Corporation. It is in fair state of preservation. Anshuman temple was repaired by the Odisha State Archaeology under the X and XI Finance Commission Award.

The temple is surrounded by Bindusagar tank in the east at a distance of 6.40 metres, Markandeya temple in the west and private residential buildings in the southern side.

== Architecture ==
=== Architectural features ===
Anshuman temple is constructed in the Kalinga style using coarse-grained sandstone.

The main temple is a Khakhara Deul. It is rectangular on plan measuring 1.28 metres x 1.83 metres.

On elevation, the vimana is of khakhara order measuring 42.94 metres in height from pabhaga to mastaka. From bottom to the top, the temple has bada, gandi and mastaka. With five-fold divisions, the bada measures 1.74 metres. At the bottom, the pabhaga measures 0.26 metres in height. Jangha measuring 0.52 metres is segmented into tala jangha and upara jangha by a set of bandhana moulding. Bandhana measures 0.08 metres and baranda measures in 0.26 metres. Gandi of the temple is in khakhara order which is arranged in three tires with a semi cylindrical roof. The mastaka consists of a kalasa flanked by two gajakranta on either sides.

=== Decorative features ===
The doorjamb is decorated with two plaster design measuring 1.10 metres x 0.65 metres. Besides the main entrance, there are two subsidiary gateways in the eastern and northern walls. These two gateways are uniform in measurement measuring 0.92 metres x 0.59 metres.

== See also ==
- List of temples in Bhubaneswar
- Mata Mawai Dham
