= Talesvara Siva Temple =

Hindu temple in Bhubaneswar, Odisha, India

Talesvara Siva Temple – I
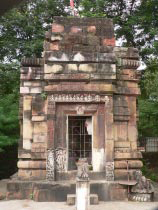

- Location in Odisha

Religion
- Affiliation: Hinduism
- Deity: lord Siva

Location
- Location: Bhubaneswar
- State: Odisha
- Country: India
- Interactive map of Talesvara Siva Temple – I
- Coordinates: 20°14′36.76″N 85°50′13.71″E

Architecture
- Type: Kalingan Style (Kalinga Architecture)
- Completed: 8th century CE
- Elevation: 22 m (72 ft)

The Talesvara Siva temple is a Hindu temple in Bhubaneswar, Odisha, India.

It is an active temple, which means people use it for worshiping purposes. Its past use could not be ascertained as it was in ruins until the recent renovation.

== Location ==
Talesvara Siva Temple – I is situated on the left side of the Kedar Gouri road leading from the Parasuramesvara temple to the Vaital temple at a distance of 60 metres. North-east of Parasuramesvara temple in Old Town, Bhubaneswar. It is 90 metres east of Kedargouri temple, 200 metres south of Anantavasudeva temple and 50 metres. west of Uttaresvara temple. The temple is facing towards east. The presiding deity is a Siva lingam with a circular Yoni pitha inside the sanctum, which is 0.20 metres below the chandrasila of the entrance doorway. The present shrine was entirely renovated in the past. The superstructure is non-existent. It is a living temple.

== History ==
The temple is owned by a single private owner and it is currently being looked after by Sri Sudarsana Panda and his family members, he lives in Kedar Gouri chowk, Old Town, Bhubaneswar.

Because of the features like the graha architrave, which is carved with eight grahas; pabhaga with three mouldings of khura, kumbha, pata, which have archaic features it is believed that it was established in the 8th century CE.

== Architecture ==
It is a REKHA DEUL type of temple building but now the superstructure has no existence.

== Significance ==
Bhauma-Kara rule is a historic significance of this temple besides this numerous cultural significance like Sivaratri, Kartika purnima and Sankranti are observed in this temple.

== Architecture ==
- Surrounding: The temple is within a compound made of dressed laterite blocks. The compound wall measures 32.00 metres in length, 16.60 metres in breadth and 2.00398 metres in height with an average thickness of 0.30 metres. While the residential buildings surround the compound wall on the east and south road passes through in the west and north. There is an ancient well made of laterite block in the southeastern corner of the temple at a distance of 6.00 metres from the vimana. The face of the well measures 2.60 square metres.
- Orientation:This temple Faces towards east.
- Architectural features (Plan and Elevation): At present, the temple stands on a low square platform measuring 3.50 square metres with a height of 0.45 metres. On plan, the temple has a vimana, measuring three square metres. The sanctum measuring 1.90 square metres, which is 0.20 metres below the present platform. The vimana is triratha on plan as distinguished by a central raha and a pair of kanika pagas on either side of the raha on all the four sides. On elevation, the temple has a renovated bada sealed by stones that measures 5.20 metres from khura moulding to the half of the gandi. From bottom to the top, the temple has a bada, while the mastaka is absent. On elevation, the bada measuring 2.20 metres has threefold division namely pabhaga (0.65 metres), jangha(1.30 metres), baranda(0.25 metres). At the base, the pabhaga has three mouldings comprising khura, kumbha, and pata, which are not a developed one. The remaining part of the reconstructed superstructure measures 3 metres.
- Raha niche & Parsva devata: The raha niche on three sides uniformly measures 0.85 metres in height, 0.45 metres in width, and 0.24 metres in depth and are occupied by smaller images of the recent times. The most attractive image in the temple is a four armed Aja-ekapada Bhairava in a subsidiary niche (measuring 0.48 metres in height, 0.2 metres in width) in the kanika paga of the northern wall. The deity is holding an arrow (?) in lower left arm and a trident in upper left arm. While his lower right arm is in varada mudra, the upper right arm holds a rosary. The trident is fixed firmly by a diminutive figure at the bottom. The deity is crowned by jatamukuta. A seated male figure in anjali mudra occupies right corner of the niche.
- Decorative features: The bada of the temple was originally carved richly with chaitya motifs and scroll works. In the pabhaga mouldings, khura is plain, kumbha is relieved with elephants, lions, and scroll works and the pata is decorated with chaitya motifs. The base of the jangha is decorated with a series of elephants and lions. The subsidiary niche is crowned by a khakhara mundi relieved by stylized bho-motif made of two chaitya motifs. In the centre of the chaitya motifs are a female figure in padmasana and a human head in succession. The baranda with a single moulding is relieved by the carvings of scroll works, recess and false perforated windows. Line drawings of the chaitya motifs and scroll work are noticed in the temple stones, which suggest that carvings in the temples are done after the structure is erected.
- Door Jamb:The doorjamb measuring 1.80 metres in height and 1.15 metres in width is decorated with scroll works. At the base of the doorjamb, there are dvarapala niches enshrining Saivite dvarapalas. The right side niche houses a four armed dvarapala that is wielded with akshyamala, lotus stalk, trident in three hands and upper right arm in varada mudra. The image wears a sacred thread, padma kundala and jatamukuta. The dvarapala is flanked by two male figures, one firmly fixing the shaft of the trident and the other seated in anjali mudra. The left jamb is a recent addition, which is plain. Beyond the dvarapala niche is the river goddess niche that houses Yamuna along with a diminutive female figure399 that holds the shaft of the parasol raised over the head of the river goddess. In the image of Ganga the upper part of the deity is missing. The river goddess pilaster is crowned by ghatapallava on the top. At the lalatabimba Gaja-lakxhmi seated in padmasana and flanked by two elephants on either side standing on full blown lotus. Her right arm holds a lotus stalk and left arm is in the varada mudra.
- LINTEL: The architrave above the doorjamb measuring 1.65 metres is carved with the eight grahas seated in padmasana. Ketu is absent in architrave.
- BUILDING MATERIAL: It is made up off light grey sandstone.
- CONSTRUCTION TECHNIQUES: Dry masonry.
- STYLE: kalingana.
- Special features: The graha architrave is carved with eight grahas and the lintel and jambs are profusely carved with scrollworks. However line drawing of various motifs on architectural members suggest that the temple was not complete.

== Conservation ==
After renovation temple is in a good state of preservation except for the cracks in the roof leaking rain water into the sanctum.

Condition description:

- Signs of distress: Growth of the vegetation on the structure and water seepage into the sanctum from the roof
- Structural problems: The superstructure above the bada needs to be properly sealed.
- Repairs and Maintenance: Orissa State Archaeology repaired this temple during the X & XI Finance Commission Award.

Threats to the property: The temple has collapsed; renovation has been made up to the bada portion.

- Water Activities: The water percolating into the sanctum from the roof needs to check by repairing the renovated roof.400
- Growth of Vegetation: The growth of vegetation on the structure needs to be cleared and prevented.
- Detached and loose sculptures: Three detached sculptures are kept in the left side of the vimana. One is broken amlaka, a do-pichha simha and four armed Siva holding attributes like dambru in his lower left and trident in lower right arm seating in padmasana. The other two arms are broken.

== See also ==
- List of temples in Bhubaneswar
