= Chandrasekhara Mahadeva Temple =

- Location in Odisha

Religion
- Affiliation: Hinduism
- District: Khurda
- Deity: Lord Shiva

Location
- Location: Bhubaneswar
- State: Odisha
- Country: India
- Interactive map of Chandrasekhara Mahadeva Temple
- Coordinates: 20°20′59″N 85°50′07″E

Architecture
- Type: Kalingan Style (Kalinga Architecture)
- Completed: 19th century A.D.

Chandrasekhara Mahadeva Temple is a Hindu temple dedicated to Lord Shiva located in the village Patia, Bhubaneswar, Odisha, India. The enshrined deity is a Shiva lingam within a circular yoni pitha. The temple has a private ownership but is held by many people at the same time.

== The Temple ==
The temple dates back to approximately 19th century A.D. This is inferred from the architectural features and building materials. The temple has a lot of cultural significance attached to it. Rituals like Badaosa and Sankranti are observed here. The Patia Grama Mangali Trust Board is also associated with this temple.

=== Surrounding ===
The temple is surrounded by residential buildings in north and south, pasture land in west and a concrete hall in the east.

=== Architectural features ===
The temple has a vimana and a cement concrete hall in front of the vimana, which served as jagamohana. On elevation, the vimana is of pidha order having bada, gandi and mastaka measuring 4.80 metres in height from bottom to the top. The bada of the temple measures 1.75 metres in height. The gandi measures 1.55 metres and the mastaka 1.50 metres in height. The doorjambs are a decorative element of the temple. They measure 1.20 metres x 0.51 metres. The building material is laterite. The construction technique used is Ashlar masonry with cement plaster and it has Kalingan style..

== See also ==
- List of Hindu temples in India
- List of temples in Bhubaneswar
