= Gangesvara Siva Temple =

- Location in Orissa

Religion
- Affiliation: Hinduism
- Deity: Siva lingam

Location
- Location: Bhubaneswar
- State: Orissa
- Country: India
- Coordinates: 20°14′33″N 85°51′17″E

Architecture
- Type: kalingan Kalinga Architecture
- Completed: 13th-14th century AD
- Elevation: 18 m (59 ft)

Gangesvara Siva Temple (lat. 20° 14’27" N., long. 85° 50’ 12"E., elev. 73 ft) is situated within a precinct on the left side of the Ganges–Yamuna road (leading from Talabazar Chowk to the Ganges-Yamuna temple) Old Town, Bhubaneswar, Orissa, India. It is located at a distance of 200 metres north-east of Lingaraj temple, 50 metres north of Lakhesvara temple across the road, 200 metres south of Subarnesvara and 100 metres east of Gourisankar temple. The temple is facing east. The presiding deity is a Siva lingam within a circular yonipitha. It is a living temple and is maintained by the Ganga Yamuna Sangathana.

== Legend ==
There is a common belief among the local people that Goddess Parvati killed the demons Kirti and Basa in the Ekamra Kshetra. After this heroic incident, the deity felt thirsty. In order to quench the thirst, Lord Shiva struck his trident into the earth. A spring came out and to consecrate the spring river goddess Ganga and Yamuna were invited. To commemorate the incident, the twin temples of Gangesvara and Yamunesvara were constructed during the Ganga rule in Orissa. However, the present monument is a later renovation of the original shrine as evident from the use of earlier building materials used in a non-schematic manner and the depiction of sculptures from the later period in the jangha.

== Significance ==
i) Historic significance : Local people attribute the temple to the imperial Gangas.

ii) Cultural significance : Festivals like Shivaratri, Chandana Yatra, Kartika Purnima and Jalabhiseka are performed.

iii) Social significance : Thread ceremony, Marriage ceremony, Engagements and other social functions are also performed.

iv) Associational significance :Ganga-Yamuna Sangathana

== Physical description ==
i) Surrounding: The temple is surrounded by Yamunesvaar temple in the south and the Ganges-Yamuna tank in north-east direction within the temple precinct. The eastern, western and northern sides are surrounded by paddy fields across the temple compound wall. The Ganges–Yamuna road passes through in the south beyond temple compound wall.

ii) Orientation: The temple is facing east.

iii) Architectural features (Plan & Elevation): On plan, the temple is pancharatha with square vimana and a frontal porch extending towards east. The vimana measures 3.35 square metres with the frontal porch measuring 0.25 metres. On elevation, the temple is in rekha order having usual bada, gandi and mastaka measuring 8.00 metres in height from khura to kalasa. The bada measuring 2.60 metres in height has fivefold vertical divisions namely plain pabhaga with five mouldings (0.66 metres), tala jangha (0.72 metres), bandhana two mouldings (0.40 metres), upara jangha (0.60 metres) and the baranda has a single moulding of 0.22 metres in height. The gandi above the baranda measuring 3.15 metres in height is distinguished by a central raha and a pair of anuratha and kanika pagas on either side of the raha which is a curvilinear spire devoid of ornamentation. The mastaka as usual in Orissan temples has components like beki, amlaka, khapuri and kalasa that measure 2.25 metres in height.

iv) Raha niche & Parsvadevata: The parsvadevata niche on three sides uniformly measures 0.63 metres in height and 0.33 metres in width. The western niche houses a four armed Vishnu image standing in tribhanga pose on a full-blown lotus pedestal along with his mount Garuda. The deity is holding mace in his upper left arm and conch in lower left arm. While his upper right arm is in varada mudra and the lower right arm is holding a wheel. The image wears a kirita mukuta and a Makara Torana in relief behind the head. The northern niche accommodates a four armed Parvati image of recent make. The southern niche is empty. The niches are plain.

v) Decorative features: The temple is carved with secular images on both the janghas. In the western wall, tala jangha portion there is a female figure holding a child in her both hands. The female wears a manibandha, beaded necklace and armlet with bulbing hair. The upara jangha, bears a nayika in standing pose pushing something into her genital organ in her left hand while her right hand is resting on the ground. In the kanika paga, the tala jangha has a darpana image and the upara jangha sculpture has a male figure holding a rectangular flat-shaped object in his left hand and the right hand resting over the right knee. On the right side of the raha paga, the lower jangha is carved with a male warrior who holds a sword in his right hand and a shield in left hand. In the upara jangha, there is a woman in yonibhiseka pose standing over a fire pot with splayed out legs, the figure either urinating or taking the warmth of the fire. Her right arm is in abhaya mudra and the left arm rests over her left knee.

In the kanika paga, the lower jangha bears an amorous couple in which the male figure touches the left breast of the female figure while the right hand touches the chin of the woman. In the southern wall, the left side raha (anuratha paga) in lower jangha bears a female figure holding a pot in her left hand while in her right hand she is feeding a monkey. In the upara jangha, the male figure is holding a kamandalu in his left hand while his right hand holds the arm of the female in an amorous pose. In the upara jangha there is an abduction scene in which a male with a moustache is carried by a female. The carvings in the northern wall are chopped off. On the right side the jangha is carved with a secular image of a female figure in which she is pushing something in to the genital organ in her left hand.

Doorjamb -The doorjambs measuring 1.52 metres x 1.07 metres is decorated with two plain vertical bands. At the base of the doorjambs there are two dvarapala niches measuring 0.32 metres x 0.14 metres. The dvarapalas are standing in flex position and holding a trident in their left hand. In the inner dvarasakha at the base near the pidhamundi of the niche has a snake canopy with the bust of a female on the left and a male on the right. There are gajasimha motifs carved beneath the dvarapala niches. At the lalatabimba there is a gajalaxmi seated in lalitasana on double petalled lotus flanked by two elephants which represents the jalabhiseka ceremony.

vi) Building material: Grey sandstone

vii)Construction techniques: Dry masonry

viii) Style: 'Kalingan'.

ix) Special features, if any: Carved with secular images in both the janghas

== See also ==
- List of temples in Bhubaneswar
