= Mangalesvara Siva Temple =

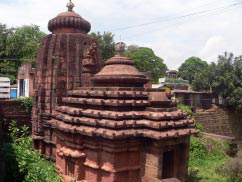

- Location in Orissa

Religion
- Affiliation: Hinduism
- Deity: lord Siva

Location
- Location: Bhubaneswar
- State: Orissa
- Country: India
- Interactive map of Mangalesvara Siva Temple
- Coordinates: 20°14′38″N 85°50′38″E

Architecture
- Type: Kalingan Style (Kalinga Architecture)
- Completed: 14th century A.D.
- Elevation: 14 m (46 ft)

Mangalesvara Siva Temple is a Hindu temple located in Bhubaneswar, Orissa, India. It is located at Lat- 20◦ 14’ 38" N., Long- 85◦ 50’ 38" E., and at an elevation of 45 ft.

== Location ==
The temple is located in the precinct of the Papanasini River and on the southern embankment. The temple faces east and the enshrined deity is a circular yonipitha. The Lingam is absent. The temple is 1.60 metres below the present street level.

Cultural functions such as Sankranti, Sivaratri and Jalabhiseka are celebrated.

== History ==
The temple is public property. Taranisen Batu is the priest of this temple and its architectural features suggest that it was built in the 14th century AD.

== Architecture ==
It is a Precinct and the typology is rekha and pidha. Earlier it was used for worshipping but now it is a living temple.

It is surrounded by Papanasini tank in north at a distance 6.70 metres, the compound wall of Papnasini tank in west and south and a shop in east.

Orientation: The temple is facing towards east

=== Measurements ===
On plan, the temple has a square vimana measuring 3.30 square metres and a square jagamohana measuring 4.50 square metres. The ganthiala measures 0.40 metres in length. The sanctum of vimana measures 1.20 square metres and that of jagamohana measures 2.50 square metres. On elevation, the vimana is of rekha order that measures 8.14 metres in height form pabhaga to mastak. The temple has a bada gandi and mastaka. With fivefold divisions of the bada of the vimana it measures 2.44 metres. At the bottom the pabhaga has five base mouldings of khura, kumbha, pata, kani and basanta that measures 0.61 metres in height, talajangha measures 0.45 metres, bandhana 0.21 metres, upara jangha 0.58 metres and baranda measures 0.59 metres. The gandi of the vimana measures 3.70 metres in height with a central raha and a pairs of anuratha and kanika pagas are either sides of raha. The mastaka of the vimana measures 2.00 metres in height. The bada of the jagamohana also has fivefold divisions measuring 2.20 metres in height. Pabhaga has five base mouldings of khura, kumbha, pata, kani and basanta measuring 0.57 metres in height, talajangha 0.53 metres, bandhana 0.13 metres, upara jangha 0.52 metres and baranda 0.45 metres. Gandi and mastaka of jagamohana measures 1.60 metres and 1.85 metres respectively. While the vimana has a curvilinear spire, the jagamohana has a pyramidal gandi has two potalas separated by a recess kanthi. The lower potala has three tiers whereas the upper potalahas two tiers. There are two balustraded windows in the bada of northern and southern walls of jagamohana.

Raha niche & parsva devatas: The parsvadevata niches are located on the raha paga of the talajangha on the three sides of north, west and south measure 0.60 metres in height x 0.30 metres in width x 0.15 metres in depth. All are empty.

=== Decorative features ===
The doorjambs have three plain vertical bands that measures 1.60 metres in height x 1.28 metres in width. At the base of the doorjambs there are dvarapala niches with pidhamundis measures 0.22 metres in height x 0.11 metres in width holds tridents. At the lalatbimba Laxmi is in Padmasana holding lotus in her both hands. The doorjamb of Jagamohana measures 1.63 metres x 1.12 metres. It has three plain vertical bands in each side and at the base of the doorjamb there are Saivite dvarapalas. The dvarapala niches measuring 0.20 metres in height x 0.10 metres in width. The dvarapalas hold trident in their left hand and their right hand is in varada mudra. At the lalatabimba Laxmi is seated in Padmasana and the deity holds lotus in her both hands.

On the architrave above the doorjambs is a carved navagraha panel in which Ravi holds a lotus in his hands. Rahu holds a bow or half moon in his hands. Ketu is portrayed with a serpent tail.

- Building material: Laterite.
- Construction techniques: Dry masonry
- Style: Kalingan

== See also ==
- List of temples in Bhubaneswar
