= Vishnu Temple, Bhubaneswar =

- Location within Odisha

Religion
- Affiliation: Hinduism
- Deity: Vishnu

Location
- Location: Bhubaneswar
- State: Odisha
- Country: India
- Coordinates: 20.292659°N 85.848353°E

Architecture
- Type: Kalinga Architecture
- Completed: 12th Century A.D.

The Vishnu Temple, Bhubaneswar is a Hindu temple to Vishnu on the eastern embankment of Bindu Sagar at Talabazar, the capital of Odisha, India.

== Bibliography ==
- Lesser Known Monuments of Bhubaneswar by Dr. Sadasiba Pradhan (ISBN 81-7375-164-1)

== See also ==
- List of temples in Bhubaneswar
