= Devasabha Temple =

- Location in Orissa

Religion
- Affiliation: Hinduism
- Deity: Mahishamardini

Location
- Location: Bhubaneswar
- State: Orissa
- Country: India
- Interactive map of Devasabha Temple
- Coordinates: 20°14′15″N 85°50′7″E

Architecture
- Type: Kalingan
- Completed: 18th century A.D.
- Elevation: 26 m (85 ft)

Devasabha Temple is located in the Kharakhia Vaidyanath temple precinct, Old Town area of Bhubaneswar, Orissa, India. This is an abandoned temple and is facing towards the east. There is no deity inside the cellar. As per the locals, the temple is the assembly of all gods and goddess for which it is known as Devasabha.

== Architecture ==
The temple is dated back to 14th century A.D with Rekha deul topology. It is in the southwest corner of Kharakhia Vaidyanatha precinct; 5.00 metres from the southern and western compound wall. The temple is facing east. It stands on a low and square platform measuring 5.50 square metres with a height of 0.60 metres.

On plan, Devasabha Temple has a square sanctum measuring 4.00 metres with a frontal porch of 0.90 metres. It is pancharatha as distinguished by a central raha and pair of anuratha and kanika pagas on either sides of the raha. On elevation, the vimana is of Rekha order that measures 5.73 metres in height from pabhaga to mastaka. From bottom to the top Devasabha Temple has a bada, gandi and mastaka. With fivefold divisions of the bada the temple has a panchanga bada measuring 2.43 metres in height. At the bottom the pabhaga has four base mouldings of khura, kumbha, pata and basanta that measures 0.58 metres; tala jangha and upara jangha measures 0.50 metres and 0.53 metres in height respectively, separated by a three moulded bandhana measuring 0.25 metres in height. The baranda measuring 0.57 metres have five mouldings. The gandi and mastaka measures 2.25 metres and 1.05 metres in height and is devoid of sculptural embellishments.

=== Raha niche and parsva devatas ===
The Parsvadevata niches are located in the talajangha of raha pagas on the three sides, i.e., west, north and south that measures 0.76 metres in height x 0.55 metres in width x 0.20 metres in depth. The doorjamb measuring 1.79 metres in height and 1.20 metres in width has two plain vertical bands. The right side doorjamb is partially broken.

== See also ==
- List of temples in Bhubaneswar
