= Labesvara Siva Temple =

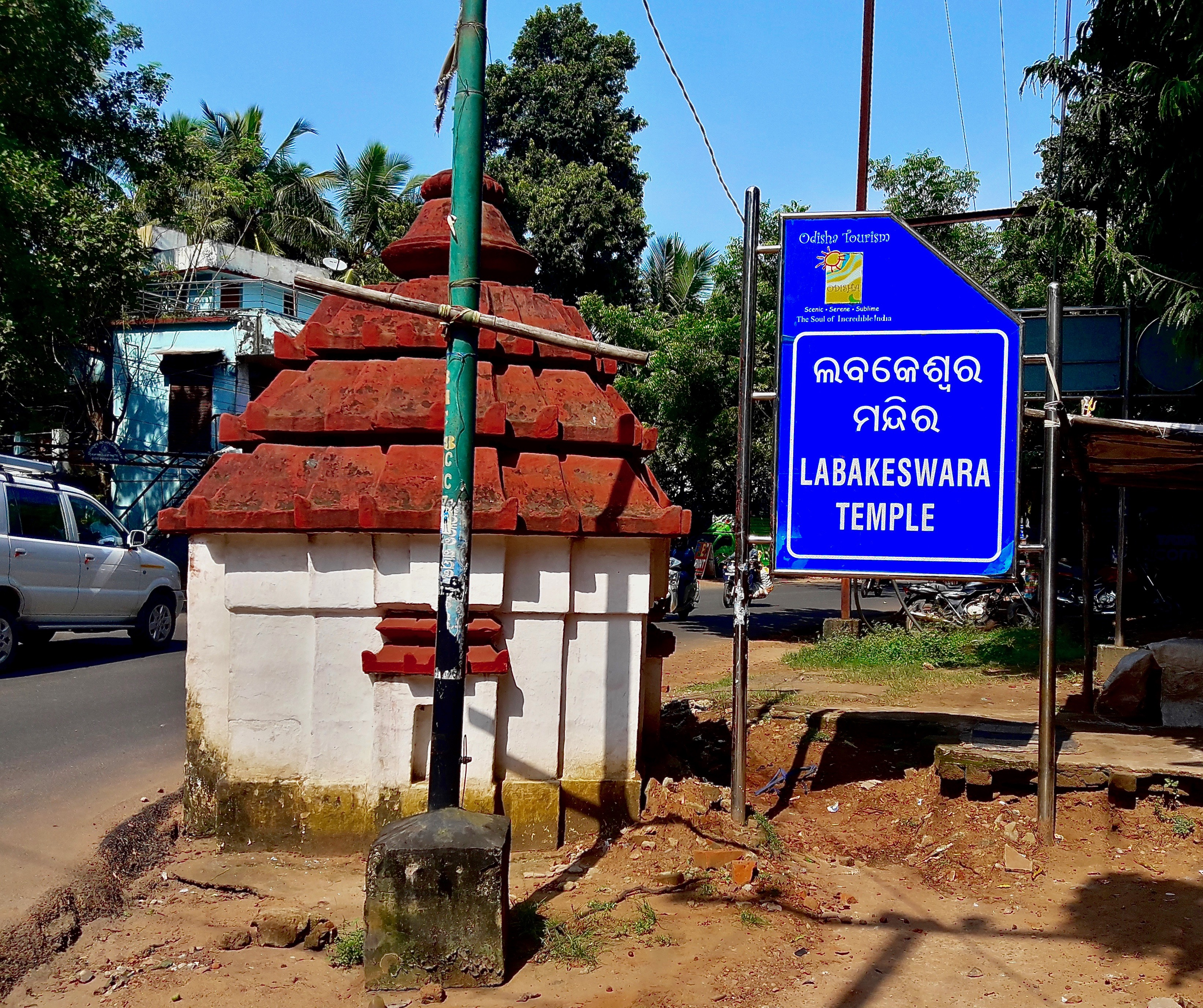

- Location in Orissa

Religion
- Affiliation: Hinduism
- Deity: Siva

Location
- Location: Bhubaneswar
- State: Orissa
- Country: India
- Interactive map of Labesvara Siva Temple
- Coordinates: 20°15′22″N 85°50′18″E

Architecture
- Type: Kalingan Style (Kalinga Architecture)
- Completed: 15th century A.D.
- Elevation: 26 m (85 ft)

Labesvara Siva Temple (Hanumantesvara) is a Hindu temple situated near Bhubaneswar, Odisha, India. The sandstone temple shows signs of deterioration, including cracks in the roof through which rain water percolates into the sanctum.

== See also ==
- List of temples in Bhubaneswar
- List of Hindu temples in India: Orissa

== Reference notes ==
- Lesser Known Monuments of Bhubaneswar by Dr. Sadasiba Pradhan (ISBN 81-7375-164-1).
- https://web.archive.org/web/20121009190909/http://ignca.nic.in/asi_reports/
