= Bhrukutesvar Siva Temple =

Bhrukuteswar Shiva Temple
- Location in Odisha

Religion
- Affiliation: Hinduism
- Deity: Shiva; Bhuvaneshvari(consort)

Location
- Location: Bhubaneshwar
- State: Odisha
- Country: India
- Coordinates: 20°14′18″N 85°50′01″E

Architecture
- Type: Kalingan Pancharatha Style (Kalinga Architecture)
- Creator: Jajati Keshari
- Completed: 13th century C.E.

Bhrukuteswar Shiva Temple is situated in Yamesvara Patna, Old Town, Bhubaneswar in Odisha, India. It is a single structure pidha deul without any frontal porch. According to the local people, this temple was built by the Kesaris (Somavamsis).

== Location ==
i) Address & ii) Approach: Bhrukutesvar Shiva Temple is situated in Yamesvara Patna, Old Town, Bhubaneswar. It is located in the right side of Badheibank Chowk on the road leading form Lingaraja temple to Yamesvara Temple. The temple is at a distance of 40 metres (130 ft) west of Talesvara temple across the compound wall, 30 metres (98 ft) north-west of Yamesvara temple and 30 metres (98 ft) east of Bakresvara temple. The temple is facing towards north. It is a single structure pidha deul without any frontal porch. The enshrined deity is a Shiva linga in with a circular yonipitha.

== Ownership ==
i) Single/ Multiple Multiple ii) Public/ Private: Public iii) Any other (specify) Since it is a living temple, the local people look after the monument.

== Age ==
i) Precise date: Late 13th Century. ii) Approximate date: Ganga period

== Property Type ==
i) Precinct/ Building/ Structure/Landscape/Site/Tank: Structure ii) Subtype: Temple iii) Typology: Pidha deul

== Physical description ==
i) Surrounding : Compound wall in south, east and west and an ancient well in north.

ii) Orientation: The temple is facing towards north.

iii) Architectural features (Plan and Elevation): On plan, the temple has a square vimana. On elevation, the vimana is a pidha deul measuring 5.03 m in height. With threefold division of bada the temple measures 2.03 m in height. The gandi has three receding tiers that measures 3.00 m in height and the mastaka has collapsed.

iv) Raha niche & parsva devatas: — 53

v) Decorative features: — Doorjambs: The doorjambs measuring 1.70 m in height and 0.70 m in width are plain. Lintel: —

vi) Building material: Laterite.

vii) Construction techniques: Dry masonry

viii) Style: Kalingan

== See also ==
- List of temples in Bhubaneswar
