= Nagesvara Temple, Bhubaneswar =

Nagesvara Temple
- Location in Orissa

Religion
- Affiliation: Hinduism
- Deity: lord Shiva

Location
- Location: Bhubaneswar
- State: Orissa
- Country: India
- Interactive map of Nagesvara Temple
- Coordinates: 20°14′47″N 85°51′24″E

Architecture
- Type: Kalingan Style (Kalinga Architecture)
- Elevation: 8 m (26 ft)

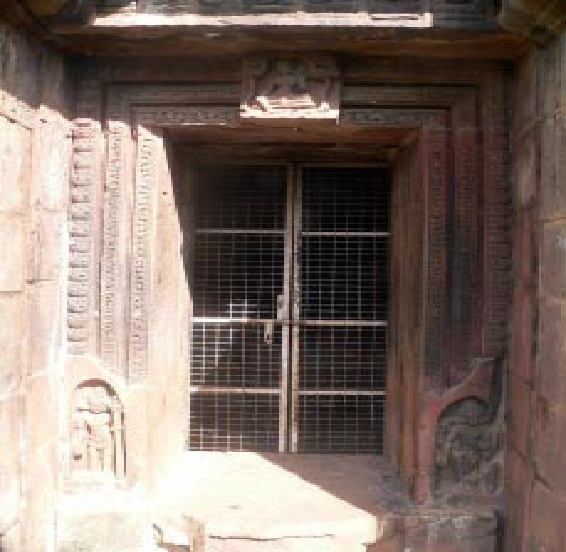
Inner Doorway

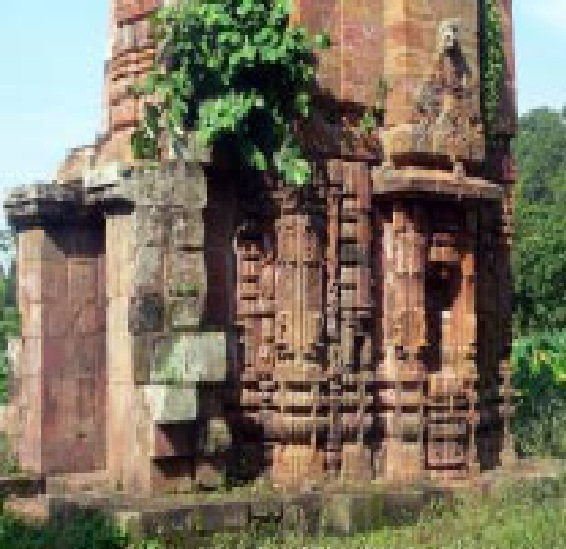
Side view

Nagesvara Temple is a functioning Hindu temple located in the village of Bhubaneswar, Odisha, India. It is situated on the western right bank of the Lingaraja West Canal at a distance of 10.35 metres (34.0 ft) west of Subarnesvara Siva Temple, located across the canal.

== Description ==
Nagesvara Temple is located in the midst of a residential area within the city of Bhubaneswar which is the capital of the state of Odisha in India. It stands facing West on a platform that is 5.6 metres (18 ft) wide by 5.0 metres (16.4 ft) deep by 0.4 metres (1.3 ft) high. The temple itself rises to a height of 8.15 metres (26.7 ft).

The garbha griha of the temple is established with a Shivling of approximately 2.5 feet height and 1.5 feet diameter. The sculptural embellishments on the outer wall of the temple contain Parvati to the North, Kartikeya to the East and Ganesha to the South, the family members of lord Siva.

The temple incorporates numerous niches for statuary, in addition to the ones for Parvati, Kartikeya and Ganesha. The exterior of the temple is made from ochrous sandstone (resembling the material of the Mukteshvara Temple) that is ornately carved in the style of the Kalinga Kingdom.

== History ==
Local residents believe the temple was built by the Kesharis.

== Preservation status ==
The temple today is in generally good condition, except for some surfaces that have deteriorated.

== See also ==
- List of temples in Bhubaneswar
