= Bhringesvara Siva Temple =

Bhringeswara Shiva Temple
- Location in Odisha

Religion
- Affiliation: Hinduism
- District: Khurda
- Deity: Shiva

Location
- Location: Bhubaneshwar
- State: Odisha
- Country: India
- Coordinates: 20°11′34.38″N 85°50′9.92″E

Architecture
- Completed: 8th century A.D.

The Bhringeswara Shiva temple is an 8th century Hindu temple situated on the foothills of Dhauli and the left bank of the Daya River, in the southeastern outskirts of Bhubaneswar(India) in the village Khatuapada. The temple is facing towards west and the presiding deity is a circular yoni pitha with a hole at the centre. The temple is made of light grey sandstone. The temple is renovated one from bottom to the top by employing the earlier materials. This temple is now under the protection of Odisha State Archaeology.

== Significance ==
i) Historic significance: —

ii) Cultural significance: Various rituals and festivals are observed like; Shivratri, Kartik Purnima, Raja Sankranti, Jalasaya ceremony.

iii) Social significance: Thread ceremony, mundana, marriage ceremony are performed.

iv) Associational significance: Village public meetings are held in the premises.

== Physical description ==
i) Surrounding: The temple is surrounded by the hillock of Dhauli on its eastern side. A road leading to the village on its western side in its front, and the extension of Dhauli hill on both the southern and northern sides.

ii) Orientation: The temple is facing towards west.

iii) Architectural features (Plan & Elevation): The temple stands on a high platform measuring 26.50 m in length, 22.10 m in width and 2 m in height. On plan, the temple has a square vimana and a frontal porch measuring 08.35 m in length (vimana measures 7.10 m and frontal porch is 1.25 m). The vimana has a square sanctum measuring 2 m^{2} inside the cella. The vimana is pancharatha as distinguished by a central raha and a pair of anuratha pagas and kanika paga on either side of the raha. On elevation, the vimana is of rekha order that measures 11.14 m in height. The bada of the temple measuring 4.14 m has five mouldings without any sculptural embellishment. The pabhaga measures 1.08 m, tala jangha - 0.95 m, bandhana - 0.31 m, upara jangha - 0.90 m, and baranda - 0.95 m. The pabhaga has four base mouldings of khura, kumbha, pata and basanta. The gandi measuring 4.50 m is devoid of any decoration except the Udyota simha in the raha pagas on three sides and gajakranta in the western wall. The mastaka bears beki, amlaka, khapuri, kalasa, ayudha measuring 2.50 m. in height.

iv) Raha niche & parsva devatas: The parsvadevata niches are located on the raha paga of the tala jangha on the three sides of north, west and south, each measuring 1.06 m in height, 0.57 m. in breadth and 0.39 m in depth houses the images of Ganesa in south and the image of Mahisasuramardini in the north. The niche in the south is empty. Ganesa standing in tribhanga pose over a lotus pedestal is holding rosary in his lower right hand and mace in his lower left hand. The upper two hands are broken. The image is also crowned by jatamukuta and wearing a sacred snake thread (nagopabita). Behind the head, is a trefoil chaitya motif with two attendants offering jack fruits and flying vidyadharas holding garlands in their both hands. Mahisasuramardini in the northern niche is unusual. It has taken the place of Parvati. Hence, this may be a later installation inside the niche. The demon has a buffalo head and a human body. The deity is a four armed, presses the head of the demon in her main left hand, and tramples the demon with her right leg. The image has all archaic features of an early phase, which may be assigned to the 8th century AD.

v) Decorative features Doorjamb: The doorjambs are partly renovated. It measures 2.38 m in height and 1.10 m in width. It has three vertical bands with sakhas like puspa, nara, lata from exterior to interior, each sakha measuring 0.14 m. There is a chandrasila between the doorjamb on the floor, which is decorated with beautiful conches on both the sides. At the base of the doorjamb, there are two dvarapala niches on either side measuring 0.55 m in height, 0.36 m in width and 0.10 m in depth. The niches are occupied by Saivite dvarapalas holding tridents and river goddesses - Ganga is standing in tribhangi pose on her makara mount under a parasol held by a diminutive female figure in the right niche and Yamuna in the similar fashion standing on her tortoise mount in the left niche. Lintel: The architrave above the doorjamb measuring 1.50 m is carved with the Navagrahas seated in Padmasana within a niche. Ravi is holding lotus in his both hands, Rahu has a big head crowned by a jatamukuta, holding half moon and Ketu with a serpent tail has uplifted hands and three-headed serpent canopy over the head.

== See also ==
- List of temples in Bhubaneswar
