= Sivatirtha Matha, Old Town =

Sivatirtha Matha
- Location in Odisha Sivatirtha Matha, Old Town (India)

Religion
- Affiliation: Hinduism

Location
- Location: Bhubaneswar
- State: Odisha
- Country: India
- Interactive map of Sivatirtha Matha
- Coordinates: 20°14′21.69″N 85°50′3.03″E

Architecture
- Type: Kalingan Style (Kalinga Architecture)

Sivatirtha Matha a Hindu Matha (monastery) in the outskirts of old town of Bhubaneswar, Odisha, India, and is known for Chandan Yatra and Dola purnima. Dola Purnima is celebrated in the belief that Lord Lingaraja arrives to this Matha to take pankti bhogo (community lunch) on Dola Purnima.

== Location ==
The matha faces east and is located in the Rathagada Chowk, Old Town, Bhubaneswar. One can approach this monastery on the right side of the Ratha road leading from Lingaraj temple to Mausima temple at a distance of 30 meters from the northern gateway of Lingaraja. The Endowment Commission took over the matha in 1970. The Matha belonged to Sankaracharya Sampradaya. The wooden logs used for preparing the chariot of Lord Lingaraj are consecrated here in the monastery before used by the carpenters.

== Burial temples of Sivatirtha matha ==
The temples are located within the Matha precinct in the eastern end. The matha is situated in front of the northern entrance of Lingaraj temple across the Ratha road. There are thirteen burial temples arranged in one and half rows. In the rear row there are nine temples, of which four temples from the northern side have been encroached upon by a private compound wall. The temples on the south are partially buried. Of the four temples in the front row three are buried up to the gandi while the fourth one is buried up to the bada. The burial temples are square on plan. On elevation these temples are of pidha order having bada, gandi and mastaka. The gandi of these temples have three receding tiers.

== See also ==
- List of temples in Bhubaneswar

== Bibliography ==
- Lesser Known Monuments of Bhubaneswar by Dr. Sadasiba Pradhan (ISBN 81-7375-164-1)
