= Svapnesvara Siva Temple =

Svapnesvara Siva temple
- Location in Odisha

Religion
- Affiliation: Hinduism
- Deity: Lord Shiva

Location
- Location: Bhubaneswar
- State: Odisha
- Country: India
- Interactive map of Svapnesvara Siva temple
- Coordinates: 20°14′27″N 85°50′39″E

Architecture
- Type: Kalingan Style (Kalinga Architecture)
- Elevation: 16 m (52 ft)

Svapnesvara Siva temple is in Gourinagar, Old Town, Bhubaneswar, the capital of Odisha, India. It is 200 m northeast of Purvesvara Siva temple. The temple is facing east. The 2 m^{2} sanctum is empty.

== Physical description ==
=== Surroundings ===
The temple is surrounded by private residential buildings in south and west directions at a distance of 3 m. In the east are a road and a drain in the north. The temple faces east.

=== Architectural features (plan and elevation) ===
The temple stands on a high pista decorated with three mouldings measuring 50.80 m in length x 5.75 m in width with 0.92 m in height.

On plan, the temple is pancharatha with a square vimana and a frontal porch towards east. The vimana measures 4.65 square metres and porch 0.15 m width.

On elevation, temple is in rekha order with usual bada, gandi and mastaka measuring 10.00 m from pabhaga to mastaka. The bada of the temple measures 2.85 m in height with threefold division of trianga bada. Pabhaga has five mouldings measuring 0.70 m, plain jangha measuring 1.65 m and the baranda with five moulding measured 0.50 m in height. The gandi measures 5.10 m and is plain and devoid of ornamentation except at the base which is decorated with chaitya designs.

=== Raha niche and parsva devatas ===
The parsvadevata niches on the raha paga of the jangha on the three sides of north, west and south direction measure 0.75 m in height x 0.45 m in width and 0.29 m in depth. They are empty and devoid of ornamentation.

=== Decorative features ===
- Doorjambs: The doorjambs are recent additions installed during the renovation work and are without any carving.
- Lintel: The lintel is a renovated one.

The building material used for the construction is light grey sandstone, and the construction technique is dry masonry.

The style is Kalingan. Originally the temple was constructed over a lofty pista with three mouldings.

== State of preservation ==
Svapnesvara Siva temple was repaired by Orissa State Archaeology under the X and XI Finance Commission Award. Due to the recent renovation work, the temple is in a good state of preservation. It was totally renovated from pista to kalasa.

Classification	Grade
Architecture	B
Historic	C
Associational	C
Social/Cultural	C

== Threats to the property ==
Some of the conservation problems the temple is facing is that stagnation of drain water in the northern side of the platform will weaken the foundation in the long run.

== See also ==
- List of temples in Bhubaneswar
