= Ladu Baba Temple =

Ladu baba temple
- Location in Odisha

Religion
- Affiliation: Hinduism
- Deity: Lord Shiva

Location
- Location: Nayagarh, Saranakul
- State: Odisha
- Country: India
- Interactive map of Ladu baba temple
- Coordinates: 20°14′39″N 85°50′02″E

Architecture
- Type: Kalingan Style (Kalinga Architecture)
- Completed: 13th century A.D.
- Elevation: 26 m (85 ft)

Ladu Baba Temple is a temple in Bhubaneswar, Odisha, India. It was built in the 13th century AD and was formerly known as Kainchi Temple.

== Location ==
Ladu Baba temple is located in the Uttara daraja, Badu Sahi, Old Town, Bhubaneswar. On the right side of Ratha road, leading from Lingaraj Market Complex Chowk to Badheibanka Chowk. It is 30.00 metres north of Chitrakarini temple and 70.00 metres south of Mohini temple. The temple is facing towards east. The Sanctum of the temple is empty. However, the sculptural embellishments in the outer walls suggest that the temple was originally dedicated to Lord Siva.

== Tradition & legends ==
According to the local tradition, the deity was rescued and shifted from Ravana’s Lanka to Ekamra Kshetra during the conflagration of Svarna Lanka on the eve of Rama-Ravana war.

== Physical description ==
i) Surrounding: The temple is surrounded by Uttaradaraja, Badu Sahi road in the west and private residential buildings on all other three sides. The temple is facing towards east.

ii) Architectural features (Plan and Elevation): The temple is buried up to half of the jangha except in the western side that is buried up to the pabhaga. On plan, the temple is pancharatha, having a square vimana with a frontal porch. The vimana measures 6.00 square metres and the porch is 0.50 metres. On elevation, the temple is in rekha order with usual bada, gandi and mastaka measuring 11.20 metres in height from the present base to kalasa. On elevation, the bada measuring 2.70 metres in height has five vertical division namely pabhaga (buried) plain, talajangha (0.76 metres), bandhana three mouldings (0.31 metres), upara jangha (0.73 metres) and baranda with nine mouldings (0.90 metres). The gandi above the baranda measuring 5.50 metres in height is a curvilinear spire and devoid of any decoration. At the center of the raha there are Udyota simhas. The mastaka as usual in Odia temples has components like beki, amlaka, khapuri and kalasa that measures 3.00 metres in height. The beki recess houses with beki bhairavas at the top of the raha paga and dopichha simha above the kanika pagas.

iii) Raha niche & parsva devatas: The raha niches on three sides uniformly measures 1.10 metres in height x 0.51 metres in width x 0.43 metres in depth. All are empty except the western raha niche that enshrines a four armed Ganesa image standing over a lotus pedestal. His lower left hand is resting over a parasu and lower right hand is holding an akshya mala while both the upper left and right hands are broken. The image has a jatamukuta. The trunk of the image is partly broken. There is an ornamented makara torana behind the image in the background.

== Decorative features ==
Door Jambs: The doorjambs measuring 2.00 metres in height x 1.60 metres in width are decorated with patra sakha, nara sakha and lata sakha from exterior to interior on either sides of the entrance portal. At the base of the doorjambs beneath the three sakhas there are two khakhara mundi dvarapala niches enshrining Saiva dvarapalas who hold trident, in their left hand.

Lintel: The architrave above the doorjamb measuring 2.05 metres is carved with navagrahas, each within a niche and seated in padmasana.

The temple is partly buried up to the pabhaga and jangha including the doorjambs. It is in a rapid process of decay because people use the empty sanctum as a garbage stake. Cracks are seen in the outer walls of the temple due to the growth of vegetations, which facilitates seepage of rain water into the sanctum. The temple is in a dilapidated condition. The temple was repaired by Orissa State Archaeology department.

== Threats to the property ==
Water stagnation inside the sanctum, growth of vegetations (pipal trees) in the conjunction of raha and anuratha pagas and the conjunction of kanika and anuratha paga and above the doorjambs of the eastern wall are cause of concern.

== See also ==
- List of temples in Bhubaneswar

== Reference Notes ==
- Lesser Known Monuments of Bhubaneswar by Dr. Sadasiba Pradhan (ISBN 81-7375-164-1).
- https://web.archive.org/web/20121009190909/http://ignca.nic.in/asi_reports/
