= Chintamanisvara Siva Temple =

Chintamaniswar Shiva Temple
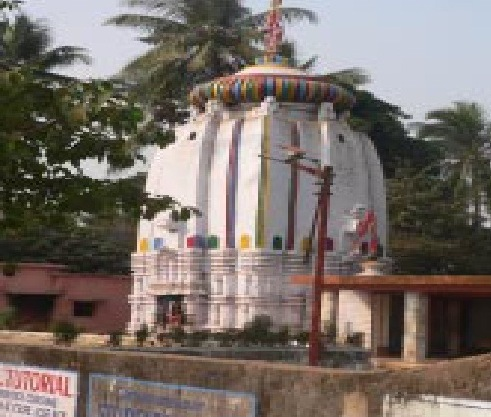

- Location in Odisha

Religion
- Affiliation: Hinduism
- Festivals: Shiva ratri, Shiva vivaha, Jalasaya, Rudrabhisekha

Location
- Location: Bhubaneswar
- State: Odisha
- Country: India
- Interactive map of Chintamaniswar Shiva Temple
- Coordinates: 20°15′00″N 85°50′20″E

Architecture
- Type: Rekha deul style
- Completed: 14th century A.D.

Chintamaniswar Shiva Temple is a Hindu temple dedicated to Lord Shiva in Bhubaneswar, the capital of Odisha, India. It is at the end of the Chintamaniswar road branching from Cuttack-Puri road near the Old Station Bazar. The temple faces west and the enshrined deity is a Siva lingam with a yonipitha.

The temple dates back to the 14th century A.D. According to local legend it was built by the Kesharis (Somavamsis). Religious sacraments like Sivaratri, Siva vivaha, jalasaya, rudrabhisekha are performed here. Marriage and thread ceremonies are held here.

== Architectural features ==
On plan, the temple has a square sanctum, the vimana is of rekha order. From bottom to the top the temple has a bada, gandi and mastaka. There are fivefold divisions the panchanga bada and at the base the pabhaga has a set of five mouldings, i.e., khura, kumbha, pata, kani and basanta.

The khura portion of the temple has partly been buried. Jangha is segmented into tala jangha and upara jangha by a set of three mouldings of the bandhana, baranda with seven mouldings. The gandi is devoid of any decoration and the mastaka as with Odia temples has components like beki, amalaka, khapuri and kalasa.

The eastern niche enshrines a four-armed Kartikeya image. His major left is in varadamudra and his right hand holds a mace. His uplifted back left hand holds a cock and his right hand is held over the head of the peacock. The southern niche houses a four-armed Ganesha image who is holding a rosary in his major right hand and modaka patra in his left hand. His uplifted back right hand holds an ankusa while his left hand holds a broken tooth (tusk). The northern raha niche houses goddess Parvati.

== Decorative features ==
The tala jangha and the upara jangha of the bada are carved with a series of khakhara mundis and pidha mundis respectively. In the beki recess above the kanika paga there is a deula charini whereas above the raha paga at the center there are four armed divinities. The base of the doorjamb is carved with two khakhara mundis on either side.

The temple is enclosed by a modern compound wall measuring 40 square m, 1.80 m in height with a thickness of 0.20 m. There is a four-armed Ganesha in the right side of the doorjamb. The deity is holding a Parasu and rosary in his lower left and right arms and modakapatra in upper left and a broken tooth (tusk) in lower left arm.

== Chintamaniswar Tank ==
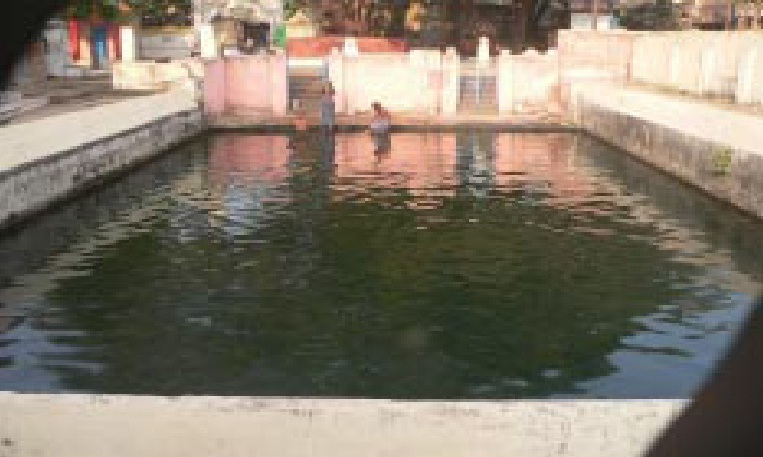
Chintamaniswar Tank

A temple tank is in the precincts. According to local people, the tank was dug by the Kesharis. Festivals like Kartika purnima and Sravana purnima are observed here.

The tank is rectangular in shape, made of laterite measuring 22.40 m in length and 11.20 m in breadth with a depth of 3.0 m. The tank is fed by a natural spring with waters from underground. As a result of this, water level is constant throughout the year. There is an outlet in the eastern wall to discharge excess water.

== See also ==
- List of temples in Bhubaneswar

== Reference notes ==
- K.C. Panigrahi, Archaeological Remains at Bhubaneswar, Calcutta, 1961. P. 16.
- Lesser Known Monuments of Bhubaneswar by Dr. Sadasiba Pradhan (ISBN 81-7375-164-1)
