= Aisanyesvara Siva Temple =

Hindu temple in Bhubaneswar, Odisha, India

- ଐଶାଣେଶ୍ଵର ଶିବ ମନ୍ଦିର
- Location in Odisha Aisanyesvara Siva Temple (India)

Religion
- Affiliation: Hinduism
- Deity: Aisanyesvara(Siva)

Location
- Location: Bhubaneswar
- State: Odisha
- Country: India
- Coordinates: 20°14′N 85°49′E

Architecture
- Type: Kalinga architecture
- Completed: 13th century A.D.

Aisanyesvara Siva Temple is a 13th-century Hindu temple dedicated to Shiva located in Bhubaneswar, the capital of Odisha, India. The temple is in the precinct of Municipal Corporation Hospital, Sriram Nagar, Old Town, Bhubaneswar. It is close to the western compound wall of Lingaraj Temple. This is a living temple and with a shrine facing east.

The enshrined deity is a Sivalingam within a circular yonipitha (basement). Rituals like Sivarathri, Jalabhiseka, Rudrabhiseka, Sankranthi are observed here. The festival deity of Lord Lingaraja is brought to this temple after the 6th day of Sivaratri.

== History ==
Architectural features like Saptaratha (seven chariots) plan that bears close resemblance with Megheswar Temple suggests that Aisanyesvara Siva Temple was built in the 13th century AD. Other architectural features suggests that it was built by Gangas.

== Architecture ==
The temple is constructed in the Kalinga architecture style using grey sandstone. Tala jangha and upara jangha are decorated with khakhara mundi and pidha mundi respectively. The pista has three mouldings, which is decorated with series of khakhara mundi. The anuratha paga(main portion) has series of khakhara mundis in succession, lotus cup in anuraha paga and 10 bhumi amlas in the kanika pagas. Two udyota lions are noticed in the gandi of rahapaga. At the base of the gandi in the frontal wall there is a miniature rekha angasikhara.

The doorjambs are decorated with three vertical bands of puspa sakha, patra sakha and lata sakha from exterior to interior. At the base of the doorjambs there are khakhara mundis on either sides. The deity of Lalatabimba Gajalaxmi is seated in lalitasana. In the architrave right above the jamb there is a navagraha panel, each graha within a niche. Surya (Sun god) holds lotus in his hands. Ketu (serpent god) is in serpent tail and holds bow in his left and a shield in the right hand. The temple is maintained by Bhubaneswar Municipal Corporation. Aisanyesvara Siva Temple is in good state of preservation.

== See also ==
- List of temples in Bhubaneswar
