= Dishisvara Siva Temple =

Hindu temple in Bhubaneswar, Orissa, India

Dishiswara Shiva Temple
- Location in Odisha

Religion
- Affiliation: Hinduism
- District: Khurda
- Deity: Lord Shiva

Location
- Location: Bhubaneswar
- State: Odisha
- Country: India
- Interactive map of Dishiswara Shiva Temple
- Coordinates: 20.1464°N 85.5029°E

Architecture
- Type: Kalingan Style (Kalinga Architecture)
- Completed: 15th century A.D.

Dishiswar Shiva Temple is located in Bhubaneswar, Orissa, India. The presiding deity is a Shiva-lingam within a circular yoni pitha installed inside the sanctum.

== Description ==
This 15th-century, privately owned temple is situated within a private compound surrounded by private residential buildings on three sides of east, west, south and the road on the north.

Laterite has been used as the building material with the dry masonry construction technique and the kalingan style.

== Present state ==
The temple is in a dilapidated state, due to the growth of vegetation all over the superstructure and the surrounding area. Cracks are noticeable in the roof and in the conjunction of the pagas. The temple was repaired by State Archaeology during X and XI Finance Commission Award.

== See also ==
- List of temples in Bhubaneswar
