= Sukutesvara Temple =

Sukutesvara temple
- Location in Orissa

Religion
- Affiliation: Hinduism
- Deity: lord lingaraja

Location
- Location: Bhubaneswar
- State: Orissa
- Country: India
- Interactive map of Sukutesvara temple
- Coordinates: 20°14′27″N 85°50′12″E

Architecture
- Type: Kalingan Style (Kalinga Architecture)
- Elevation: 22 m (72 ft)

Sukutesvara Temple located in the old town of Bhubaneswar, Odisha, India, serves as purpose for community gathering. The preceding deity in this temple is a Siva- lingam (Lord Shiva) situated at the centre. The temple observes various religious sacraments like Mahasivaratri, Chandipatha and Rudrabhisekha.

== Location ==
i) Address & ii) Approach: The temple is situated behind the Lingaraja market complex, right side of the Ganges–Yamuna road branching from Gouri Sankara Temple. It is south west of the Ganges-Yamuna precinct, west of Lakshesvara. The presiding deity is a Siva-lingam at the centre of a circular yoni pitha. It is a living temple facing towards east.

== Tradition & legends ==
3. Ownership

i) Single/ Multiple: Multiple

ii) Public/ Private: Private

iii) Any other (specify): The temple is looked after by Damodar Mishra, who is the chief priest of the temple.

iv) Name: Damodar Mishra.

v) Address: Ganges-Yamuna Road, Old Town, Bhubaneswar.

== Age ==
ii) Approximate date: 16th Century A.D. iii) Source of Information: As evident from the structure, the enshrined deity and the navagraha panel.

== Property Type ==
i) Precinct/ Building/ Structure/Landscape/Site/Tank: Building

ii) Subtype: Temple

iii) Typology: Pidha deul

== Property use ==
i) Abandoned/ in use: In use

ii) Present use: Living Temple

iii) Past use: Worshipped

== Significance ==
i) Historic significance: According to local tradition the temple was constructed during the hey day of the Kesharis.

ii) Cultural significance: Various religious sacraments like Mahasivaratri, Chandipatha and Rudrabhisekha are observed here.

iii) Social significance: Thread ceremony, mundan kriya, engagements are held here.

iv) Associational significance:

== Physical description ==
i) Surrounding: The temple is surrounded by Lakhesvara temple compound wall in east, open space in west, the Ganges–Yamuna road in north and private residential buildings in south.

ii) Orientation: The temple is facing towards east.

iii) Architectural features (Plan and Elevation): On plan, the temple has a vimana and a frontal porch. The vimana measures 2.80 square metres with a frontal porch of 0.55 metres. There is a modern hall measuring 3.25 square metres for congregation in front of the temple which served as the jagamohana. It is pancharatha as distinguished by a central raha and a pair of anuratha and kanika pagas on either side of the raha. On elevation, the vimana is of pidhaorder that measures 1.57 metres in height. From bottom to the top the temple has a bada, gandi and mastaka. With the threefold divisions of bada the temple has a trianga bada measuring 1.57 metres in height. (pabhaga 0.38 metres, jangha 0.86 metres, baranda 0.33 metres). The gandi has three tiers measuring 1.50 metres in height. The mastaka as usual in Orissan temple has components like beki, amalaka, khapuri and kalasa that measures 0.90 metres in height.

== Raha niche & parsva devatas ==
The raha niches are located in the jangha of north, south and western sides and uniformly measures 0.50 metres in height x 0.46 metres in width and with a depth of 0.20 metres. The images in the niches are of recent installation.

== Decorative features: — ==
Doorjambs: The doorjambs measuring 1.10 metres in height and 0.56 metres in width are carved with single vertical band which is a renovated one. At the lalatabimba there is a Gajalaxmi image seated on a double petalled lotus, flanked by two elephants. Lintel: The architrave above the doorjamb is carved with the navagrahas all seated in padmasana.

vi) Building material: Laterite.

vii) Construction techniques: Dry masonry

viii) Style: Kalingan

ix) Special features, if any: —

== State of preservation ==
i) Good/Fair/ Showing Signs of Deterioration/Advanced: Fair, due to recent renovation work. ii) State of Decay/Danger of Disappearance: —.

== Grade (A/B/C) ==
i) Architecture: B

ii) Historic: C

iii) Associational: C

iv) Social/Cultural: C

== Threats to the property ==
Conservation Problem and Remedies: —- Compound wall: There is a compound wall made of laterite measuring 10.10 square metres and 1.43 metres in height with a thickness of 0.35 metres.

== See also ==
- List of temples in Bhubaneswar
