= Madneswar Siva Temple =

Madanesvara Siva Temple
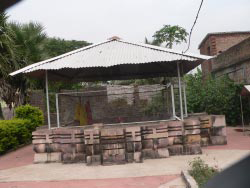

- Location in Orissa

Religion
- Affiliation: Hinduism
- Deity: lord Shiva

Location
- Location: Bhubaneswar
- State: Orissa
- Country: India
- Interactive map of Madanesvara Siva Temple
- Coordinates: 20°14′7″N 85°50′54″E

Architecture
- Type: Kalingan Style (Kalinga Architecture)
- Completed: 12th century A.D.

Madanesvara Siva Temple is a Hindu temple dedicated to Lord Siva built around 12th century CE. It is situated on the left side of the Mahavir Lane branching from Garage Chowk in Santarapur to Sisupalgarh, Bhubaneswar, Odisha, India. The enshrined deity is a Siva lingam within a circular yonipitha (basement). It is a broken shrine, and at present, only the Pabhaga portion is available.

== Architecture and structure ==
The temple is surrounded by residential buildings on three sides of north, west and east and the road in the south. The temple faces east and has a square sanctum. The superstructure has collapsed since long and the renovated pabhaga with five mouldings which include khura, kumbha, pata, kani and basanta is currently in existence.

== See also ==
- List of temples in Bhubaneswar
