= Chakreshvari Siva Temple =

Chakreswara Shiva temple
- Location in Odisha

Religion
- Affiliation: Hinduism
- District: Khurda
- Deity: Lord Shiva

Location
- Location: Bhubaneswar
- State: Odisha
- Country: India
- Interactive map of Chakreswara Shiva temple
- Coordinates: 20°14′27″N 85°50′12″E

Architecture
- Type: Kalingan Style (Kalinga Architecture)
- Completed: 10-11th century A.D.

Chakresvara Shiva temple is a living Hindu temple built in 10-11 AD dedicated to Lord Shiva at Hatiasuni lane, Rajarani Colony, Bhubaneswar of Odisha, India. The deity, lingam, is in a circular yonipitha inside the sanctum. The temple is surrounded by private residential buildings on its eastern and northern side and chakresvara tank in the west. It is of great significance as rituals like Shivaratri, Diwali, and Sankranti are observed here. Also this temple serves as a purpose of a sacred place for 'Thread Ceremony, Rudrabhiseka, Chandrabhiseka.'

== Architectural features ==
Chakresvara Shiva temple stands on a low platform.

On plan, the temple has a vimana and a renovated frontal porch. The vimana(shrine) is pancharatha and the frontal porch. On elevation, the vimana is of rekha order; it extends from pabhaga to kalasa. From bottom to the top, the temple has a bada, gandi and mastaka. With three-fold divisions of the bada, the temple has a trianga bada. At the bottom, the pabhaga has four base mouldings of khura, kumbha, pata and basanta.

== Special features ==
In the lalatabimba, a four-armed Lord Ganesha is found in place of the usual Gaja-laxmi. It is an exception of the temples of Bhubaneswar. Another departure is at Kalarahanga where the lalatabimba is occupied by images of both Ganesha and Saraswati. In front of the temple, there are images of Parvati and Kartikeya and an amlaka stone in the southern side of the temple.

== Decorative features ==
The doorjambs are decorated with three vertical bands of scroll works like puspa sakha, nara, sakha and patra sakha from exterior to interior. At the lalatabimba there is a four-armed Ganesha within a niche seated over his mount mouse.

At the base of the doorjamb, there are dvarapala niches on either sides. The niches enshrine two armed Saivite dwrapala holding tridents in their right hands and varada in left hands. The architrave above the doorjamb is beautifully carved with Navagrahas in the niches. Surya holds a lotus in his hands, Rahu holds a half moon and Ketu with a serpent tail.

== See also ==
- List of temples in Bhubaneswar
