= Sarvatresvara Siva Temple =

- Location in Orissa

Religion
- Affiliation: Hinduism
- Deity: Sarvartesvara

Location
- Location: Bhubaneswar
- State: Orissa
- Country: India
- Interactive map of Sarvatresvara Siva Temple
- Coordinates: 20°14′35″N 85°51′24″E

Architecture
- Type: Kalingan Style (Kalinga Architecture)
- Completed: 10th century AD
- Elevation: 18 m (59 ft)

Sarvatresvar Siva Temple is situated on the right side of Mahavir lane branching from Lewis road to Sisupalgarh, Bhubaneswar, Orissa, India. It enshrines a Siva-lingam within a circular yonipitha inside the sanctum. The temple precinct is located on the right bank of the stream Gangua.

== Tradition & legends ==
The name of the deity Sarvartesvara implies as the lord of all the planes.

== Ownership ==
Multiple Public/ Private: Private. The temple is looked after by Gada Mahavira Unnayana Parisada. Pratap Kumar Mohapatra is the president and Bibhuti Bhusan Dash is the secretary of the Parisada Approximate date: 10th Century A.D. (the original temple) Source of Information: Architectural features Property Type: Building Subtype: Temple Typology: Pidha deul

== Significance ==
Historic significance: According to the local legend and the Chief priest the temple was constructed by Chedi ruler Kharavela who was ruling over Kalinga in the 1st century B.C.

Cultural significance: Various religious sacraments like jagara, Raja, Sankranti are observed here.

Social significance: Marriage ceremony, thread ceremony, birthday celebration and public meetings are also held.

Associational significance: Gada Mahavira Unnayana Parishada

== Physical description ==
Surrounding: The temple is surrounded by the famous ancient fortified settlement of Sisupalgarh in the east at a distance of 100 metres, Madanesvara in the west within a distance of 1 km.

Orientation: The temple is facing towards west.

Architectural features (Plan and Elevation): On plan, the temple has a square vimana measuring 5.20 square metres with a frontal porch of 0.90 metres. The vimana is pancharatha. On elevation, the temple is in rekha order measuring 7.88 metres in height from khura to kalasa. From bottom to the top the temple has bada, gandi and mastaka. With fivefold divisions the bada of temple has a panchanga bada measuring 3.18 metres in height. At the bottom the pabhaga has a set of five mouldings of khura, kumbha, pata, kani and basanta measuring 0.80 metres. Jangha is segmented into talajangha measures 0.84 metres and upara jangha 0.80 metres separated by a set of mouldings called bandhana that measures 0.24 metres, baranda measures 0.40 metres. The gandi above the baranda measures 2.20 metres in height arranged in seven tiers in two potalas. The mastaka included beki, amalaka, khapuri and kalasa that measures 2.50 metres in height.

Raha niche & parsva devatas: The parsvadevata niches located on the raha paga of the jangha measures 0.84 metres in height x 0.34 metres in width x 0.24 metres in depth. The eastern niche enshrines a four armed Kartikeya who is holding cock in his major right and left hand is in abhaya mudra. His uplifted hand holds nagapasa in the left and arrow in the right. The northern niche enshrined a four armed image of Parvati seated on lion holding lotus in her left hand while her right hand is in abhaya mudra. In the southern niche there is a four armed Ganesa. His major left hand holds a ladu and a tooth in his other hand while the uplifted back hands hold parasu in the left and rosary in the right. He wears a jatamukuta. All the above images are of modern make.

== Decorative features ==
The temple is plain because of the cement plaster and white wash. Doorjambs: The doorjambs measure 1.95 metres in height x 0.90 metres in width. Lintel: The architrave above the doorjamb measuring 1.20 metres in length is carved with navagrahas of recent make. Building material: Grey sandstone. Construction techniques: Ashlar masonry Style: Kalingan

== State of preservation ==
Fair because of the renovation work.

== Repairs and Maintenance ==
The temple was renovated by the local people in year 1980 and now the temple is maintained by the Parisad with the Special assistance from the contractors.

== Grade (A/B/C) ==
i) Architecture: B

ii) Historic: C

iii) Associational: B

iv) Social/Cultural: C

== Detached Sculptures ==
In the precinct, there is a heap of ancient temple remains of Udyota simha, fragments of bhumiamla, carved stones, a broken sculpture of Ganesa. Subsidiary Temples: To the eastern side of the Sarbatresvara temple there is a modern concrete flat roofed temple at a distance of 0.90 metres. The temple enshrines an image of Hanumana or Mahavir. He is holding Gandhamardana in his right hand. Besides this there is a platform of an ancient shrine that measures 7.00 square metres with a height of 0.50 metres. The platform has a set of two mouldings. The temple complex is known as Gada Mahavira and it is made of laterite blocks with a distance of 7.20 metres from the vimana of Sarvatresvara temple in the south-east corner.

== See also ==
- List of temples in Bhubaneswar
