= Purvesvara Siva Temple =

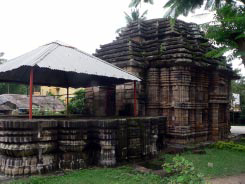

- Location in Orissa

Religion
- Affiliation: Hinduism
- Deity: Siva lingam

Location
- Location: Bhubaneswar
- State: Orissa
- Country: India
- Interactive map of Purvesvara Siva Temple
- Coordinates: 20°14′22″N 85°50′29″E

Architecture
- Type: Kalinga Architecture
- Completed: 13th-14th century AD
- Elevation: 18 m (59 ft)

Purvesvara Siva Temple is located in Kancha Sahi, in the Old Town of Bhubaneswar, Orissa, India. It was built in 13th century AD. It is a living temple and now under the care of Purvesvara Temple Development Association.

It is 300 metres east of Lingaraja temple on the left side of the road leading to Garej chowk. The temple faces west. According to local tradition, the presiding deity is known as Purvesvara, as it is situated east of Lingaraja Temple. Other temples in the three directions are Uttartesvara (north), Barunesvara (south) and Paschimesvara (west).

The enshrining deity is a broken Lingam within a circular Yonipitha at the centre of the sanctum, which is 1.07 metres below the present ground level. Vimana is not ascertained due to the absence of superstructure; jagamohana is in pidha order. It was built in the mature phase of Orissa temple building. Various rituals are observed here such as Sivaratri, Sankranti and Rudraviseka.

== Structure ==
On plan, the temple originally had a vimana and a jagamohana. The vimana is pancharatha while the jagamohana is navaratha as featured by a central raha with a pair of anuraha, anuratha, pratiratha and kanika pagas on either side of the raha of the jagamohana.

The temple is surrounded by a compound wall. The temple stands on a partially buried pista which measures 12.15 metres x 7.40 metres and is 0.25 metres in height. The superstructure of the vimana is collapsed. What exists at present is the pabhaga portion and the renovated jaga mohan. A sheet roof has been erected over the sanctum.

The temple measures 15.00 metres in length and 7.20 metres in width. The vimana and jagamohana measures 6.95 square metres and 7.20 square metres respectively. The ganthiala measures 0.85 metres in length. The cella measures 3.32 square metres. The sanctum is 1.07 metres below the present floor level of the jagamohana. The pabhaga has five base mouldings — khura, kumbha, pata, kani and basanta — measuring 1.16 metres in height.

In elevation, jagamohana is of pidha order that measures 7.00 metres. The bada measuring 3.07 metres has fivefold divisions namely pabhaga (0. 77 metres), talajangha (0.72 metres), bandhana (0.28 metres), upara jangha (0.78 metres) and baranda (0.52 metres). The bandhana has three mouldings and the baranda has five mouldings. The pyramidal gandi of the jagamohana has eleven receding tiers measuring 3.93 metres in height and is set in two potalas. The lower potala has six tiers whereas the upper potala has five tiers. The bada above the pabhaga is non-existent, with no raha niche.

The pabhaga of the vimana and jagamohana in the raha paga portion is decorated with miniature rekha deul flanked by khakhara mundi pilaster. Above the pabhaga are balustrade windows in the northern and southern wall of the jagamohana that measure 1.00 metres in height and 1.15 metres in width. The miniature rekha angasikharas are used as decorative motifs both in the tala and upara jangha in the anuraha and anuratha pagas.

The pratiratha bears khakhara mundi pilaster in talajangha and pidha mundi pilaster in upara jangha. Similar decoration is found in the kanika paga. The original doorjambs and lintel are non-existent in both the vimana and jagamohana. The recent renovations done by Orissa State Archaeology have replaced them with plain doorjambs and lintels. The pabhaga of vimana indicates that it was a pancharatha temple while the jagamohana is navaratha.

There is a compound wall measuring 35.75 metres in length x18.35 metres in breadth and 1.70 metres in height with a thickness of 0.50 metres made of dressed laterite blocks. The compound has an entrance in the southern corner. Temple fragments and broken images are found in the temple precinct and right above the compound wall of all sides. The head of a divinity is found in the western precinct of the temple.

== See also ==
- List of temples in Bhubaneswar
