= Bata Mahadeva =

Bata Mahadeva (Mukteswara Shiva)
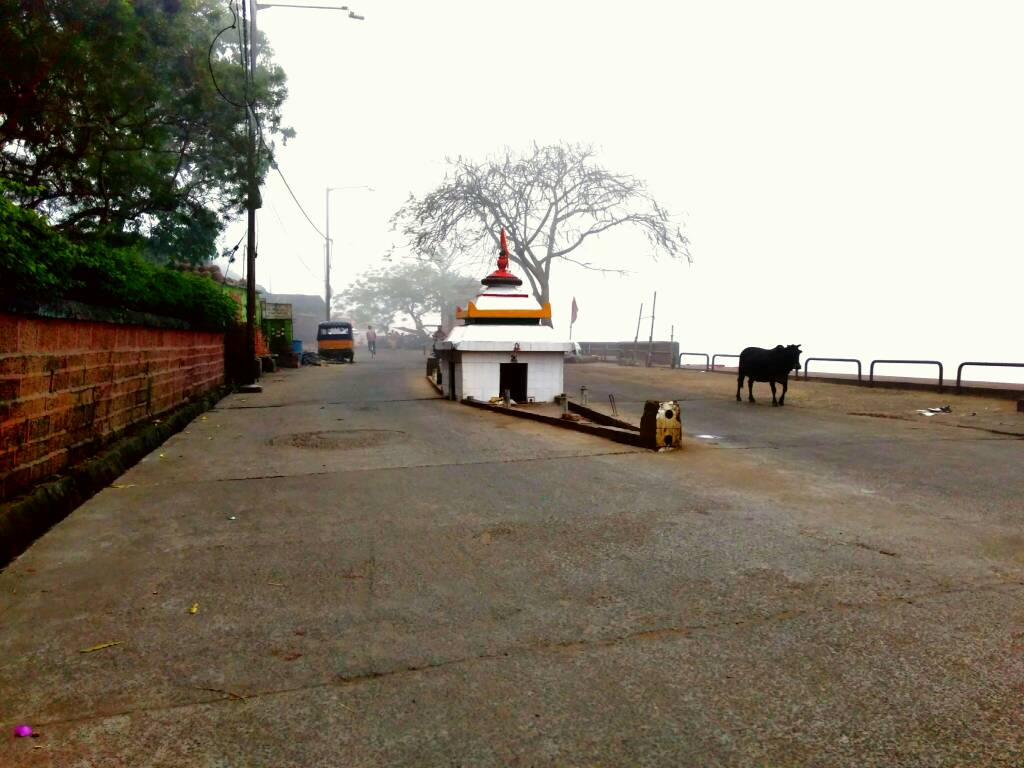

- Location in Odisha

Religion
- Affiliation: Hinduism
- District: Khurda
- Deity: Lord Shiva

Location
- Location: Bhubaneswar
- State: Odisha
- Country: India
- Interactive map of Bata Mahadeva (Mukteswara Shiva)
- Coordinates: 20°14′28.10″N 85°50′9.32″E

Architecture
- Type: Kalingan Style (Kalinga Architecture)
- Completed: 15th-16th century A.D.
- Elevation: 18 m (59 ft)

Bata Mahadeva (Mukteswara Shiva) is a Hindu temple, dedicated to Lord Shiva. This is one of the oldest temples in Bhubaneswar (the temple city of India), well-known for its heritage.

== Approach ==
The temple is located in the middle of the Bindusagar road leading from Kedar-Gouri lane to the Lingaraja temple. It is a working temple and faces towards the north. The deity enshrined here is a Siva lingam with a circular yoni pitha made of sandstone.

== Tradition and legends ==
According to local legend, when Mahadeva visited Ekamra Nagari he took rest at this place. Since it is located in the middle of the road it is known as Bata Mahadeva.

== Description ==
This temple is not under private ownership but comes under public property. It is under the control of the Lingaraja Temple administration.

Judging from its architectural features, it was built in the 15th or 16th century CE. It is a stone building of the Pidha Deula type. The temple has always been used for worship, and this use continues, principally in the form of the offering of pinda to the ancestors.

== Surroundings ==
The temple is surrounded by road on all four sides and faces north. The Ananta Basudeba Temple is to the east of it at a distance of 15.00 m, Bindusagar is to the west at a distance of 10.00 m, and the Lingaraja temple to the south at a distance of 100 m.

== Architecture ==
The temple has a square sanctum measuring 1.95 m^{2}. It is pancharatha in plan as distinguished by a central raha with a pair of anuratha pagas and kanika pagas on either side of the raha. In elevation, the vimana is of pidha order measuring 1.95 m in height. From bottom to top the temple has bada, gandi and mastaka. The bada measures 1.05 m in height and is without any moulding. The gandi consists of two receding tiers and measures 1.30 m in height. The mastaka measures 0.60 m.

The plain doorjambs measure 0.82 m in height and 0.53 m in width.

The temple is built of sandstone using dry masonry in pidha deula style. It is clad in marble and covered in lime wash.

== Conservation ==
The temple is in comparatively fair condition due to proper care and recent renovation work, although the western wall of the gandi is partly broken. The temple was repaired and maintained by local people shortly before 2006.
