= Tirthesvara Siva Temple =

Tirthesvara Siva temple
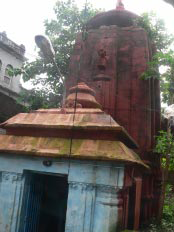

- Location in Orissa

Religion
- Affiliation: Hinduism
- Deity: lord Siva

Location
- Location: Bhubaneswar
- State: Orissa
- Country: India
- Coordinates: 20°14′36″N 85°50′10″E

Architecture
- Type: Kalingan Style (Kalinga Architecture)
- Completed: 14th century A.D.
- Elevation: 26 m (85 ft)

The Tirthesvara Siva temple is a Hindu template located in Bhubaneswar, the capital of Odisha, India.

== Location ==
The Tirthesvara Siva temple is located in 20◦ latitude and 14’ 36"N, 85◦ longitude and 50’ 10"E, in an elevation of-85feet.

It is located in Talabazar road, Old Town, Bhubaneswar. It is situated on the left side of road leading from Bindusagar to Lingaraja temple. The temple is facing towards west. The enshrining deity is a Siva lingam within a circular Yonipitha which is located at a depth of 0.94 metres below the door level. It is a living temple.

== History ==
The architectural features of the temple resembles with the Ganga period so it is believed that it was established in the 14th century A.D.

== Architecture ==
This is a temple building having a vimana and a jaga mohan subtype. Vimana is a rekha deul while jagamohana is a pidha deul.

- Surrounding: The temple is surrounded by private residential buildings on three sides of east, north and south and the Tala bazaar road in the west.
- Orientation: The temple is facing towards west.
- Architectural features (Plan & Elevation) 405 On plan, the temple has a vimana and a jagamohana. The vimana measures 4.30 square metres, Jagamohana 3.40 metres in length and 4.15 metres in breadth and ganthiala 0.36 metres. The sanctum measures 2.03 square metres. The pabhaga of the vimana have been buried from all the sides. The vimana has panchanga bada. Talajangha measures 0.66 metres, bandhana 0.21 metres, upara jangha 0.65 metres and baranda 0.49 metres and gandi measures 5.30 metres. The mastaka is 2.00 metres. The jagamohana which is a later addition has a trianga bada. Visible parts of pabhaga measure 0.20 metres jangha 1.30 metres, baranda 0.38 metres, Gandi 1.30 metres and mastaka measures 0.98 metres. Gandi of the vimana distinguished by central raha and pair of anuratha and kanika paga are on either side of raha. The temple is plain because of the lime plaster on all over the walls which have been finished by a red wash.
- Raha niche & parsva devatas: The raha niches on three sides measure 0.66 metres in height, 0.43 metres in width and 0.23 metres in depth respectively, surmounted by a khakhara mundis. All the three niches are empty.
- Decorative features: Doorjamb: The doorjambs of the vimana measures 1.98 metres in height and 1.30 metres in width. At the base there are dvarapala niches with khakhara mundi that enshrine two Saiva dvarapalas standing in flexed position holding a trident in left and sword in right hands.

Lintel: The graha architrave that measures 2.05 metres in length and 0.30 metres in width have nine grahas are flanked by two atlantid ganas on both the sides. In the lalatabimba niche (0.28 metres x 0.19 metres.) there is a Gajalaxmi.

- Building material: It is made up off fine grained ochrous sandstone.
- Construction techniques: Dry masonry type of construction technique was used.
- Style: Kalingan style.

== Current state ==
Growth of trees and other vegetation on the superstructure, particularly on the mastaka of the temple create problem to the monument. The roots and rootlets of the trees are expanding the gaps between the joints of the dry stone masonry and facilitating seepage of rain water into the sanctum. Pipal trees on the superstructure endanger the monument.

Growth of vegetation on the structure shows the signs of distress. The temple is buried up to the pabhaga portion.

Repairs and Maintenance

The temple was renovated by local people and maintained by the priest Deven Samantaray of Talabazar. Clearance of the vegetation sealing of the cracks and gasping the stone masonry.

Threats to the property

Growth of pipal trees and various vegetations endangers the temple property.

Conservation problem and remedies:

The wild grass, creepers and pipal trees growing on the beki of the temple cause serious threat to the monument. The vegetation needs to be removed immediately. The cracks and gaps in the dry stone masonry should be sealed to check water seepage. The monument406 suffocates because of encroachment of residential buildings from three sides. Because of the encroachments from all the sides including the road in the front, the rain water stagnates within the temple precinct. Provision needs to be made to drain out the rainwater. Detached and loose sculptures There is an image of a four armed Sidhivinayaka on the right side of the entrance to the vimana.

== Significance ==
It has cultural significance like Various religious functions like Sankrant i, Shiva chatrudarshi, Samabar jalabhisekha, Dahana- chori are observed.
