= Kartikesvara Siva Temple =

- Location in Orissa

Religion
- Affiliation: Hinduism
- Deity: ShivaLingam

Location
- Location: Old Town, Bhubaneswar
- State: Orissa
- Country: India
- Coordinates: 20°14′33″N 85°51′12″E

Architecture
- Type: Kalingan Style (Kalinga Architecture)
- Completed: 13th century A.D.
- Elevation: 22 m (72 ft)

Kartikesvara Siva Temple (Location: Lat. 20° 14’27" N., Long. 85° 50’ 12"E., Elev. 73 ft) is situated at a distance of about 100 m from eastern gateway of Lingaraj temple. It is on the left side of the temple road leading from Lingaraja to Garej Chowk, Bhubaneswar, within the precinct of Gandhi Garabadu which is now under the Lingaraja Temple Administration. It dates from approximately the 13th Century CE based on architectural features and building material. The chief priest is Gandhi Garabadu. The vimana is rekha deul and Jagamohana is a pidha deul. It was built during the Ganga period. Gandhi Garabadu Mahaprasada Anusthana operates in the precinct.

== Layout ==
It is oriented facing west. The temple is surrounded by residential buildings in the eastern side and local shops (Cabins) market complex in the southern side. The temple is built of laterite using dry masonry in the Kalingan style.

The temple is buried up to the jangha portion. It is pancharatha on plan as distinguished by a central raha and pair of anuratha and kanika pagas on either side of the raha. The vimana is of rekha order and jaga mohan is a pidha deul. The visible portion measures 6.40 m from the present ground level. The niches in the eastern side measures 0.82 m in height x 0.55 m in width with a depth of 0.46 m while the other niches are buried.

The temple walls are plain. The doorjambs of jagamohana is carved with three plain vertical bands measures 1.58 m in height and 1.30 m in width. At the lalatabimba there is a Gajalaxmi seated in lalitasana and flanked by two elephants on either side standing on full blown lotus. The architrave above the doorjamb is carved with the usual navagraha. The gandi is decorated with angasikharas and bhumi amlas. Since the temple is pancharatha in plan and the pilasters are also carved as pancharatha. There is no compound wall but it is within the boundary wall of Gandhi garabadu Mahaprasada Anusthana and Narayana Maharana's residencial plot.

== Condition description ==
It is in Good/Fair condition but showing signs of advanced deterioration. The state of decay/danger of disappearance is rated very fast due to the growth of vegetation like pipal tree and absence of mastaka. Rain water is seeping inside the sanctum due to the absence of mastaka and stagnating inside the sanctum. It is completely damaged up to the gandi portion. No work of repair or maintenance in the recent past seems to have been done. Encroachment problem and growth of vegetation mainly on the roof of the jagamohana and vimana and seepage of rain water directly into the sanctum. It is now in a bad state of preservation.

== See also ==
- Category:Shiva temples
- List of Hindu temples in India#Orissa
