= Arjunesvara Siva Temple =

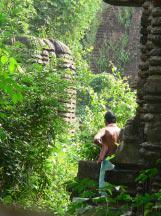

- Location in Orissa

Religion
- Affiliation: Hinduism
- Deity: lord Vishnu

Location
- Location: Bhubaneswar
- State: Orissa
- Country: India
- Interactive map of Arjunesvara Siva Temple
- Coordinates: 20°14′41″N 85°50′06″E

Architecture
- Type: Kalinga Architecture
- Completed: 12th century A.D.
- Elevation: 22 m (72 ft)

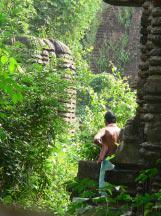
Arjunesvara Siva Temple

Arjunesvara Siva Temple is an abandoned 12th century temple in Bhubaneswar, in the Indian state of Orissa. The temple is situated on the southern embankment of the Bindusagar tank on the right side of the ratha road branching from the road connecting Lingaraja temple to Ramesvara temple.

== History ==
Architectural features like saptaratha on plan suggests that this temple was built in the 12th-13th Century A.D.

== Description ==
The temple faces west, behind the temple of Bhabani Sankara and in the south-east corner of the Sari Deul, which is an ASI protected monument.

=== Architecture ===
The temple is constructed in the Kalingan style using grey sandstone and dry masonry. The main temple is a Rekha Deul. The temple has a square vimana measuring 3.5 square metres with a renovated frontal porch of 0.8 metres. The vimana is saptaratha with seven offset projections on each wall as distinguished by a central raha and a pair of anuraha, anuratha, and kanika pagas on either side. The cella measures 1.5 square metres. The vimana is of rekha order that is 6.2 metres tall. The temple has typical bada and gandi with mastaka missing. With threefold divisions of the bada, the temple has a panchaga bada measuring 2.2 metres in height. At the bottom, the pabhaga measures 0.5 metres, tala jangha 0.5 metres, bandhana 0.2 metres, upara jangha 0.40 metres and baranda with a set of five mouldings measures 0.56 metres in height. Gandi measures 4.00 metres in height and is devoid of decoration.

The raha niches on three sides uniformly measuring 0.55 metres in height x 0.3 metres in width x 0.15 metres in depth, are all empty. However, on both sides, the niches are decorated with scrollwork.

=== Decorative features ===
Above the doorjambs is a sukanasa which is designed after a khakhara mundi flanked by two miniature rekha deulas. Up to the gandi portion the temple is carved with series of khakhara mundis inserted in every paga. The jangha portion is decorated with series of stylised chaitya motifs and bada is relieved with scrollwork. The doorjambs measure 1.4 metres in height and 0.95 metres in width and are decorated with three plain vertical bands. The lintel is plain.

== Condition ==
The temple is showing signs of deterioration and a rapid process of decay due to the growth of vegetation on the exterior walls. Since there is no mastaka, rain water enters inside the sanctum. Local people use it as a public toilet. The temple was repaired by Orissa State Archaeology under X and XI Finance Commission Award.
