= Laxminrusingha Temple =

Hindu temple in Cuttack, Odisha, India

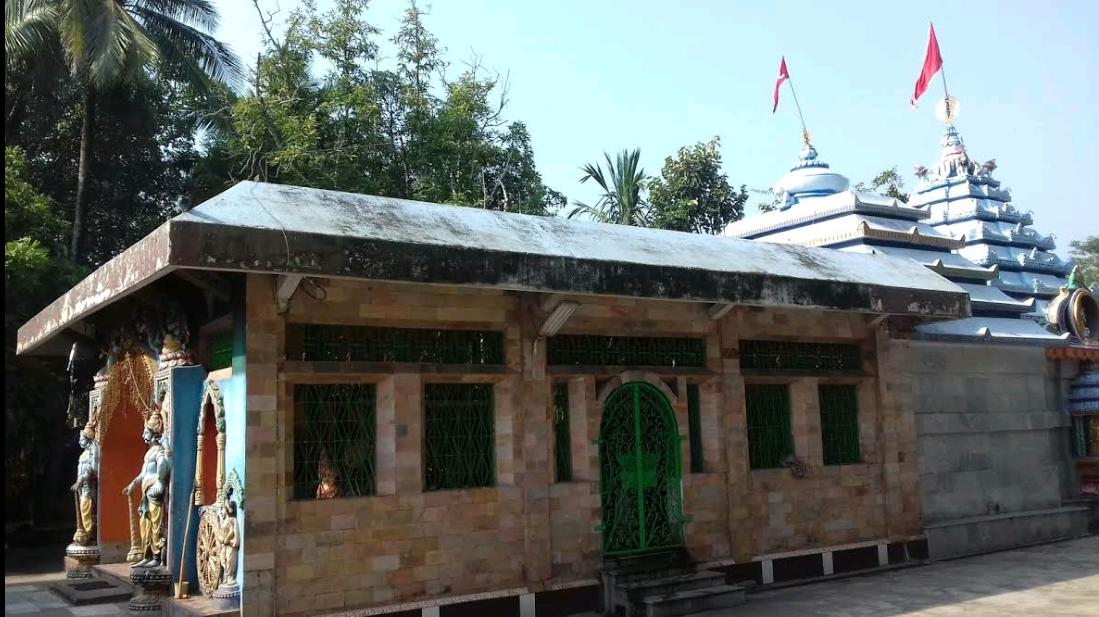

- Location in Odisha

Religion
- Affiliation: Hinduism
- District: Cuttack
- Deity: Lord Nrusingha
- Festivals: Nrusingha Chaturdashi, Dola Purnima

Location
- Location: Pubakachha Village, Salipur
- State: Odisha
- Country: India
- Coordinates: 20°29′02″N 85°59′43″E

Architecture
- Type: Kalinga Architecture
- Creator: Unknown

Laxminrusingha Temple is a Hindu Temple dedicated to Lord Nrusingha (Avatar of lord Vishnu). It is located at Purbakachha village (Near Bahugram) in Salipur area of Cuttack district in Odisha, India.

== Location ==
It located from 15 kilometres (9.3 mi) east of Cuttack city and 800 m (2,600 ft) from S.H-9A (Jagatpur-Salipur-Pattamundai-Chandabali road) via Nrusingha Bazaar. It can be reached by Cuttack-Salipur, Cuttack-Nichintakoili buses and Tata Magic or local automobiles. The nearest railway station is Jagatpur Railway station (10 km (6.2 mi) away) and Cuttack Junction railway station (14 km (8.7 mi) away) and the nearest Airport is Biju Patnaik Airport, Bhubaneswar (42 km (26 mi) away).
