= Tribeniswar Temple =

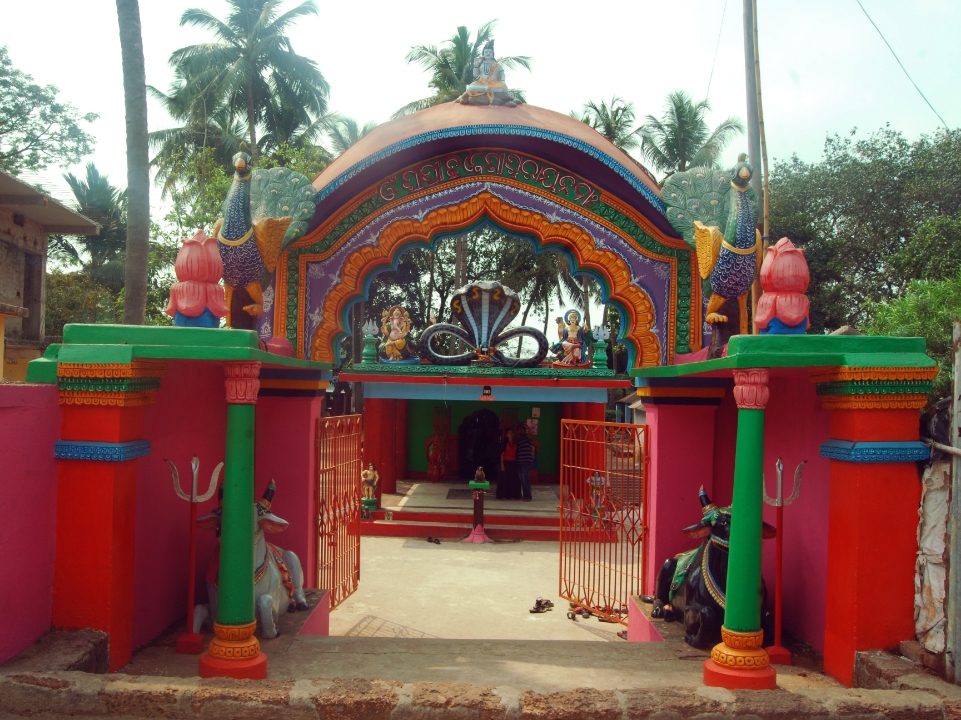
- Tribeniswar Temple at Chasakhand village

- Location in Odisha

Religion
- Affiliation: Hinduism
- District: Cuttack
- Deity: Lord Shiva
- Festivals: Mahashivratri, Kartik Purnima

Location
- Location: Chasakhanda village, Mahanga
- State: Odisha
- Country: India
- Interactive map of Tribeniswar Temple
- Coordinates: 20°34′20″N 86°07′27″E

Architecture
- Type: Kalinga Architecture
- Creator: Unknown

Tribeniswar Temple is a Shaiva pitha of Odisha in India. This is one of a Patalaphuta Shivalinga temple dedicated to lord Shiva and located at Chasakhanda village (near Mauda Panchayat) of Mahanga in Cuttack district.

== Roadway & communication ==
This temple is located 33 kilometers from North-East direction of Cuttack city and directly connected to NH-5 via Tangi and nearest Railway station is Byree Railway station, Sri Jhadeswar Road, Barithengarh and Tangi (Kapilas Road). It can be communicated by few buses of Cuttack-Tribeniswar route.
