= Lokanath Siva Temple =

- Location in Orissa

Religion
- Affiliation: Hinduism
- Deity: Siva

Location
- Location: Bhubaneswar
- State: Orissa
- Country: India
- Interactive map of Lokanath Siva Temple
- Coordinates: 20°15′22″N 85°50′18″E

Architecture
- Type: Kalingan Style (Kalinga Architecture)
- Completed: 14th century A.D.
- Elevation: 17 m (56 ft)

Present Name- Lokanath Siva Temple (15th century.) Address: Tala Bazar Road, Old Town, Bhubaneswar, Odisha, India.

Approach: Lokanath Siva Temple is located on the right side of the Tala Bazar Road leading from KedarGouri lane to Lingaraja Temple and as the eastern embracement of the Bindusagar Tank. The temple is facing towards south and the presiding deity is a Siva lingam at the center of a circular yonipitha. The cella measures 1.20 square metres.

Gunanidhi Panda is the chief priest of this temple.

== Physical description ==
The temple is surrounded by Tala Bazar Road in the east, Bindu Sagar Lake in the west. The temple is facing towards east.

== Architectural features ==
On plan, the temple has a vimana measuring 3.20.metres in length and 2.80 metres in width. The sanctum measures 1.20 in square metres. On elevation, vimana is of pidha order measuring 4.75 metres in height from pabhaga kalasa. From bottom to the top, the temple has bada (2.25 metres), gandi (1.50 metres) and mastaka (1.00 metres).

The Raha niche on three sides uniformly measures 0.53 metres in height x 0.35 metres in width with a depth of 0.15 metres. The niches are empty.

== Decorative features ==
Doorjamb: The doorjamb measuring 1.30 metres in height x 0.70 metres in width is devoid of any decoration.

Building material is sandstone.vii) Construction techniques used is of dry masonry.

== State of preservation ==
The condition of the temple is good, because of the renovation work. The temple is repaired by the Orissa State Archaeology under the X and XI Finance Commission Award. Besides the Siva-lingam there is an amorous image of Hara-Parvati is noticed inside the sanctum.

== See also ==
- List of temples in Bhubaneswar

== Reference notes ==
- Lesser Known Monuments of Bhubaneswar by Dr. Sadasiba Pradhan (ISBN 81-7375-164-1).
- http://www.ignca.nic.in/
- List of Hindu temples in India#Orissa
