= Kharakhia Vaidyanatha Precinct =

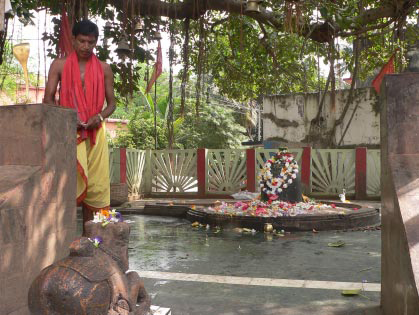

- Location in Orissa

Religion
- Affiliation: Hinduism
- Deity: lord Siva

Location
- Location: Bhubaneswar
- State: Orissa
- Country: India
- Interactive map of Kharakhia Vaidyanatha Precinct
- Coordinates: 20°14′06″N 85°50′00″E

Architecture
- Type: Kalinga
- Elevation: 26 m (85 ft)

Kharakhia Vaidyanatha Precinct is an Indian temple in Bhubaneswar, Odisha, India. The chief priest of the shrine is the owner of the Kharakhia Vaidyanatha precinct.

== Architecture ==
Kharakhia Vaidyanatha has a Siva lingam within a large circular yonipitha made of stone over a lofty platform that is now enshrined beneath a Pipal tree. There is no trace of superstructure over the lingam. The deity is so named because it is open to the sky with the sun rays falling directly over it throughout the day (Kharakhia). It is under regular worship. At a distance of 1.63 metres from the open shrine is an ancient circular well made of laterite block that measures 1.00 diameters.

== Location ==
Latitide 20° 14’ 06"N; longitude 85° 50’ 00"E; elevation 85 ft
