= Lingaraj Rest House =

Lingaraja Rest House
- Location in Orissa

Religion
- Affiliation: Hinduism
- District: Khorda
- Deity: Siva

Location
- Location: Bhubaneswar
- State: Orissa
- Country: India
- Interactive map of Lingaraja Rest House
- Coordinates: 20°15′22″N 85°50′18″E

Architecture
- Type: Kalingan Style (Kalinga architecture)
- Completed: 14th century A.D.
- Elevation: 17 m (56 ft)

Lingaraja Rest House or Lingaraja Bisrama Ghara is a 14th century temple in Bhubaneswar.

== Approach ==
Lingaraja Rest House is situated on the western embankment of Bindu Sagar in Gyananagara (Hadi sahi), Old Town Bhubaneswar. One can approach the temple on the left side of the road leadingfrom Kedara-Gouri Chowk to Vaital temple. It is a pidha deul and is facing towards the south. There is no presiding deity as it served as the Rest House of lord Lingaraja, when the lord comes here to take rest in course of the Chandana Yatra, which is held in the month of may every year.

== Plan ==
i) Surrounding: The rest house is surrounded by western embankment of Bindusagar tank in the east and residential buildings in other three sides.

ii) Orientation: The rest house is facing towards south.

== Architectural features ==
The temple stands on a high platform measuring 0.66 m in height. On plan, the temple has a vimana, which is pancharatha. The vimana measures 4.25 m^{2}. Panchanga bada measures 2.23 m (pabhaga, talajangha, bandhana, upara jangha and baranda measures 0.60 m, 0.19 m, 0.48 m and 0.46 m respectively).

On elevation, the vimana is in pidha order and measures 6.23 m in height from pabhaga to mastaka. Gandi has five receding tiers and measures 2.50 m in height. An udyota simha is at the center of the gandi. Balustraded window in the eastern and western walls. The mastaka as usual has beki, ghanta, amlaka, khapuri and kalasa that measures 1.50 m in height.

Raha niche and parsvadevatas are not found in this temple. The doorjambs are plain. Lintel is plain and building material is sandstone.

== State of preservation ==
The northern wall has developed cracks and the rain water is seeping through the cracks. It is maintained by Lingaraja Temple Administration.

== Reference notes ==
- Lesser Known Monuments of Bhubaneswar by Dr. Sadasiba Pradhan (ISBN 81-7375-164-1).
- http://www.ignca.nic.in/
