= Tourism in Odisha =

Tourism in Odisha is one of the main contributors to the economy of Odisha, India, with a 500 km (310 mi) long coastline, mountains, lakes, natural biodiversity and rivers. Odisha is a major tourist destination in India, with various tourist attractions, including wildlife reserves, beaches, temples, monuments, the arts and festivals. Other than wildlife reserves, beaches, temples, monuments, the arts and festivals, the Odisha Tourism Development Corporation, a public sector undertaking of the Government of Odisha, is also developing the tourism sector of Odisha and India.

== Monuments ==
=== Temples ===
The major temples of Odisha are present in Ekamra Kshetra or the temple city of Bhubaneswar, Puri, Jajpur and Ganjam.

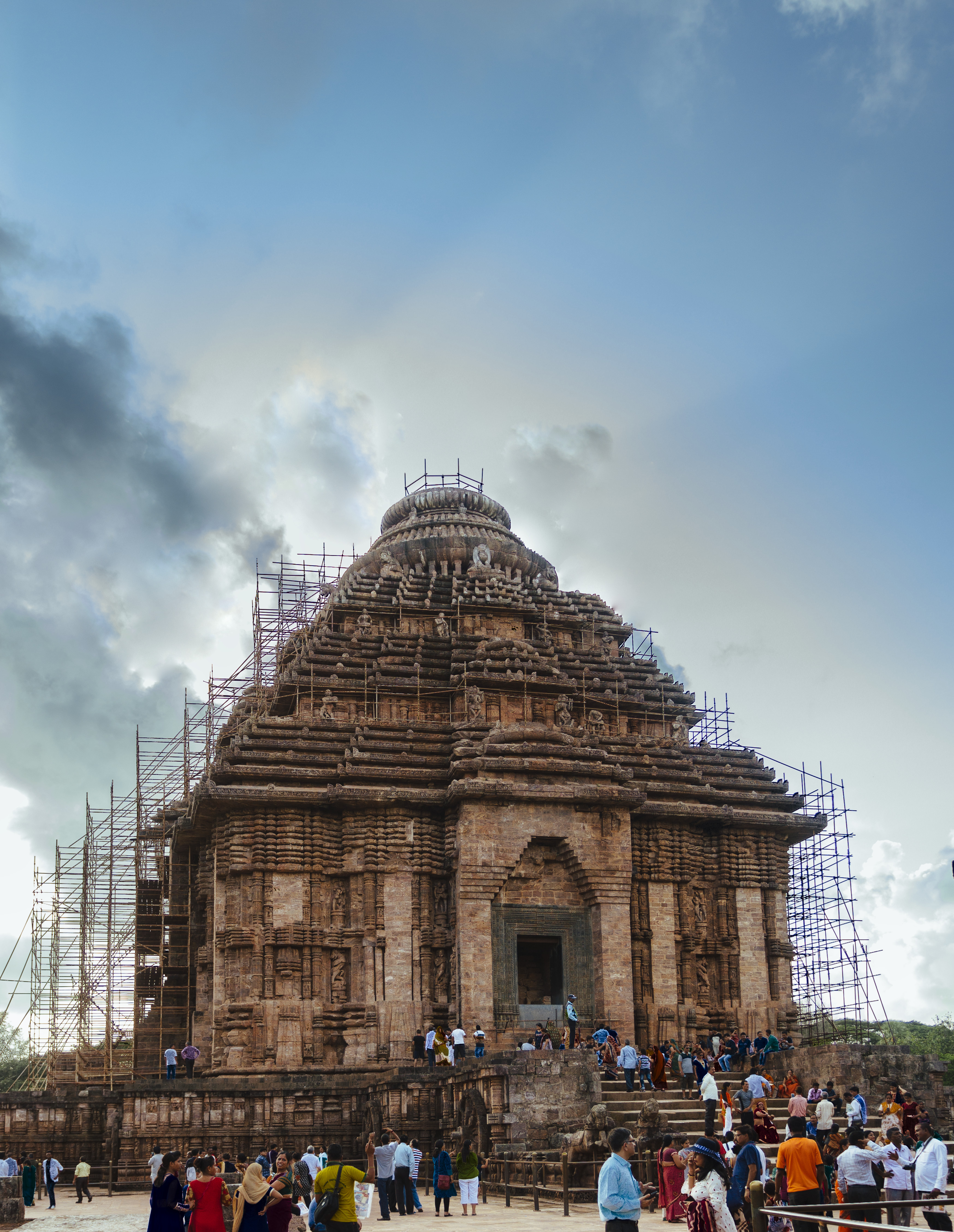
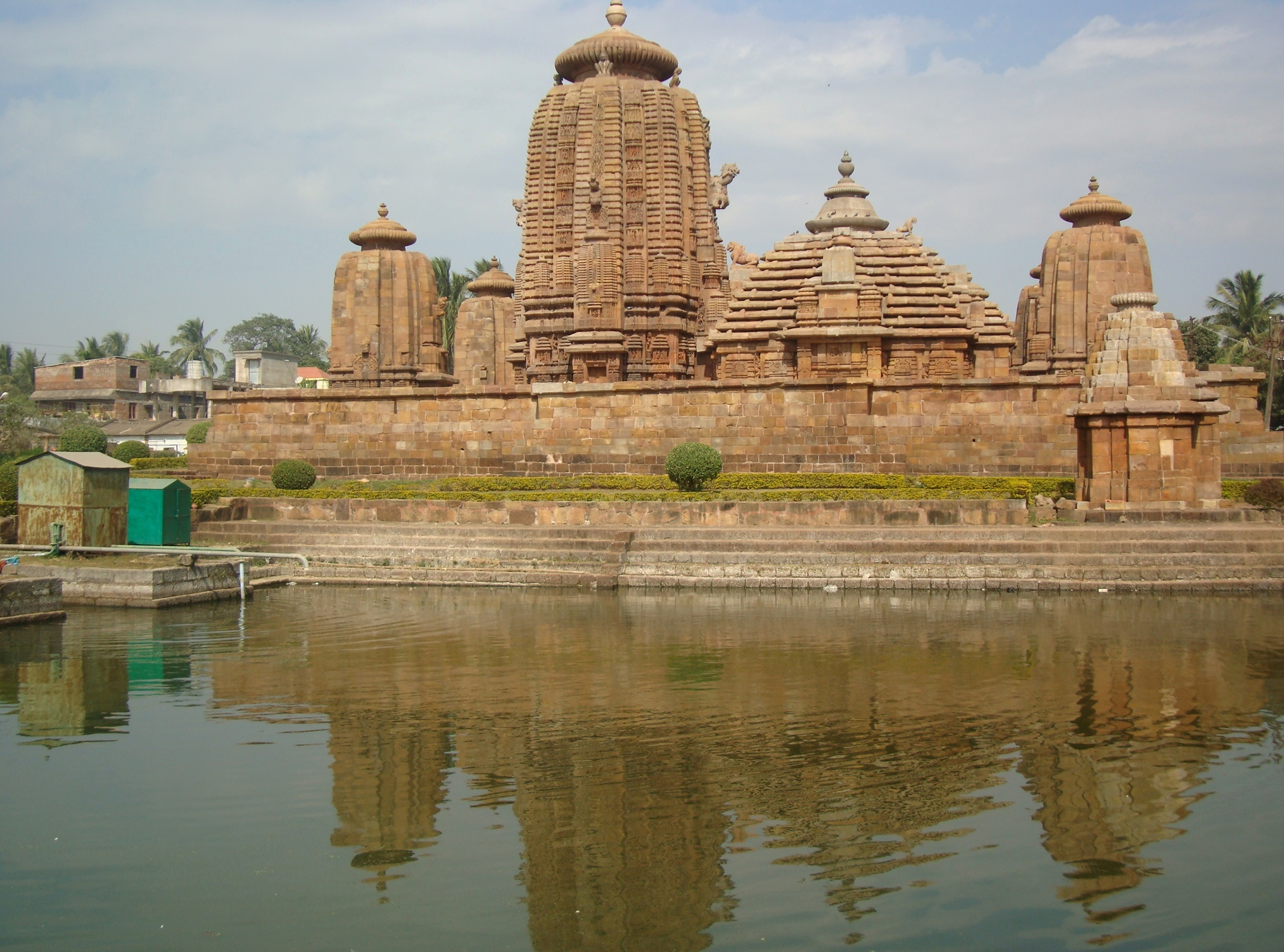
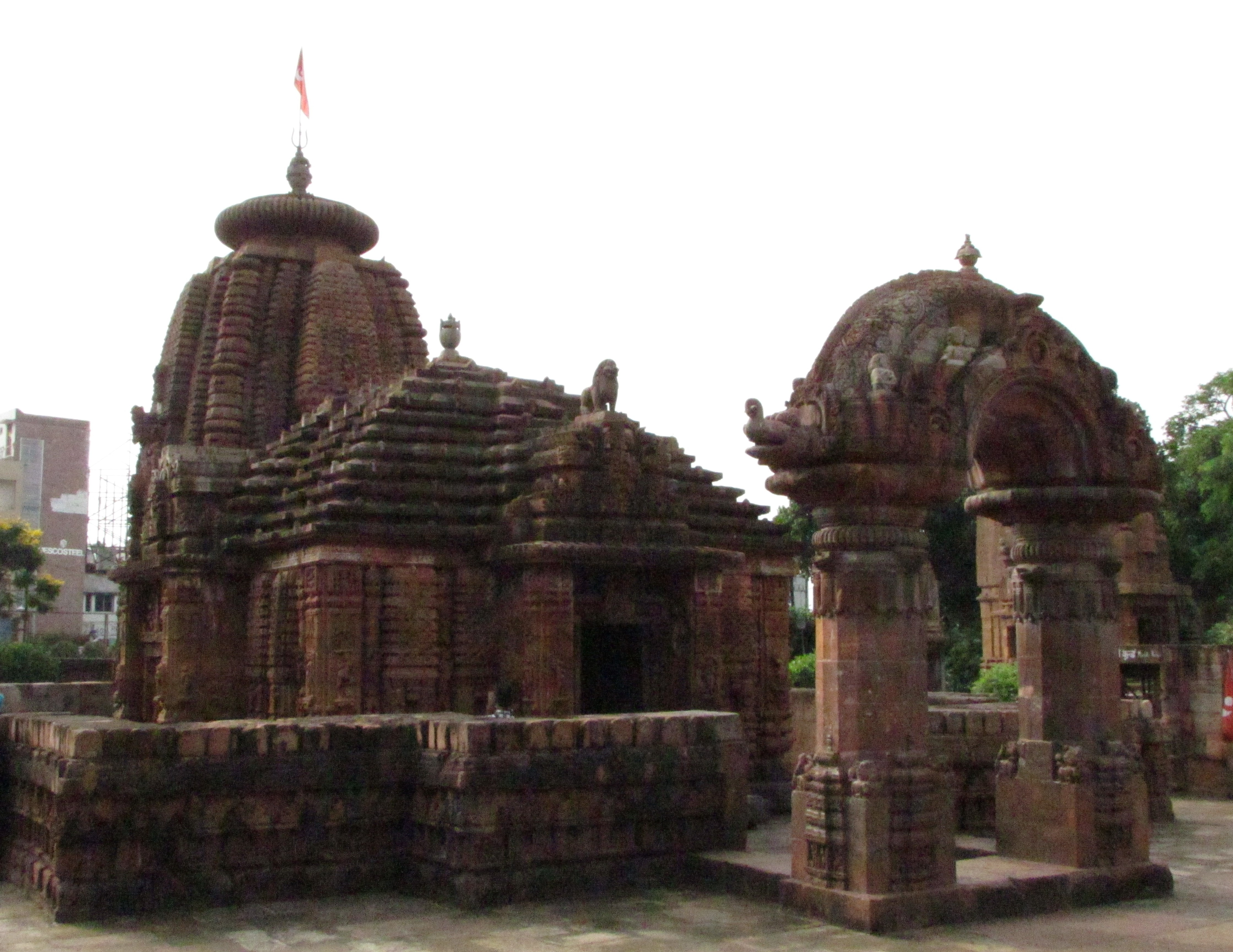
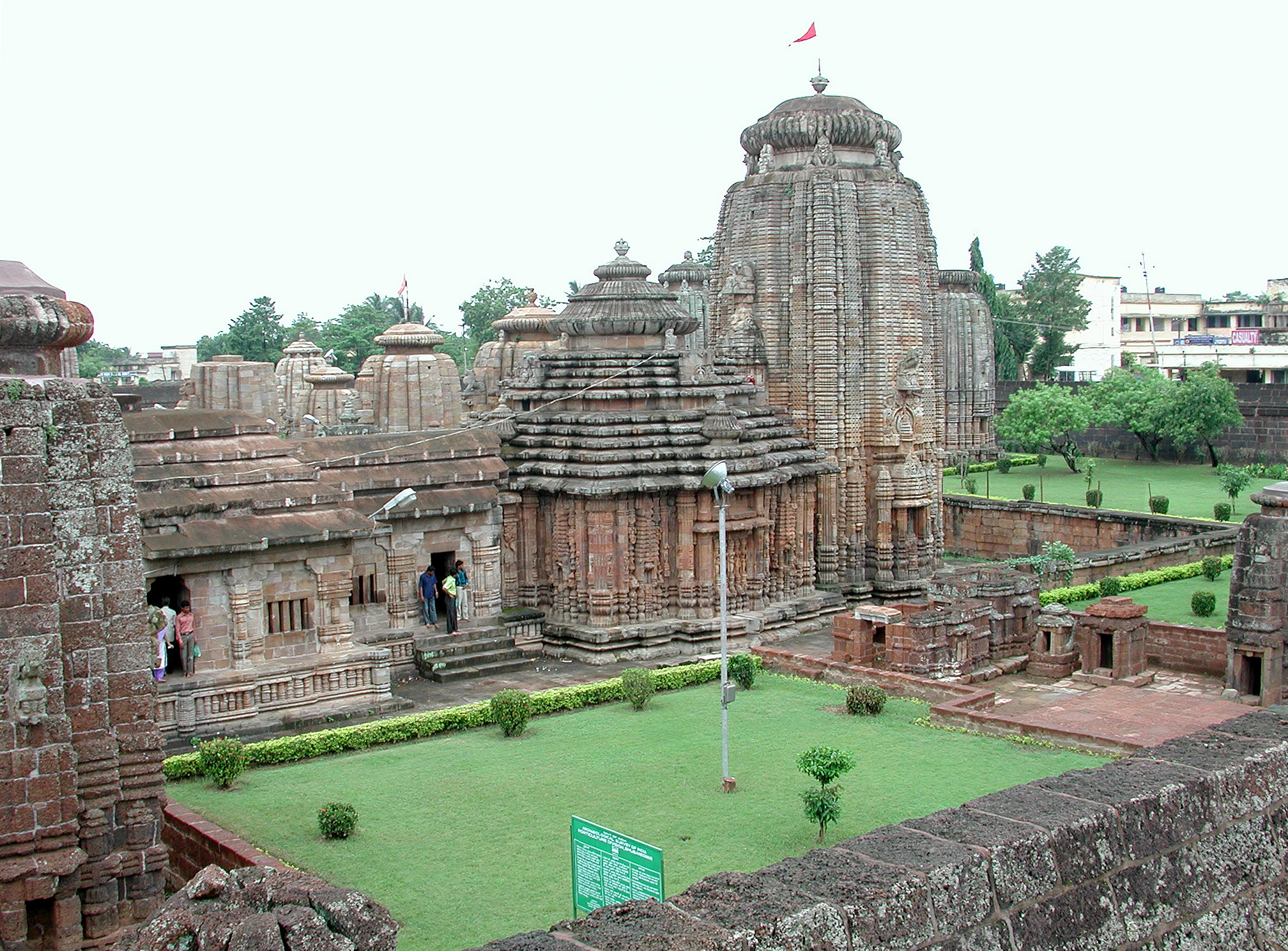
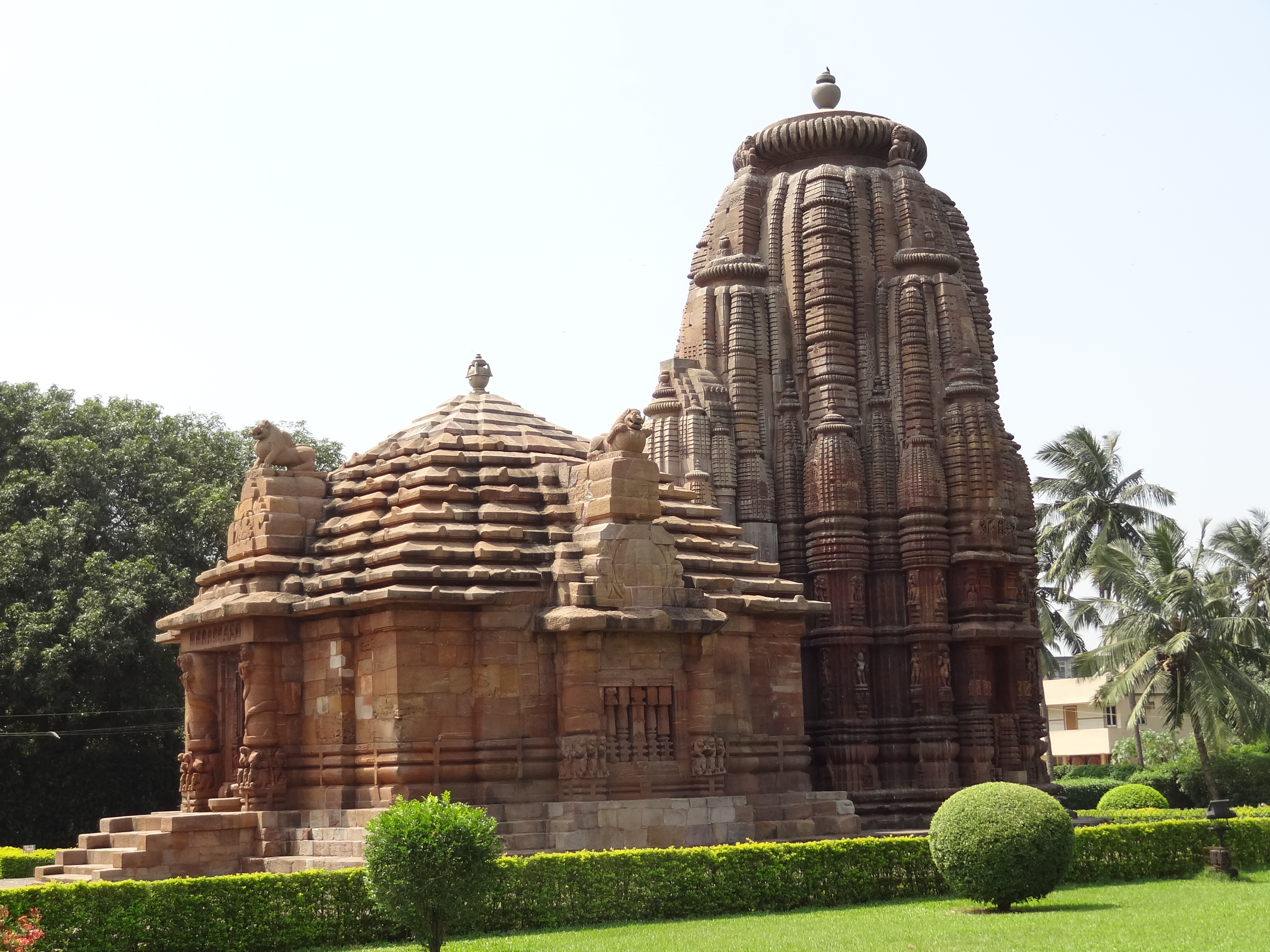
From Top; Left to Right: Konark Sun Temple, Brahmeswara Temple, Mukteswar Temple, Lingaraj Temple, and Rajarani Temple

Some other temples in the state include,

- Aisanyesvara Siva Temple
- Ajaikapada Bhairava Temple
- Akhadachandi Temple
- Alarnatha Mandira
- Anantasaayi Vishnu Temple
- Ananta Vasudeva Temple
- Annakoteshvara Temple
- Astasambhu Temples
- Baladevjew Temple
- Beleswar Temple
- Bhadrakali Temple, Aharapada
- Bhagabati Temple, Banapur
- Bhandara Ghara Shrine
- Bharati Matha
- Bhattarika Temple
- Bhima Kunda
- Bhringesvara Siva Temple
- Bhrukutesvar Siva Temple
- Bhuvaneshwar Temple, Boudh
- Bhusandeswar Temple, Balasore
- Biraja Temple
- Biranchinarayan Temple, Buguda
- Biranchinarayan Temple, Palia
- Brahma Temple, Bindusagar
- Brahma Temple, Niali
- Brahmeswara Temple
- Budha Ganesha Temple
- Byamokesvara Temple
- Chakra Narasimha Temple
- Chakreshvari Siva Temple
- Champakesvara Siva Temple
- Chandaneswar Temple, Balasore
- Chandrasekhara Mahadeva Temple
- Charchika Temple
- Chateshwar Temple
- Chausathi Jogini Temple
- Chintamanisvara Siva Temple
- Cuttack Chandi Temple
- Devasabha Temple
- Digambara Jaina Temple, Khandagiri
- Dishisvara Siva Temple
- Durga Temple, Baideshwar
- Durga Temple, Motia
- Emar Matha
- Gangesvara Siva Temple
- Godhaneswar temple
- Gosagaresvar Siva Temple
- Govardhana matha
- Gundicha Temple
- Hanuman Temple, Kedara-Gouri
- Harachandi Temple
- Harihara Deula
- Harishankar Temple
- Indralath Temple
- Jaleswar Siva Temple Precinct
- Jagannath Temple, Baripada
- Jagannath Temple, Dharakote
- Jagannath Temple, Koraput
- Jagannath Temple, Nayagarh
- Jagannath Temple, Puri
- Joranda Gadi
- Kakatpur Mangala Temple
- Kalika Siva Temple
- Kanaka Durga, Raulapalli
- Kapilash Temple
- Kapilesvara Siva Temple
- Kedareswar Temple
- Khirachora Gopinatha Temple
- Kichakeshwari Temple
- Konark Sun Temple
- Koneswaram temple
- Kosaleswara temple
- Kotitirtha Tank
- Kukutesvara Tank
- Labesvara Siva Temple
- Ladoo Baba Temple
- Lakhesvara Siva Temple
- Lakhmi Varaha Temple
- Lankeswari Temple
- Lingaraja Temple
- Lokanatha Temple
- Maa Barunei Temple
- Maa Borei Temple
- Maa Markama Temple
- Maa Tarini Temple, Ghatgaon
- Madhava Temple
- Madneswar Siva Temple
- Majhighariani Temple
- Mahavinayak Temple
- Mahishamardini Temple
- Mangala Temple
- Mangalesvara Siva Temple
- Manibhadresvara Temple – II
- Manikarnika Tank
- Manikeshwari Temple
- Marichi temple
- Markandeshwar Temple
- Mausimaa Temple
- Mausi Maa Temple
- Metakani Temple
- Mukteswar Temple
- Murga Mahadeva Shrine
- Nagesvara Temple, Bhubaneswar
- Narasimha Temple, Puri
- Nilakantheswar Temple
- Nilamadhav Temple
- Nrusinghanath Temple
- Pabaneswara Temple
- Panchalingeshwar
- Papanasini Siva Temple
- Parsurameswar Temple
- Parsvanath Jain Temple-I
- Parsvanath Jain Temple-II
- Parvati Temple, Odisha
- Patali Srikhetra
- Purvesvara Siva Temple
- Rajarani Temple
- Ramachandi Temple
- Ram Mandir, Janpath
- Rameshwar Deula
- Sakshigopal Temple
- Samaleswari Temple
- Saptamatruka Temple
- Sarvatresvara Siva Temple
- Sasisena Temple
- Sekhareswar Temple
- Siddhesvara Siva Temple
- Simhachalam Temple
- Simhanath Temple
- Sivatirtha Matha
- Subarnameru Temple
- Subarnesvara Siva Temple
- Suka Temple
- Sukutesvara Temple
- Sundaresvara Tank
- Sureswari temple
- Svapnesvara Siva Temple
- Talesvara Siva Temple
- Taratarini Temple
- Tirthesvara Siva Temple
- Upper Bagh Devi Temple
- Uttaresvara Siva Temple
- Vaital Deula
- Varahanatha Temple
- Varahi Deula, Chaurasi
- Vimala Temple
- Vishnu Temple, Bhubaneswar
- Yameshwar Temple

=== Buddhist monuments ===
- Dhauli
- Lalitgiri
- Pushpagiri
- Ratnagiri
- Udayagiri

=== Jain monuments ===
- Udayagiri and Khandagiri Caves

=== Forts ===
- Barabati Fort
- Chudanga Gada
- Raibania Fort
- Sisupalgarh
- Potagada Fort

== Flora and fauna ==
=== Lakes ===
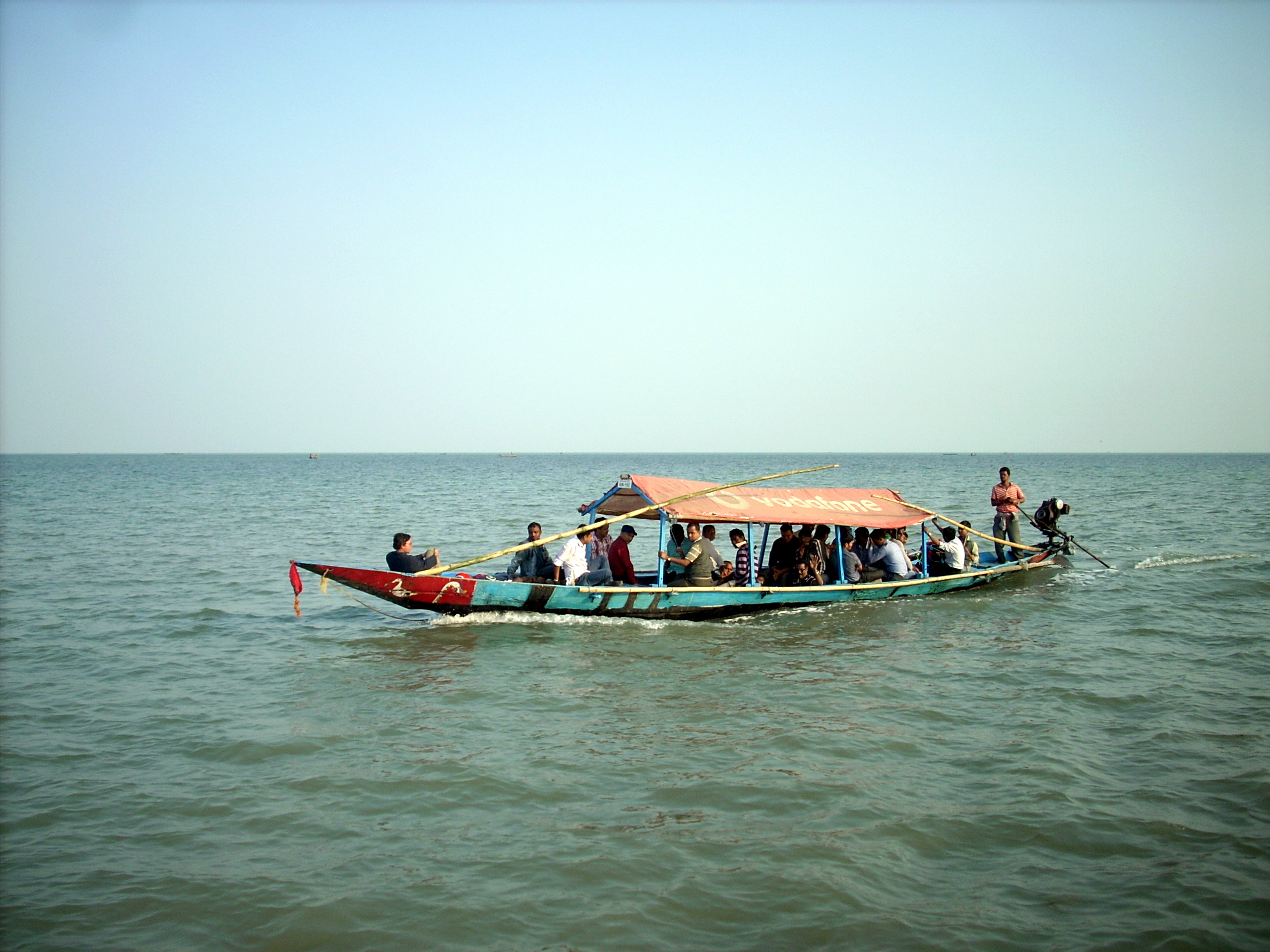
Chilika Lake

- Chilka Lake, at the mouth of the Daya River, is Asia's largest brackish water lake and the second largest brackish water lake in the world. It is a bird sanctuary for millions of migratory birds, and it is also noted for its population of Irrawaddy dolphins (Orcaella brevirostris), the only known population of Irrawaddy dolphins in India. It is one of only two lagoons in the world that are home to these species.
- Tampara Lake: Tampara Lake is one of the largest fresh water lakes in the state near Berhampur. The lake and the nearby Chilika Lagoon highlight the ecological diversity Odisha is blessed with. While Tampara is a fresh water lake, Chilika is a brackish water lagoon.
- Kanjia Lake: This lake inside the Nandankanan Zoological Park is known for boat riding and the scenery of Bhubaneswar, Odisha, India.* Anshupa Lake is a horseshoe-shaped freshwater lake on the left bank of the Mahanadi River, opposite Banki in the Cuttack district of Odisha, India. Anshupa Lake in Banki is 40 kilometres (25 mi) from the city of Cuttack, which also acts as a shelter for the migratory birds in winter.

=== Waterfalls ===
- Badaghagara Waterfall
- Barehipani Falls
- Devkund Waterfall
- Duduma Waterfalls
- Joranda Falls
- Khandadhar Falls, Kendujhar
- Khandadhar Falls, Sundagarh
- Koilighugar Waterfall
- Sanaghagara Waterfall
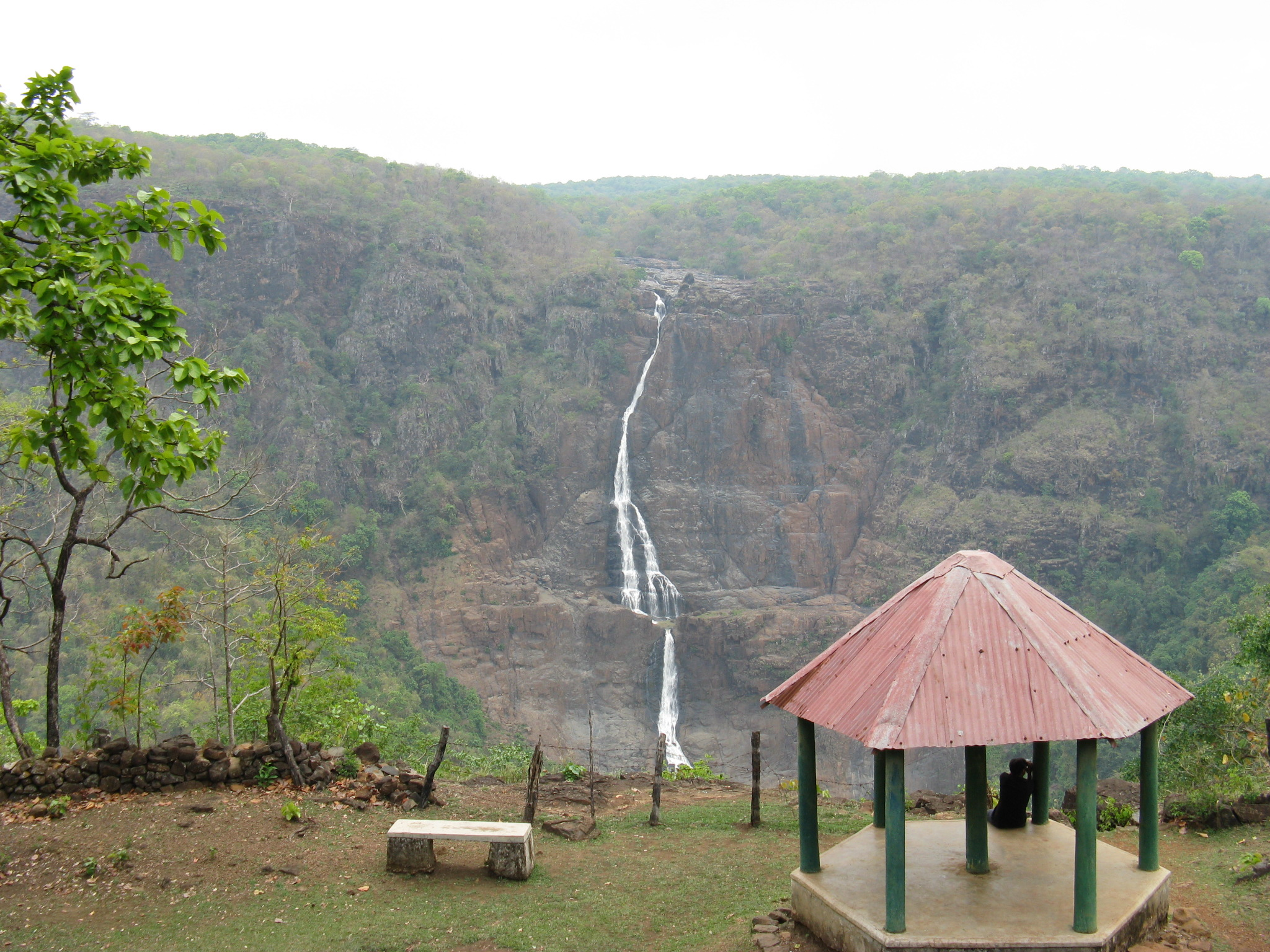
Barehipani Falls

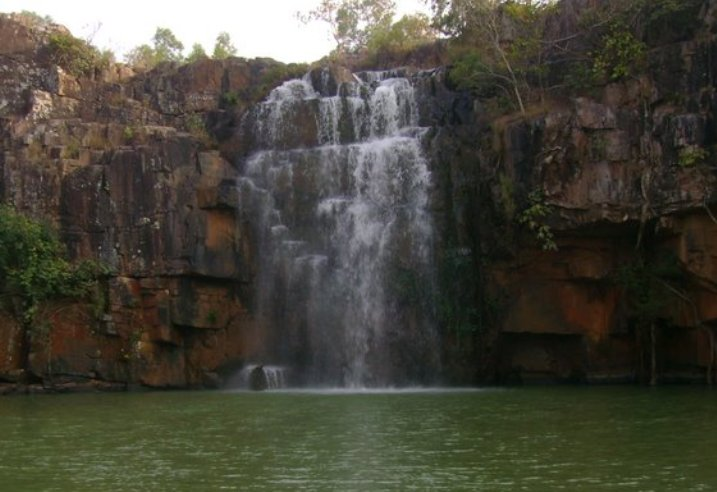
Badaghagara Waterfall

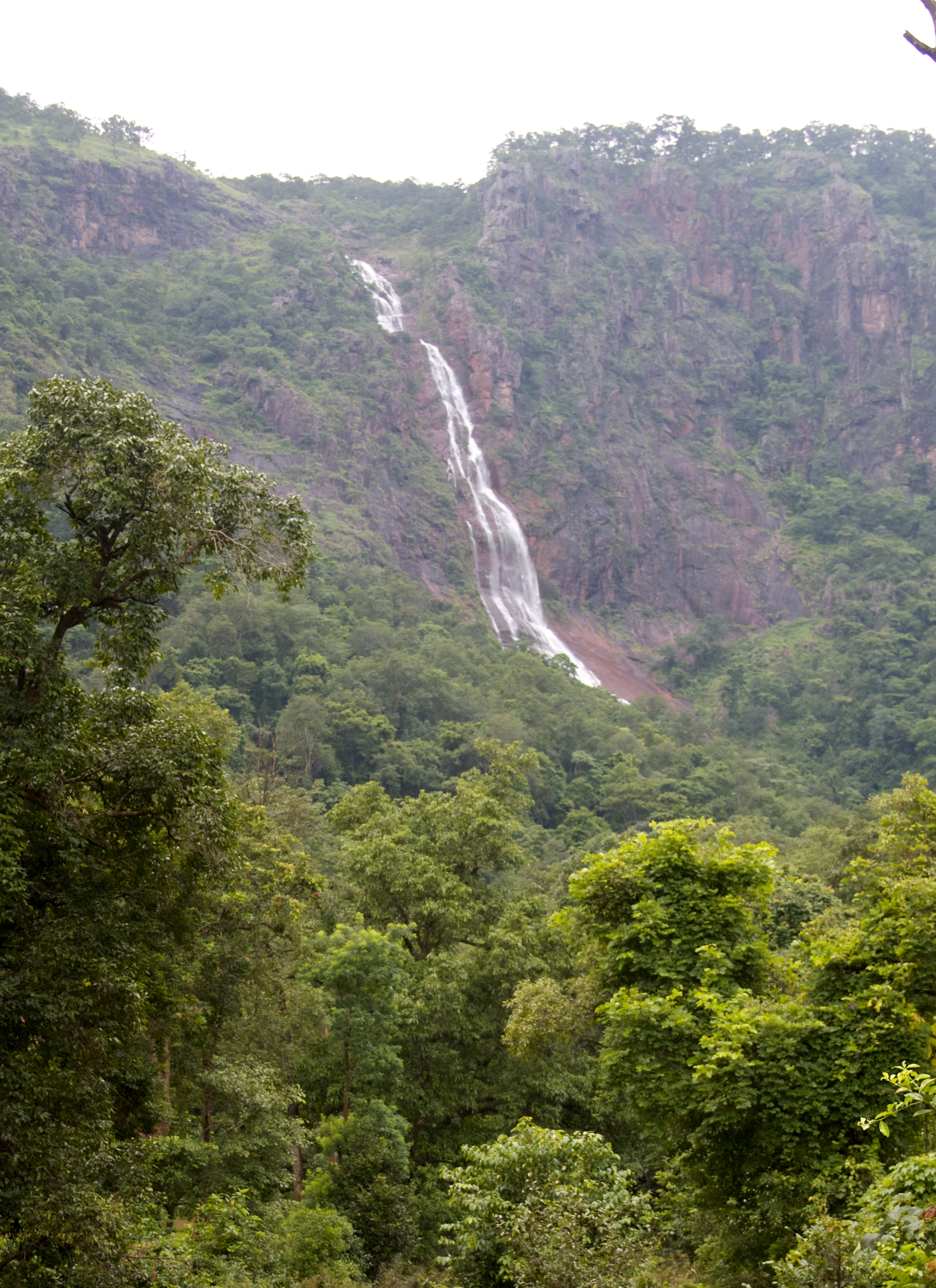
Khandadhar Falls, Sundagarh

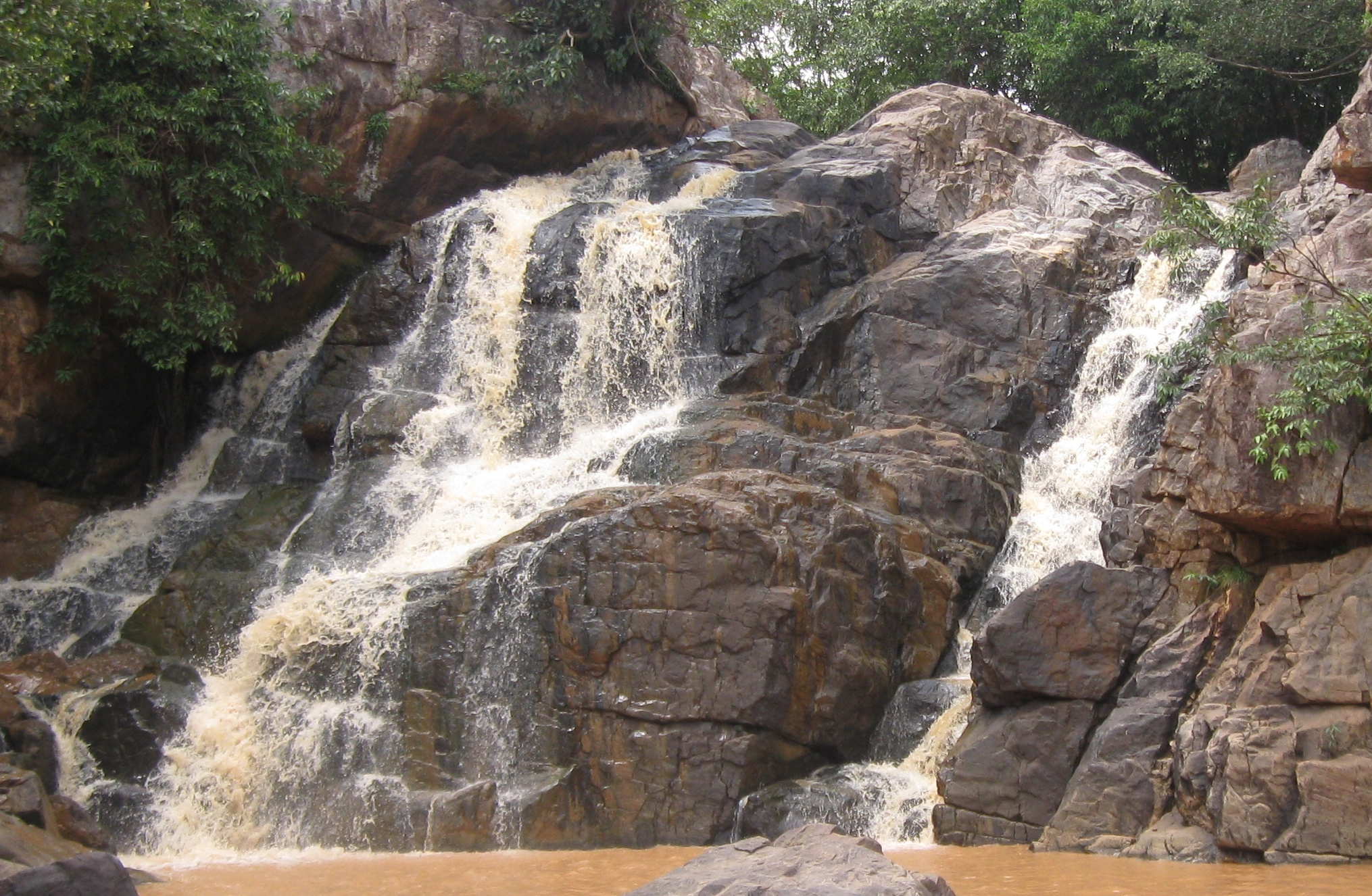
Sanaghagara Waterfall

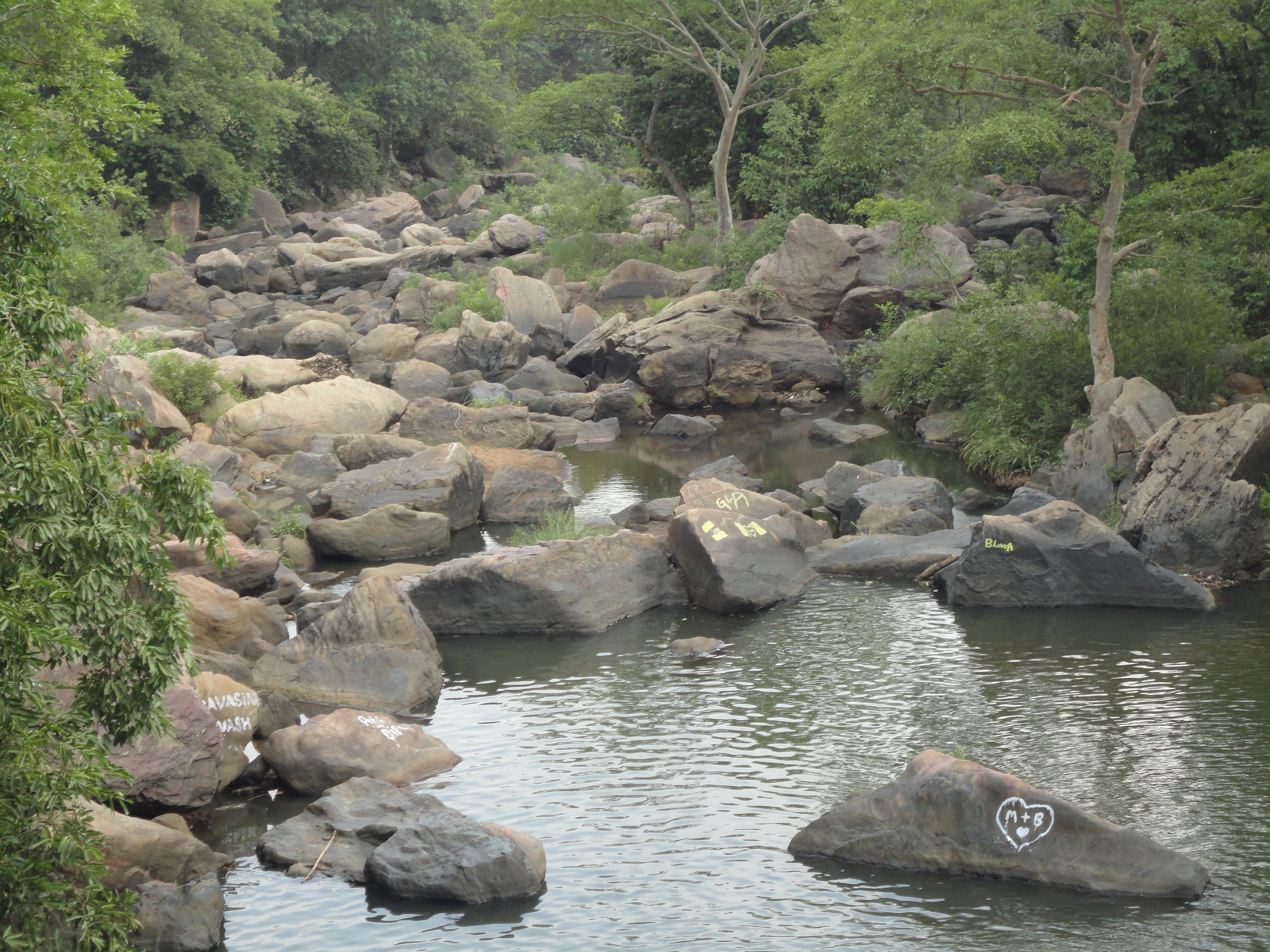
Koilighugar Waterfall

Khandadhar Falls, Kendujhar

=== Hot springs ===
- Atri
- Deulajhari
- Taptapani
- Tarabalo

== Wildlife ==
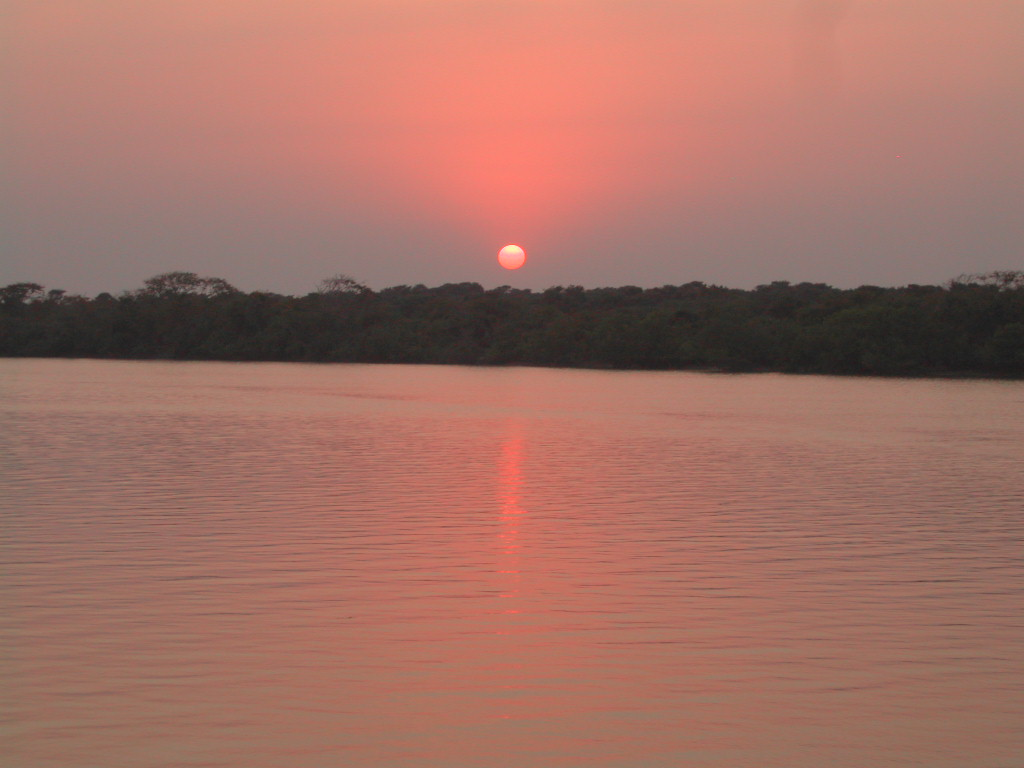
Sunset at Bhitarkanika National Park Lake

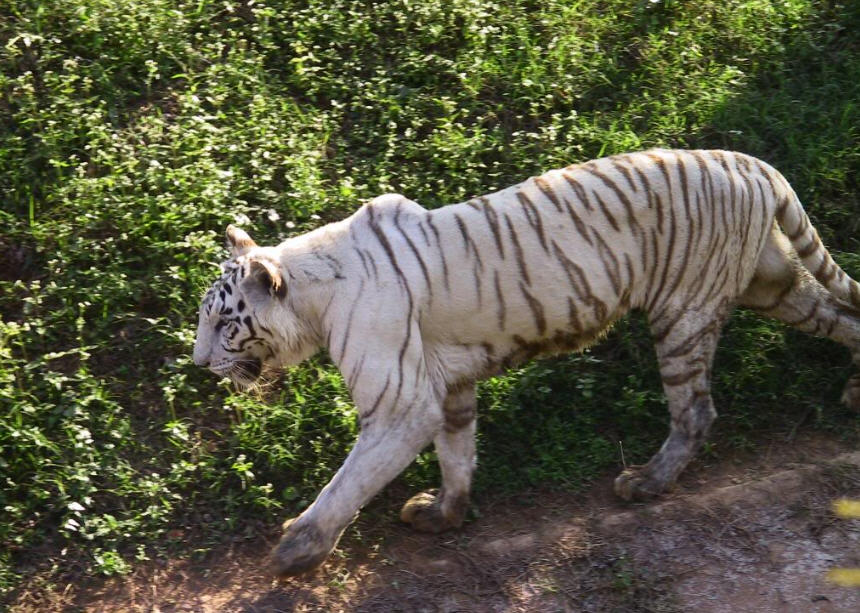
White tiger in Nandankanan Zoological Park

Odisha is the home to the royal Bengal tiger and feature many wildlife sanctuaries and natural scenic spots.

=== Beaches ===
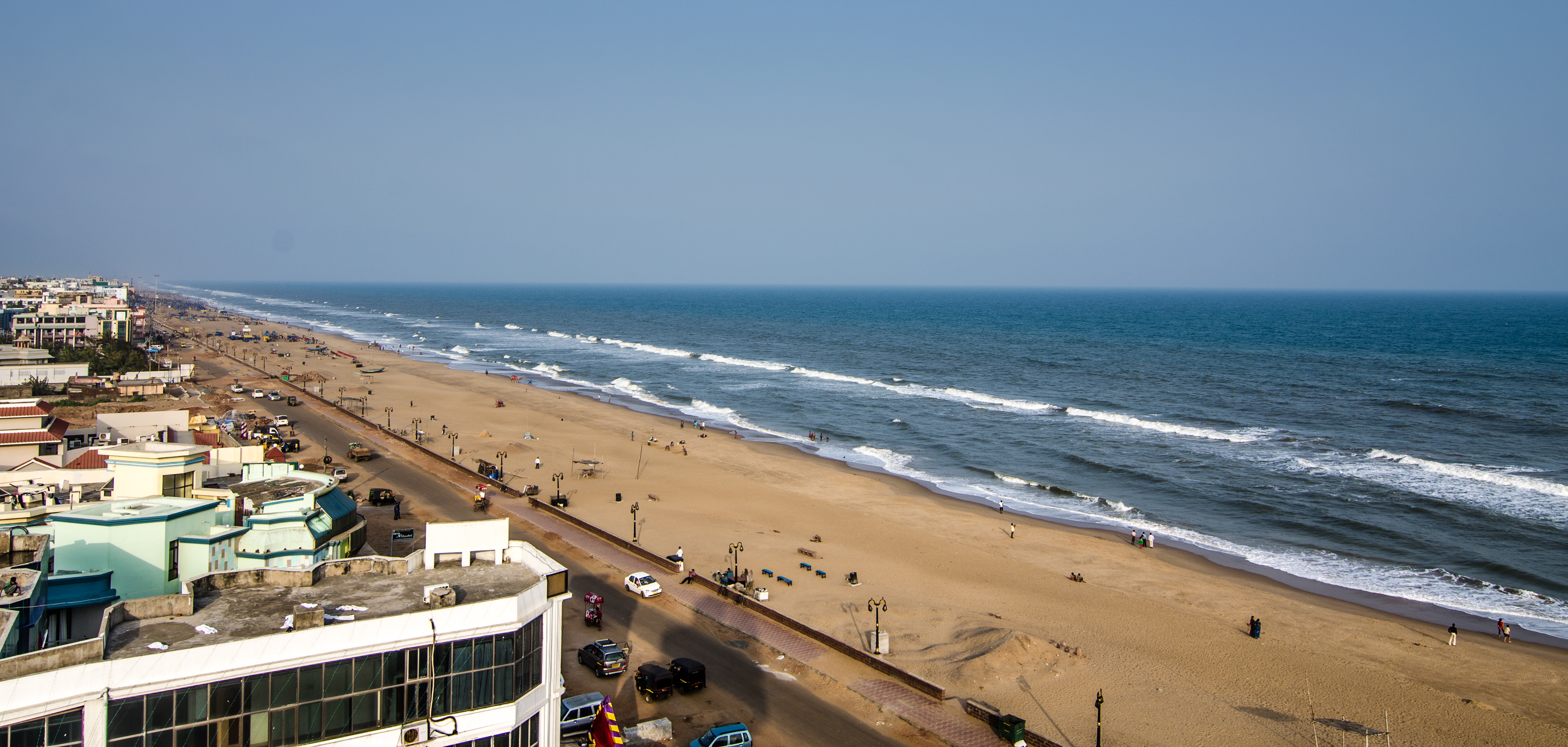
View of Puri Beach

Odisha has a long coastline of 500 kilometres (310 mi). Notable beaches on this coastline include:

- Gopalpur Beach
- Pati Sonepur Beach
- Chandipur Beach
- Chandrabhaga Beach
- Gahirmatha Beach
- Puri Beach
- Talasari Beach

=== Sanctuaries ===
- Baisipalli Wildlife Sanctuary
- Balimela Wildlife Sanctuary
- Balukhand-Konark Wildlife Sanctuary
- Bhitarkanika Mangroves
- Bhitarkanika National Park
- Khalasuni Wildlife Sanctuary
- Chandaka Elephant Sanctuary
- Debrigarh Wildlife Sanctuary
- Hadgarh Wildlife Sanctuary
- Karlapat Wildlife Sanctuary
- Kondakameru Wildlife Sanctuary
- Lakhari Valley Wildlife Sanctuary
- Nandankanan Zoological Park
- Satkosia Tiger Reserve
- Sunabeda Tiger Reserve

=== Scenic spots ===
- Daringbadi
- Barunei
- Dhamra
- Chandbali
- Gupteswar Cave
- Tensa
- Saptasajya
- Satabhaya
- Balda Cave

== Islands ==
Eco-tourism provides a degree of alternate employment to the local community and generates environmental awareness among local residents as well as visitors about the conservation and sensible use of the lake's natural resources. Notable locations within the lake are:

- Ramba Bay at the southern end of the lake with the group of islands including:
- The Becon Island, with an architectural conical pillar (to put a light on the top) built by Mr. Snodgrass, the then collector of Ganjam of the East India Company, on a mass of rock in the Rambha Bay near Ghantasila hill. It is surrounded by the Eastern Ghat.
- The Breakfast Island, pear shaped, known as "Sankuda island", with remnants of a dilapidated bungalow constructed by the King of Kalikote, has rare plants and is full of greenery with appealing flora.
- Honeymoon Island, 5 km (3.1 mi) from Rambha Jetty, known as Barkuda Island, with clear waters has abundant red and green macro algae in the bed is also known for the limbless lizard, an endemic species found here.
- Somolo and Dumkudi islands, located in the Central and Southern sectors of the lake, in the backdrop of scenic Khalikote hill range, are inundated remnants of the Eastern Ghats with rich flora and fauna and also known for sighting of Irrawaddy dolphins.
- Birds' island, located in the southern sector of the lake has huge exposed hanging rocks, are painted white due to folic acid of the droppings of the birds and is known for rich algal communities and few mangrove species and also migratory birds in winter.
- Parikud is a group of composite islands in the Garh Krishnaprasad Block for nature lovers and provides an avian spectacle during winter season.
- Kalijai Temple located on an island is considered to be the abode of the Goddess Kalijai.
- Satpada, at the new mouth of the lake, provides views of the lake and the dolphins. Hundreds of boats here provide tours of the lake for tourists.
- Barunkuda, a small island situated near Magarmukh, mouth of the lake, has a temple of Lord Varuna.
- Nabagraha is an ancient deity located along the outer channel.
- Chourbar Shiva Temple is located near Alupatna village, along the outer channel.
- Manikpatna, located on the outer channel has historical evidence of a port which was used for trade with Far East and also has the Bhabakundeswar temple of Lord Shiva, an old Mosque whose entrance door is made of the jaws of the whale.
- Sand-Bar and Mouth of the Lake is a striking and un-explored stretch of 30 km (18.6 mi) of empty beach across the sand bar which separates the lake from the sea.

== Museums ==
- Odisha State Museum
- Regional Museum of Natural History, Bhubaneswar
- Tribal Research Institute Museum
- Odisha Crafts Museum
- Black Diamond Museum and Library, Angul

== Western Odisha ==
During the ancient times, many small kingdoms existed now known as Western Odisha, which was ruled by local chieftains. Western Odisha, or the western part of Odisha, extends from the Bolangir district in the south to the Sundargarh district in the north. Some of the tourist attractions in the area include:-

- Samaleswari Temple (Samlei Gudi) is a 17th-century shrine dedicated to the goddess Maa Samaleswari, the tutelary goddess of the Kosal region. Samalei Gudi is the second most visited temple in the present Odisha state after Puri Jagannath Temple.
- Huma is famous for the Leaning Temple of Lord Shiva, which is relatively older and leans like the Leaning Tower of Pisa. Catching fish is not allowed and tradition holds that if one kills any fish from the river which flows behind Huma Temple, one will become a stone statue.
- Ushakothi is a wildlife sanctuary harboring elephants, tigers, gaurs, sambars, black panthers, deer, spotted deer, bears, and other animals.
- Hirakud Dam is situated 16 km from Sambalpur and is one of the longest dams in the world, about 16 mi (26 km) in length and the dam extends across a lake, 55 km long.

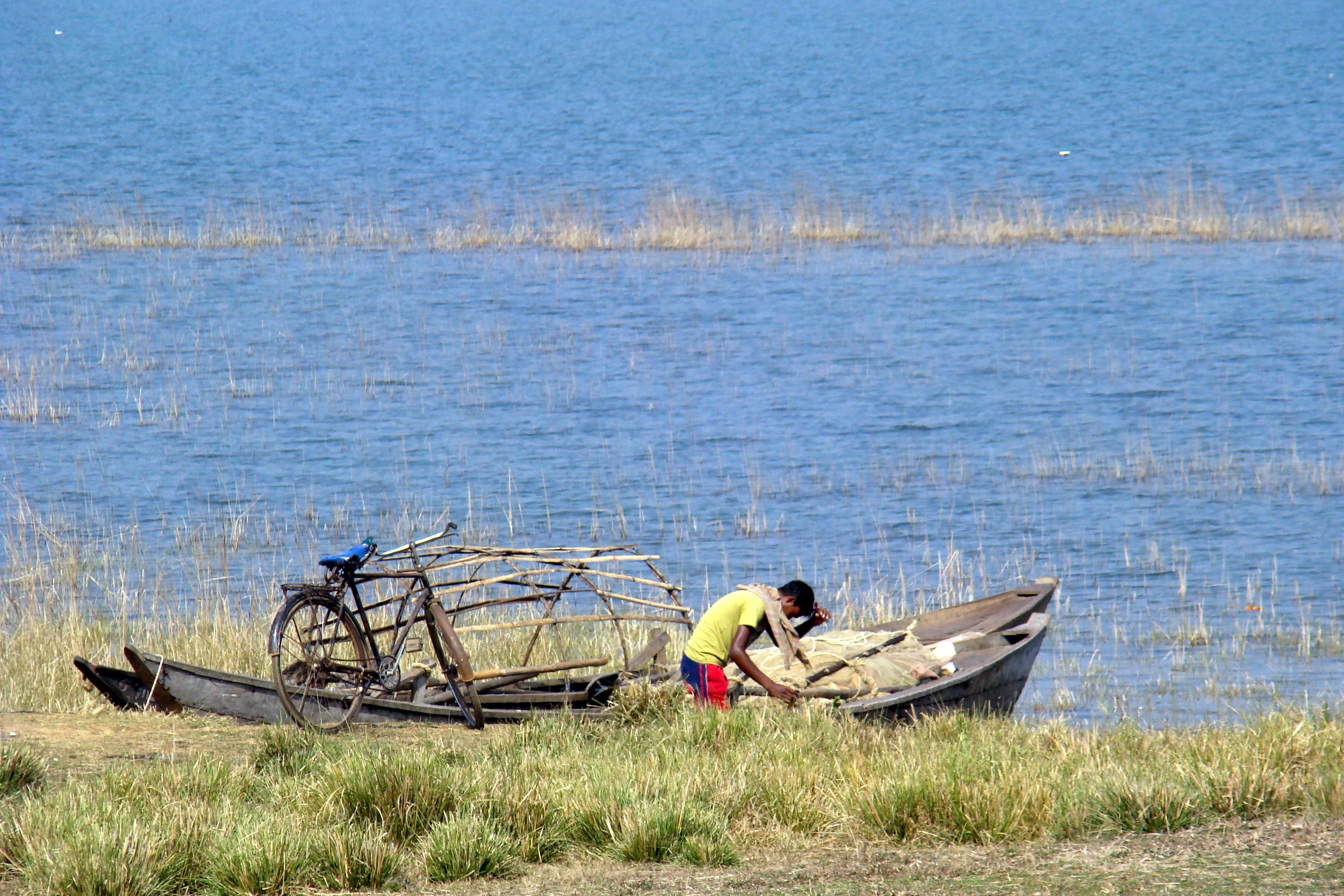
Fisherman at Hirakud Dam

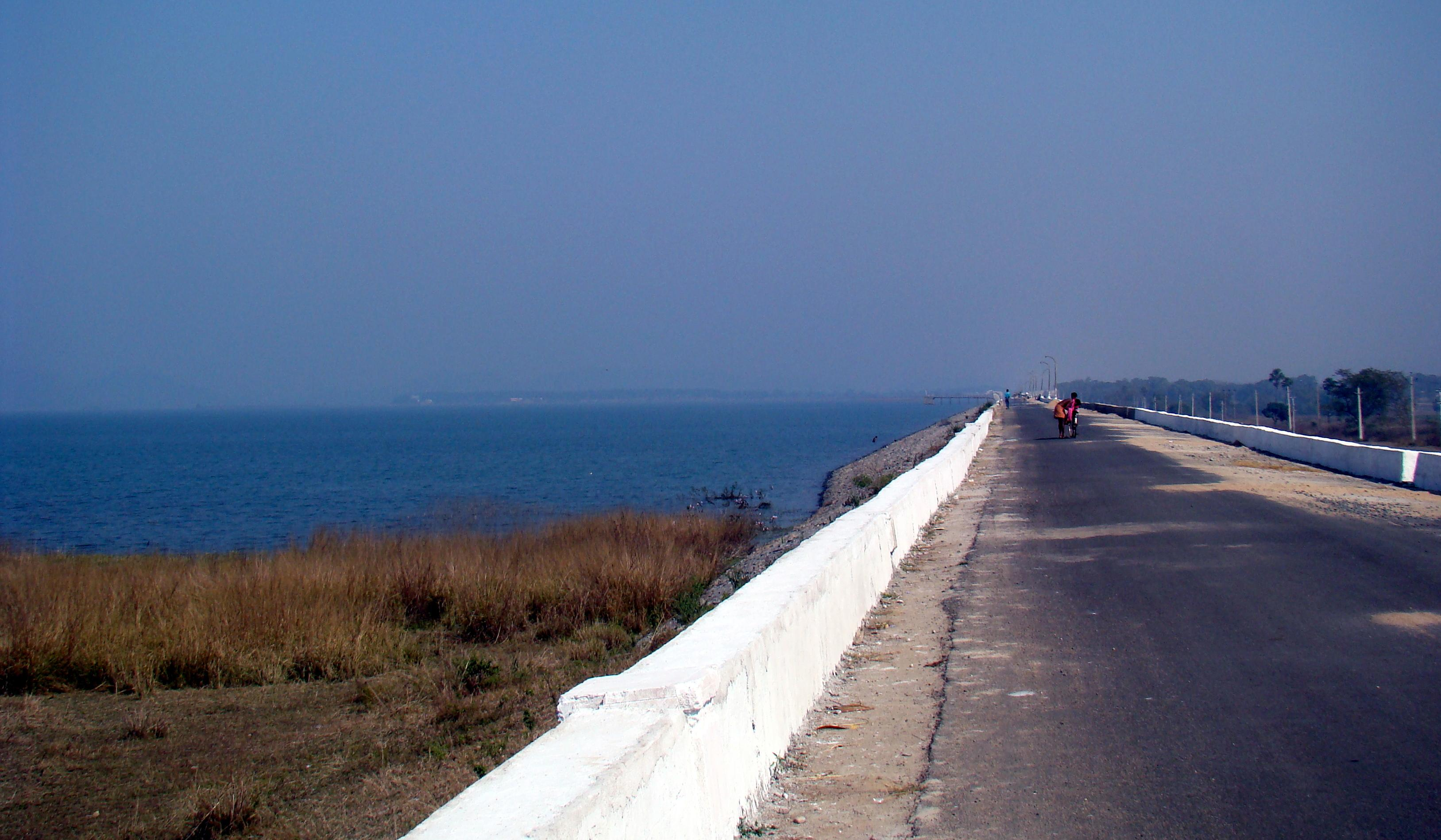
Left Dyke of Hirakud Dam

- Kandhara is the birthplace of the poet Bhima Bhoi, the great propounder of Mahima Dharma, and a pilgrimage-cum-sight seeing spot.
- Debrigarh Wildlife Sanctuary is located near Hirakud Reservoir. Made a sanctuary in 1985, it comprises Lohara Reserve Forest, Lohara and Debrigarh Reserve Forests of Barapahad Hills. Debrigarh means “The abode of the Goddess”. It is 40 km from Sambalpur. Dhodrokusum, the main entry gate, is 12 km from Hirakud Reservoir, at the end of the right dyke of Hirakud Dam. At Debrigarh, there are vehicle safaris and boat rides available to view more than 50,000 migratory birds from Siberia and other cold regions. It is a natural habitat for jaguars, sambars, black panthers, deer, spotted deer, and wild bears.
- Sambalpur city has several temples of Liakhai, Madanmohan, Satyabadi, Bariha, Brahampura, Dadhibamana, Timini, Gopalji, Budharaja Shiva Temple, Maneswar Shiva Temple, Gupteswar, Balunkeswar, Loknath, the Goddess Samaleswari, Pataneswari, Batmangala, Budhimaa, Mahamayi, and others, as well as Sambalpuri handlooms.

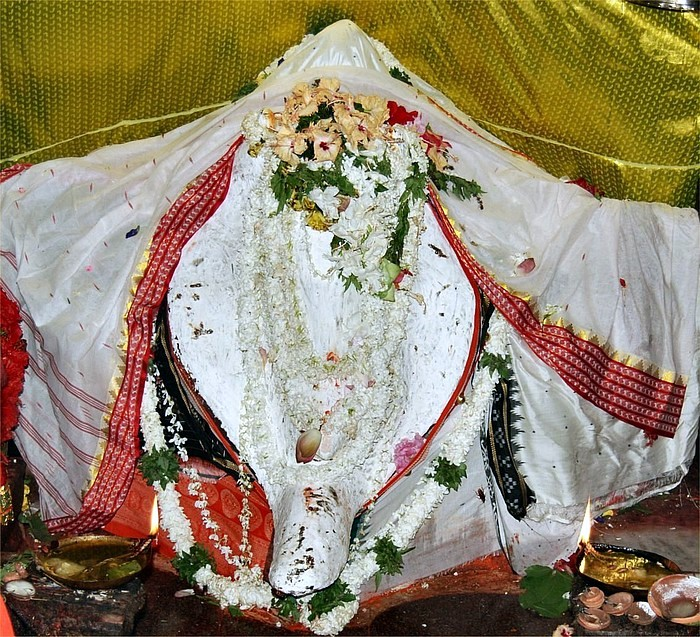
Maa Samalei, the reigning deity, after which the city of Sambalpur derives its name.

- Nrusinghanath is a place in Paikmal, with a waterfall and it is one of the most popular tourist places in the western Odisha region. A 500-year-old temple dedicated to the Hindu god Narasimha is also situated there. One more interesting fact is that God is worshiped here in the form of a cat as compared to the general Lion-man idol of the god. The God Narsimha is known here as "Marzara Kesari" in the Sambalpuri.
- Balangir is the modern capital of the ex-Patna State and its current district headquarters. It has numerous Sambalpuri Saree shops, Samaleswari Temple, Patneswari Temple, Nrusinghanath Temple, Santoshi Mata Temple, Gopal Jee Temple, Sailashree Palace, and Rajendra Park.
- Patnagarh is the ancient capital of the kingdom of Patna and has a 12th-century Someswar Siva Temple and Patneswari Temple.
- Ranipur-Jharial is famous for the Hypaethral Temple of sixty-four yoginis and for being a place of confluence of religious faiths, including Saivism, Buddhism, Vaisnavism and Tantrism.
- Kusangei Temple in Kusang is an 11th-century temple of Maa Kusangei and it is a fine example of the Kosali architecture.
- Harishankar is the most popular tourist place in Kosal. It is famous for its 15th-century Vishnu, Shiva, and Bhairavi Temple. It stands on the southern slope of the Gandhamardan Hills, which are complemented by a perennial stream. It is also known for its natural sliding rock where one can waterslide while having a bath under the waterfall.
- Three remarkable Buddhist statues are situated in Boudh town.
- Shyamsundarpur village and Pragalapur village are from the 9th century.
- Pradhanpat Waterfall.
- Vikramkhol is a site with pictographic inscriptions.
- Koilighugar Waterfall is located at Lakhanpur.
- Patalganga, Pataleswar Temple, Saliha smriti, Patora Dam, Thikali Dam - all located in Nuapada district.
- Sonepur town is known as the ‘Second Varanasi of India’ abode. There are several temples and gardens, including Suvarnameru, which is on the left bank of the river Tel, towards the southwest of its confluence with the river Mahanadi.
- The Thengo Dam is the picnic spot that is present in the surrounding dense forest. The wildlife and environment here attracts hundreds of nature lovers every year.
- Khaliapali is a Mahima shrine.
- Khandadhar falls

== Odisha Tourism Development Corporation ==
The Odisha Tourism Development Corporation promotes tourism in the state and operates some of the existing tourist bungalows and transportation fleets. OTDC's tourist bungalows are called panthanivas. The Odisha Forest Development Corporation manages the eco-tourism destinations in the state.

=== Locations of panthanivas ===
- Balasore
- Berhampur
- Bhubaneswar
- Chandaneswar
- Chandabali
- Chandipur
- Chilika Lake
- Cuttack
- Dhauli
- Gopalpur
- Kendujhar
- Konark
- Panchalingeshwar
- Paradip
- Puri
- Rourkela
- Sambalpur
- Satpada
- Similipal
- Taptapani

== Gallery ==
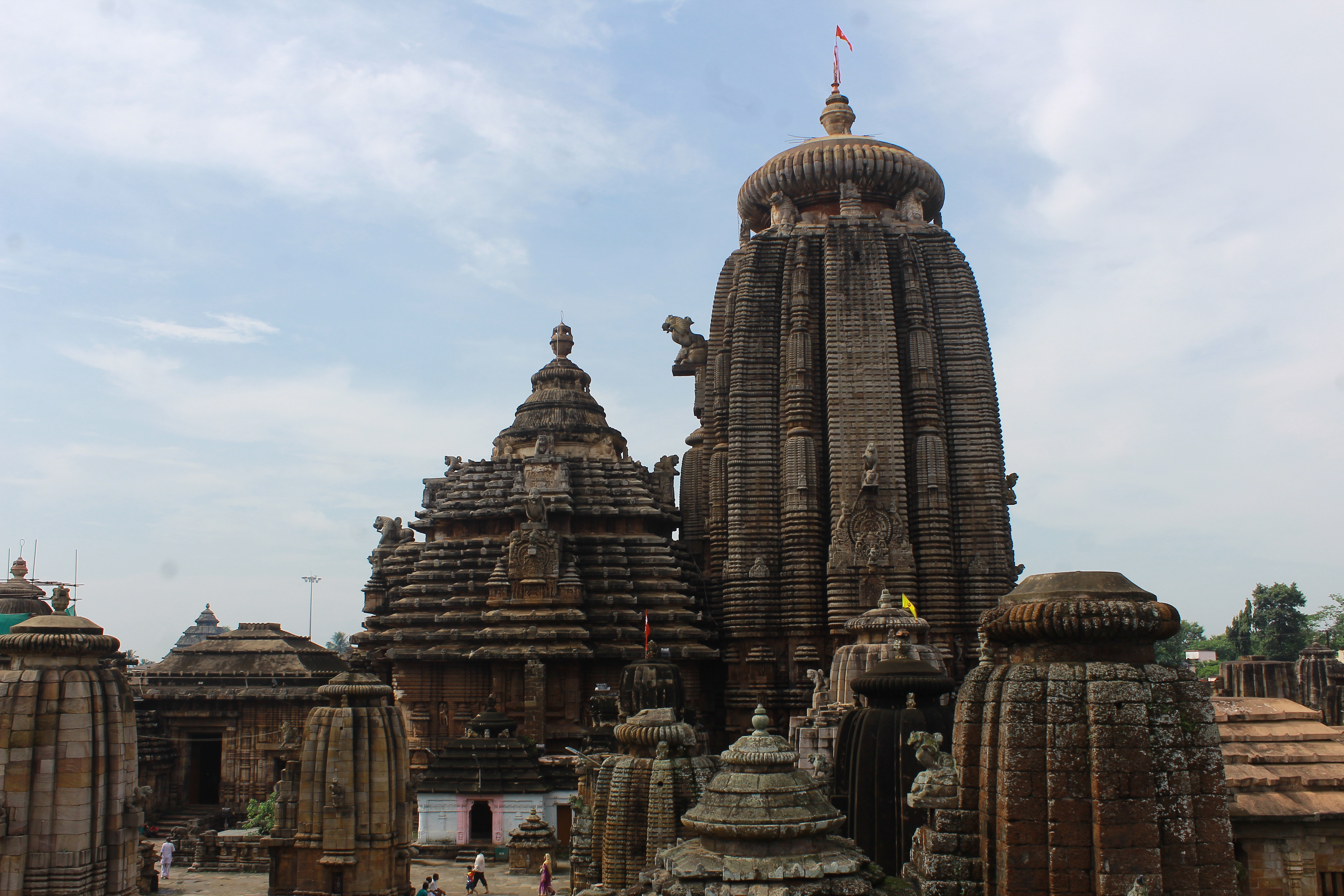
Lingaraja Temple

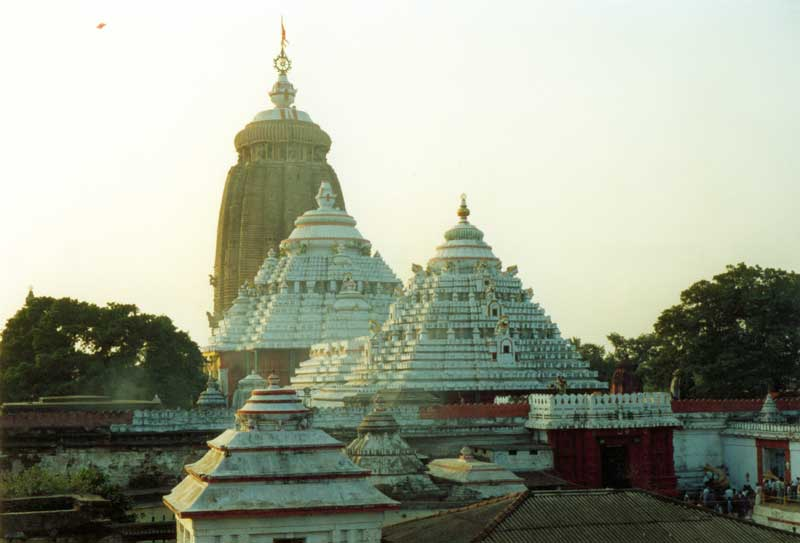
The Jagannath Temple

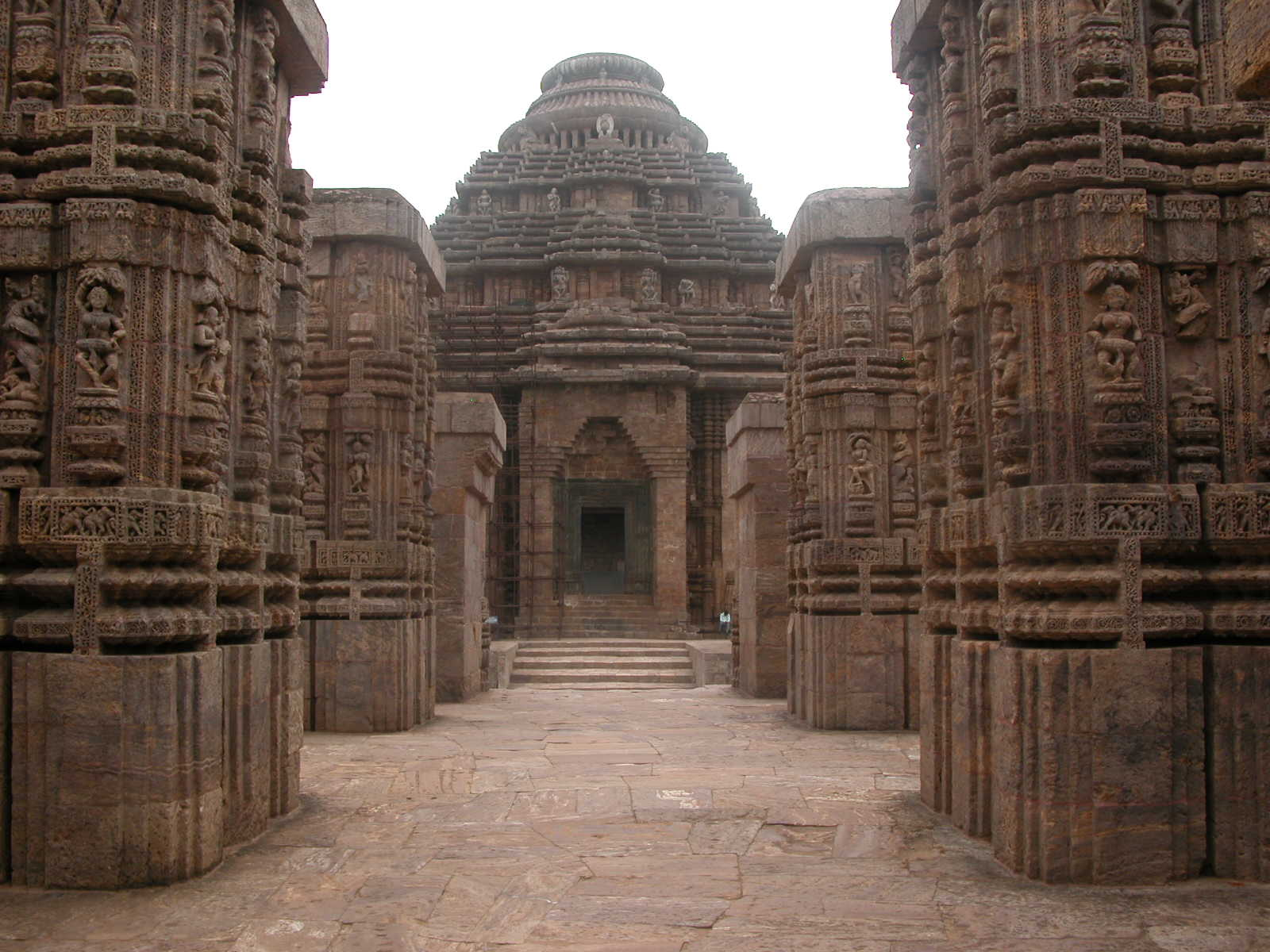
Konark Sun Temple, a UNESCO World Heritage Site

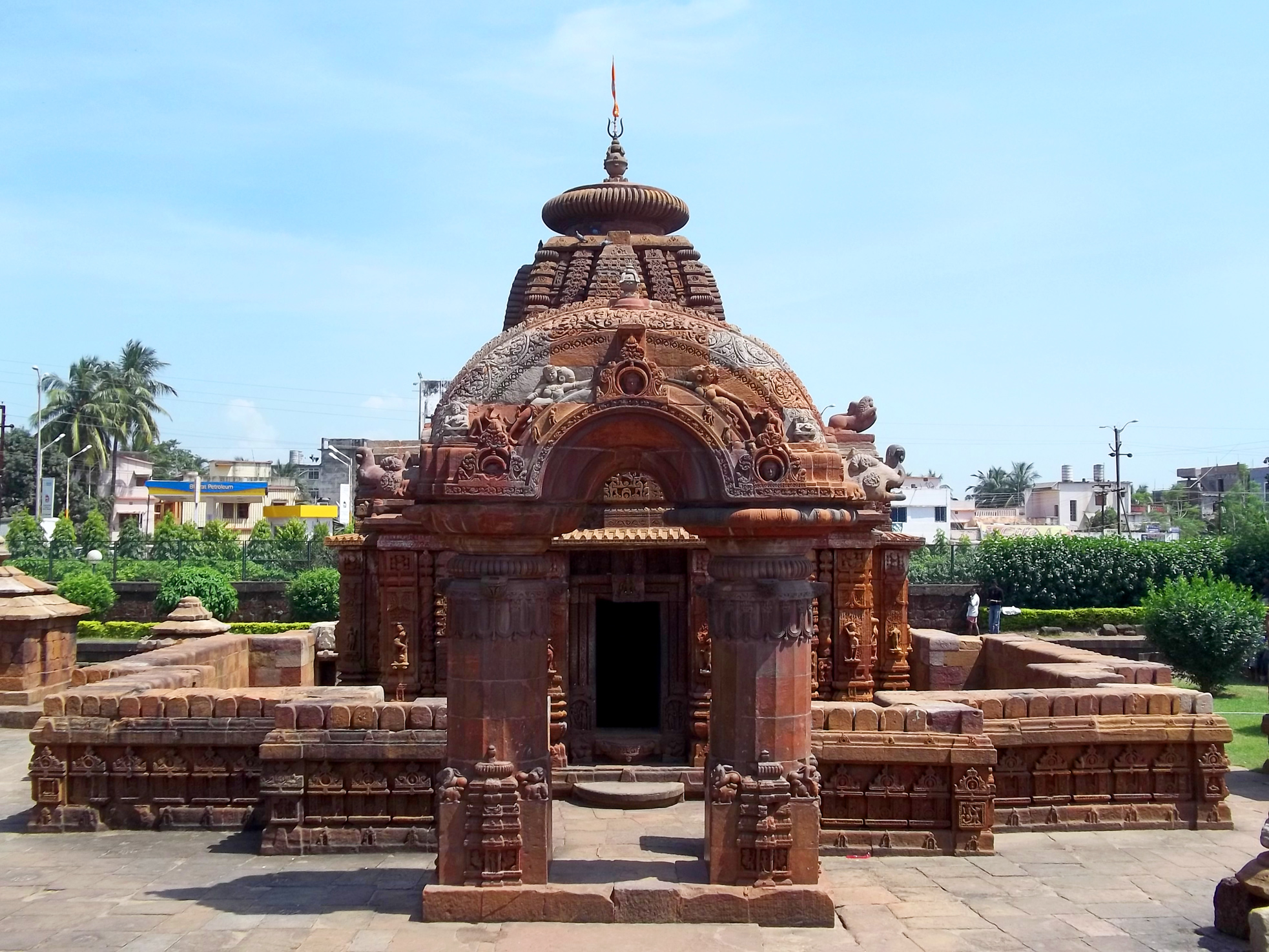
Muktesvara deula

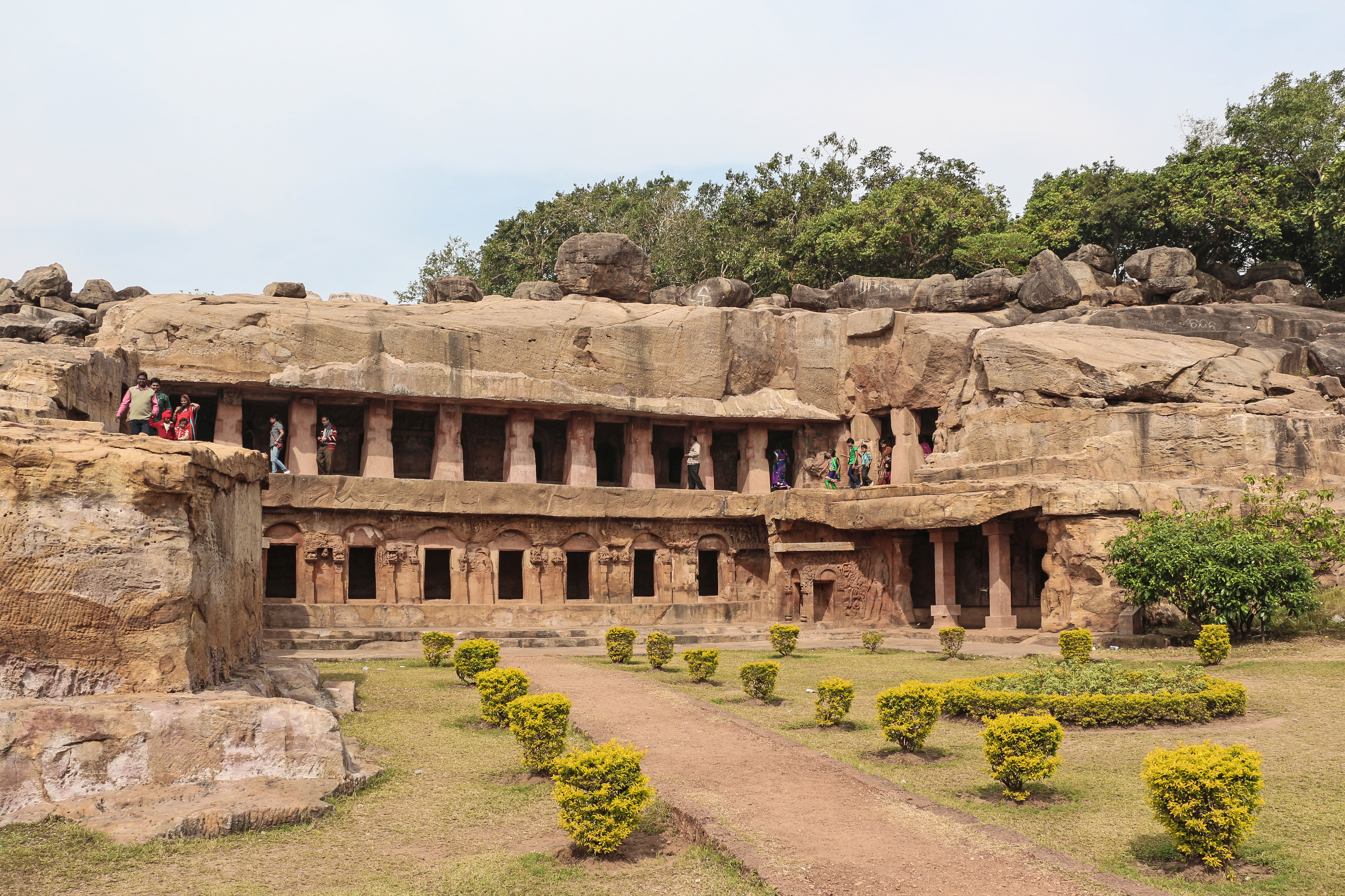
Udayagiri and Khandagiri Caves, 2nd Century BCE

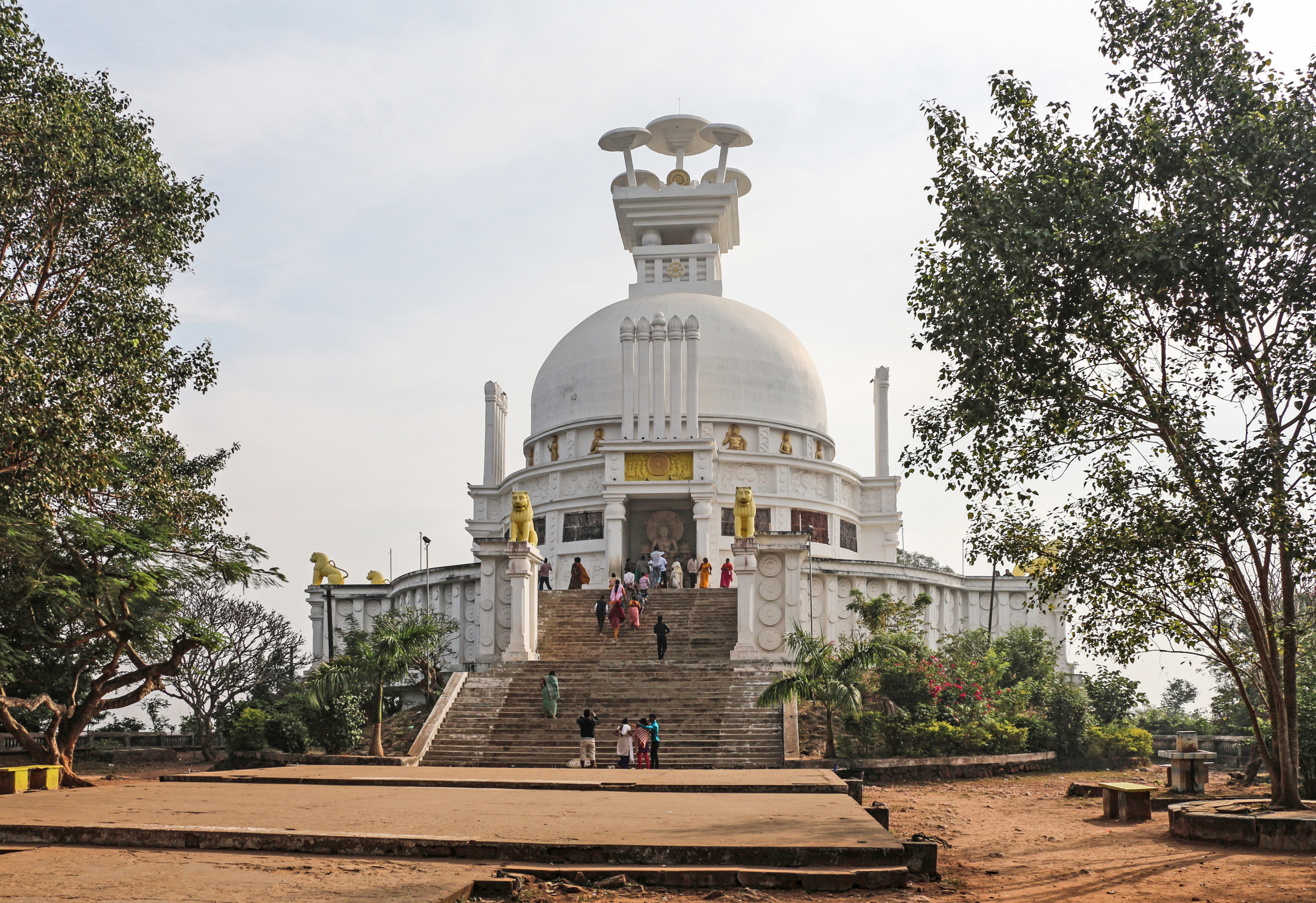
Shanti Stupa at Dhauli

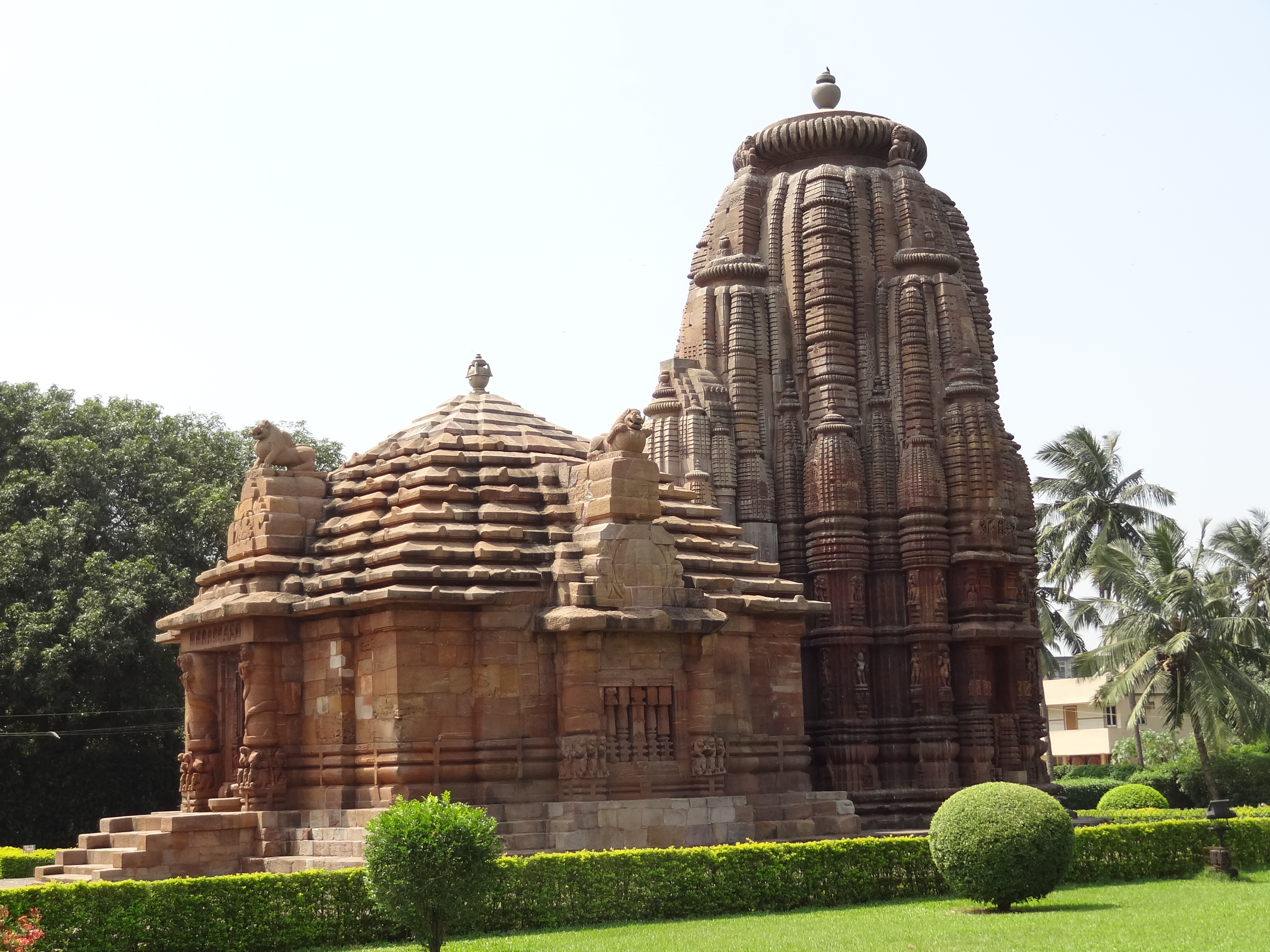
Rajarani Temple

== See also ==
- Outline of tourism in India
