= Kalika Siva Temple =

Coordinates: 20.228814°N 85.827492°E

Bakresvara / Kalika Siva Temple / Tirthesvara Temple The Kalika Siva Temple (Lat- 200 13’ 74" N., Long- 850 49’ 65" E., Elev- 45 ft.) is located beyond the southern compound wall of Kapilesvara siva temple and close to the northern embankment of Manikarnika tank.The temple is facing towards west and the presiding deity of the temple is a Siva lingam within a circular yonipitha. The temple is made of sandstone. It was built around 10th / 11th Century A.D.

== Structure ==
- Surrounding

The temple is surrounded by Bhaskaresvara Siva temple on its west Kapilesvara temple compound wall on its east, Manikarnika tank on its south and Kapilesvara gate way on its north.

- Architectural features (Plan and Elevation)

On plan the temple has a vimana and a frontal porch. Vimana is 2.50 square metres and the frontal porch is 0.35 metres. The temple is in pidha order. On elevation, the temple has a bada, gandi and mastaka. Bada is trianga measuring 1.55 metres (pabhaga 0.39 metres, jangha 0.79 metres and baranda 0.37 metres). Gandi has three receding tiers measuring 1.50 metres, mastaka 0.90 metres. Total height is 3.95 metres. The sanctum is square on plan measuring 1.25 square metres. It was repaired by Orissa state Archaeology under X and XI Finance Commission Award and presently maintained by Kapilesvara Trust Board.

- Raha niche & parsva devatas

The parsvadevata niches are located on the raha paga of the tala jangha on the three sides of north, west and south measure 0.38 metres x 0.31 metres x 0.10 metres in depth. All of them are empty.

- Grade

Classification	Grade
Architecture	B
Historic	C
Associational	A
Social/Cultural	C
