= Bhuvaneshwar Temple, Boudh =

Coordinates: 20.844198°N 84.316264°E

Bhuvaneshwar Temple

Religion
- Affiliation: Hinduism
- District: Boudh
- Deity: Lord (Shiva)

Location
- Location: Boudh
- State: Odisha, India
- Country: India
- Interactive map of Bhuvaneshwar Temple

Architecture
- Completed: 10th Century

Bhuvaneshwar Temple is located in Malipara in the Boudh township of Odisha, India. On the left side of road leading from Boudh to Sonepur, it is situated on the right bank of Mahanadi. It can be assigned to 10th Century, during Somavamsi rule. Decorated with architectural motifs like – khakharamundis, divine figures like Ganesha and Jaina Tirthankaras, semi-divine figures, nayikas, image of Linga puja, human figures both male and female, bharabahaka, decorative motifs like scroll work, beaded border, lattice pattern, padmaprosta motifs, mohanty design, vajramundi, animals, mithuna and maithuna. Nataraja and Brahma idols are also found. It can be categorized as Rekha deula of South Kosalan style. Shivaratri, Shitalasasthi and all Purnimas are important days here.
