= Taptapani =

Hot spring in Odisha, India

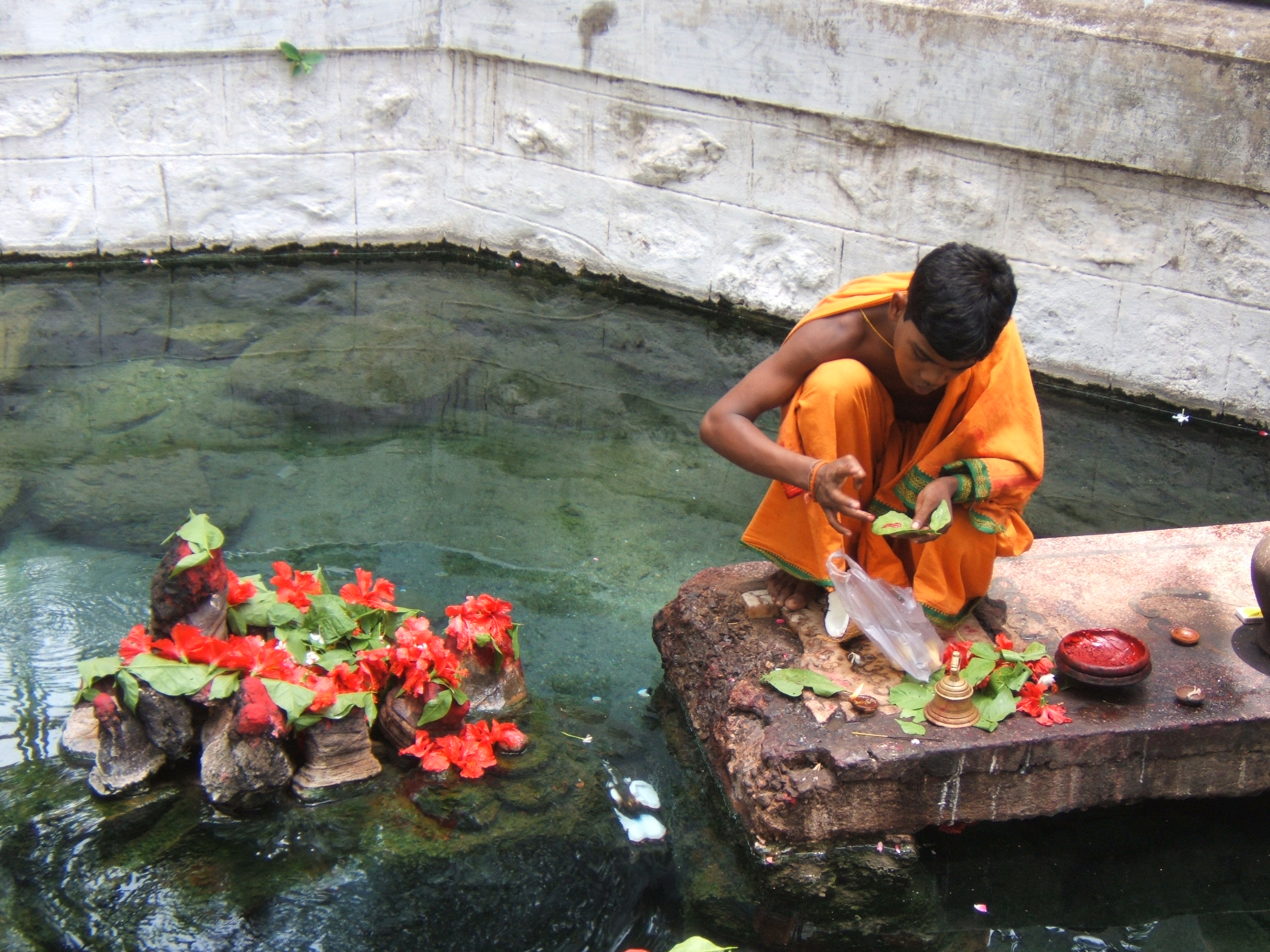
- A Young Hindu priest performing religious rituals at Taptapani hot spring

- Location within Odisha
- Interactive map of Taptapani
- Location: Ganjam district, Odisha
- Coordinates: 19.4840396°N 84.3936437°E
- Elevation: 433 metres (1,421 ft)
- Type: Sulfur
- Temperature: 60–140 °C (140–284 °F)

Taptapani is famous for its hot sulfur water spring, present in Sanakhemundi Block of Ganjam district in Odisha state. But, the nearest town is Mohana, which about 18 km away in Gajapati district.

== Etymology ==
The name "Taptapani" also suggests that. "Tapta" means hot and "pani" means water.

== Hot spring ==
The hot water from the natural spring of Taptapani is attributed to medicinal properties due to the presence of sulphur. The hot spring is situated at the eastern slope of the eastern ghat at the crest of the hill within the forest, having a wide range of flora and fauna.
