= Mangala Temple =

Mangala temple

Religion
- Affiliation: Hinduism
- Deity: Maa Durga

Location
- Location: Bhubaneswar
- State: Orissa
- Country: India
- Interactive map of Mangala temple
- Coordinates: 20.364208°N 85.820960°E

Architecture
- Type: Kalingan style (Kalinga architecture)
- Completed: 19th century A.D.

Mangala Temple was constructed in the 19th century CE and is located in Village Patia in Bhubaneswar, the capital of Odisha. The enshrined deity is the four-armed Mangala. The deity holds a conch in her upper right hand and a wheel in her lower left hand. The upper left hand of the deity assumes the varadamudra, while her lower right hand assumes the abhayamudra. The deity stands on a pedestal. The temple is located in the Harijan sahi (a residential ward restricted to Harijans) of Patia, whose residents maintain it.

== Physical description ==
=== Surrounding ===
The temple is surrounded by a concrete hall to the east and residential buildings to the west, north and south side.

=== Architectural features ===
The temple stands on a low and square platform, measuring 2.90 square metres and bearing a height of 0.43 meters. On plan, the temple has a square vimana in the dimension. On elevation, the vimana is a pidha deula having a bada, gandi and mastic that measures 4.56 metres (15.0 ft) in height. With the three-fold division of bada, the temple has a triangabada measuring 1.61 metres (5.3 ft) in height (pabhaga- 0.41 meters, jangha - 1.00 meters, baranda-0.20 meters.) The gandi measures 1.50 metres (4.9 ft) in height. The traditional components of the mastaka, such as the beki, amalaka and kalasa, measures 1.45 meters in height.

=== Building techniques ===
It is built with laterite by Ashlar masonry, cement plaster and white wash construction techniques in the Kalingan style.

== See also ==
- Chandrasekhara Mahadeva Temple
- Kakatpur Mangala Temple
- List of temples in Bhubaneswar
