= Papanasini Siva Temple =

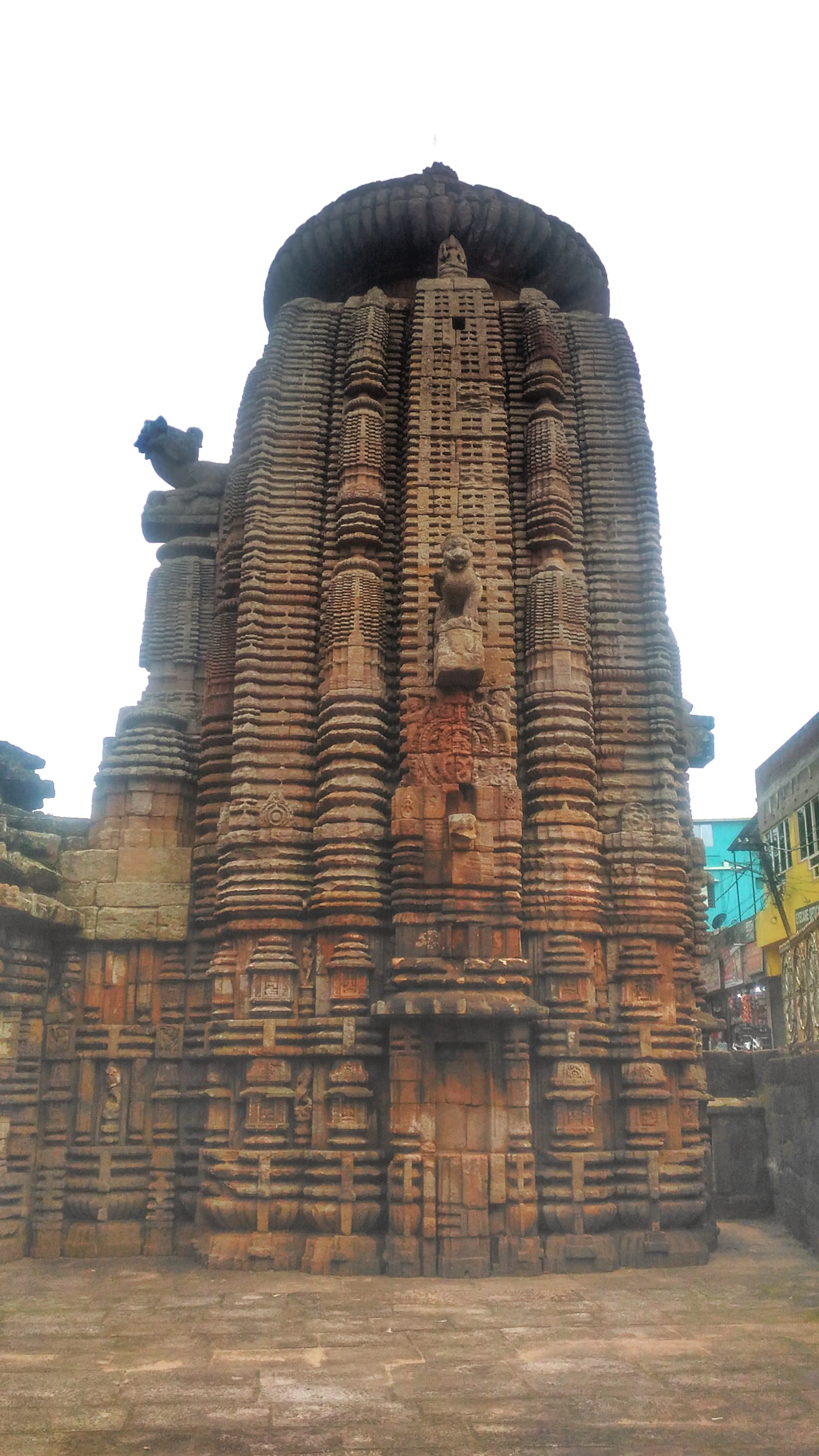

- Location in Orissa

Religion
- Affiliation: Hinduism
- Deity: lord Siva

Location
- Location: Bhubaneswar
- State: Odisha
- Country: India
- Interactive map of Papanasini Siva Temple
- Coordinates: 20°14′38″N 85°50′38″E

Architecture
- Type: Kalingan Style (Kalinga Architecture)
- Completed: 11th century
- Elevation: 14 m (46 ft)

Papanasini Siva Temple is an abandoned Hindu temple located in Bhubaneswar, Odisha, India.

== Location ==
The Papanasini Siva temple is located in the Papanasini precinct, Badheibanka Chowk, Old Town, Bhubaneswar, at an elevation of 45 feet (14 m). The temple faces towards the south. It is an abandoned temple and the sactum is empty. The temple is made of laterite.

== History ==
According to architectural features, this temple was built in 11the century.

== Architecture ==
This is a precinct and typology is Pidha deul.

Surrounding : The temple is surrounded by Banesvara Siva temple in east, Maitresvara temple in south and the Papanasini compound wall in north and west.

Orientation: The temple is facing towards south.

Architectural features (Plan and Elevation): On plan, the temple has a square vimana that measures 2.50 square metres. On elevation, the vimana is of pidha order measuring 4.16 metres in height. With fivefold divisions of the bada the temple has a panchanga bada that measures 2.06 metres in height (pabhaga 0.55 metres, talajangha 0.40 metres, bandhana 0.23 metres, upara jangha 0.42 metres and baranda 0.46 metres). Gandi 1.15 metres and mastaka measures 0.95 metres.

Raha niche & parsva devatas: The parsvadevata niches in north, west and eastern walls measure 0.40 metres in height x 0.28 metres in width x 0.10 metres depth. All the niches are empty.

Decorative features: —

- Door Jambs: The doorjambs measuring 1.58 metres x 0.73 metres are plain.
- Building material: Laterite.
- Construction techniques: Dry masonry
- Style: Kalingan
- Special features: No porch only the vimana.

== Conservation ==
It is in bad state of preservation and shows signs of deterioration. The eastern wall has collapsed.

Condition description: Cracks have developed in all sides of the walls. Since the kalasa is broken rain water percolates from the roof. (Reference: Dr. Sadasiba Pradhan and team Dated on 23.09.2006) Paramaguru Siva Temple

Location: It is located at Lat. 200 14’ 54" N., Long. 850 49’ 95" E and at Elevation of . 74 ft. Approach: The Paramaguru Siva temple is situated in the private land of Rabindra Paramaguru located on the right side of Ratha road, leading from Lingaraja temple to Ramesvara temple, Old Town, Bhubaneswar. It is situated 20.00 metres north of Vaital temple and 100 metres south of Gosagaresvara precinct. The temple is facing towards east. The enshrined deity is a Siva lingam within a circular yonipitha with Vaishnavite sculpture on the outer walls of the temple. It is a living temple and looked after by the family members of Paramguru, even though there is a gate mentioning the name of Archaeological Survey of India.

Ownership: It is privately owned and looked after by Rabindra Paramaguru.

Age: As per Architectural features and sculptural decoration it was formed in the 10th century.

Property Type: It is a building and typology is Rekha deul. Property use: It is currently used for worshipping purpose.

Significance Historic significance: Early phase of temple building in Bhubaneswar Cultural significance: Sivaratri, Somabara, Dolapurnima etc. are celebrated here.

Physical description Surrounding: It is surrounding by residential buildings in the northern and eastern sides and stakes of wood on the eastern side.

Orientation: The temple is facing towards east.

Architectural features (Plan and Elevation): On plan, the temple is pancharatha with a square vimana measuring 3.40 square metres and a frontal porch that measures 0.90 metres in length. On elevation, the vimana is of rekha order with only the bada whereas the superstructure has collapsed. On elevation, the bada has three divisions of trianga bada measuring 2.50 metres. Pabhaga with five conventional mouldings measure 0.80 metres, jangha 1.63 metres, and baranda with two mouldings 0.50 metres. The extent portion of the gandi measures 3.00 metres.

Raha niche & parsva devatas: The principal niches measuring 0.80 metres in height x 0.40 metres in width x 0.19 metres in depth are crowned with stylized chaityas and are empty. The subsidiary niche on the kanika pagas which is a pidha mundi enshrined with various incarnations of Visnu.

Decorative features: — Door Jambs: The doorjambs measures 1.80 metres in height x 1.2 metres in width is decorated with three plain vertical bands. Lintel: The architrave above the doorjamb measuring 2.30 metres is carved with traditional navagrahas. Building material: Sandstone. Construction techniques: Dry masonry Style: Kalingan Special features, if any: The subsidiary niches of the kanika paga enshrining with incarnations of Vishnu while the presiding deity is Siva lingam within a circular yonipitha in the sanctum.

State of preservation: It is showing signs of deterioration.

Condition description: The superstructure has partly collapsed up to gandi. The temple is crumbling on account of total negligence. Conservation Problem and Remedies: Needs immediate attention for conservation.
