= Maa Barunei Temple =

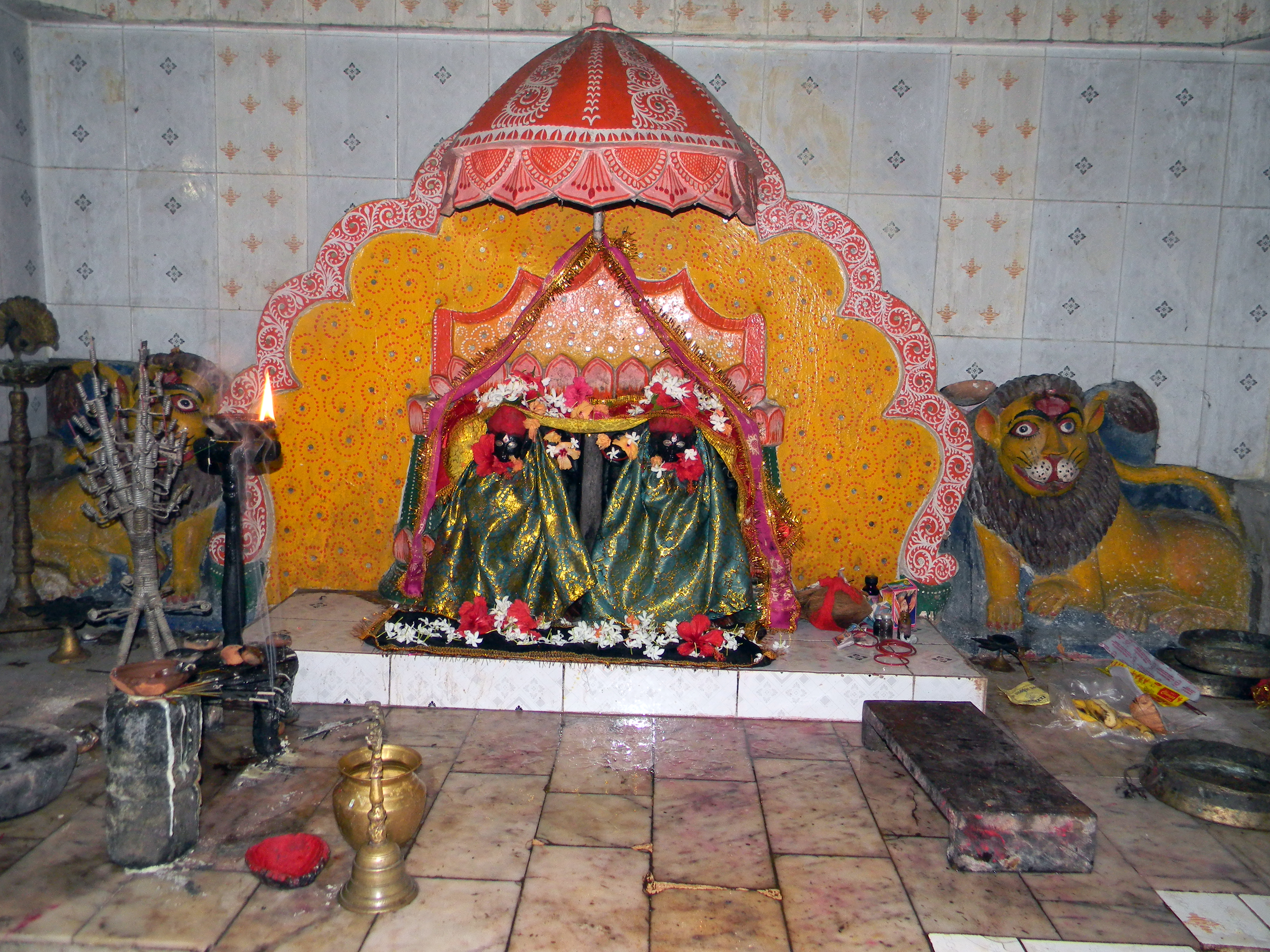
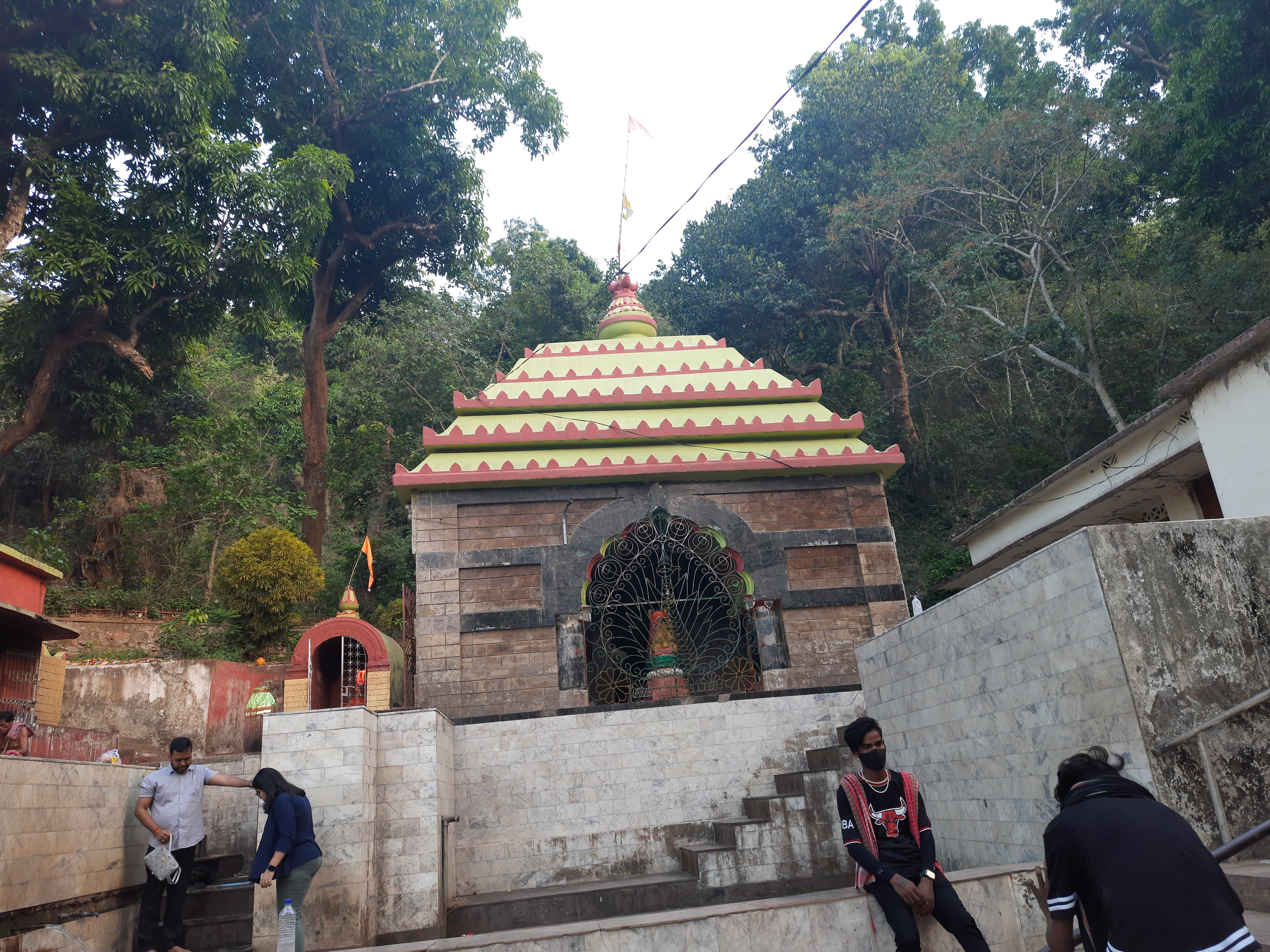
- Goddesses Barunei and Karunei Front view of Barunei Temple

Religion
- Affiliation: Hinduism
- District: Khordha 20.162037°N 85.647340°E
- Festival: Raja

Location
- State: Odisha
- Country: India
- Interactive map of Maa Barunei Temple

Maa Barunei Temple is a Hindu temple dedicated to the goddess Barunei, a manifestation of Shakti. The temple is located on the Barunei Hill in Khordha district of the Indian state of Odisha. The temple has idols of the twin goddesses Barunei and Karunei in the sanctum sanctorum.

A stream, known as Swarna Ganga, flows from the nearby hills.

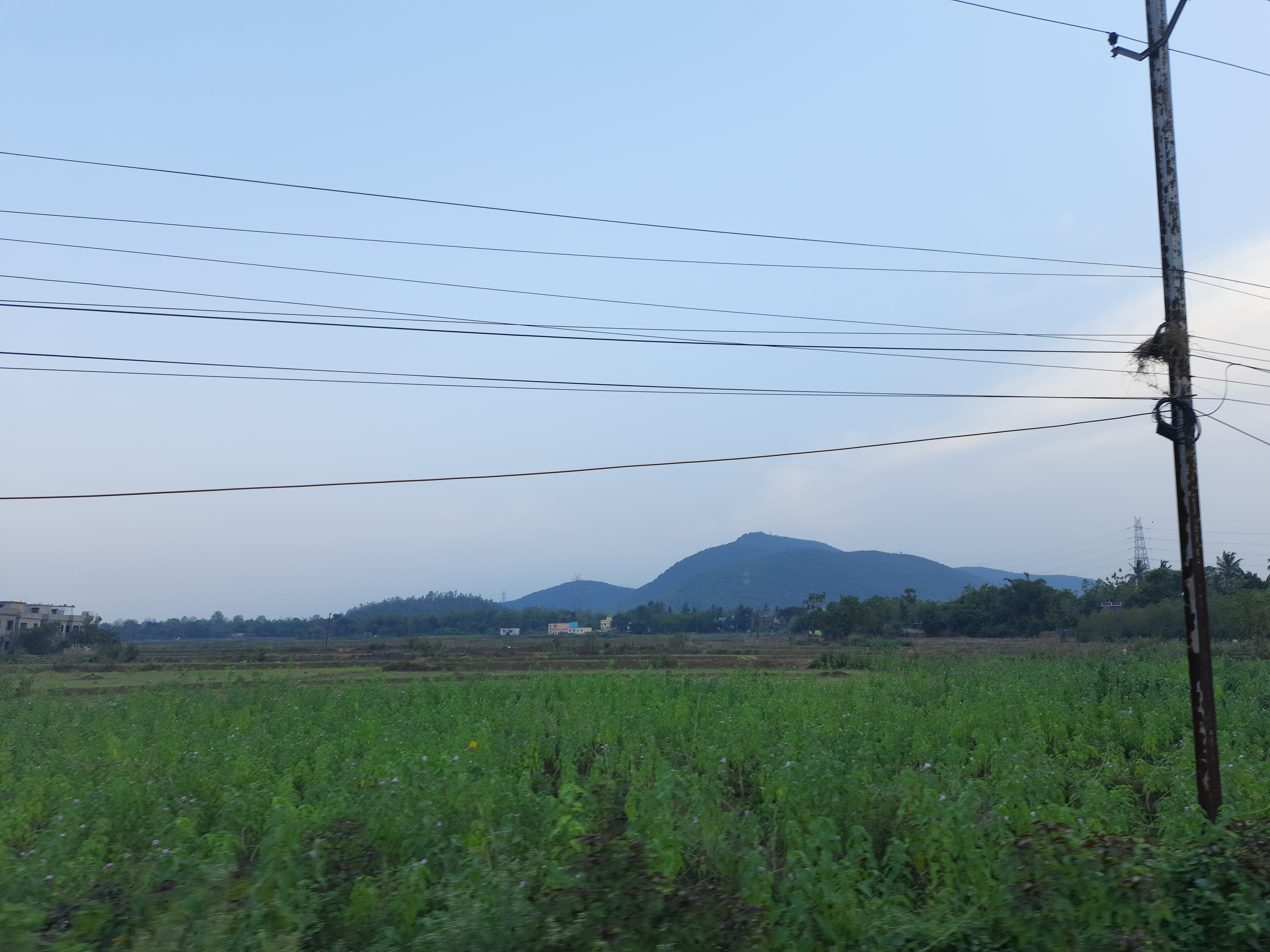
Barunei hills
