= Subarnesvara Siva Temple =

Subarnesvara Siva temple
- Location in Orissa

Religion
- Affiliation: Hinduism
- Deity: lord Shiva

Location
- Location: Bhubaneswar
- State: Orissa
- Country: India
- Interactive map of Subarnesvara Siva temple
- Coordinates: 20°14′27.92″N 85°50′14.12″E

Architecture
- Type: Kalingan Style (Kalinga Architecture)
- Elevation: 22 m (72 ft)

Subarnesvara Siva temple is situated on the left bank of the Lingaraja west canal, Bhubaneswar, Orissa, India. The east facing temple enshrines a Siva lingam within a circular yoni pitha in a sanctum measuring 2.35 square meters.

There is also a Sahasra Lingam in the south-eastern region of the temple. The other minor structures are an amalaka, octagonal Lingam and ornamental block of stone, carved with the image of the goddess Tarini.

== Etymology ==
The temple derives its name from settlements of goldsmiths who have historically lived around the Shiva temple. The name Subarnesvara is the vernacular rendition and derives itself from the root Sanskrit word "स्वर्ण " (swarna) meaning "gold".

== History ==
The temple was established approximately in 10th century CE during the Somavaṃshi rule in the region. Architectural features and scheme of decoration including the building material bears strong resemblance with other 10th century temples of Bhubaneswar.

== Significance ==
This temple holds as an important reference to the Somavamshis who were said, by locals, to have built the temple. Various festivals and occasions like Shivaratri, Sankranti, and Chaturdashi are observed at the temple.

== Orientation and Surroundings ==
Surrounding: The temple is surrounded by the approaching road on the east, Lingaraja west canal and paddy fields in south, Nageshvara temple across the canal in the west and residential buildings in north.

Orientation: The temple faces East.

== Architectural features ==
The temple stands over a low pedestal measuring 6.90 meters in length, 6.30 meters in width and 0.23 meters in height. Architecturally the temple is pancharatha with a square vimana and the front porch extending towards east. The vimana measures 5.45 square meters and the frontal porch 0.50 meters. On elevation, the temple is in rekha order measuring 11.58 meters in height from khura to kalasa with usual bada, gandi and mastaka. The bada measuring 3.48 meters in height has five vertical divisions namely pabhaga with four mouldings (0.92 meters), talajangha (0.86 meters), bandhana of single moulding (0.20 meters), upara jangha (0.75 meters) and the baranda with four mouldings (0.75 meters). The gandi above the baranda measuring 6.10 meters in height is distinguished by a central raha and a pair of anuratha and kanika pagas on either side of the raha, which is a curvilinear spire, and devoid of ornamentation. The mastaka as usual in Orissan temples has components like beki, amlaka, khapuri and kalasa that measures 2.00 meters in height.

== Parsva devatas ==
The parsvadevata niches are located on the raha paga of the talajangha on three sides of north, west and south measures 1 meter in height, 0.53 meters in width and 0.38 meters in depth are devoid of ornamentation.

== Decorative features ==
The base of the gandi is decorated with a series of miniature rekha deul as angasikharas on the pagas arranged in descending order from raha to the kanika paga. The baranda mouldings above the raha niche are relieved by chaitya motifs. Both the upara and tala jangha are decorated with a series of pilaster motifs in relief udyota simha finds place on the raha paga of the eastern wall doorjamb, except the dvarapala niches at the base the doorjamb are of recent additions made of plain sand stones. The doorjambs measure 2.20 meters in height and 1.60 meters in width. The dvarapala niches house Saivite dvarapalas holding trident in their left hand along with river goddess standing on their respective mounts. Yamuna in the right niche is provided with a parasol held by a diminutive female attendant. While the niches are crowned by stylized chaitya motifs at the top, beneath are figures of gaja kranta Lintel- The architrave above the doorjambs measuring 1.8 meters is carved with navagrahas, each housed in a niche. They are all seated in padmasana except Rahu and Ketu. The grahas are flanked by two atlantid ganas on both ends of the architrave.

== Current state and condition ==
Signs of distress are noticed - cracks on the roof and outer wall of the temple are significant.

Since the sanctum (cella) is 1.20 meters below the present ground level, there is seepage of water from the adjoining west canal during monsoon and heavy rains. The overflow of the adjoining west canal during rains leads to underground water stagnating inside the garbha griha that is weakening the temple foundation.

== See also ==
- List of temples in Bhubaneswar
