= Sundaresvara Tank =

- Location in Orissa

Religion
- Affiliation: Hinduism

Location
- Location: Bhubaneswar
- State: Orissa
- Country: India
- Interactive map of Sundaresvara Tank
- Coordinates: 20°14′06″N 85°49′18″E

Architecture
- Completed: 13th century AD
- Elevation: 16 m (52 ft)

Sundaresvara Tank is located in the south of Sundaresvara Siva temple across the Sundaresvara road, Old Town, Bhubaneswar, the capital of Orissa. It is now under the care and maintenance of Sri Sri Dadhivamana Sundaresvara Mahadeva Trust Board. The tank is enclosed within a masonry embankment made of dressed laterite blocks. The exact date when the tank was built could not be ascertained. However the tank may be earlier or contemporaneous to the Sundaresvara Siva Temple which is ascribed to the 13th Century A.D. The tank is in use for ritual as well as normal bathing. The tank is under the Endowment Department and Sri Sri Dadhivamana Sundaresvara Mahadeva Trust Board.

== Tradition and Legends ==
According to the local legend, the tank is named after the temple deity Sundaresvara Siva. It is so named may be because of the beautiful surrounding and environment.

== Significance ==
=== Historic significance ===
Late Gangas.

=== Cultural significance ===
Many festivals like Shivaratri, Jalasayi, Kartika Purnima are observed.

=== Social significance ===
Pinda, Sradha, Mundanakriya etc. are also held.

=== Associational significance ===
The tank is associated with Sri Sri Dadhivamana Sundaresvara Trust Board.

== Physical description ==
=== Surrounding ===
The tank has laterite embankments on all the four sides. The temple of Sundaresvara Mahadeva stands on the northern embankment within a distance of 7.00 m across the road. On the north-west corner there is a recently built house that partly encroaches the ancient tank.

=== Orientation ===
Bathing ghats provided with steps in the northern and western embankments.

=== Architectural features ===
Rectangular on plan measuring 49.00 m in length, 44.30 m in breadth and 3.50 m in depth. At the centre of the tank there is a small shrine. There are thirteen flights of steps in the north-western corner leading down to the tank. The building material used for construction is dressed laterite blocks. The construction techniques used is dry masonry.

- It is fed by a natural spring from the underground.
- The excess and waste water is discharged through an outlet channel in the east. As a result the water level of the tank remains constant throughout the year. The water is fresh and clean. The water is used for ritual bath as well as community bath of the locality.

== State of preservation ==
Currently the condition of the condition is pretty good but the southern wall of the tank is partly broken and now the renovation work is going on. It was repaired by Endowment Department in the past and presently maintained by Sri Sri Dadhivamana Sundaresvara Mahadeva Trust Board.

== Grade ==
Classification	Grade
Architecture	B
Historic	C
Associational	A
Social/Cultural	B
