= Kukutesvara Tank =

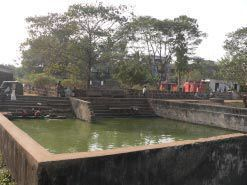

- Location in Odisha Kukutesvara Tank (India)

Religion
- Affiliation: Hinduism
- Deity: Shiva Shiva

Location
- Location: Bhubaneswar
- State: Odisha
- Country: India
- Interactive map of Kukutesvara Tank
- Coordinates: 21°15′0″N 85°50′20″E

Architecture
- Type: Kalingan Style (Kalinga Architecture)
- Completed: 12-13th century A.D.
- Elevation: 22 m (72 ft)

Kukutesvara Tank is associated with the Kukutesvara Siva temple of Bhubaneswar.

== Name ==
i) Present Name: Kukutesvara Tank

== Location ==
Lat. 210 15’ 00" N., Long. 850 49’ 80" E., Elev. 85 ft

i) Address and approach: Kukutesvara Tank is situated at a distance of 15.00 metres south-west of the Kukutesvara temple.

ii) Tradition and legends: —

== Ownership ==
i) Single/ Multiple: Multiple

ii) Public/ Private: Public

iii) Any other (specify): It is looked after by Brahmana Niyoga Samiti.

iv) Name: —

v) Address: Tinimundia Chowk, Old Town, Bhubaneswar.

== Age ==
i) Precise date: —

ii) Approximate date: —

iii) Source of information: —

== Property type ==
i) Precinct/ Building/ Structure/Landscape/Site/Tank: Tank

ii) Subtype: Spring

iii) Typology: Tank with embankments.

== Property use ==
i) Abandoned/ in use: In use

ii) Present use: Living tank

iii) Past use: Used

== Significance ==
i) Cultural significance: Kartika purnima and other ritual bath.

ii) Social significance: Mundana kriya and public bath.

== Physical description ==
i) Surrounding: This tank is surrounded by Railway track in south- eastern corner at a distance of 10.00 metres, Kukutesvara Siva temple in north-east at a distance of 5.00 metres and residential buildings in the north and south.

ii) Orientation: The tank is provided with steps in the southern embankment.

iii) Architectural features (Plan and Elevation): On plan, the tank is rectangular in shape measuring 18.50 metres in length x 17 metres in width with a depth of 2.40 metres.

iv) Building material: Laterite.

v) Construction techniques: Dry masonry 267

== State of preservation ==
i) Good/Fair/ Showing signs of deterioration/Advanced: Fair

ii) State of decay/Danger of disappearance:

== Condition description ==
i) Repairs and maintenance: It is repaired and maintained by Brahmana Niyoga Samiti.

== Grade (A/B/C) ==
i) Architecture: A

ii) Historic: C

iii) Associational: B

iv) Social/Cultural: B

v) Others: —

== Threats to the property ==
Conservation Problem and Remedies: This is a natural spring in which water level remains constant throughout the year as the excess water is discharged through an outlet channel provided in the eastern embankment. Growth of vegetation on the inner walls of the embankment.
