= Laddu Baba Temple =

Shiva temple in Odisha, India

Coordinates: 20.032038°N 85.085007°E

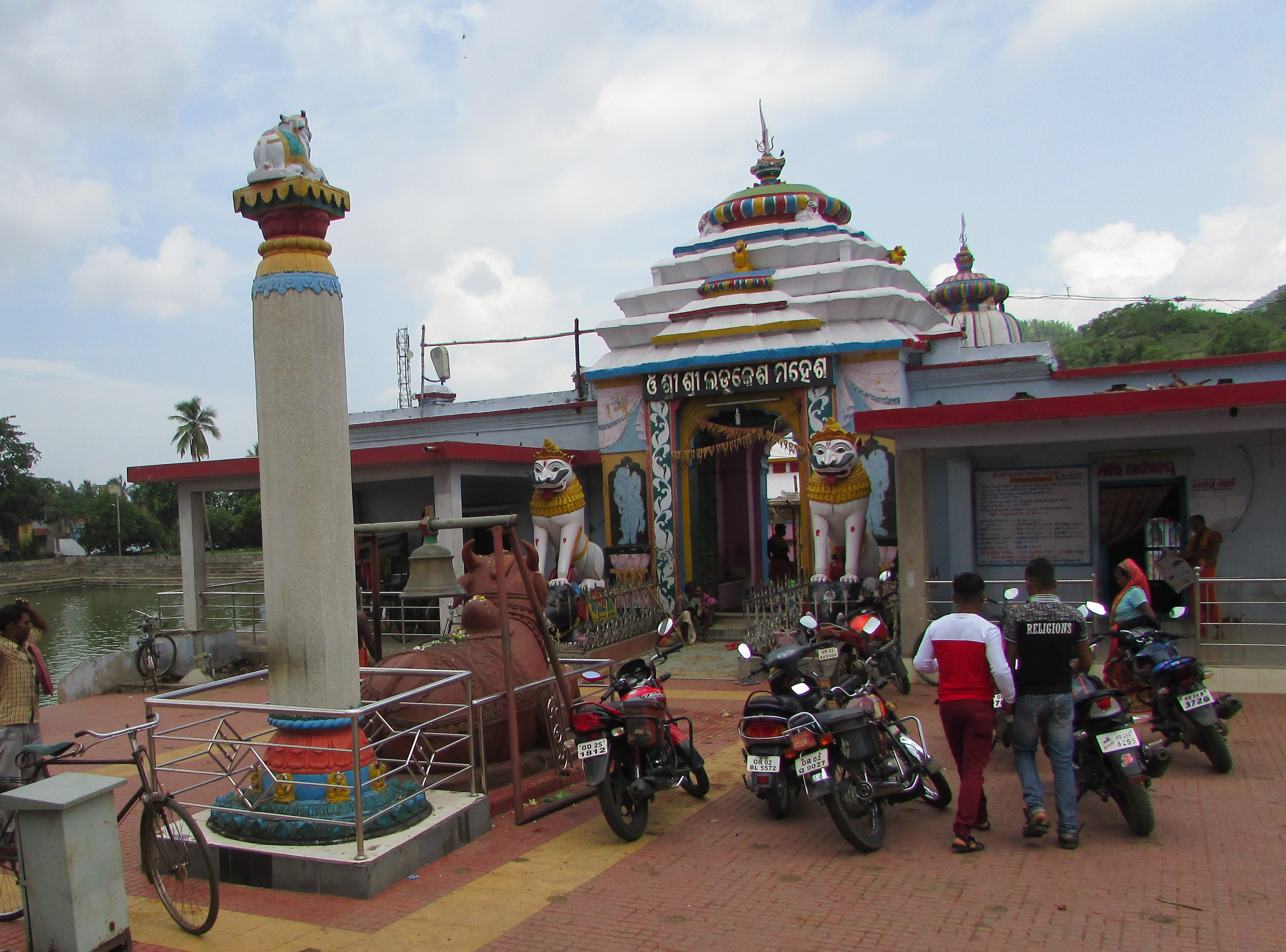
Ladubaba temple

Laddu Baba Temple is a Hindu temple dedicated to Shiva worshipped as Laddukeshwar but affectionately called Laddu Baba in the town of Sharanakula in Nayagarh district of Odisha, India. The temple dating back to medieval times shows a fusion of Kalinga and Dravidian temple architecture. Unlike most other Hindu temples, the prayers have traditionally been conducted by priests belonging to low caste. The temple is an important pilgrimage for Shaivites in southern Odisha. Mahashivaratri is the major festival.
