= Bhagabati Temple, Banapur =

Temple in India

Coordinates: 19.759357°N 85.161953°E

Bhagabati Temple

Religion
- Affiliation: Hinduism
- District: Banapur
- Deity: Goddess Bhagabati

Location
- Location: Banapur
- State: Odisha
- Country: India
- Interactive map of Bhagabati Temple

The temple of the goddess Bhagabati, the presiding deity of the Indian town Banapur in Odisha has earned celebrity as a centre of religious activities. Once Banapur was the capital of the Sailodhvaba dynasty, responsible for the construction of the early group of temples at Bhubaneswar. The large number of Buddhist images discovered at Banapur relate the place to the Vajrayana cult of Buddhism.

== Animal sacrifice ==
On 5 October 2010 the Orissa High Court directed the state government to make sure that animal sacrifices are not conducted at the temple during the Dussehra.
