= Murga Mahadeva Shrine =

Coordinates: 22.111078°N 85.469599°E

The Murga Mahadeva Shrine is a shrine to Shiva in the Nuamundi mines area of the Champua subdivision of Kendujhar district. Devotees visit during the months of Shraavana and Kartik, and during Shivaratri. It is an ancient shrine where both the tribal and Brahminical systems of worship are followed.

== Etymology ==
The name comes from the words Murugan and Mahadev, which mean Kartikeya and Shiva respectively in Dravidian languages.
