= Manibhadresvara Temple – II =

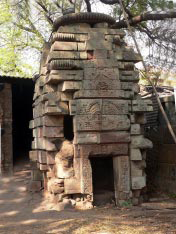

- Location in Orissa

Religion
- Affiliation: Hinduism
- Deity: lord Siva

Location
- Location: Bhubaneswar
- State: Orissa
- Country: India
- Coordinates: 20°14′27″N 85°50′12″E

Architecture
- Type: Kalingan Style (Kalinga Architecture)
- Completed: 12-13th century A.D.
- Elevation: 23 m (75 ft)

Manibhadresvara Temple – II is an abandoned Hindu temple located in Bhubaneswar, Orissa, India. Its elevation is 74 feet (23 m).

== Location ==
It is situated on the left side of the Rath Road branching from Mausima (Ramesvara) temple to Badheibanka Chowk. The temple now stands on private land.

== History ==
It is privately owned by Rabindra Kumar Paramaguru. Its architectural features indicate that it was formed in the 8th century.

== Architecture ==
Its typology is Rekha deul in the Kalingan style. The temple is surrounded by Paramaguru temple, shops, a well and residential buildings. The temple faces east. On plan, the temple has a square vimana that measures 2.20 square meters. On elevation, the temple is a triratha that measures 4.20 m in height. Pabhaga is buried, jangha 1.00 m, gandi 3.00 m, mastaka 0.20 m. The amalaka stone is broken.

Decorative features include door jams that measure 1.20 m in height x 0.90 m in width, a plain lintel. It is built with grey sandstone using dry masonry.

== Conservation ==
Cracks have developed in all sides of the temple. Pabhaga is buried and the kanika paga has collapsed. The temple is crumbling.
