= Indralath Temple =

Coordinates: 20.287079°N 82.968255°E

Indralatha Temple (8th Century AD ).

Indralatha Temple is dedicated to Shiva and is situated in Bangomunda block near Ranipur-Jharial in Balangir district. It was supposed that Indra first worshipped lord Shiva here and erected a temple.

== Architecture ==
This is an intact brick temple whose Jagamohana and other structures are destroyed. Only the vimana which is of Rekha deula order is existing. The innermost sanctum houses a recent installed Linga, along with old images of Vishnu, Kartikeya and Uma-Maheshwara. The old Shivalinga is displaced to outside by some attack, which proves the existing Shivalinga placed outside the temple (made of sandstone and terracotta).

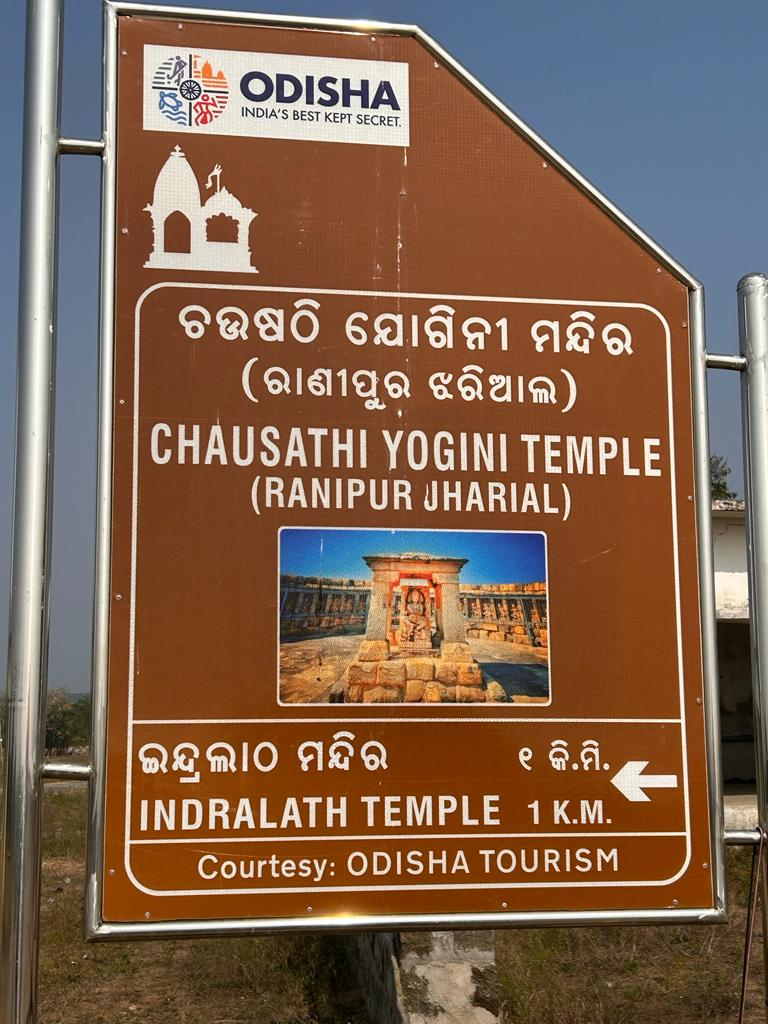

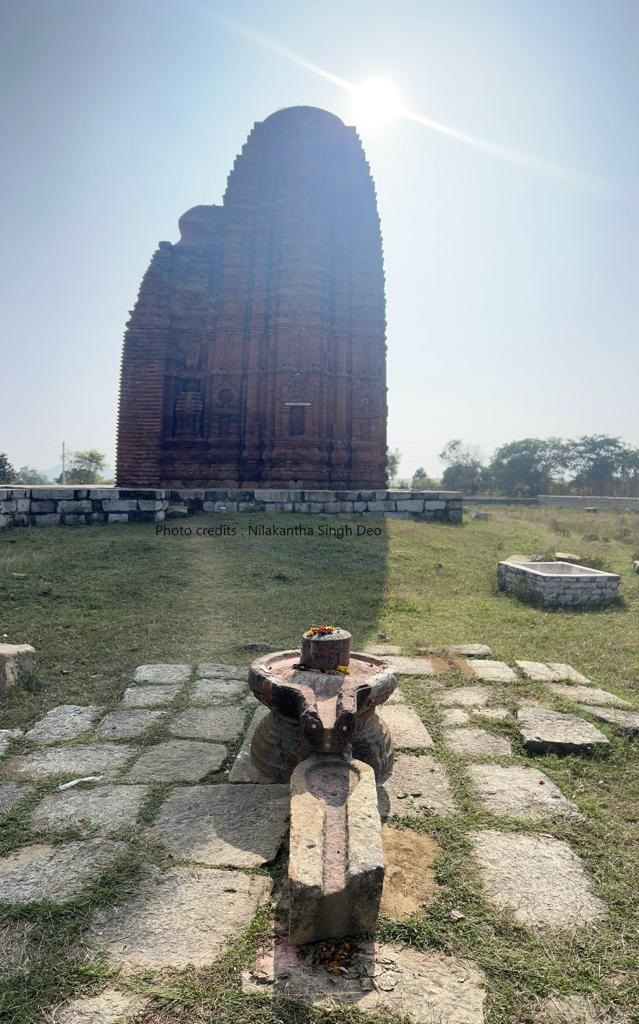

== Temple at present ==
The temple is maintained by Archaeological Survey of India. Being a brick temple, the time built can be traced to the 10th-11th century CE during the rule of the Somavamshi dynasty. Images of Nrisimha, Vishnu along with Ganesh, Kartikeya clearly proves that it was a centre for Harihara worship. Every year Shivaratri and other festivals related to Shiva and Vishnu are organised. Daily worship is done by some local priest. Kantabanji is easily accessed by railway from Raipur and Balangir.

The only surviving brick temple of the region has possessed the cult affinity to both Saivite & Vaisnavite which is exhibited in the decoration of the outer wall. The scheme of architecture is assigned to early 10th century AD.

Indralatha Temple(ଇନ୍ଦ୍ରଲାଠ ମନ୍ଦିର) is the tallest brick temple found in Orissa (refer : External links section below) .
