= Sekhareswar Temple =

Coordinates: 20.271430°N 86.435778°E

The Sekhareswar Temple is a Hindu temple situated in Lathanga village in Jagatsinghpur district of Orissa, India. Sekhareswar in Sanskrit refers to the Godhead. The temple is dedicated to Shiva. The Varuni Yatra of Sekhareswar is one thousand years old. The Sekhareswar Sanskrit Tol, the Sekhareswar Sanskrit College and the Sekhareswar Yuva Parishad are named after the Lord of this temple.

The temple is maintained by a board of trustees headed by Dr. L.N. Acharya, Sri B.D. Acharya, Pdt. S.N. Acharya, Sri Vasudev Acharya and Sri Dhrutisundar Acharya.
