= Bhima Kunda =

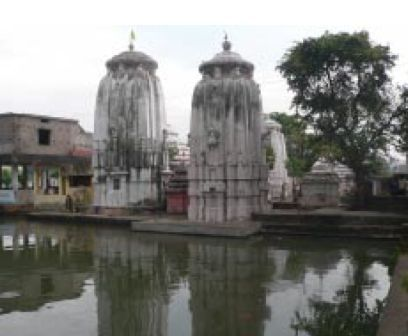

- Location in Odisha Bhima Kunda (India)

Religion
- Affiliation: Hinduism

Location
- Location: Bhubaneswar
- State: Odisha
- Country: India
- Interactive map of Bhima Kunda
- Coordinates: 20°14′22″N 85°49′27″E

Architecture
- Elevation: 38 m (125 ft)

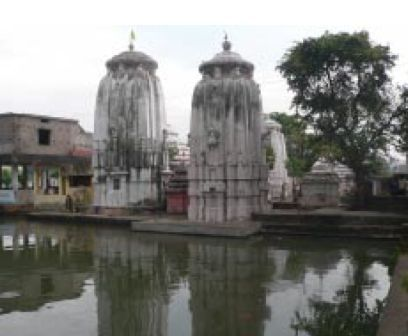
Bhima kunda in Bhubaneswar

Bhima Kunda (tank) is located beyond the western compound wall of the Bhimesvara Temple precinct, in Kapila Prasad, Old Town, Bhubaneswar. It is now under the care and maintenance of Bhimesvara Temple Development Committee. The tank was excavated by cutting through the laterite bed rock. The embankment is made of dressed laterite blocks.

== Ownership ==
Single/ Multiple: Multiple

Public/ Private: Private It is under the care and maintenance of Bhimesvara Temple Development Committee.

Address: Kapila Prasad, Bhimatangi, Bhubaneswar

== Property Type ==
Precinct/ Building/ Structure/Landscape/Site/Tank: Tank

Typology: Embankments

== Property use ==
Abandoned/ in use: In use.

Present use: Temple rituals as well as normal bathing.

Past use: Could not be ascertained.

== Significance ==
Cultural significance: Kartika Purnima, Pinda is also offered.

Social significance: Mundanakriya

Associational significance: Bhimesvara Temple Development Committee.

== Physical description ==
Surrounding: The tank has embankments on all the four sides. The Bhimesvara temple precinct stands on its eastern embankment, Bhubaneswar-Jatani road, on its west, private residential buildings in north and open space in south.

Orientation: Bathing ghat provided with steps in the southern embankment.

=== Architectural features (Plan & Elevation) ===
The tank is square on plan measuring 38.10 square metres with a depth of 5.50 metres. It has an entrance in the south and there are flights of steps leading down to the tank. The section cutting through the laterite bed served as walls of the tank on all its four sides.

=== Decorative features ===
Building material: laterite

Construction techniques: Dry masonry.

Special features, if any: It is a seasonal tank as the water dries up during the summer season.

== State of preservation ==
Good/Fair/ Showing Signs of Deterioration/Advanced: Bad state of preservation because of the growth of wild vegetations on its outer wall.

== Condition description ==
Repairs and Maintenance: It is repaired and maintained by the Bhimesvara Temple Development Committee.

== Grade (A/B/C) ==
Architecture: B

Historic: C

Associational: B

Social/Cultural: B

== Reference and notes ==
1. K.C. Panigrahi, Archaeological Remains at Bhubaneswar, Calcutta, 1961. P. 174.

2. L. S.S. O’ Malley, Bengal District Gazetter Puri, Calcutta 1908, P. 241.

3. M.M. Ganguly, Orissa and Her Remains, Calcutta, 1912, P. 274.

4. R.L. Mitra. The Antiquities of Orissa, Calcutta, 1963, P. 162.
