= Sundaresvara Siva Temple =

Sundaresvara Siva temple
- Location in Orissa

Religion
- Affiliation: Hinduism
- Deity: lord lingaraja

Location
- Location: Bhubaneswar
- State: Orissa
- Country: India
- Interactive map of Sundaresvara Siva temple
- Coordinates: 20°14′27″N 85°50′12″E

Architecture
- Type: Kalingan Style (Kalinga Architecture)
- Elevation: 22 m (72 ft)

Sinduresvara Siva temple is located in village Sundarpada, Old Town, Bhubaneswar, Odisha, India. It is on the right side of the road leading from Lingaraj temple to Sundarpada. The enshrined deity is a circular yonipitha facing towards the north. The Siva lingam decayed in course of time. In April 2013 the villagers raised funds and reestablished new Shiv Linga. There are two entrances on the south-west and northwest corners provided with seven flights of steps leading down to the temple.

== Location ==
Siva temples is located in village Sundarpada, Old Town, Bhubaneswar. It is on the right side of the road leading from Lingaraja temple to Sundarpada. The enshrined deity, a circular yonipitha, faces towards the south with a drain to release sacred water of Lord Sunduresvara to a pond named 'Sunduresvar' on the south of the temple. The drain is beneath the road. The Siva lingam replaced in April 2013 by villagers. The temple precinct is 1.15 metres below the present road level.

There are two entrances on the south-west and northwest corners provided with seven flights of steps leading down to the temple. The temple face is towards west and the 'snan mandap' of Lord Patitapaban. Lord Patitapaban temple is on south-west direction of the entrance of Sunduresvara temple. Each year on Deva Snana Purnami i.e. Jyestha Purnami Lord Patitapabana is physically pulled to this mandap for 'snan' - i.e. annual bath ceremony. Pandit Anam Nanda who was a great devotee used to take care of the puja archana. He died on Snan Purnima day. His two younger brothers Pandit Achyutananda Nanda and Pandit Lingaraj Nanda are also great devotees of Sunduresvar, Lord Patitapaban.

Facing the idol 'nrusimha avatar' on the hind wall of 'lord Patitapaban' is Gokhibaba temple which is the samadhi pitha of Gokhi Das. Makar Sankranti ( mostly fall on 14 January each year) is the day of great function of Gokhi baba. People from far and near come here to celebrate the week-long function. Presently Kuma Kaka, Shri Prafulla Kumar Nayak, Shri Krushna Parida and Shri Bipin Bihari Mohapatra take lead to manage the function.

== Ownership ==
The temple is under the Endowment Department and looked after by Sri Sri Dadhivamana Sundaresvara Mahadeva Trust Board having eleven members.

== Age ==
Based on architectural features and building materials it dates from approximately the 13th Century CE.

== Property type ==
The temple is constructed in the Rekha deul typology.

== Significance ==
1. Historic significance: Local people ascribe the temple to the Kesaris (Somavamsis) in general and Yajati-I the builder of the Lingaraja temple in particular.
2. Cultural significance: Rituals like Sivaratri, Sankranti Kartika Purnima, Dola Purnima and Jalabhiseka are observed.
3. Social significance: Marriage and thread ceremony, etc. are observed.
4. Associational significance: Sri Dadhivamana Sundaresvara Mahadeva Trustee Board.

== Physical description ==
The temple is surrounded by the temple compound walls in east, west, south and the kitchen in north. And beyond the compound wall it is surrounded by the road in east, adhivamana and Gokhi Baba temples in west, residential buildings in north and Sundaresvara tank in the south across the road.

It is oriented facing towards West.

The temple stands on a low and rectangular platform measuring 8.45 metres in length x 4.85 metres in width, with a height of 0.15 metres. On plan, the temple has a vimana, ganthiala and a jagamohana. The vimana measures 3.10 square metres and jagamohana measures 5.15 metres in length and 4.65 metres in breadth. The ganthiala measures 0.50 metres in length. On elevation, the temple has a rekha vimana and pidha jagamohana measuring 5.26 metres and 4.33 metres in height respectively from pabhaga to kalasa. With the threefold divisions of bada the Vimana has a trianga bada measuring 1.81 metres in height (pabhaga 0.49 metres, jangha 1.00 metres, and baranda 0.32 metres). The gandi measures 2.25 metres and mastaka 1.20 metres in height respectively. With threefold division of bada, the jagamohana measures 1.53 metres in height (pabhaga-0.29 metres, jangha-0.69 metres, and baranda-0.55 metres). The gandi of jagamohana with five receding tiers measures 1.30 metres. The mastaka measures 1.50 metres has components like beki, amalaka, khapuri and kalasa.

== Raha niche and parsva devatas ==
Raha niches located in the jangha of north and south and east measures 0.45 metres in height x 030 metres in width and with a depth of 0.12 metres. The eastern raha niche houses a four armed Kartikeya standing over a lotus pedestal. The deity holds a cock in lower left hand whose legs are resting over the right uplifted hand of a female attendant. The lower right hand is touching the beak of his mount peacock. The deity holds a cattle drum (dambaru) in his upper left and a trident in upper right hand.

His head is crowned with jatamukuta. The northern raha niche houses a four armed Parvati holding ankusa in her upper left, nagapasa in upper right, mace in lower left and a rosary in lower right hand. The southern raha niche houses a four armed Ganesa holding a modakapatra in lower left, nagapasa in upper left, broken tooth in lower right and a rosary in upper right hand. The deity is seated over a lotus pedestal.

== Decorative features ==
The doorjambs are decorated with three plain vertical bands and measures 1.40 metres in height and 0.87 metres in width. In the lalatabimba Gajalaxmi is seated over a lotus pedestal and holding lotus in her both hands. Lintel: In the architrave above the doorjambs, nine grahas are carved into the navagraha panel.

It is built of sandstone in vimana and laterite in jagamohana, using dry masonry, cement plaster and whitewash. The style is Kalingan.

Jaga mohan is a later addition.

== Condition ==
It is graded A for associational and B for architecture, historic and social/cultural. It is in a good state of preservation. Recently temple was plastered and white washed. It was repaired by the Endowment Department and presently is maintained by Sri Sri Dadhivamana Sundaresvara Trustee Board.

== Threats to the property ==
The temple is enclosed within a compound wall made of dressed laterite blocks that measures 11.50 metres in length x 13.17 in width and with a height of 2.52 metres. There are two entrances in the south-west and north-west corner of the temple.

Ten detached sculptures are there inside the Jagamohana in the northern and southern walls. These sculptures include Kartikeya, Ganesa, Parvati, miniature circular yoni pithas with Siva lingam.

There is an ancient well made of laterite in the northern side of the jagamohana at a distance of 1.52 metres. It measures 0.84 square metres with a depth of 7.00 metres.
