= Yameshwar Temple =

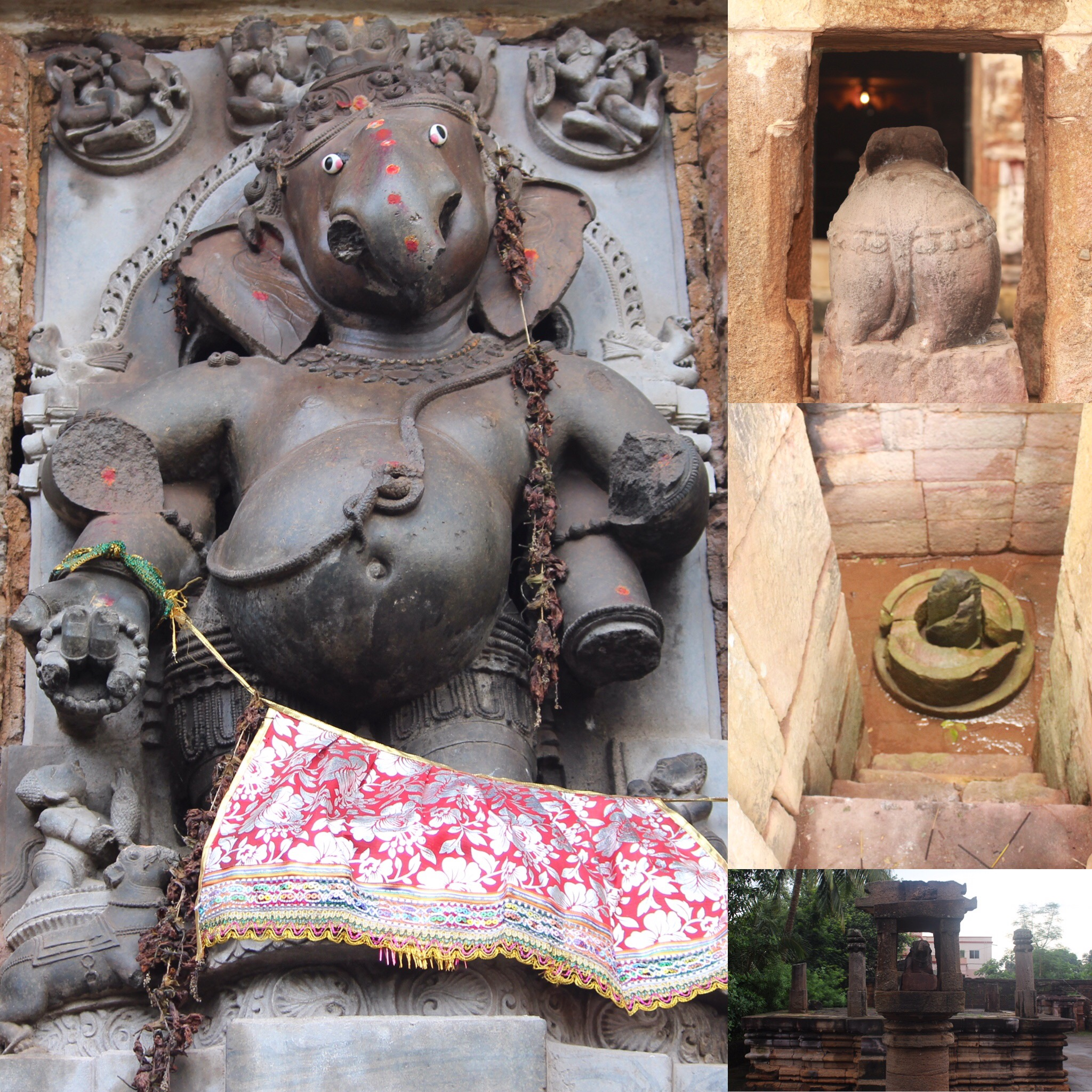

Religion
- Affiliation: Hinduism
- Deity: Shiva
- Festival: Jiuntia or Puajiutia festival

Location
- Location: Bhubaneshwar
- State: Odisha
- Country: India
- Interactive map of Yameshwar Temple
- Coordinates: 20°14′25″N 85°49′53″E

Architecture
- Creator: Eastern Ganga dynasty
- Completed: 13th - 14th century

Yameshwar Temple or Jameshwar Temple is an ancient temple dedicated to the Hindu deities Shiva and Yama. It is located in Bhubaneswar, Odisha, India, near Bharati Matha, in Jameshwar Patna.

== Architecture ==
The main vimana was built in the Rekha Deula architectural style. The jagamohana is in the Pidha Deula style and features a detached mandapa. Many portions of the temple have been damaged over time by natural disasters and extreme weather as the temple is built of sandstone. The outer prakaram is built with laterite. The icons placed around the temple feature several types of themes, including Dikpalas, romantic couples, nayikas, Vidalas, erotic scenes, and elephant processions. The inner garbhagriha houses a Shiva linga within a circular yonipitha. The temple was built in the 13th or 14th century, during the rule of the Eastern Ganga dynasty.

== Festivals and beliefs ==
The Jiuntia, Shivaratri, and Kartik Purnima festivals are widely observed at the temple. Mondays and Sankramana days are considered especially significant. Devotees believe that those who visit the temple during the Bharani Nakshatra are freed from all miseries.

== See also ==
- List of temples in Bhubaneswar

== Gallery ==
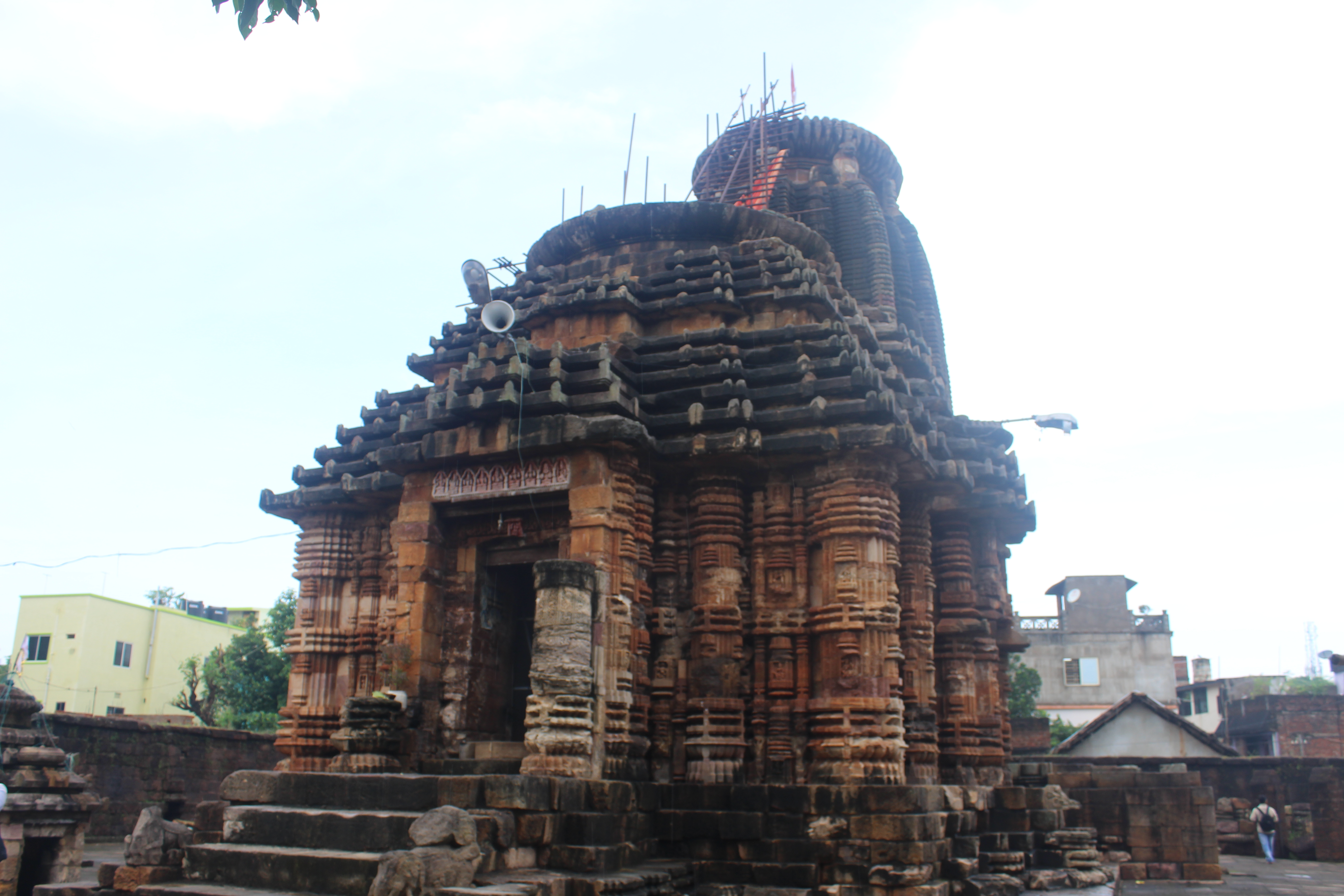
Yameswar Temple

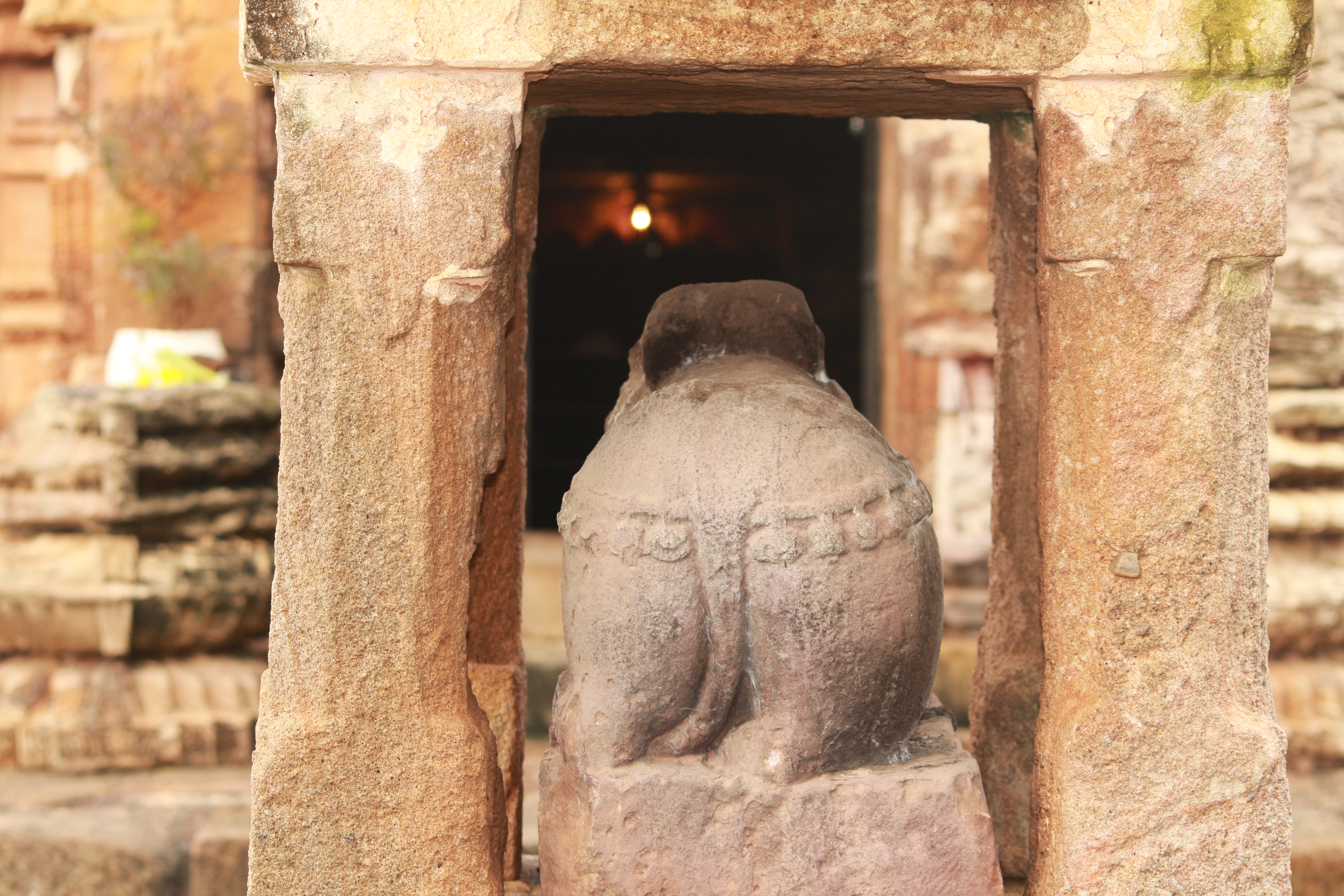
Nandi

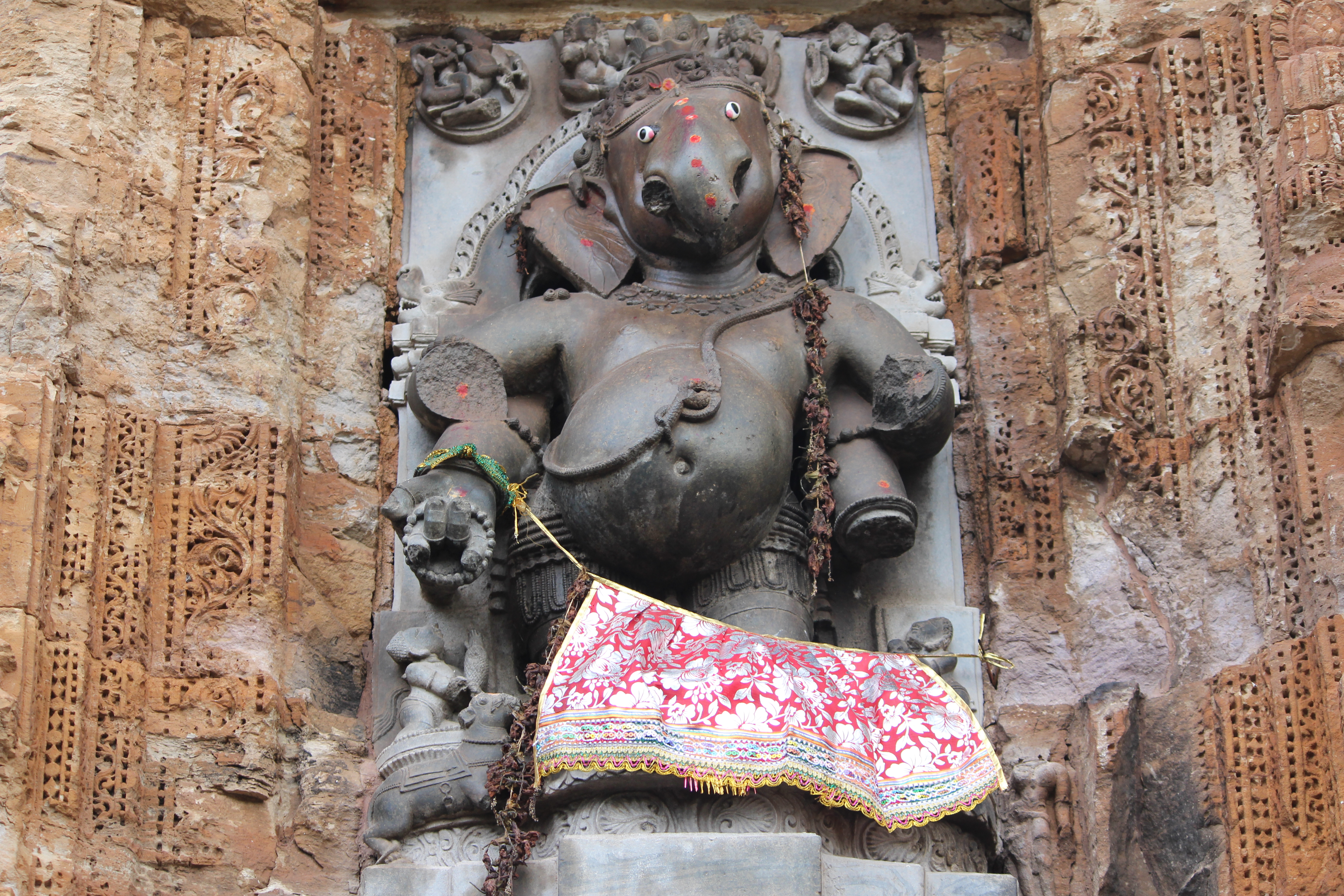
Ganesha idol

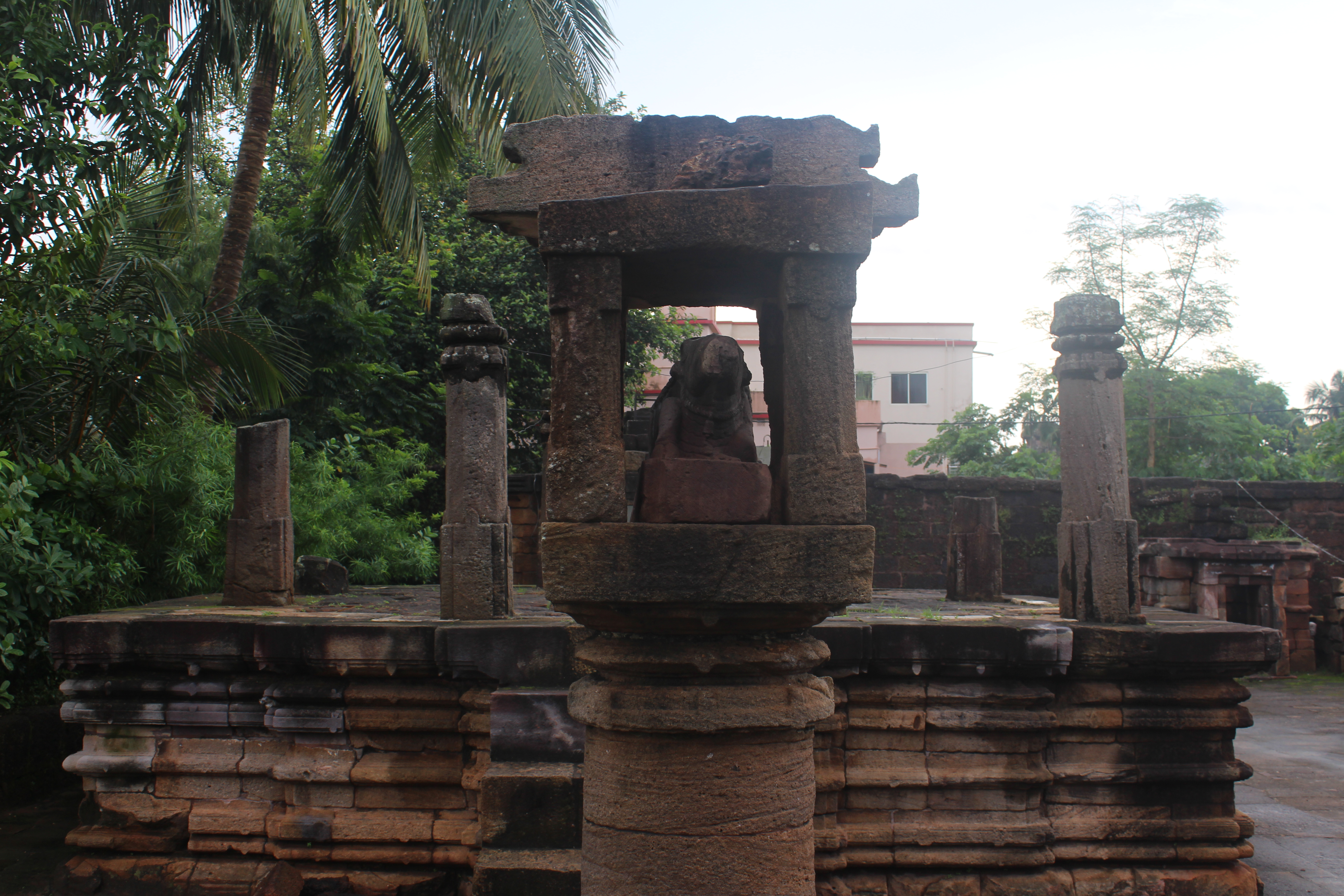
Nrutya Mandap

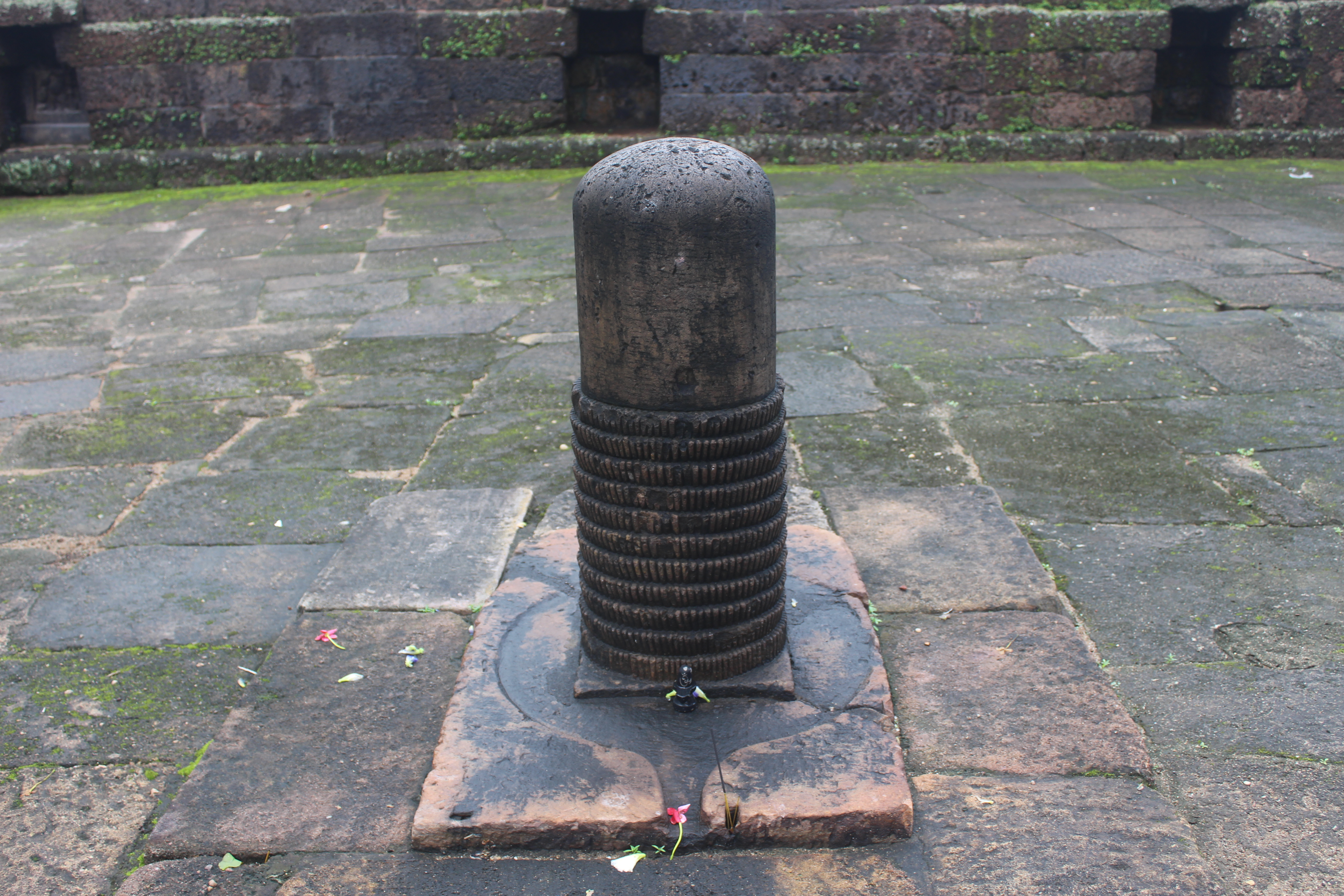
Linga

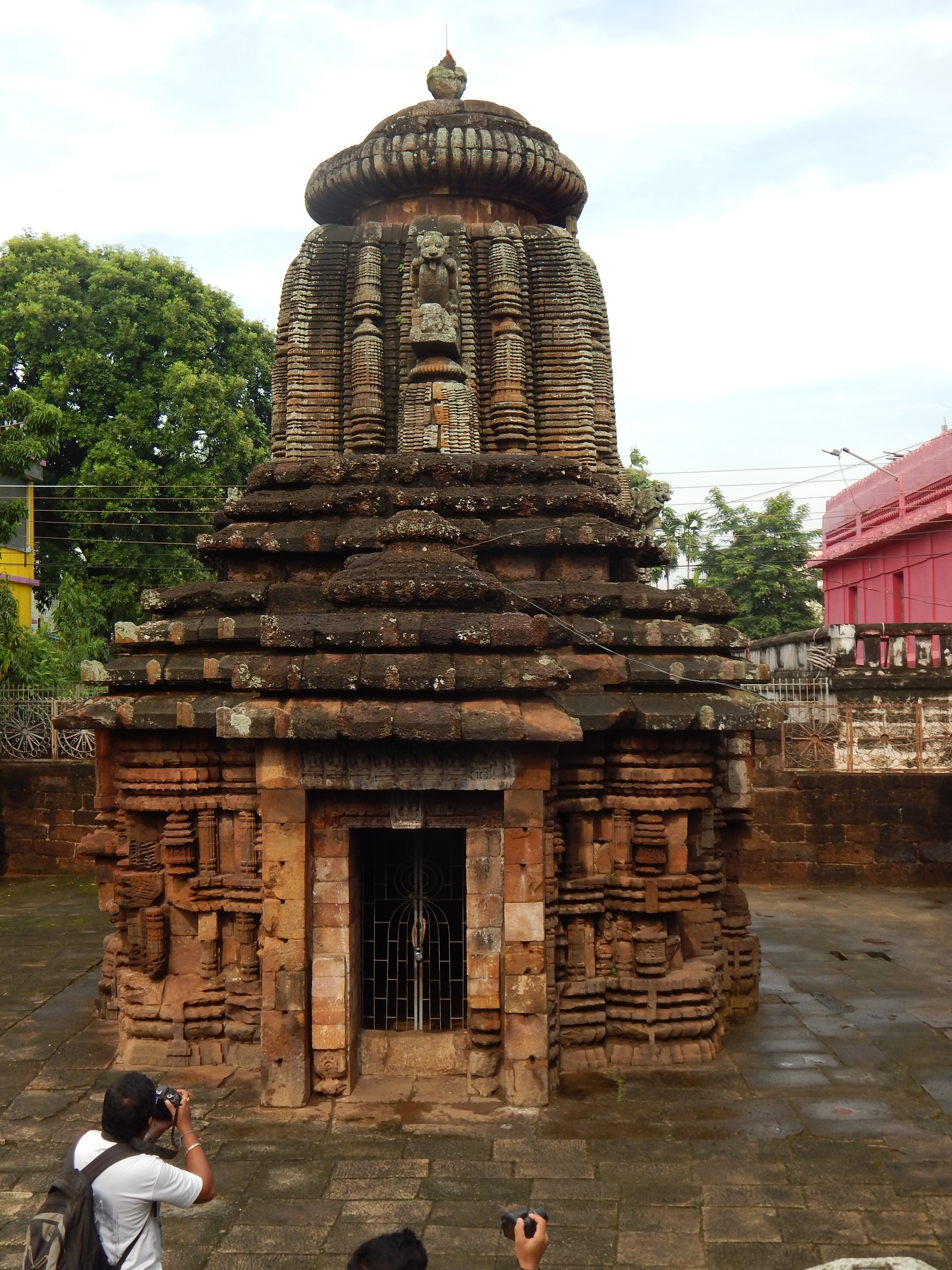
Yameswar Temple

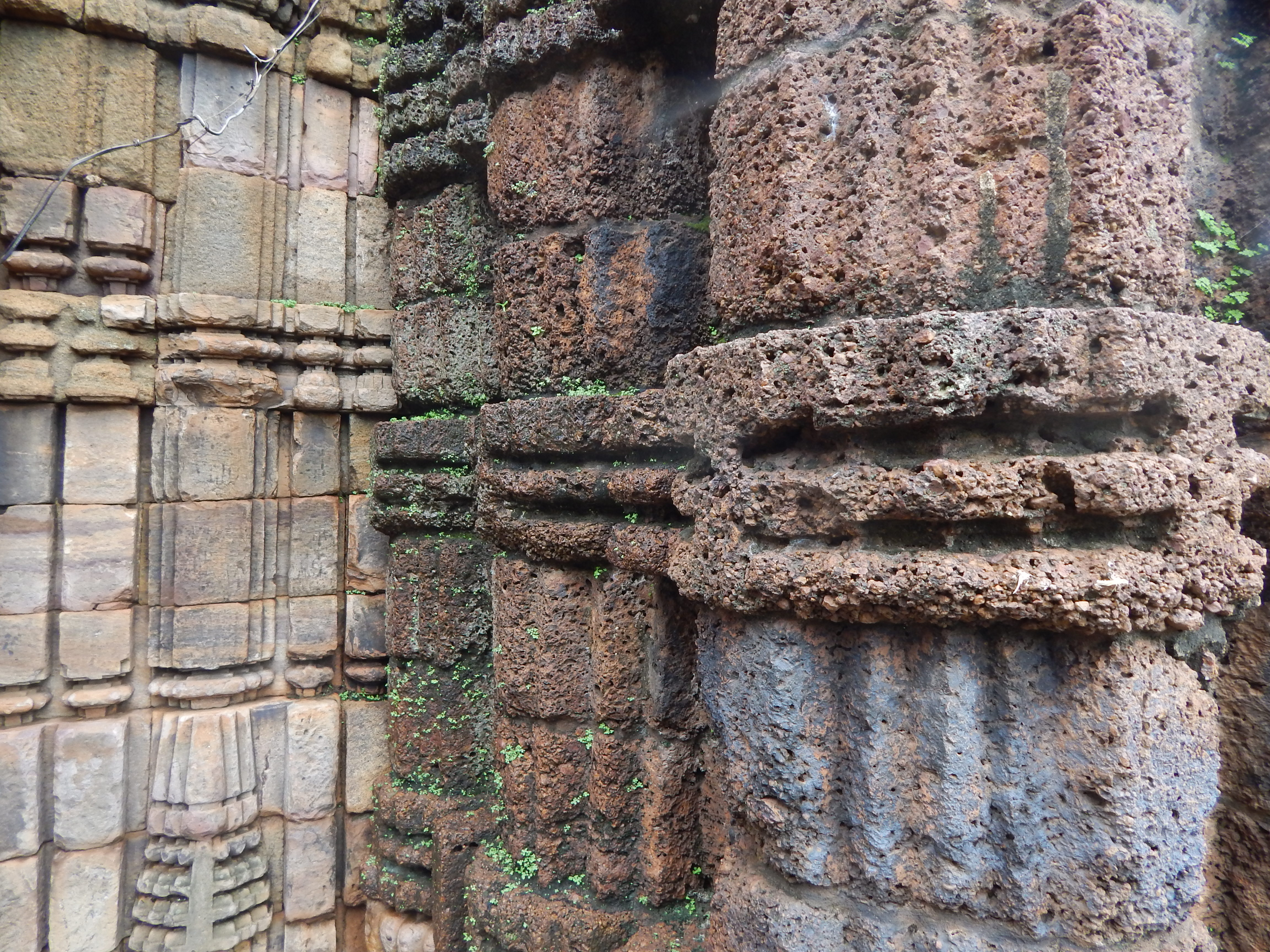
Stone Carving on the sides of Yameswar Temple

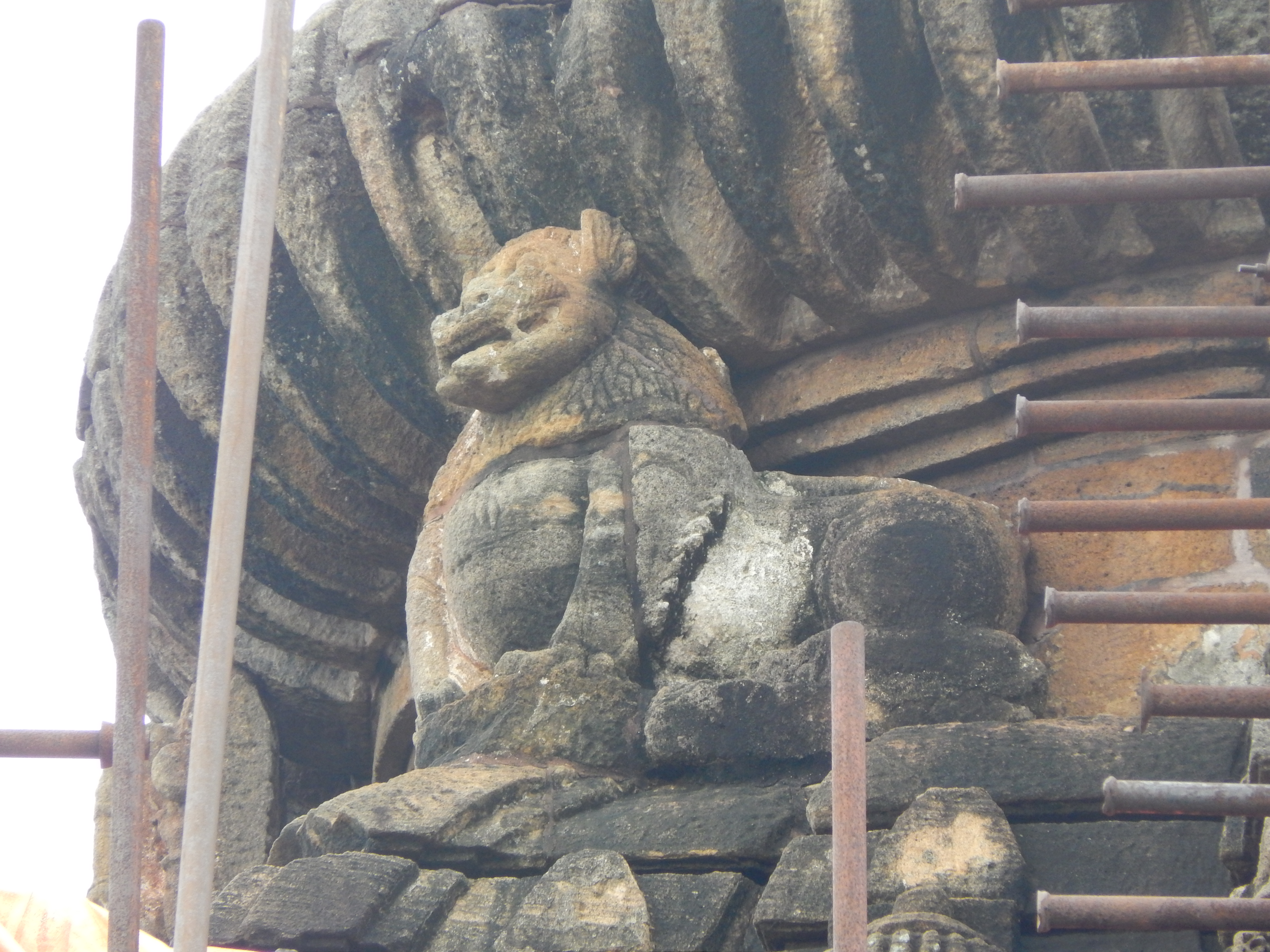
A broken statue of a lion carved on the top of Yameswar Temple

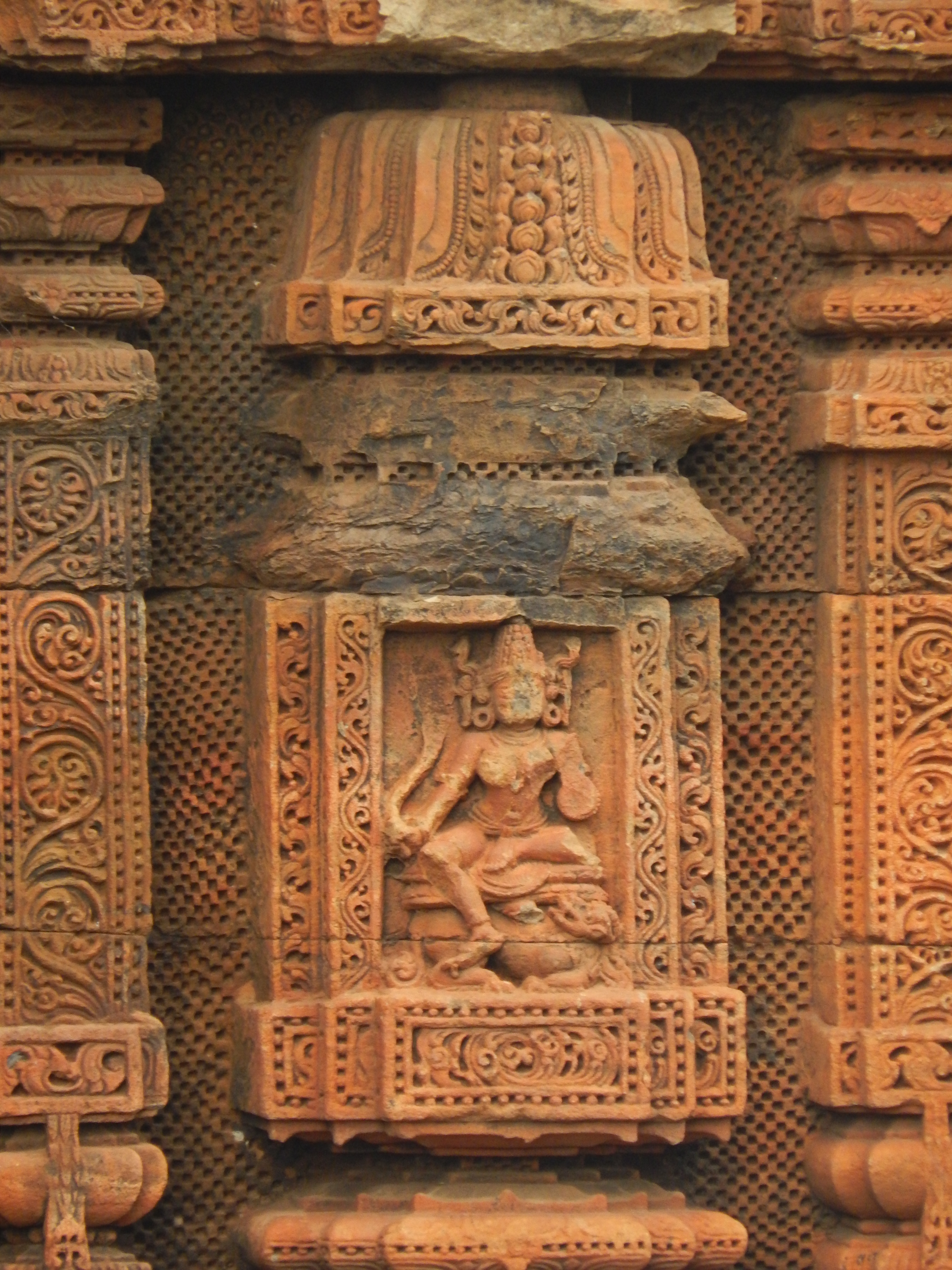
Stone carving done on a side of Yameswar Temple, Bhubaneswar
