= Digambara Jain temple, Khandagiri =

Jain Temple in Odisha

Digambar Jain Temple, Khandagiri
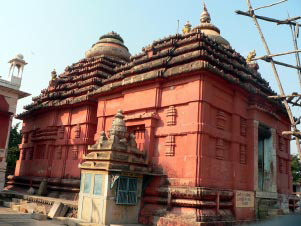
- Digambar Jain Temple, Khandagiri

- Location within Odisha

Religion
- Affiliation: Jainism
- Deity: Parshvanatha
- Festival: Mahavir Jayanti
- Governing body: Bengal, Bihar and Odisha Digambar Jain Tirthkshetra Committee

Location
- Location: Bhubaneswar, Odisha, India
- Coordinates: 20°15′43″N 85°47′10″E

Architecture
- Style: Kalinga architecture
- Established: 12-13th century CE

Specifications
- Temple: 3
- Elevation: 87 m (285 ft)

Digambara Jaina Temple is a Jain temple in Bhubaneswar, in the state of Odisha, India. The temple is on the top of Khandagiri hill. This hill is honeycombed with a series of rock-cut Jaina caves, commissioned by King Kharavela in the 1st century BCE. The rock-cut caves are protected by Archaeological Survey of India. The enshrining deities are a series of Jaina tirthankara images.

== History ==
The architecture of the temple suggest that it was built out of materials from an earlier temple. According to local legends the temple was constructed by Mahameghavahana ruler Kharavela in the 1st century BCE. This legend is not supported by the architectural features. According to Alexander Cunningham, The temple structure is estimated to have been built during the rule of Maratha Empire based on architecture design. The current structure was built in first quarter of the 19th century.

== Architecture ==
This temple is built in Pidha style with Vimana and Jaga mohan following the Kalinga architecture. The temple is built using sandstone in Ashlar fashion with triratha plan and tri-anga bada elevation. The vimana and jagamohana features balustrade windows with vimana follows a square plan and Jaga mohan follows a rectangular plan. The architectural motifs such as khakharamundis and pidhamundis in the lower and upper janghas respectively.

The temple complex consist of three temple, first temple houses a colossal black stone idol of Parshvanatha in a white marble hall. The main shrine houses a white marble idol of Mahavira along with a large number of Jain idols. The third shrines houses 5 images of Jain tirthankara.

== Conservation ==
The temple is maintained by the Bengal, Bihar and Odisha Digambara Jaina Tirthankara Committee. Bimala Devi Jain is the local caretaker.

== See also ==
- Udayagiri and Khandagiri Caves
- Somavamshi dynasty
