= Durga Temple, Baideshwar =

Maa Durga Temple
- ମା ଦୁର୍ଗା ଟେମ୍ପଲ

Religion
- Affiliation: Hinduism
- Region: Baideswar Village
- Deity: Mahishamardini Durga

Location
- State: Odisha
- Country: India
- Interactive map of Maa Durga Temple
- Coordinates: 20.356571°N 85.394353°E

Architecture
- Type: Khakhara vimana

The Durga Temple is a Hindu temple dedicated to Goddess Durga and located in Baideshwar village (near Kalapathara chowk) on the way to Banki of Cuttack District in Odisha, India.

== Architecture ==
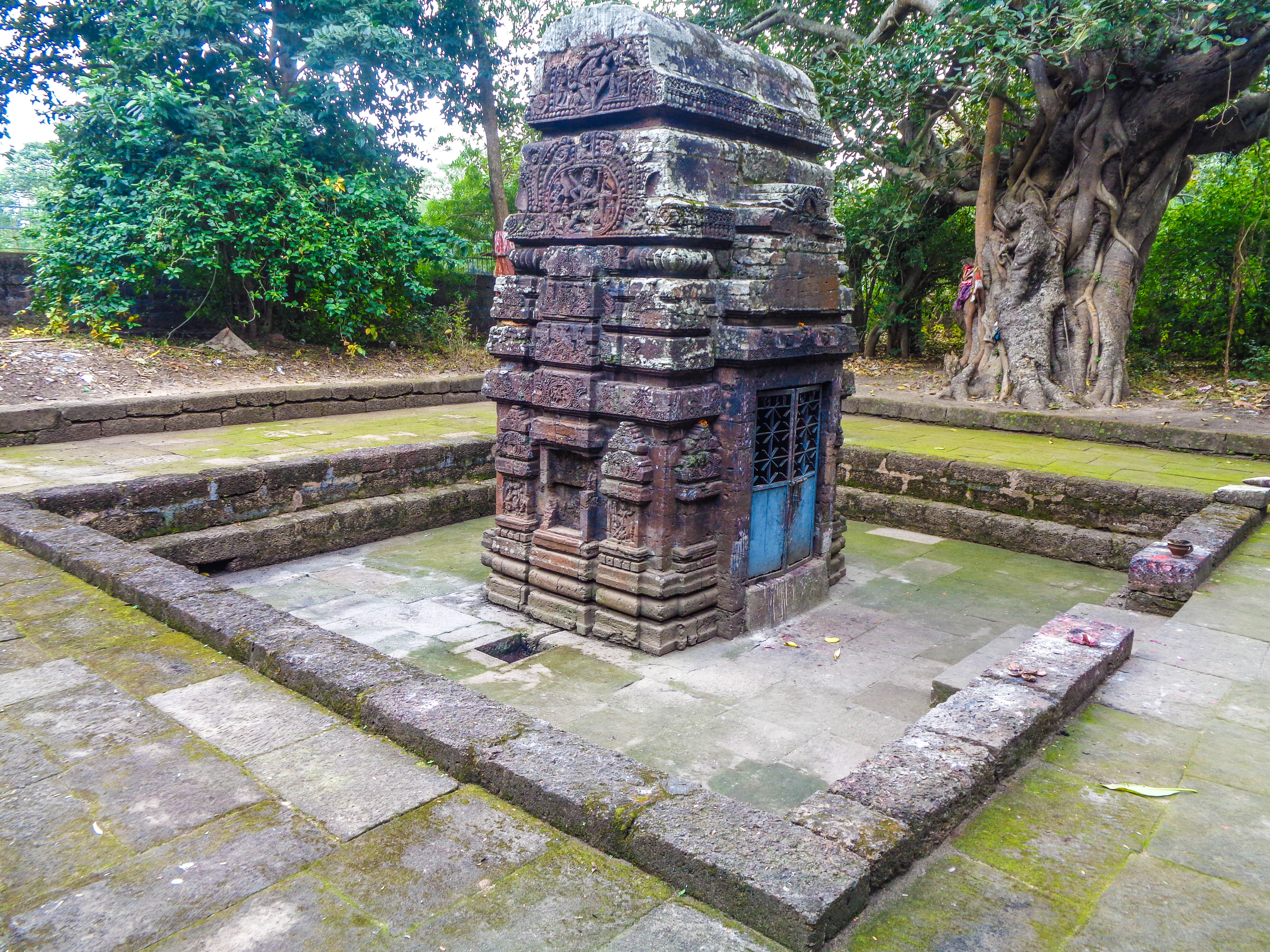
Khakara type Baideswar Durga Temple

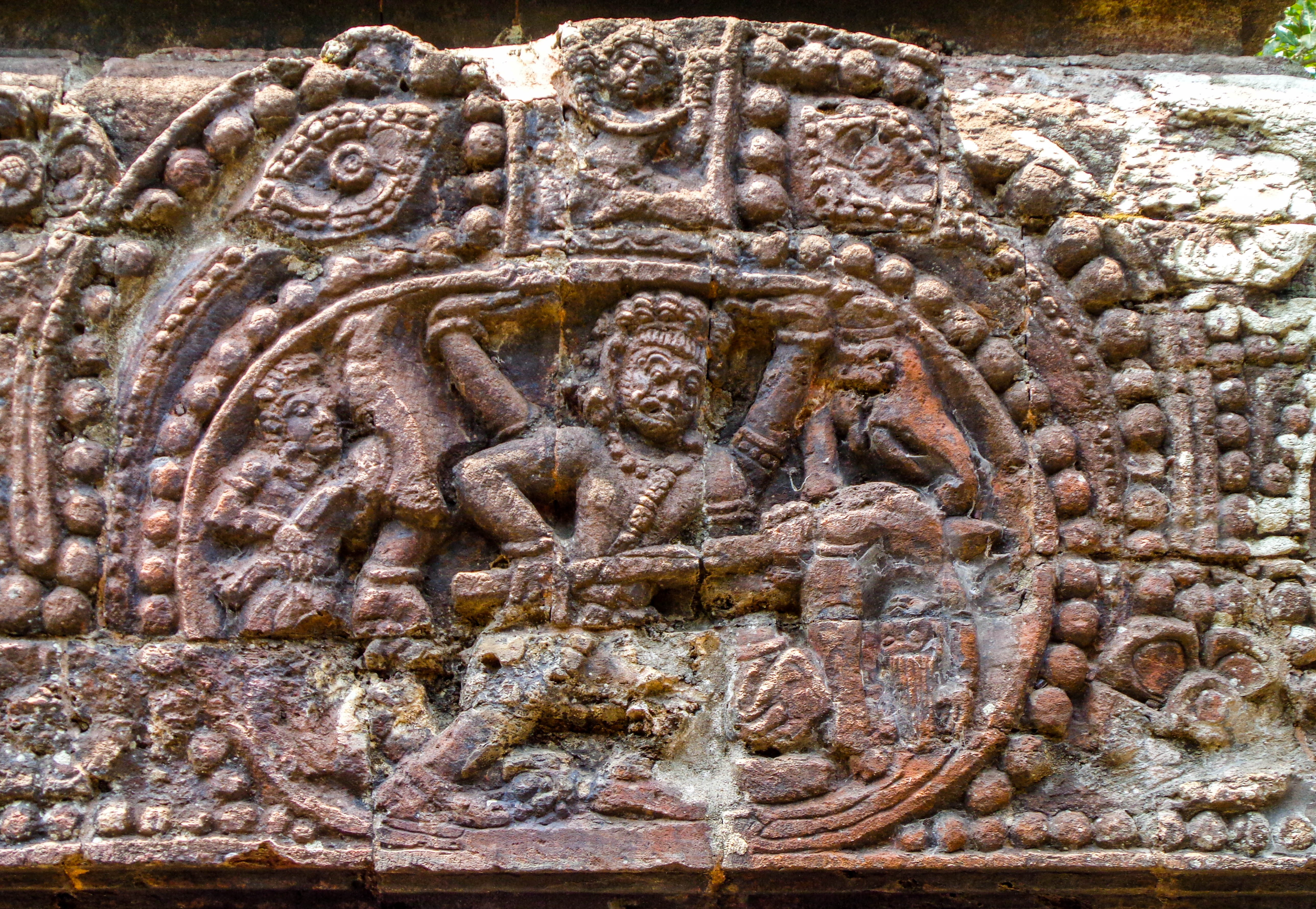
Andhakasura Badhha depiction at Baideswar Durga Temple

The temple has a Khakhara vimana of early Kalingan order during Bhaumakara rule. The survey has assigned the temple to 8th century AD. It is a living temple, enshrining an image of eight-armed Mahishamardini Durga. Mahisasuramardini Durga, Parvati, Aja-ekapada Bhairava and Ganesh images are found. Similar construction are found in Vaital Deula, and Varahi Deula, Chaurasi. The temple is built with Ochre colour sandstone and laterite for the compound wall.

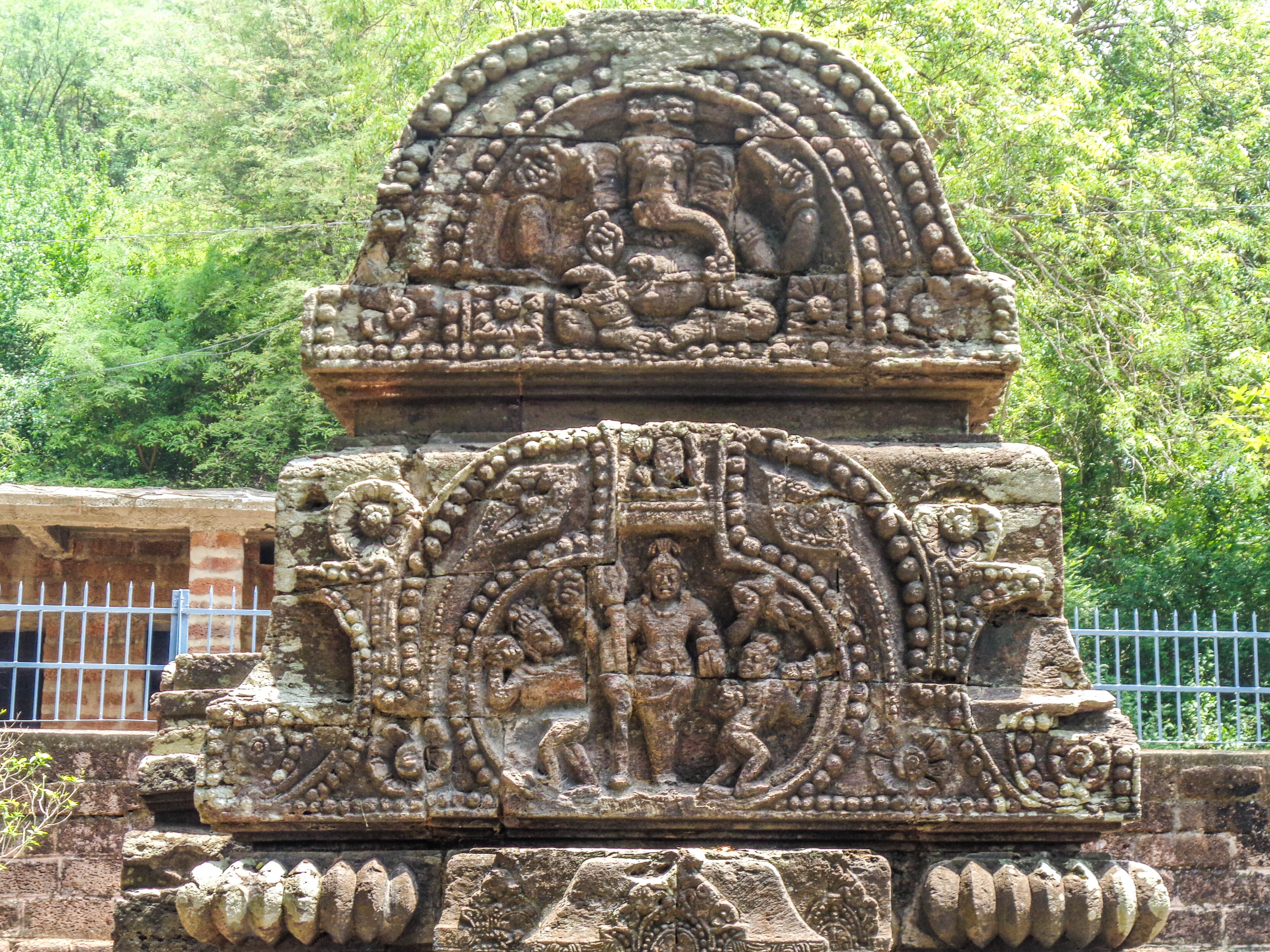
Ganesha and Ekapada Bhairava
