= Khajuresvara temple complex =

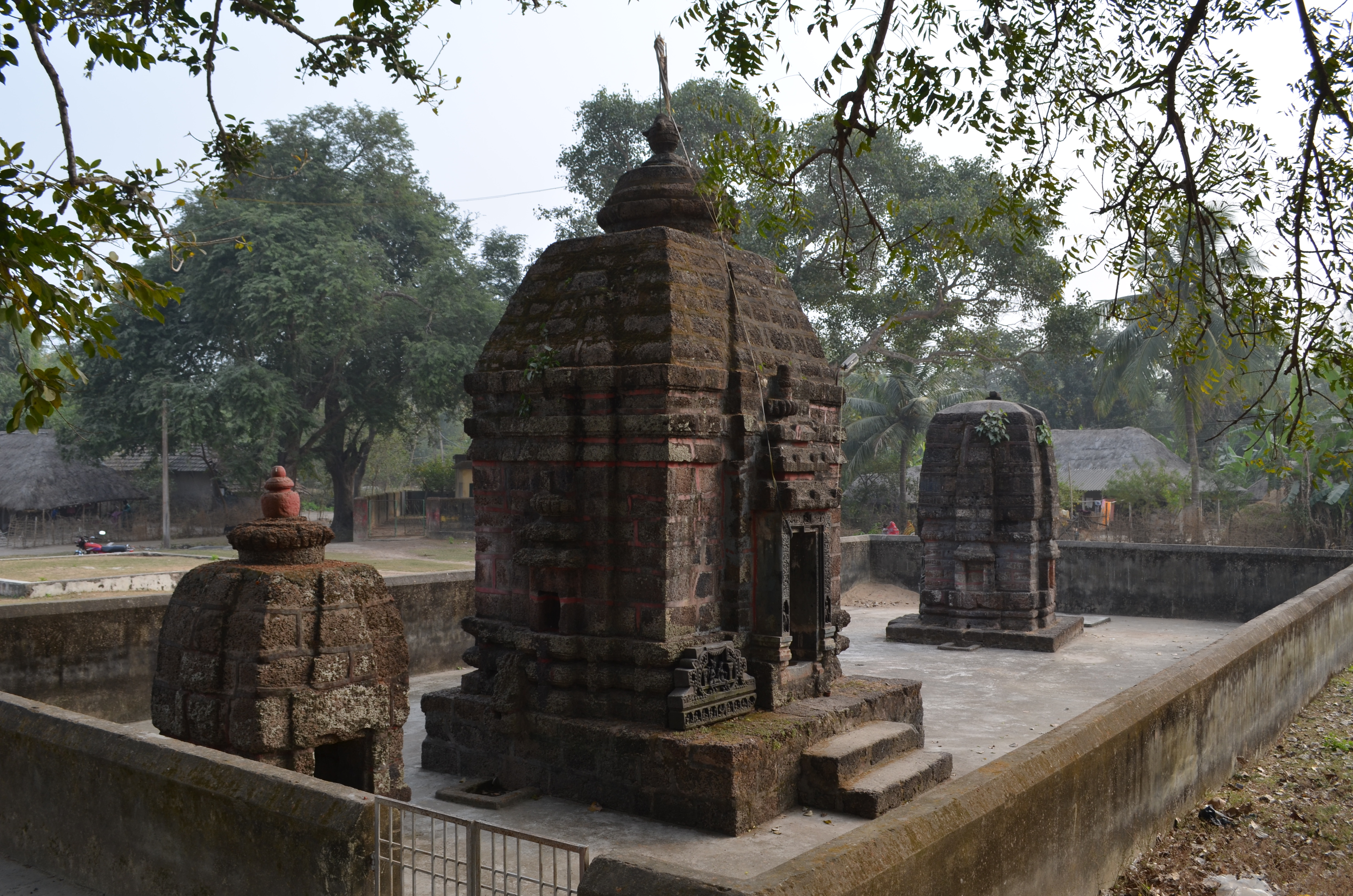
- Khajuresvara temple complex

- Location within Odisha

Religion
- Affiliation: Hinduism
- Festival: Jagara jatra

Location
- Location: Sergarh, Baleshwar, Odisha, India
- Interactive map of Khajuresvara temple complex
- Coordinates: 21°26′11.2″N 86°49′41.1″E

Architecture
- Style: Kalinga pancaratha-style
- Completed: 8-10th CE

Khajuresvara temple complex is a group of deula-complex in Odisha (former Orissa state), India. These Buddhist and Shaiva-Shakta temple complex is localed at Khajurasahi, Sergarh, Balasore. The Deula complex was built during 9-10th CE. There are several stone idols found to be placed in each of the deula. The largest deula, Khajuresvara, has been devastated. Later the idols from Khajuresvara were placed in a newly built deula. The idols worshiped in the different deulas are Shiva, Durga, Ganesha, Vaishnavi and Purushottama. The deulas were built based on Kalinga architecture. The deulas that are intact were built in the "khakara" style except one where the latter was built in "rekha" style. The newly built temple was built in "pidha" style. There are a few idols that are found in this temple which date back to the Somavamshi period and carved during 10-11th CE. The idols are mainly carved in laterite (locally known as "mankada pathara").

== Location ==
The temple complex is located in the middle of Khajurasahi, Sergarh, Baleswar on an elevated plain.

== Devastation ==
The largest deula of the entire complex was devastated after which a new cement-made deula was built. The "khakara" style deula of 8th CE is still intact.

== Gallery ==
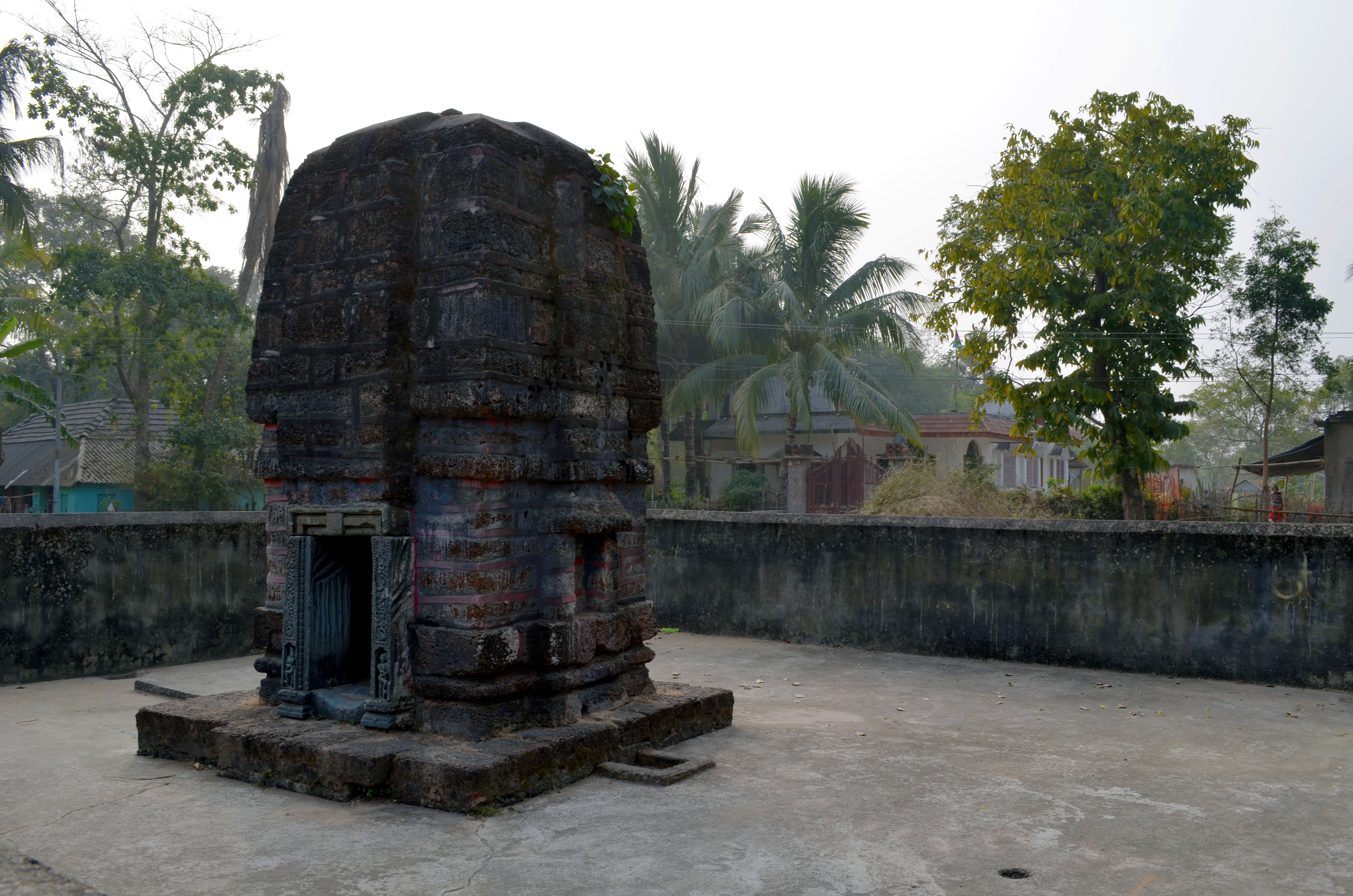
One of the deula of the complex

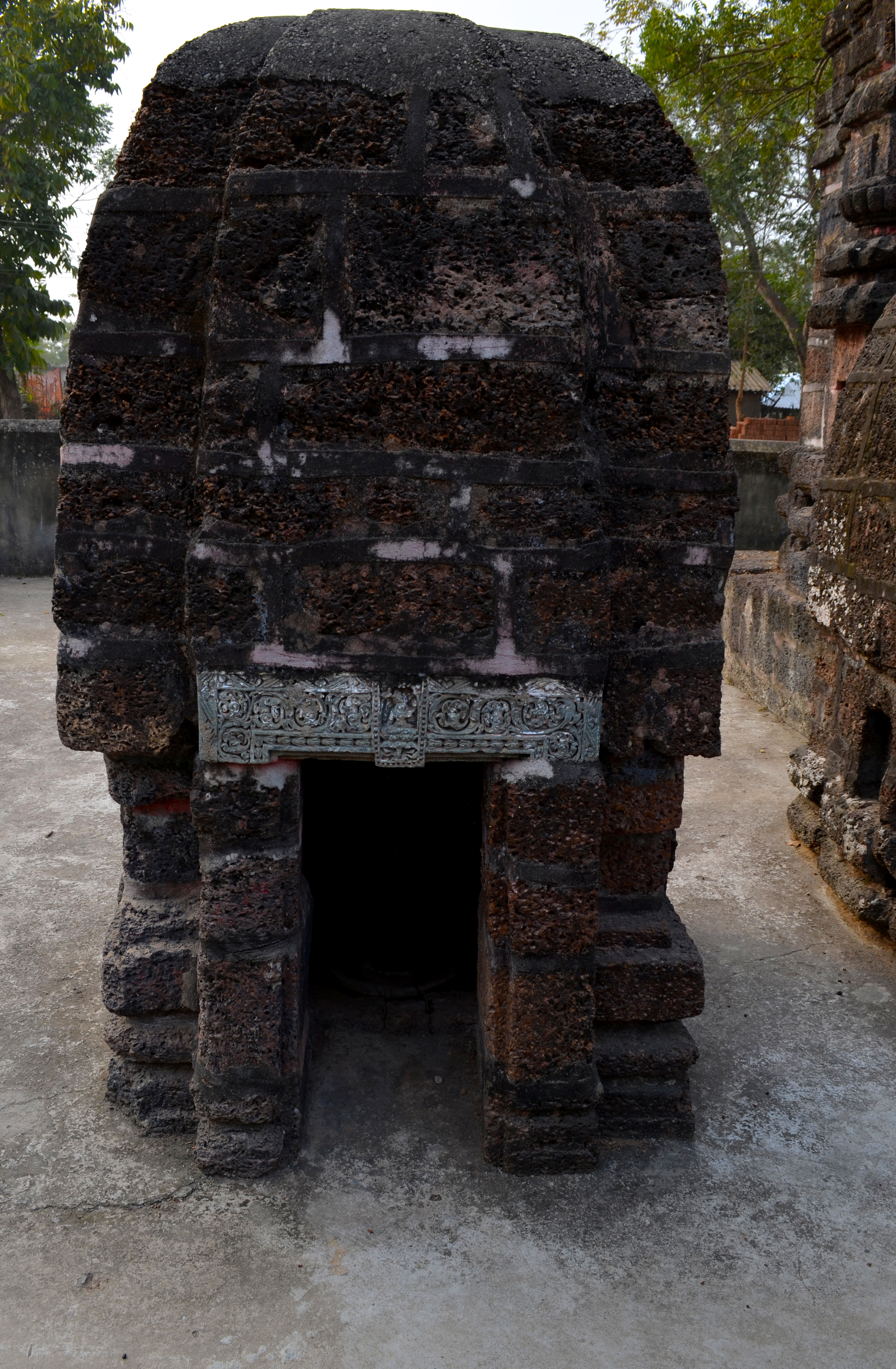
One of the deula of the complex

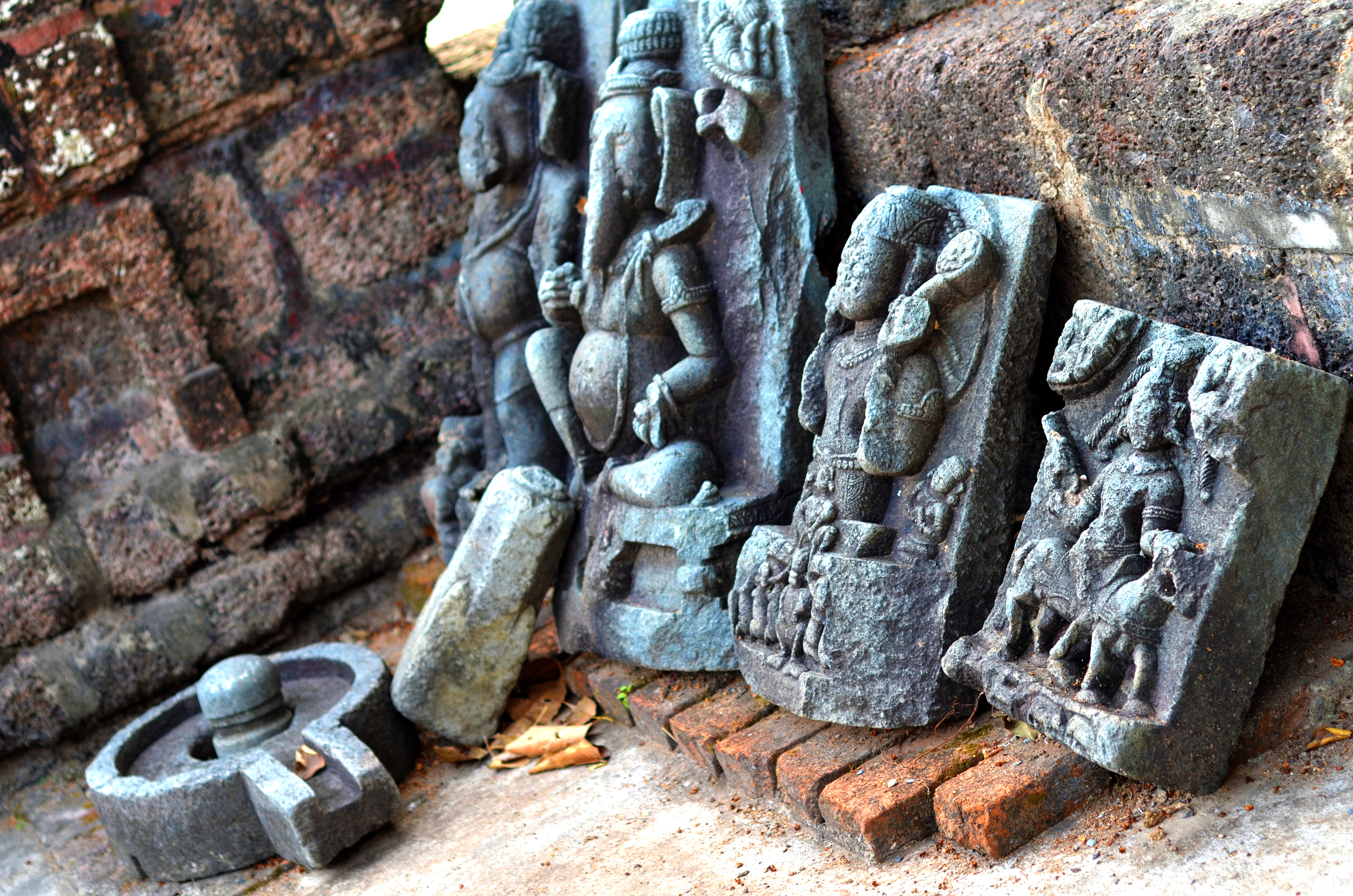
A few idols of the complex
