= Balangir Lok Mahotsav =

Festival in Odisha, India

Balangir Lok Mahotsav is generally held in every winter (Dec-Jan) in the Balangir town.

== The festival ==
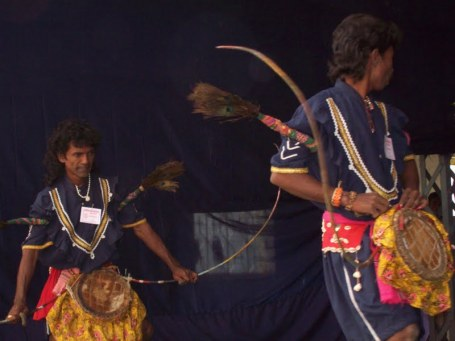
Nisan music players are dancing in the festival

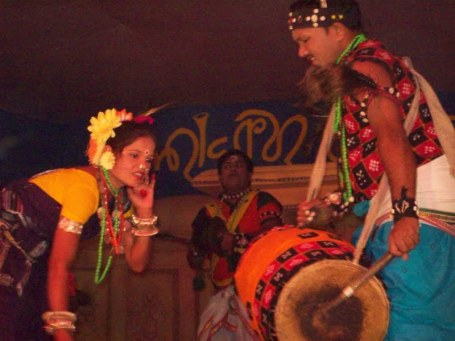
A dancer is dancing to the rhythm of dhol

The festival is celebrated for 2–4 days. The organizers attempt to bring the cultural associations from every part of the district together as this festival aim to popularize the traditional culture, songs, dances and musics. Several tribal and non-tribal communities showcase their rich heritage in this festival.

In addition, various rural communities sell their products viz. handicraft, paddy-craft, hand loom, earthen designs and food items in the festival markets. Such markets provide ample opportunities for the exchange of art and culture.

Time to time the organizers also felicitate young and famous talents from different places. Such festivals are also organized in different districts of Odisha. There was a demand to rename the festival as Kosal Tihar

== See also ==
- Pushpuni
- Jiuntia
- Dhanu Jatra
