= Astasambhu Siva Temples =

Astasambhu Siva Temple
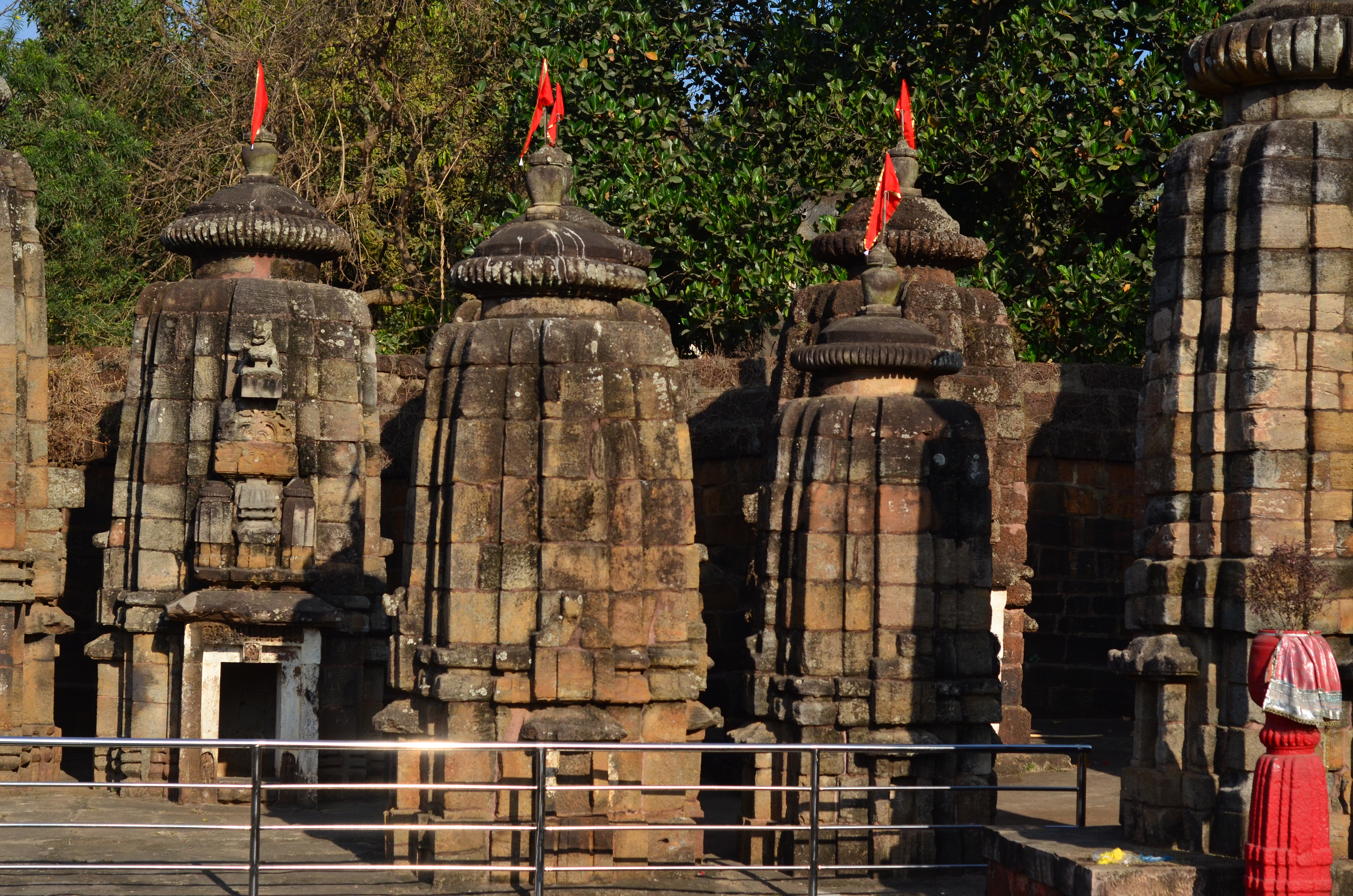

- Location in Odisha

Religion
- Affiliation: Hinduism
- District: Khurda
- Deity: Lord Siva

Location
- Location: Bhubaneswar
- State: Odisha
- Country: India
- Coordinates: 20°14′37.28″N 85°50′10.04″E

Architecture
- Type: Kalinga Architecture
- Completed: 10th century A.D.
- Elevation: 33 m (108 ft)

Astasambhu Siva Temples is a collection of 8 Hindu temples dedicated to Lord Siva located in Bhubaneswar, the capital of Odisha, India.

== The Temple ==
In the Uttaresvara Siva Temple precinct, there are eight temples of identical size and dimension locally known as Astasambhu. Ashta means eight and Sambhu refers to another name of Lord Shiva. Five of them are arranged in one alignment, also known as Panchu Pandava. According to architectural features like bada division and pabhaga mouldings, this temple was built around 10th Century A.D. This is a building made up of stones and its typology is Rekha Deul. The temple is surrounded by Godavari tank in the east, Uttaresvara Siva Temple compound wall in west, and Bindusagar tank in south beyond the compound wall. The temple has an east facing shrine.

== Architecture ==
The temple has a square vimanam (shrine) measuring 2.45 metres with a frontal porch of 0.53 metres. It's pancharatha(five chariots) is distinguished by a central raha and a pair of anuratha and kanika pagas on either sides of the raha. On elevation, the vimana is of rekha order that measures 5.72 metres in height from pabhaga to kalasa. From bottom to the top the temple has a bada, gandi and mastaka. With three fold divisions of the bada the temple has a trianga bada measuring 1.72 metres. At the bottom the pabhaga has four base mouldings of khura, kumha, pata, basanta that measures 0.47 metres. Jangha measures 0.90 metres and baranda measuring 0.35 metres thick has three mouldings. The gandi measuring 3.00 metres in height is devoid of any decoration and mastaka measures 1.00 metres with components like beki, amlaka, khapuri and kalasa.

The parsvadevata niches are located on the raha paga of the jangha on the three sides of north, west and south measuring 0.50 metres x 0.32 metres and with a depth of 0.20 metres. Except the southern niche, the rest two are empty. The niches are decorated with talagarbhika and urdhagarbhika of khakhara order. The southern niche houses a four armed Ganesha holding a parasu in his lower left, a rosary with varadamudra pose in lower right hand. His upper hands are broken. The deity is flanked on the top by two flying vidyadharas holding garlands in their hands. This temple is made up of coarse grey sandstone, construction technique is dry masonry type and construction type is Kalingan.

== Decorative features ==
The doorjamb is decorated with three vertical bands and measures 1.20 metres in height x 0.84 metres in width. At the base of the doorjamb there are dvarapala niches on either side measuring 0.28 metres in height x 0.12 metres in width and houses the Saivite dvarapala’s holding trident. At the lalatabimba there is a Gajalaxmi holding a lotus in her left hand and right hand is in Varada mudra. The architrave above the doorjamb carved with the traditional Navagrahas flanked by two atlantid ganas on either side.

== See also ==
- List of temples in Bhubaneswar
