= Jagannath Temple, Nayagarh =

Coordinates: 20.131731°N 85.092373°E

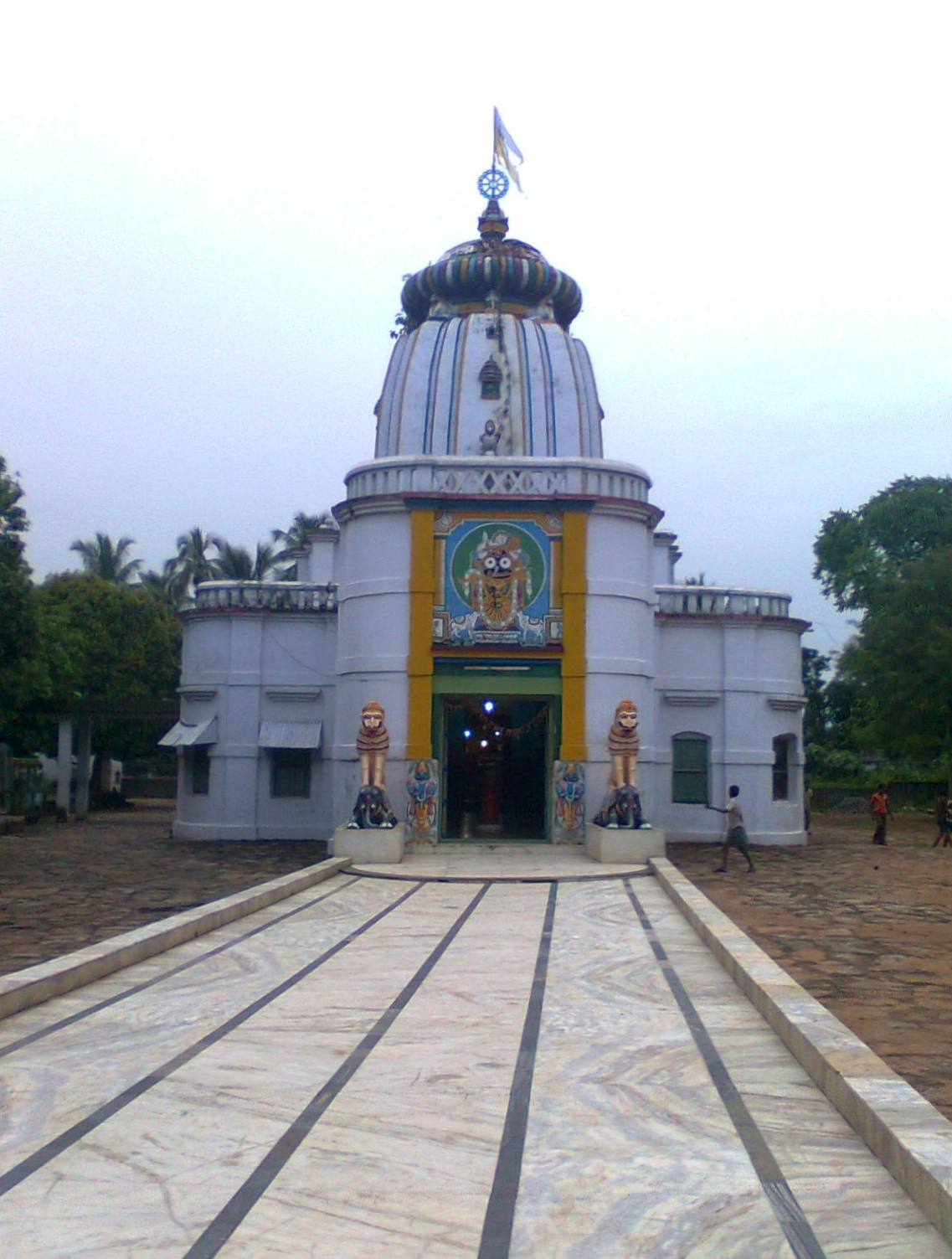

Religion
- Affiliation: Hinduism
- District: Nayagarh
- Deity: Lord Jagannath

Location
- Location: Nayagarh
- State: Odisha
- Country: India
- Interactive map of Jagannath Temple, Nayagarh

Architecture
- Completed: Between 1788 and 1808 CE

Jagannath temple is a Hindu temple at Nayagarh, Odisha, India. It was erected by Vinayak Singh Mandhata in between 1788 and 1808 CE. The architect of the unfinished temple was the father of the poet Yadumani. Jagannath temple at Laxmi Prasad area was erected by Jadunath Mangaraja, a king of Khandapada. It was reconstructed in 1972 by one Sri Nilakantha Sahu. Jagannath temple at Khandapada was erected by the king of Khandapada. The temple is in pancharatha Rekha Deula style, while the Jaga mohan and Natamandapa are in Pidha Deula style. The idol of Jagannath called DadhiVanana was brought from the temple at Tikiripada and installed here. The idols from this temple were installed there. Jagannath temple at Tikiripada was constructed with the stones of the tomb of Gosinha Daitya, a demon ruling in this area in the past, whose fort is located inside Baisipalli, also known as Gosinhagarh during the epic period. The first temple was constructed in 1850. It was due to the flood of the Mahanadi in that year. The Jagannath temple at Ranpur was erected by King Udhaba Singh in 1324-1363 CE. The Jagannath temple at Daspalla is also an old one and Rajapratisthita. Jagannath temple at Sikharpur (Saranakul) is a unique one where bread (Roti) is offered to the Lord, his queen built the Mukhashala. Main festival here is Rath Yatra and Snana Yatra.

== Images ==
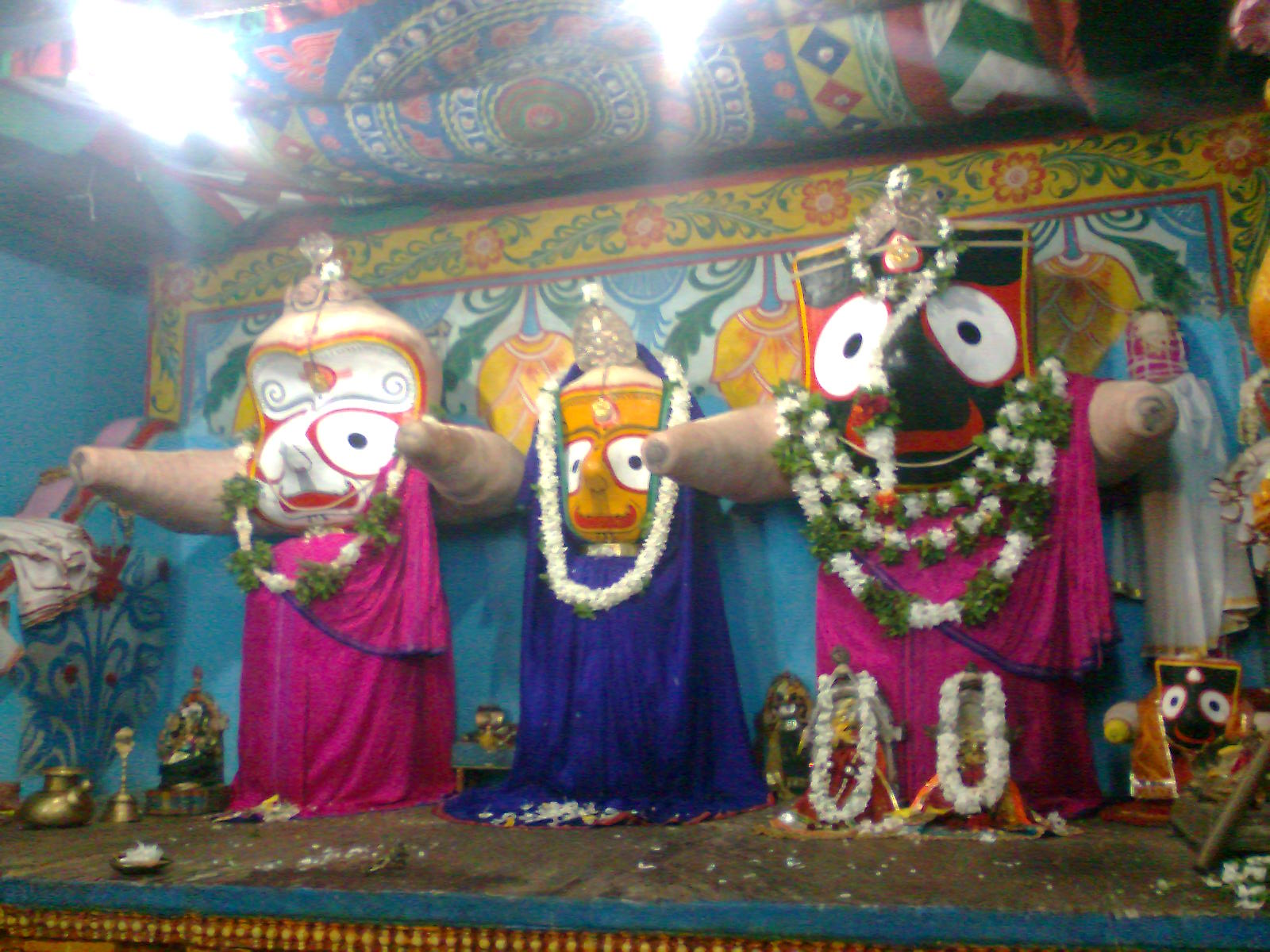
Jagannath, Balabhadra and Subhadra in Nayagarh temple, another shrine for Jagannath

== See also ==
- List of Jagannath Temples outside Puri
