= Uttaresvara Siva Temple =

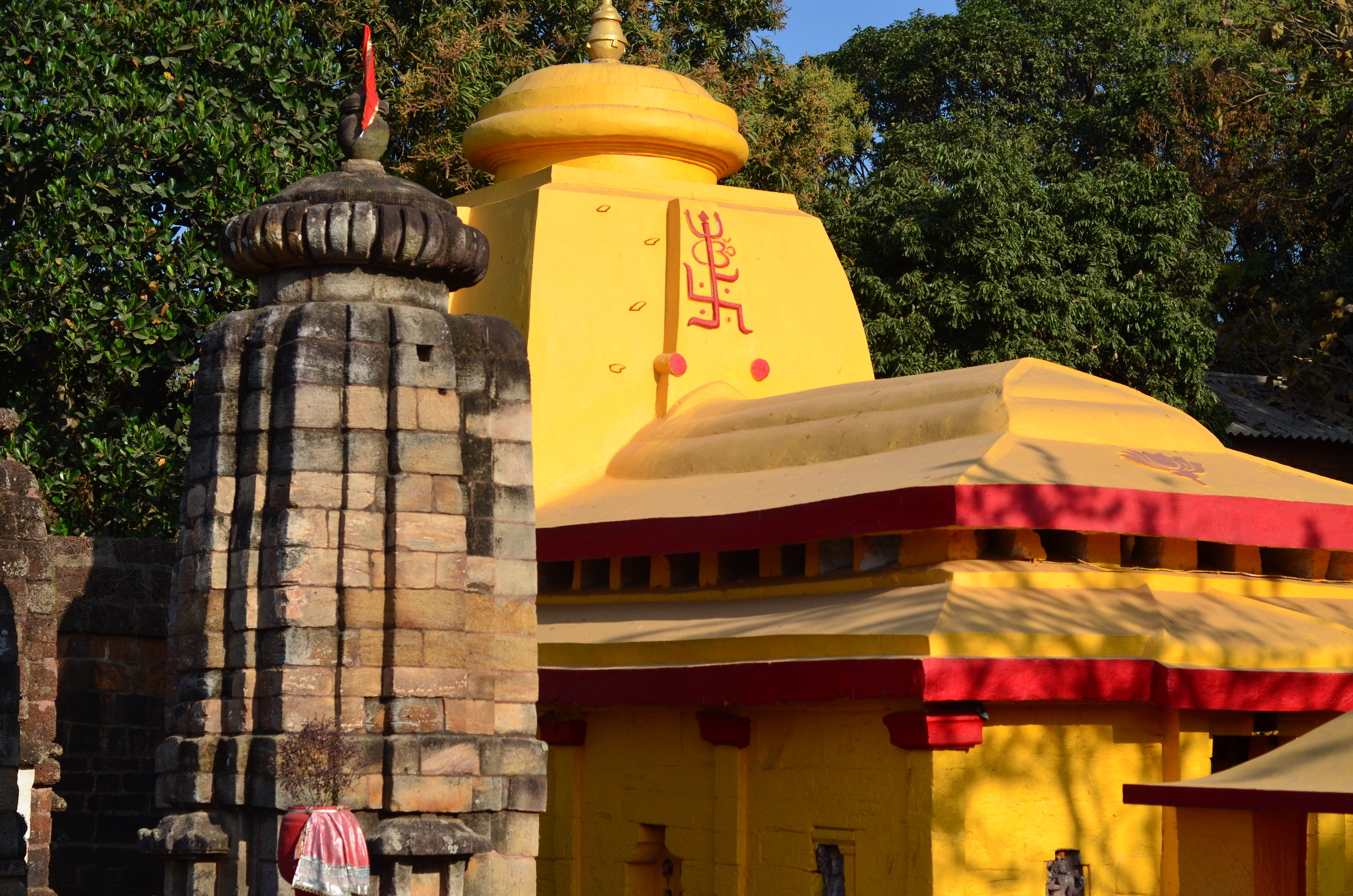

- Location in Odisha

Religion
- Affiliation: Hinduism
- Deity: lord siva

Location
- Location: Bhubaneswar
- State: Odisha
- Country: India
- Interactive map of Uttaresvara Siva Temple
- Coordinates: 20°14′37.4784″N 85°50′10.3452″E

Architecture
- Type: Kalingan Style (Kalinga Architecture)
- Completed: 12-13th century A.D.

Uttaresvara Siva Temple is a 12th-century Hindu temple dedicated to Lord Siva located in Bhubaneswar, Odisha, India.

== Location ==
Uttareswara Siva temple is located within a precinct in the northern embankment of Bindusagar tank near the Nalamuhana Sahi, Kedara-Gouri Chowk, Old Town, Bhubaneswar. The enshrining deity in this temple, Uttareswara Siva (Hiranyagarbha type) is only a circular yoni pitha at the centre of sanctum. Apart from that, there are statues of Bhairava and Bhairavi on both sides of the entrance to the Garbha Gruha.

Another attraction of the temple is the statue of Lord Nrusingha, which is located inside the main temple, facing Lord Uttareswara at the right side of the entrance to the main temple. The original temple has collapsed, as is evident from the renovation work above the pabhaga and the presence of cult images of an earlier phase on different parts of the temple walls, which do not conform to canonical prescriptions. It is the main temple within the precincts along with nine lesser shrines.

There are a few more temples, and a pond, the Godavari, is also located inside the precincts. The second biggest temple is Lord Bhimeswara. The Siva linga with a circular yoni pitha is at the centre of the sanctum.

Another deity of major importance in this temple is Ma Uttarayani. She is the Parshwa Devi of Lord Uttareswara facing the south on the outer wall of Uttareswara main temple. She is known as one of the Ashta Chandi-s of Lord Lingaraj. (The Ashta Chandi-s of Lingaraj are: Bindhya Bashini at Tala Bazar; Mohini at the southern part of Bindusagar; Ramayani or Rabani at Pujapanda Sahi on Ratha Road; Kapali of Tinimundia/Vaital Temple; Uttarayani; Gouri of Kedar-Gouri Temple; Ambika near Kotitirtheswara Temple and Dwara Vasini on Bindusagar Road). During the month of Chaitra an offering of Pana to Uttarayani is famous at this temple.

== Tradition & legends ==
According to the local tradition, this temple is so named as it is located in the northern embankment of Bindusagar and north of Lingaraj temple. The temple is one of the four pithas; the other pithas are Yoga pitha at Kharakhia Baidyanath, Bhoga pitha at Lingaraj and Siddha Pitha at KedaraGouri temple. Similarly Uttareswara was known as Tantra pitha.

== Architecture ==
Architectural features like pabhaga mouldings, rectangular flat roofed jagamohana and sculptures with 7th century iconographic traits reveals that it was established on 7th century A.D. but later construction might be on 19th century. It is a temple type building with Vimana and jaga mohan. Vimana is Rekha Deula whereas jagmohana is a rectangular flat roofed hall. The temple is surrounded by the lesser shrines of Bhimesvar in north Sahadevesvara in south and the compound wall on the eastern and western sides.

Kartikeya standing in a tribhanga pose is holding a spear(sula) in his left hand and the right hand rests over his thigh. He has jatamukuta, and wears beaded necklace and a female attendant is standing in his lefts. The northern raha niche houses a six armed Mahisamardini. She holds a wheel in lower left, a bow in second lower left and the third left hand rests over the demon Mahisasura. The deity holds a sword in lower right, a spear in the middle and an arrow in the third right hand. Her left leg is resting over the hip of the demon. The body of the demon is a buffalo whereas the face is that of a human. This image of Mahisamardini appears to be a later installation as Mahisamardini is not the parsva devata in a Siva temple. The southern raha niche enshrines the image of a four armed Siddhivinayaka Ganesha. He holds a nagapasa in upper left and parasu in upper right hand, modakapatra in lower left, and a staff in lower right hand. The jagamohana is a plain structural. It has three niches in the southern wall. The temple is devoid of ornamentation, but the pabhaga portion line drawings of chaitya design are noticed. At the lalatabimba there is a four armed Gajalaxmi seated in lalitasana over a lotus pedestal. The architrave above the doorjamb is carved with the traditional Navagrahas(nine planets).

== Significance ==
Rituals like Nrusimha Janma (birthday), Durgastami, Kartik Purnima, Shiva ratri, "Chaitra Mangalbar" are observed.

== Bhimesvara Siva temple ==
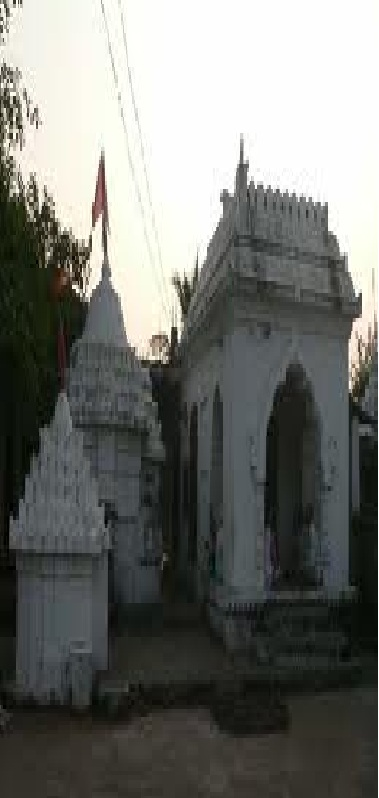
The temple structure

Bhimesvara Siva temple is located within the Uttaresvara Siva temple precinct, in the northern embankment of Bindusagar tank. The enshrining deity of this temple is a Siva lingam within a circular yoni pitha at the centre of the sanctum. This is a living temple facing east. The temple has a square vimana with a modern concrete hall in front of the vimana serves as the jagamohana. Like Uttaresvara Siva temple this temple was also renovated from pabhaga portion. On elevation, the vimana is of rekha order having bada, gandi and mastaka. With threefold divisions of bada the temple has a trianga bada. The parsvadevata niches are located in the jangha portion on three sides. The western raha niche houses a beautiful four armed Kartikeya standing over a lotus pedestal. His lower left hand rests over a cock and lower right hand holding the beak of his mount peacock. He is holding a dambaru in his upper left and a trident in upper right hand. The northern raha niche houses a four armed Parvati standing over a lotus petal. The deity holds lotus in her lower left, akshamala in lower right, a staff in upper left and a nagapasa in upper right arm. The southern niche houses a four armed Ganesha standing over a lotus pedestal. He holds a rosary in lower right, Varadamudra in upper left, lower left hand rests over the parasu whereas upper left hand holds a broken tooth. All the parsva devatas(supplementary deities) in the niches are recent installations. The doorjamb is carved with three plain vertical bands. At the lalatabimba there is a Gajalakshmi seated on a lotus pedestal. The deity holds a lotus in her left arm and right hand is in Varada mudra.

== Laterite Temple ==
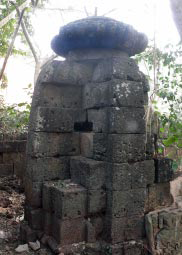
Laterite temple

The temple is located within the Uttaresvara Siva temple precinct. It is a dilapidated temple in the Uttaresvara Siva temple precinct. The temple is buried up to the bada portion. The temple as ascertained from the visible portion of the bada has a square pancharatha vimana (five chariot shrine).

== Godavari Tank ==
Godavari Tank is located inside the precinct of the temple. It is on the northern embankment of Bindusagar tank in Bhubaneswar, Orissa, India. The tank is enclosed by embankments made of dressed laterite blocks. The tank is a natural spring with an outlet channel leading into the Bindusagar. According to local tradition, after killing the demons Kirti and Basa goddess Parvati felt thirsty. In order to quench her thirst, Lord Siva struck his trident on earth where from a spring came out. In order to consecrate the water Siva invited all the river goddesses. Godavari could not come because of her menstrual cycle. On her absence Shiva cursed her that her water will be impure throughout except on the occasion of Kumbhamela when it would be most sacred for divinities and human being.

== See also ==
- List of temples in Bhubaneswar

== Bibliography ==
- Debala Mitra, ‘Bhubaneswar’ New Delhi, 1958, P. 29.
- K.C. Panigrahi, Archaeological Remains at Bhubaneswar, Calcutta, 1961. PP. 16–17.
- L. S.S. O’ Malley, Bengal District Gazetteer Puri, Calcutta 1908, P. 240.
- M.M. Ganguly, Orissa and Her remains, Calcutta, 1912, PP. 393–394.
- P.R. Ramachandra Rao, Bhubaneswar Kalinga Temple Architecture, Hyderabad, 1980, P. 29.
- R.P. Mohapatra, ‘Archaeology in Orissa’. Vol. I, Delhi, 1986. P. 57.
- R.L. Mitra. The Antiauities of Orissa, Vol.II, Calcutta, 1963, PP. 160–161.
- T.E. Donaldson, ‘Hindu Temple Art of Orissa’. Vol. I, Leiden, 1985, P. 76.
