= Deula =

Element in Hindu temple architecture

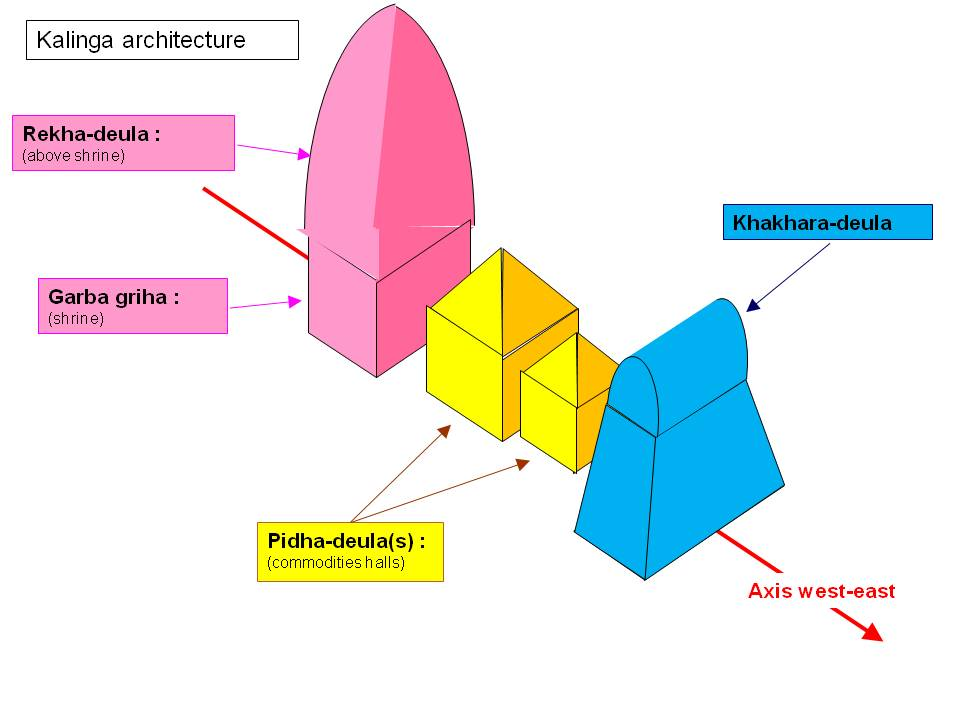
Simplified schema of a Kalinga architecture temple

Deula is an architectural element in a Hindu temple in the Kalinga architecture style of the Odishan temples in Eastern India. Sometimes the whole temple is also referred to as Deula. The word "deula" in Odia language means a building structure built with a particular style that is seen in most of the temples from Odisha. Deul is also used in English, though the deul temples are also of a different form in the Manbhum region of Western Bengal.

There are three types of Deulas: In terms of the general north Indian terminology, the Rekha Deula (rekha deul) is the sanctuary and the tower over it, respectively the garbhagriha and the shikhara, the Pidha Deula (pida deul) is the mandapa where the faithful are present. The Khakhara deula is an alternative form of tower over the sanctuary, which in shape resembles the oblong gopuram temple gatehouses in southern Dravidian architecture.

== Rekha Deula ==
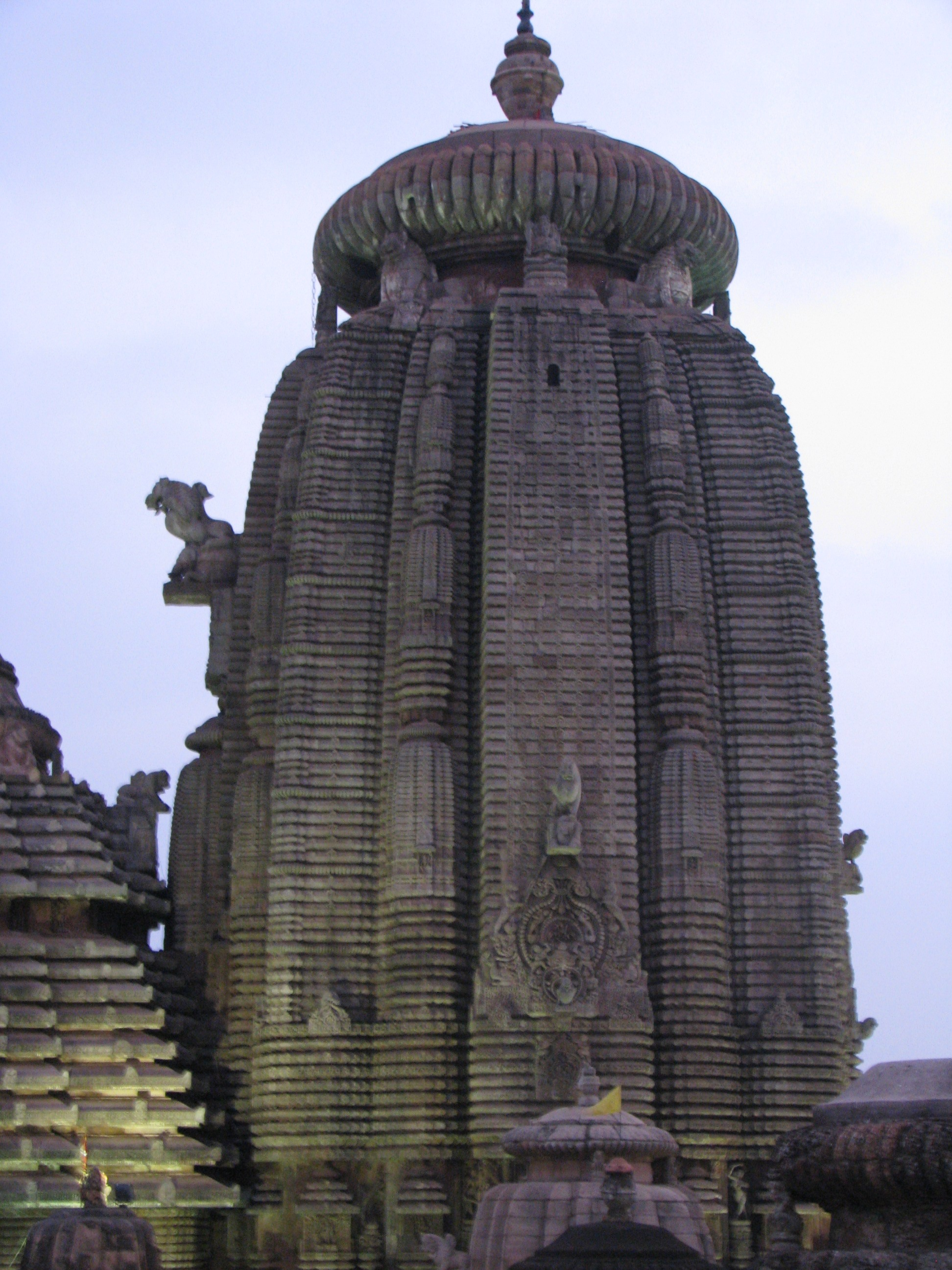
Lingaraja temple, example of a "shikhara deula".

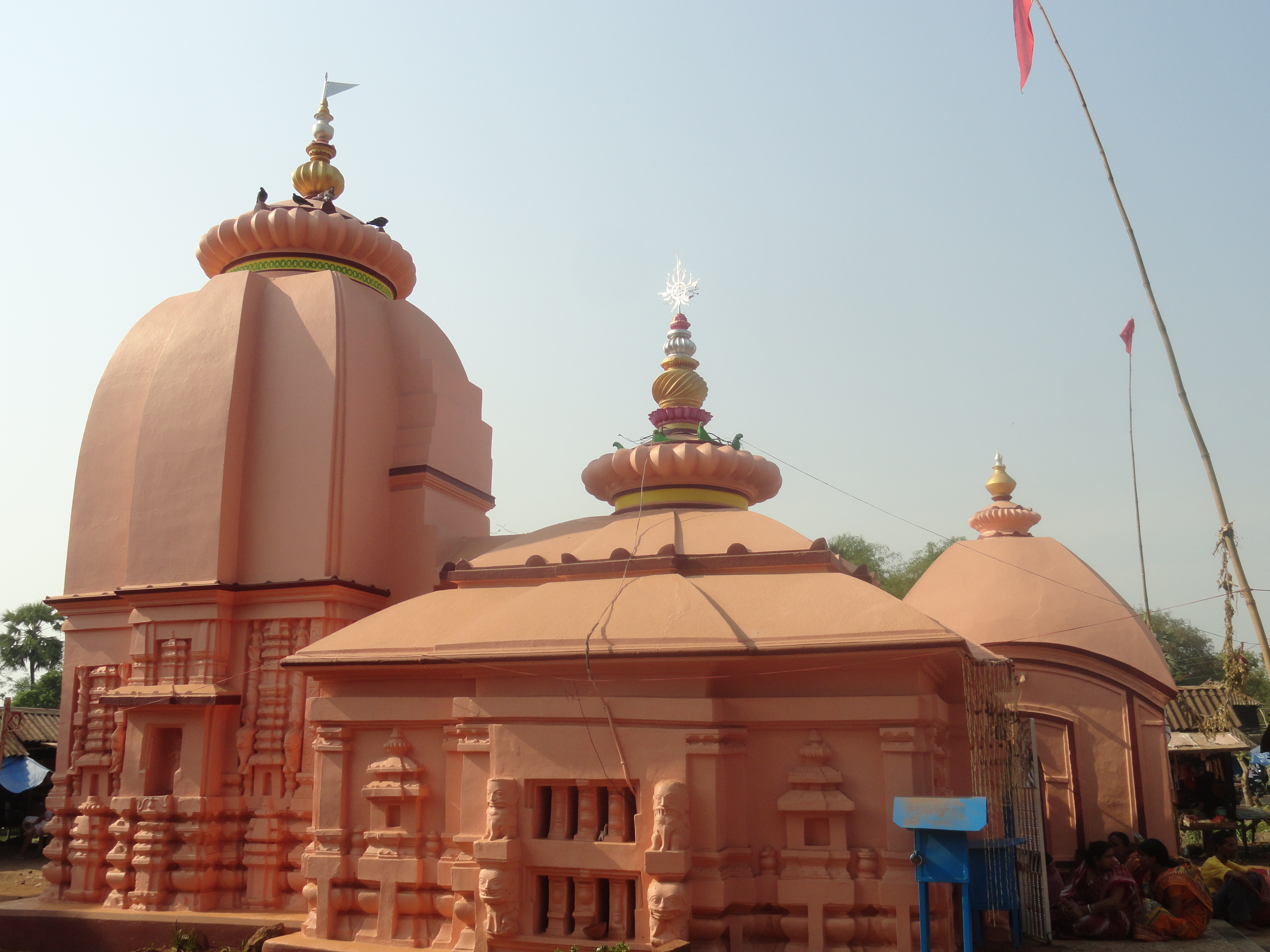
Shantinath Shiva temple at Shihar near Jayrambati, West Bengal.

Rekha in Odia means a straight line. It is a tall building with a shape of sugar loaf, looking like a Shikhara. It covers and protects the sanctum sanctorum (Garbhagriha). Examples :

- The Shikhara of the Lingaraja Temple in Bhubaneswar
- The Shikhara of the Jagannath temple in Puri
- Jagannath Temple in Nayagarh
- Uttaresvara Siva Temple in Bhubaneswar
- The Shikhara of Yameshwar Temple in Bhubaneswar
- The Shikhara of the Shantinath Shiva Temple at Shihar village near Jayrambati, Bankura, West Bengal

== Pidha Deula ==
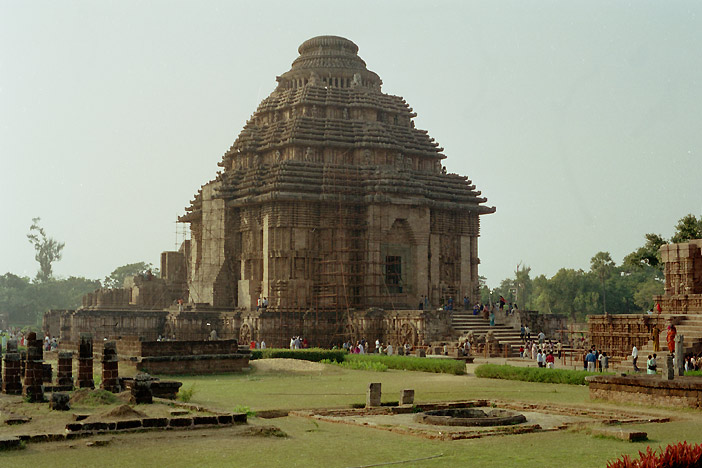
Konark Sun Temple, example of a "pitha deula" (the larger tower behind has fallen down).

It is a square building, typically with a pyramid-shaped roof, rather like the vimana towers over the sanctuaries of temples in southern Dravidian architecture. For the halls or service rooms of the temple. Examples

- The Jagamohana (assembly hall) of the Sun temple in Konârak
- The Jagamohana of Yameshwara Temple in Bhubaneswar
- The Jagamohana of the Shantinath Shiva Temple in Jayrambati, Bankura, West Bengal
- Digambara Jaina Temple, Khandagiri in Bhubaneswar

== Khakhara deula ==
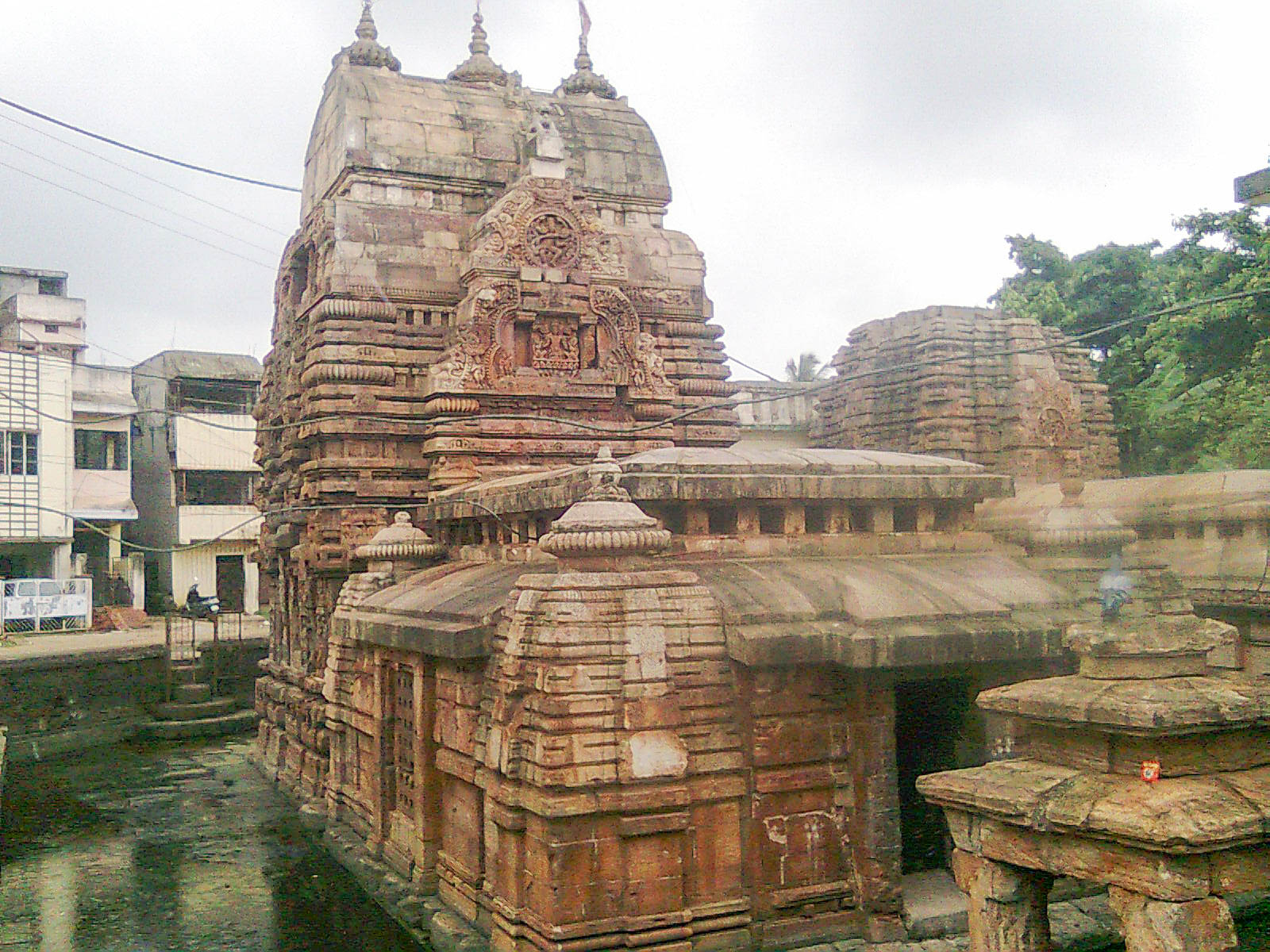
Baitala Deula example of a "khakara deula".

Khakara deula is a rectangular building with a truncated pyramid-shaped roof, like the gopuras. The name comes from Khakharu (gourd) because of the shape of the roof. The temples of the feminine deities as Shakti are temple of that type. Examples :

- Baitala Deula, Bhubaneswar (dedicated to Chamunda)
- Varahi Deula, Chaurasi, Puri district (dedicated to Varahi)
- Kedara Gouri, Bhubaneswar
- Narayani Temple, Khalikote (dedicated to Durga)
- Durga Temple, Banki
- Brahmi Temple, Chaurasi
