= Varahi Deula, Chaurasi =

Hindu temple of goddess Varahi in Chaurasi, India

Barahi Deula
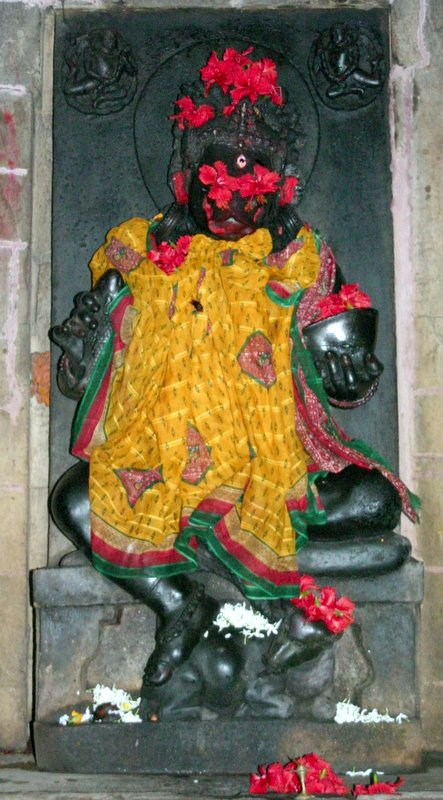
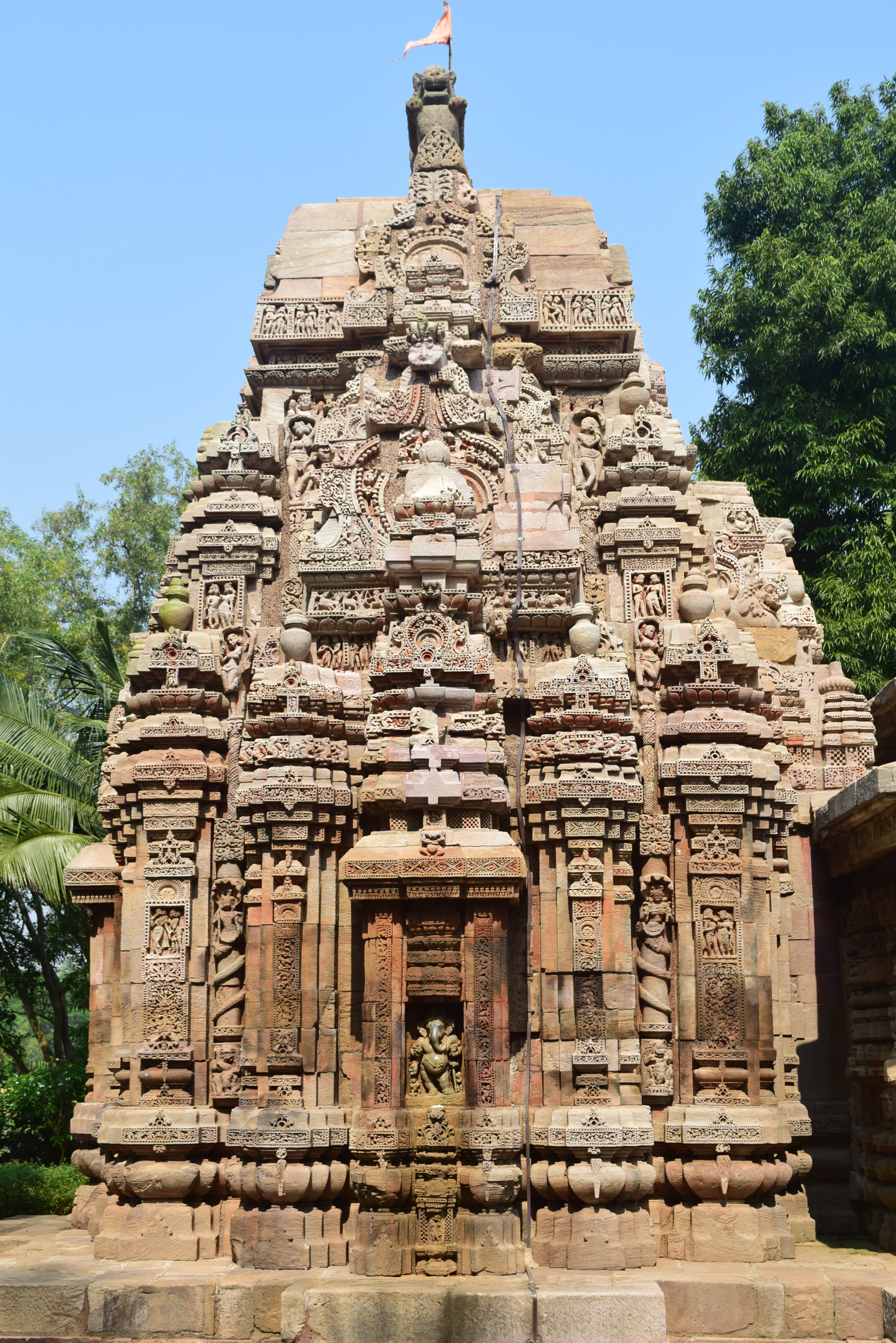
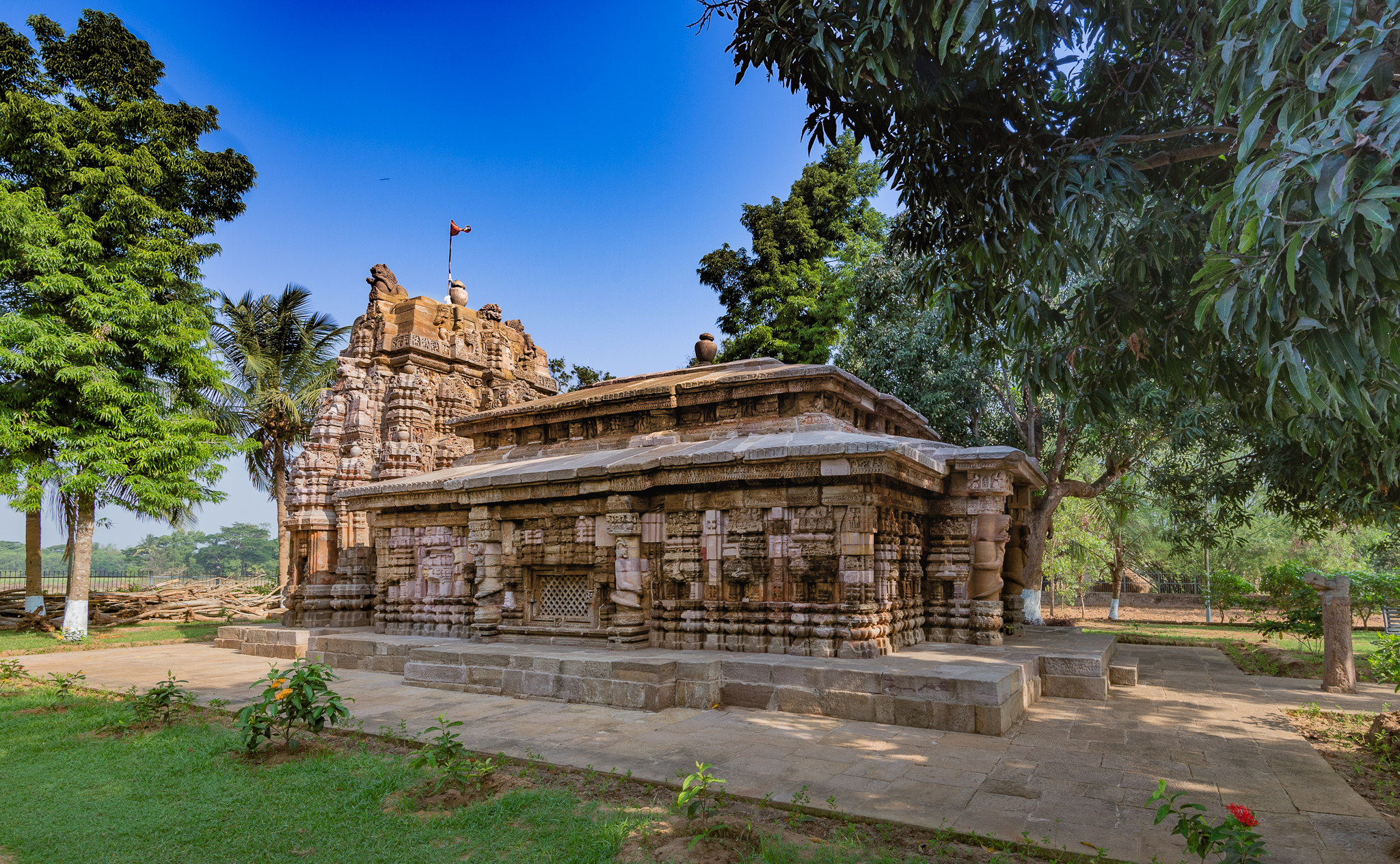
- Clockwise from top left : Central icon of Varahi Chaurasi temple holding fish and bowl, rear view, lateral view

- Location within Odisha

Religion
- Affiliation: Hinduism
- District: Chaurasi, Puri

Location
- Location: Puri
- State: Odisha
- Country: India
- Coordinates: 20°3′30.73″N 86°7′6.5″E

Barahi Deula (Odia:ବାରାହୀ ଦେଉଳ) is an ancient 10th century built temple situated on the eastern coast of Odisha in Puri district, India. The barahi temple of Chaurasi is unique in more than one way. The image enshrined in this temple is considered to be one of the masterpieces among the images of the deity found all over India.

== History and Tradition ==
This temple was built in honour of Varahi in the first quarter of 10th century A.D. during Somavamsi rule. The temple is east facing and built with Sandstone. The area dimension (L x B x H) of the temple is 15.84 m x 8.23 m x 8.40 m.

Varahi is believed to be the Sakti of Varaha. In the Tantric text 'Varahi Tantra' mention has been made of five forms of Varahi i.e., Svapna Varahi, Canda Varahi, Mahi Varahi (Bhairavi), Kruccha Varahi and Matsya Varahi. The description of Matsya Varahi closely corresponds to the image enshrined in the temple.

She has two arms and she is shown seated in lalitasana on a pedestal. Following the iconographic canons, the image bears the face of a boar and body of a divine woman. Her right hand holds a fish while the left hand holds a kapala. She has kept her right foot on her vahana (vehicle) buffalo which is seated on the pedestal at the bottom. Varahi is represented with a third eye on her forehead which is not clearly visible at present. Her hair is decorated in the form of spiral coils.

The beauty of this image lies in her big belly to indicate her as holding the universe in her womb. On the back slab two vidyadharas are represented each on either side. In addition to the main deity in the sanctum two more images of Varahi which are smaller than the main image are placed in the Jagamohana. Both of them are seated in ardhaparyankasana. Among them the image in the right niche is shown with a fish in her right hand and a kapala in her left hand. At the bottom a figure of naravahana is placed on the pedestal. The four-armed Varahi in the left niche holds a kapala in the lower left hand and is shown with Varada mudra in the corresponding right hand. The upper right hand holds a fish and left hand holds a rosary.

Varahi temple of Satabhaya (Kendrapara) Banchua (Keonjhar district), Narendrapur (Balasore district) are the other places in the state where she is worshipped. Images of Varahi have also been found from Puri, Jajpur, Dharmasala Ayodhya, Danagandar, Kisenpur, Tarapur, Padagadi, Kantilo, Garudapancana, Bayalishbati, Chatesvar, Bhubaneshwar, Pallur Kanchipuram.

== Architecture ==
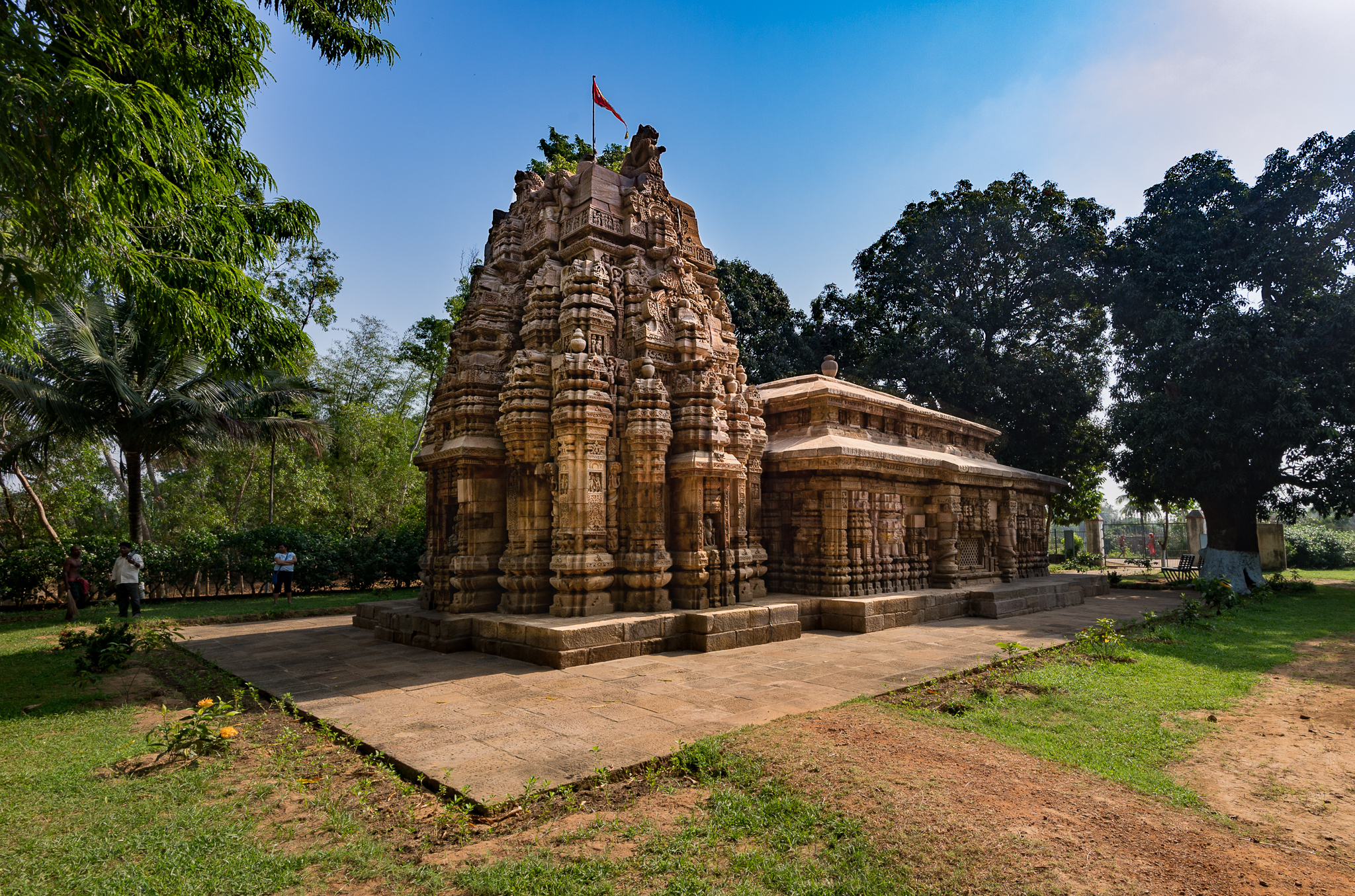
Rear lateral view of temple

Viewed from architectural point, the temple of Varahi in Chaurasi is the most beautiful monument in the Prachi Valley. This temple marks a significant deviation from the usual tradition of Rekha and the Bhadra type and exhibits a novel style which according to Orissan nomenclature is of Khakhara or Gaurichara variety. The ground plan of it somewhat resembles that of the Baitala Deula in Bhubaneswar, but while the plan of the latter admits of no regular ratha protection, this temple presents a pancharatha type both in plan and construction.4 The Vimana is rectangular in cross section and with its elongated vaulted roof and other architectural features it resembles more with the Gauri temple of Bhubaneswar than with the Vaital temple. The vase of the Vimana measures 18 ft by 22 ft and height of it is 27 ft. The Jagamohana which is also rectangular in shape like that of the Parsuramesvara is a pidha temple with seven distinct tires of pidhas. The walls of both the Vimana and Mohana are beautifully decorated with the figural and arabesque motifs and maintain a high order of balance and rhythm.

The noteworthy reliefs are found on a single board that surrounds the whole jagamohana just below the baranda where scenes from Ramayana such as killing of the illusory deer, the abduction of Sita, the murder of Jatayu, the uprooting of seven palm trees, the murder of Vali, the construction of the bridge over the sea are depicted with grace and precision. The majestic moulding, designs and carvings of the entire temple are found in remarkable varieties and profusion not being overdone and accentuated the singular beauty and richness of the monuments in a manner that was hitherto unknown in the Prachi Valley.

The main temple is like the Khakhara style belonging to Kalinga Kingdom architecture. Other such example is Vaital Deula, in Bhubaneshwar.

Spreading over about 2 acres of land, this shrine is Shakta and the presiding deity of the temple is Goddess Varahi, locally called as Matsya Varahi. She sits in lalitasana on a cushion placed on a plain platform with her right foot resting on the buffalo mount carved on the pedestal. She is presented as the pot-bellied goddess with the face of a boar. She has two arms and holds a fish in her right hand and a bowl in her left hand. A third eye is tightly engraved into her forehead. Here Barahi is worshipped in accordance with the tantric rituals. Goddess Varahi is offered fish every day.

The semicylindrical shape of the temple shows the variation from the medieval temples of Odisha. Daily the Mahaprasad of Lord Jagannath comes to this temple.

== Festivals ==
Major festivals includes Vijaya Dashami and a fair in Chaitra.

== Location ==
Chaurasi is situated between Nimapada-Kakatpur road and is at a distance of 30 kilometers from Konark and 14 kilometers from Kakatpur village with easy transport available from Puri and Konark. The easiest way to reach the temple is to drive 29 km to Charichhaka, take a right turn and drive 3 km to Amareshwar village and then take a left turn and drive 1.8 km.

Best route BHUBANESWAR to Kakatpur by bus. Get down next to Tulasipur. Bus driver will guide you to Vaarahi temple. From main road you can find an autoriksa to temple which is 2 km away. Only early morning hours Pooja. The person in charge will allow you inside the temple. BHUBANESWAR to temple nearly 56 km.
