= Jiuntia =

Indian festival in Western Odisha

Jiuntia or Juntia or Jutiya festivals are well known festivals of Western Odisha region. These are celebrated in every village and town of western Odisha region in the month of “Aswina", which is September–October in the Gregorian calendar. There are two types, Pua Jiuntia and Bhai Jiuntia. Pua Jiuntia is generally observed by mothers to invoke the grace of Lord “Dutibahana” for the long life and prosperity of their sons; whereas on the occasion of Bhai Jiuntia the sisters worship goddess “Durga’ for the prosperity of their brothers. Puajiuntia and Bhaijiuntia festivals are celebrated on the day of the dark fortnight and on the 8th day of the bright fortnight respectively.
