= Jagamohana =

Hindu architectural feature

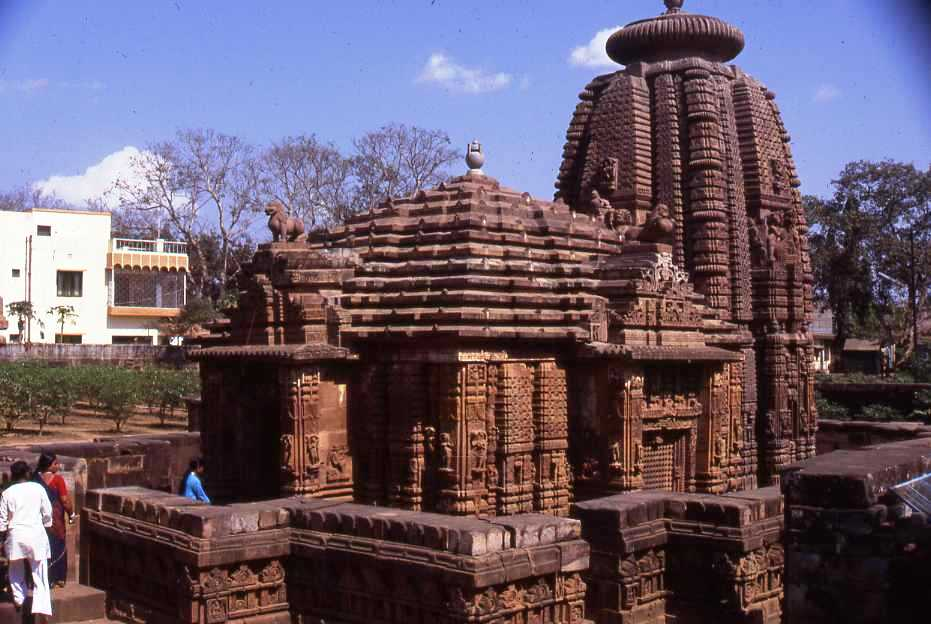
The jagamohana in front of the shikhara, Mukteshvara Temple, Bhuvaneswar

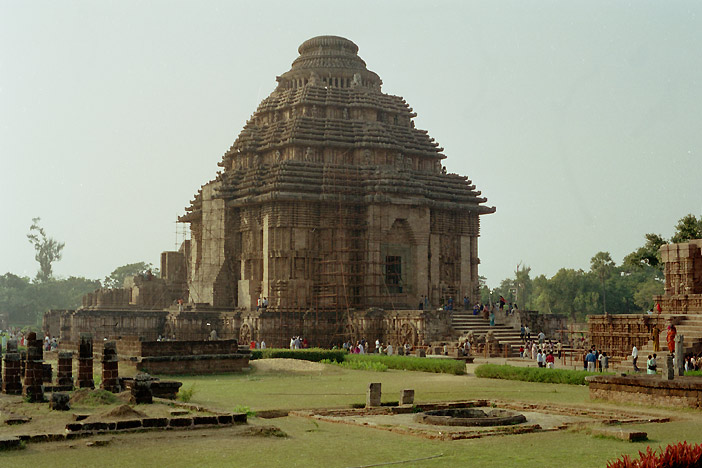
The jagamohana of the Konarka Sun Temple

A Jagamohana (Sanskrit: जगमोहन, romanized: jagamōhana), also rendered Jagamohana (Odia: ଜଗମୋହନ) is an assembly hall in Hindu temple architecture, especially found in the region of Odisha.

== Overview ==
A jagamohana is located in front of the main shrine of the temple, called the garbhagriha. It is typical of the Nagara architecture temples of northern India. In the south of India, the halls are named mandapas, which are often large halls with columns.

As in a garbhagriha, it is most often built on a plan based on structures of squares and circles. However, for the temples of goddesses, the jagamohana is built on a plan based on structures of rectangles and triangles. Such as for example the plan of the temple of Varahi Deula at Chaurasi near Puri in Odisha.

Generally, the garbhagriha is a windowless and sparsely lit chamber, intentionally created thus to focus the devotee's mind on the tangible form of the divine within it. On the contrary, the jagamohana is highly decorated with sculptures of deities, mythological scenes, or ornaments.

The most famous jagamohana is that of the Konark Sun Temple. Due to the collapse of the main temple tower (shikhara), the jagamohana now appears to be the main building of the temple.
