= Parshvanatha temple =

Parshvanatha temple may refer to these Jain temples in India dedicated to Parshvanatha:

- Parsvanath Jain Temple-I, Khandagiri, Odisha
- Parsvanath Jain Temple-II, Khandagiri, Odisha
- Parshvanatha Basadi, Gundwad, Karnataka
- Parshvanatha Basadi, Halebidu, Karnataka
- Parshvanatha temple, Jaisalmer Fort, Rajasthan
- Parshvanatha temple, Ranakpur, Rajasthan
- Parshvanatha temple, Khajuraho, Madhaya Pradesh
- Parshvanatha temple, Pavagadh, Gujarat
- Shankheshwar Parshvanath Jain Temple, Belgium
- Parshvanatha basadi, Shravanabelgola, Karnataka
- Parshvanath Jain temple, Varanasi, Uttar Pradesh
