= Parsvanath Jain Temple-II =

- Location in Orissa

Religion
- Affiliation: Jainism
- Deity: Parshvanatha

Location
- Location: Bhubaneswar, Orissa
- Coordinates: 20°16′14″N 85°47′08″E

Architecture
- Style: Kalingan Style (Kalinga Architecture)
- Completed: 20th century A.D.
- Elevation: 87 m (285 ft)

Parsvanath Jain Temple – II is located in Bhubaneswar. This temple is located in the Digambar Jain Temple precinct in Khandagiri. The temple is still used for worship. It faces towards the east. The cell measures 6.50 metres in length and 4.10 metres in width. The enshrined image in it is of Parsvanatha in a standing pose, crowned with a serpent hood. At the base two diminutive male images are on either side. The main image is flanked by four Jain meditators each with two images.

== Age ==
Temple belongs to 20th century.

== Significance ==
Associational significance: Bengal, Bihar and Orissa Digambara Jaina Tirthankara Committee.

== Physical description ==
Surrounding: The temple is surrounded by Rushavanath temple in north at a distance of 9.00 metres, Parsvanath temple No-I in north-west at a distance of 3.30 metres, compound wall of the precinct in south.
Orientation: The temple is facing towards east.
Architectural features (Plan and Elevation): On plan, the Sanctum chamber measure 6.50 metres in length and 4.10 metres in breadth. The roof is a R.C.C. concrete slab.

Building material: Cement concrete and Brick masonry.
Style: Kalingan
