= Parsvanath Jain Temple-I =

- Location in Orissa

Religion
- Affiliation: Jainism
- Deity: Parsvanatha

Location
- Location: Bhubaneswar
- State: Orissa
- Country: India
- Interactive map of Parsvanath Jain Temple-I
- Coordinates: 20°16′14″N 85°47′08″E

Architecture
- Style: Kalingan Style (Kalinga Architecture)
- Established: 20th century AD
- Elevation: 87 m (285 ft)

Parsvanath Jain Temple – I is located in Digambara Jain Temple precinct in Khandagiri, Bhubaneswar. It is a living temple. The temple is facing towards east. The enshrined deity is Parsvanath. This image is made of marble. This image measures 2.80 metres in height x 1.05 metres width. The image is flanked by two sculptural panels carved with two images in each panel.

== Age ==
Temple belongs to 20th century.

== Physical description ==
Surrounding: The temple is surrounded by Rushvanath temple in north at a distance of 1.70 metres, Parsvanath temple No-II in south-east at a distance of 3.30 metres, compound wall in west at a distance of 8.40 metres. Orientation: The temple is facing towards east.
Architectural features (plan and elevation): On plan, the temple sanctum chamber measures 4.60 square metres with R.C.C. flat roof.
Construction techniques: Dry masonry
Style: kalingan
