= Udayagiri and Khandagiri caves =

Ancient caves in India

Udayagiri and Khandagiri Caves
- Kattaka Caves
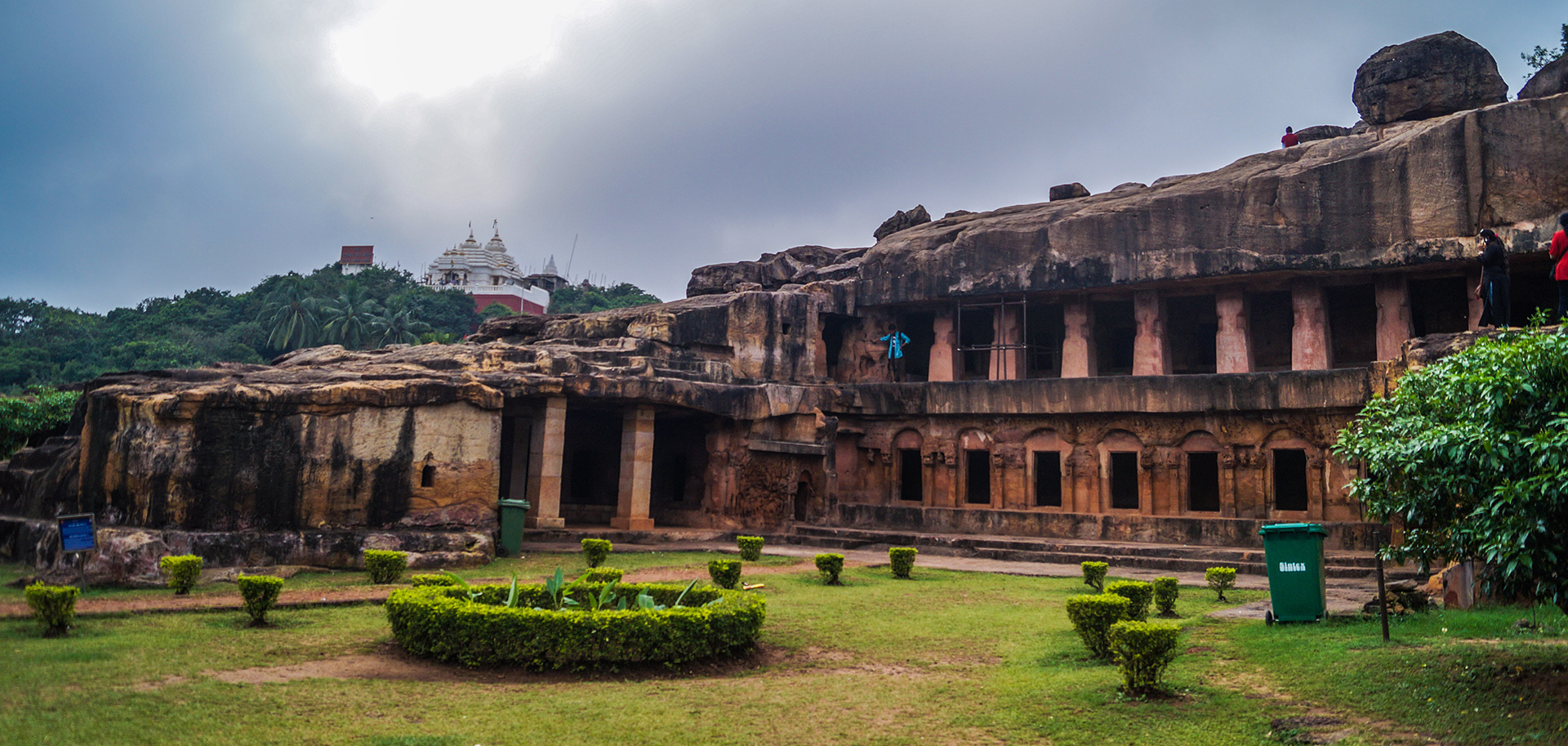
- Udayagiri caves

- Location within India Location within Odisha
- Location: 3 km south of Bhubaneswar in Odisha, India
- Coordinates: 20.2628312°N 85.7860297°E

Udayagiri and Khandagiri caves, formerly called Kattaka Gumpha or Cuttack caves, are partly natural and partly artificial caves of archaeological, historical, and religious importance, located 3 km south of the city of Bhubaneswar in Odisha, India. The caves are situated on two adjacent hills, Udayagiri and Khandagiri mentioned as Kumari Parvata in the Hathigumpha inscription. They have a number of finely and ornately carved caves built during the 2nd or 1st century BCE. It is believed that most of these caves were carved out as residential blocks for Jain monks during the reign of King Kharavela. Udayagiri means "Sunrise Hill" and has 18 caves, while Khandagiri has 15 caves.

The caves of Udayagiri and Khandagiri, called lena or leṇa in the inscriptions, were taken out mostly during the reign of Kharavela for the abode of Jain ascetics. The most important of this group is Ranigumpha in Udayagiri which is a double-storeyed monastery. Other important caves include Hathi Gumpha, Ananta Gumpha, Ganesha Gumpha, Jaya Vijaya Gumpha, Mancapuri Gumpha, Bagha/Byaghra/Vyaghra Gumpha and Sarpa Gumpha.

The Archaeological Survey of India (ASI) has listed that Udayagiri and Khandagiri Caves be in the list of "Must See" Indian Heritage.

The Udayagiri and Khandagiri Caves are listed as an Adarsh Smarak Monument by ASI.

== Count of the caves ==
B. M. Barua, based on a reading of line 14 of the Hathi Gumpha inscription, declared that a total of 117 caves were excavated by Kharavela and others on the Kumari hill (Udayagiri). Marshall has counted more than 35 caves in both the hills, while M.M. Ganguli has enumerated only 27 caves.

The number of existing caves at Udayagiri is 18, while Khandagiri has 15. The local names of the existing caves are listed below, numbered according to the enumeration of the Archaeological Survey of India.

== The famous caves ==
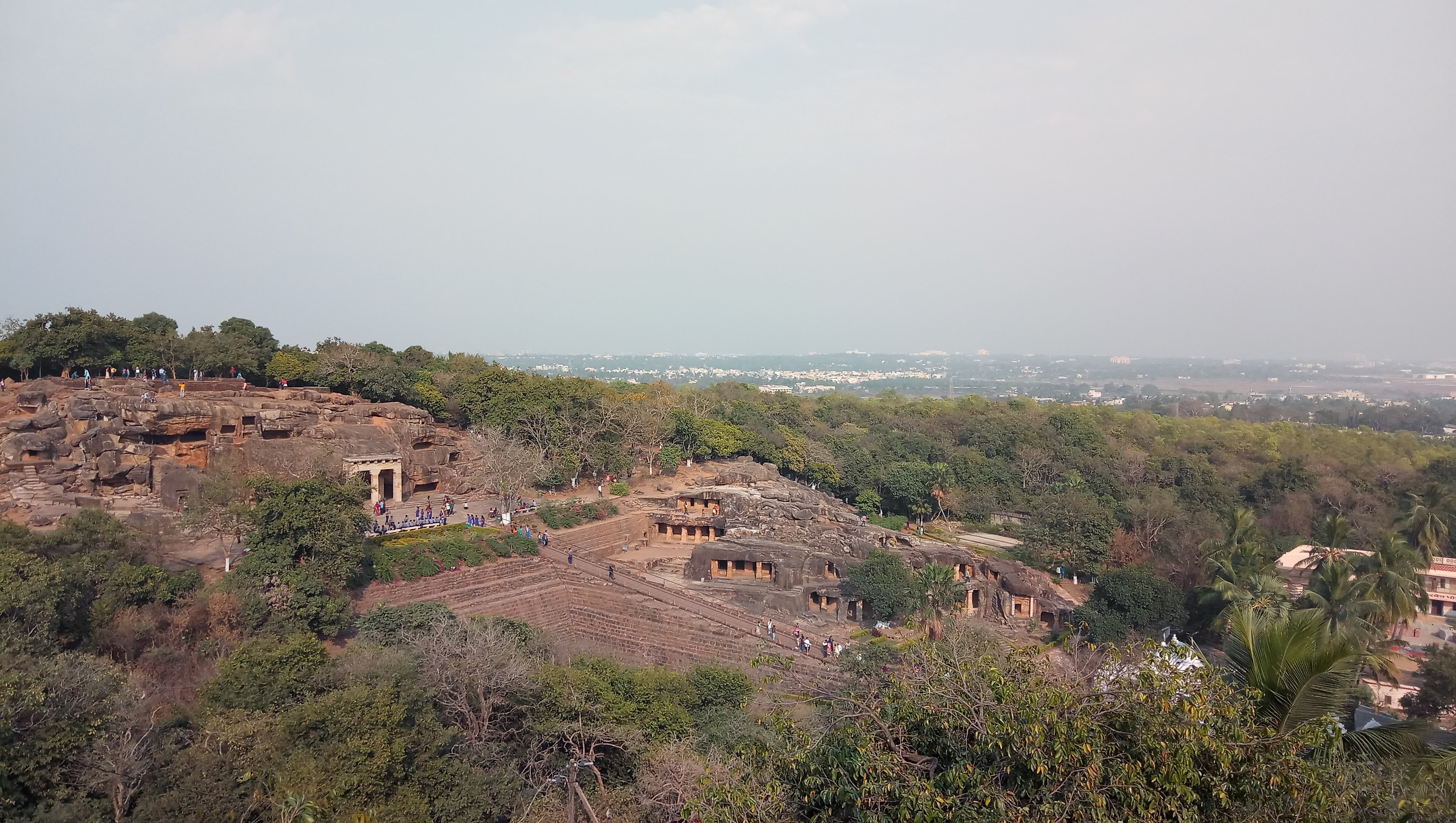
Udayagiri and Khandagiri Caves in Bhubaneswar, Odisha.

In Udayagiri, Hathi Gumpha (cave 14) and Ganesha Gumpha (cave 10) are especially well known for their historically important sculptures and reliefs. Raninka Na'ara (Queen's Palace Cave, Cave 1) is also an extensively carved cave and elaborately embellished with sculptural friezes. Khandagiri offers a fine view back over Bhubaneswar from its summit. The Ananta Cave (Cave 3) depicts carved figures of women, elephants, athletes, and geese carrying flowers.

== Udayagiri caves ==
The Udayagiri hills are on the right-hand side as the visitor approaches from Bhubaneswar. Compared to Khandagiri, Udayagiri offers more beautiful and better maintained cave shrines. There are 18 caves in Udayagiri:

1. Rani Gumpha "Cave of the Queen"

Rani Gumpha is the largest and most popular cave among the caves of Udayagiri and Khandagiri. The word Rani means "queen". Although it is not an architectural marvel, it has some ancient beautiful sculptures.

This cave is double storeyed. Each storey has three wings and the central wing is bigger among all the three wings. The lower floor has seven entrances in the middle wing whereas the upper floor has nine columns. The upper portion of the central wing has relief images depicting the victory march of a king. Many of the cells have carved dwara pala images; some of them are disfigured. The area that connects the central wing with right and left wings have some panels where the sculptures of wild animals, fruit-laden trees, human figures, women playing musical instruments, monkeys and playful elephants are found. The pilasters contain the torana (arches) decorated with sculptures of Jain religious importance and royal scenes.

Cave No.1 "Rani Gumpha" (Cave of the Queen)
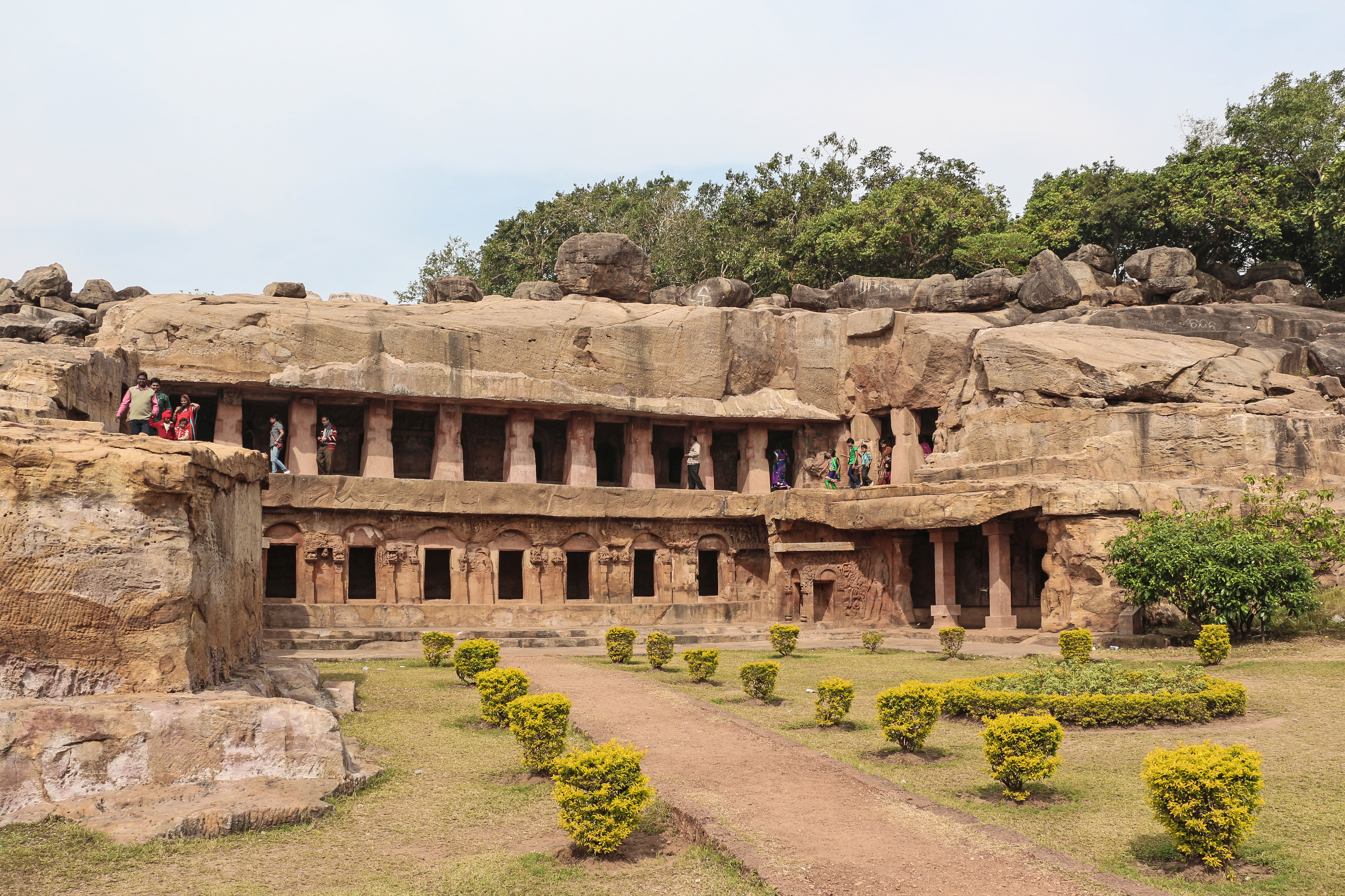
General view

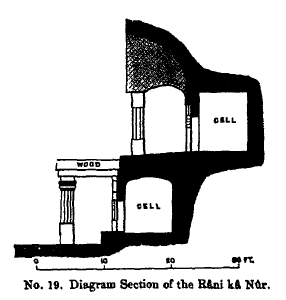
Diagram section of Rani Gumpha

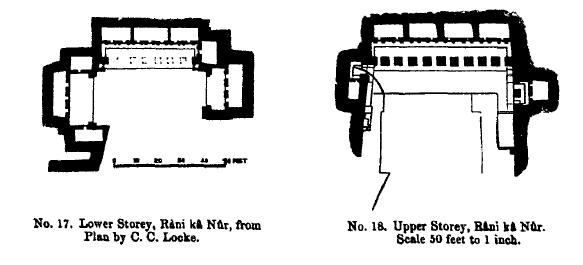
Plans of both floors of Rani Gumpha

Ground floor
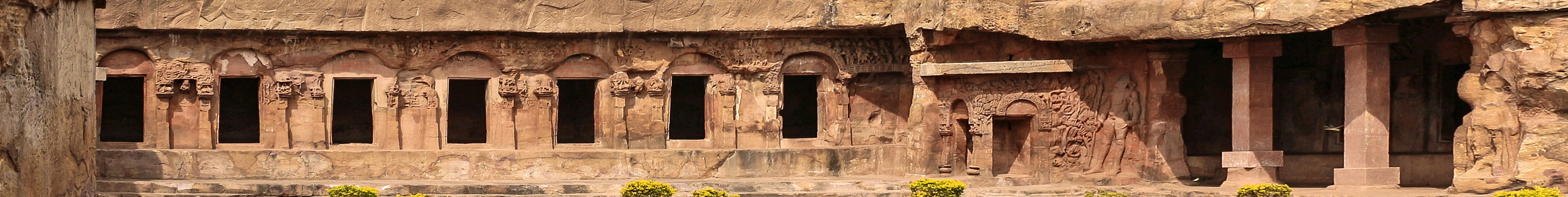
Rani Gumpha ground floor.
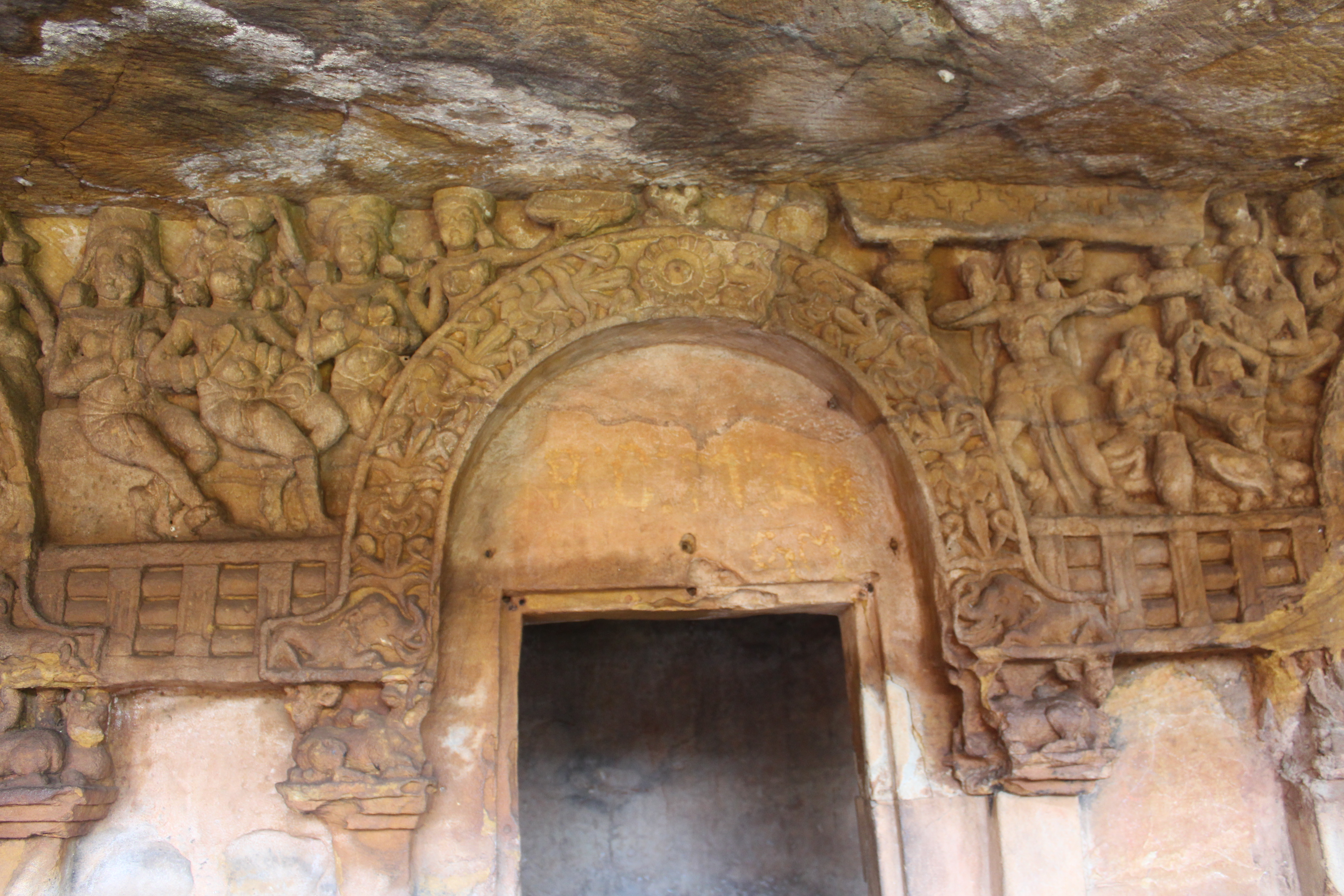
Left aisle relief

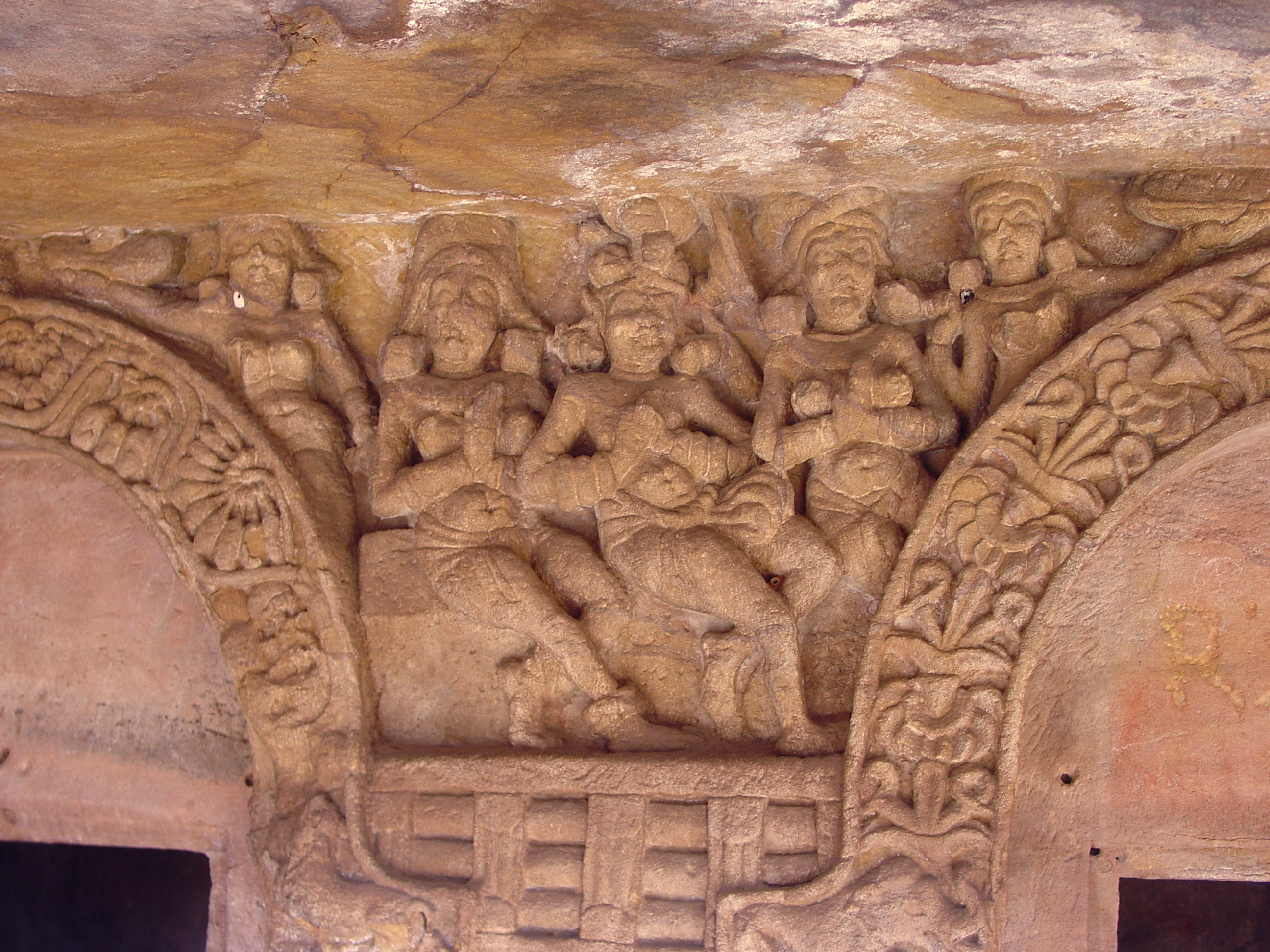
Left aisle relief (detail)

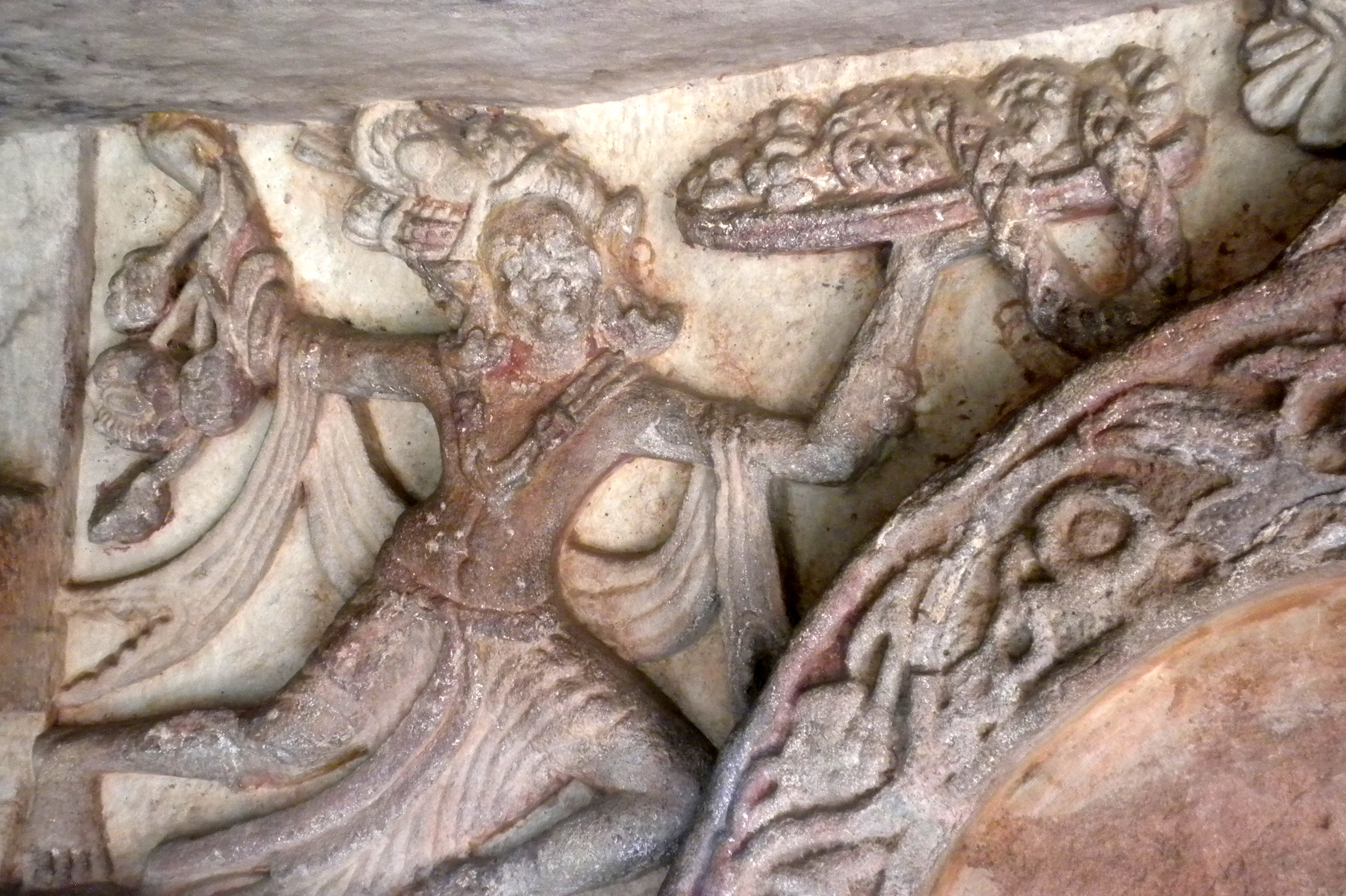
Apsara making an offering

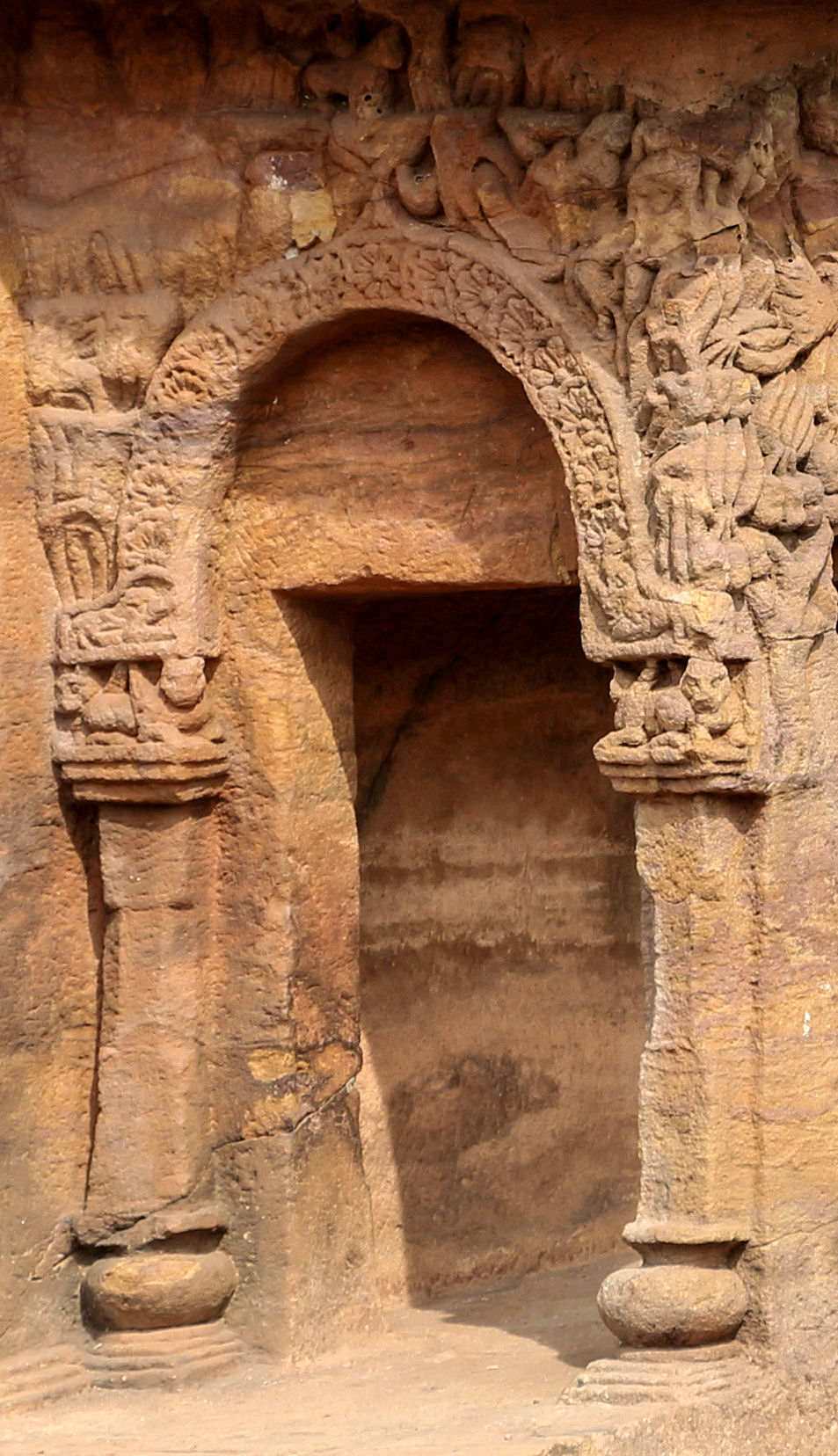
Doorway arrangement

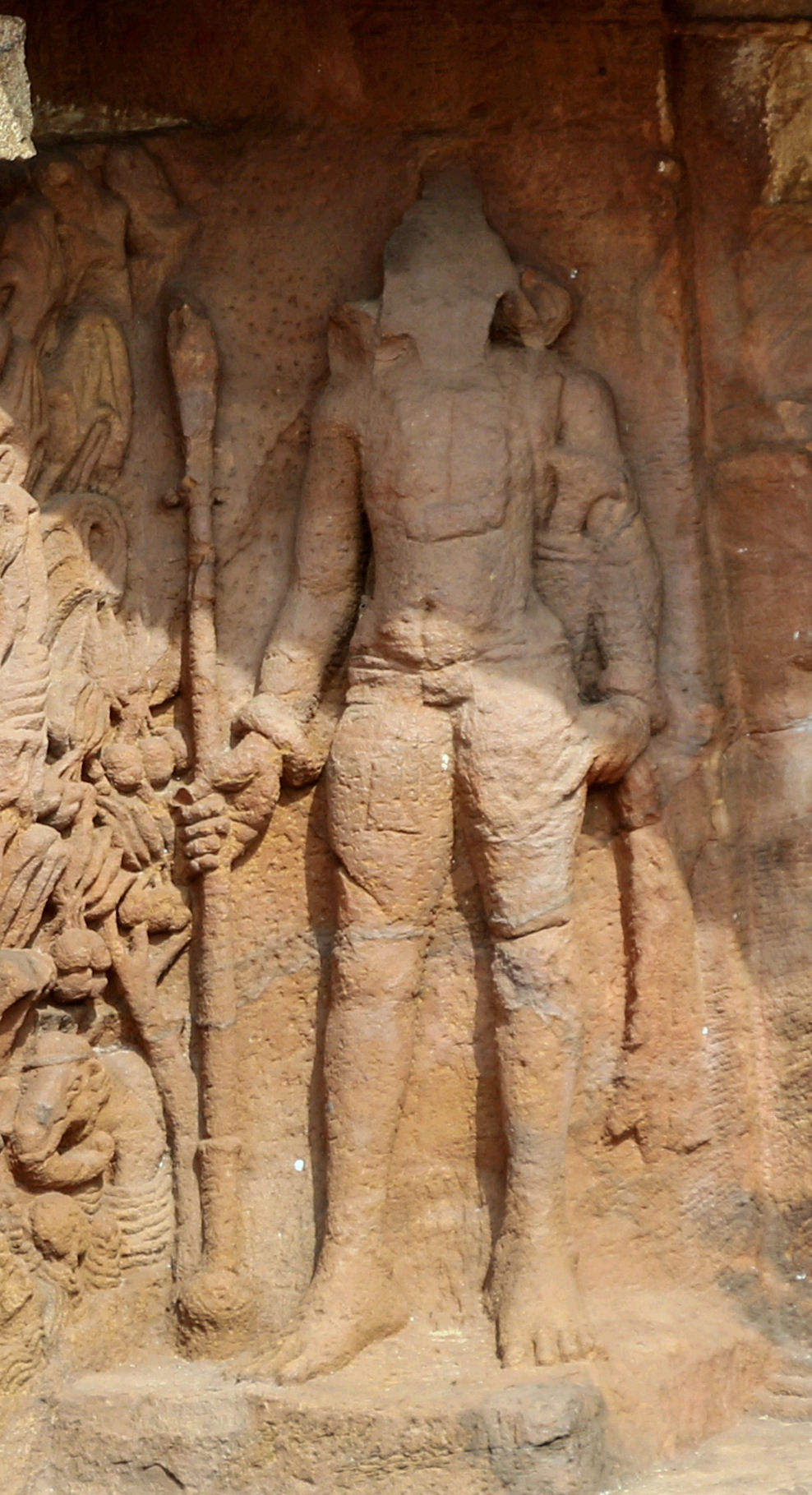
Indian warrior detail

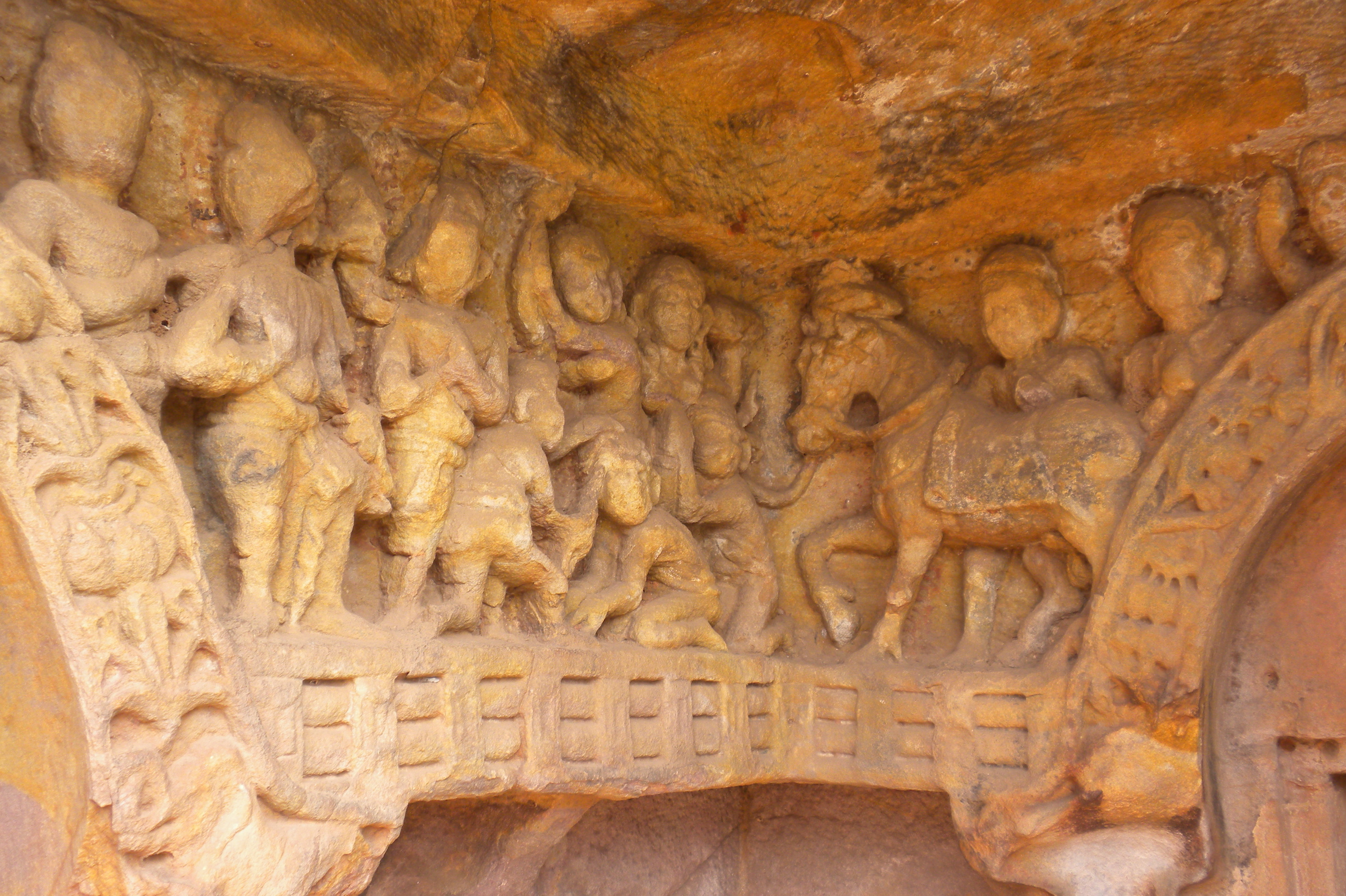
Right corner relief

Second floor
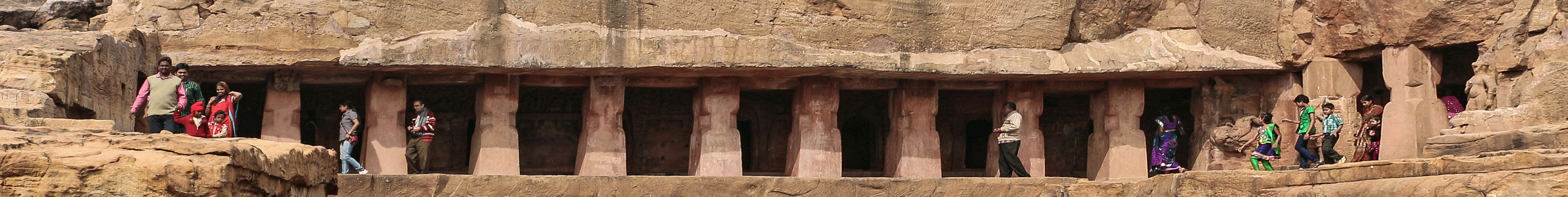
Panorama of the first floor

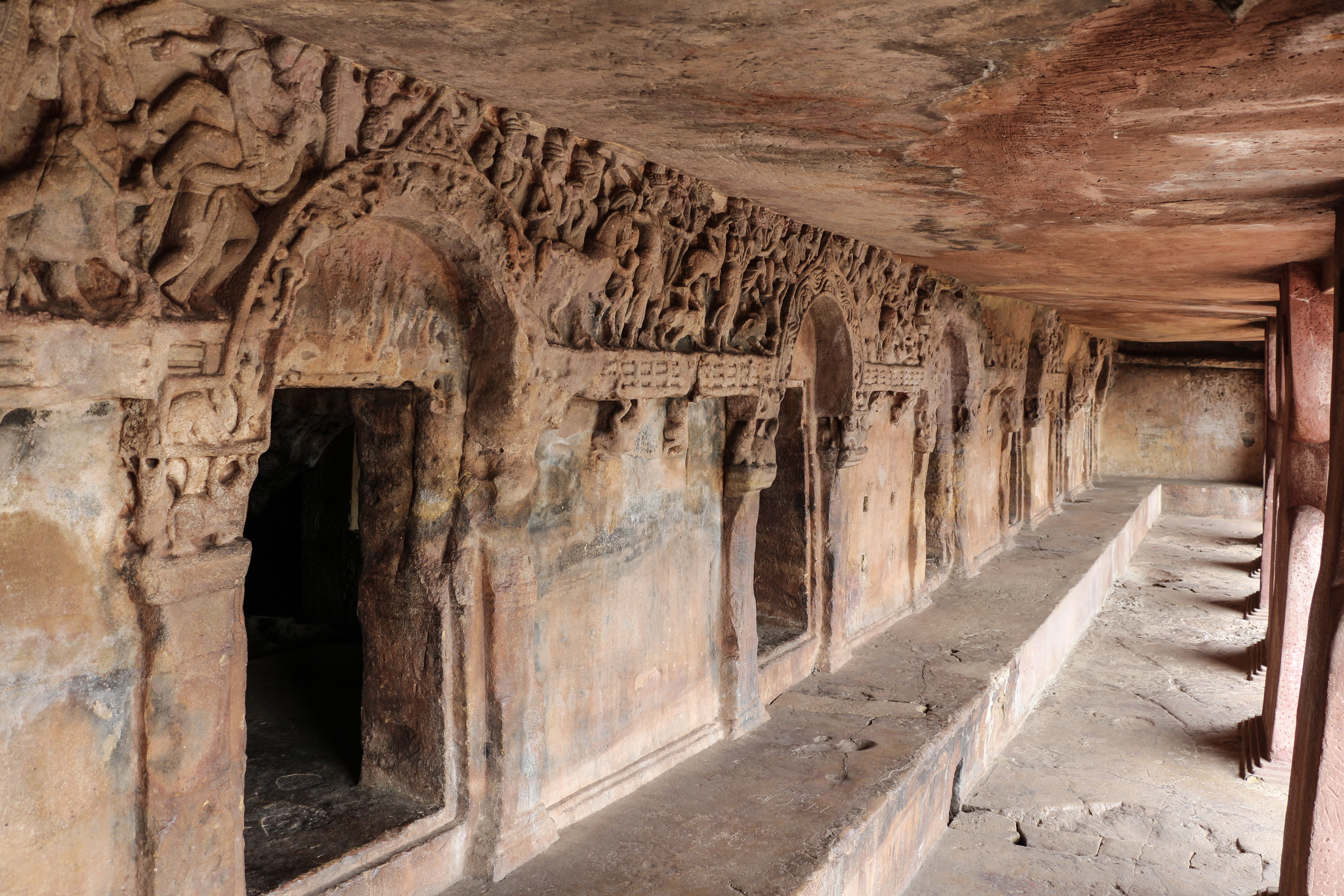
Corridor

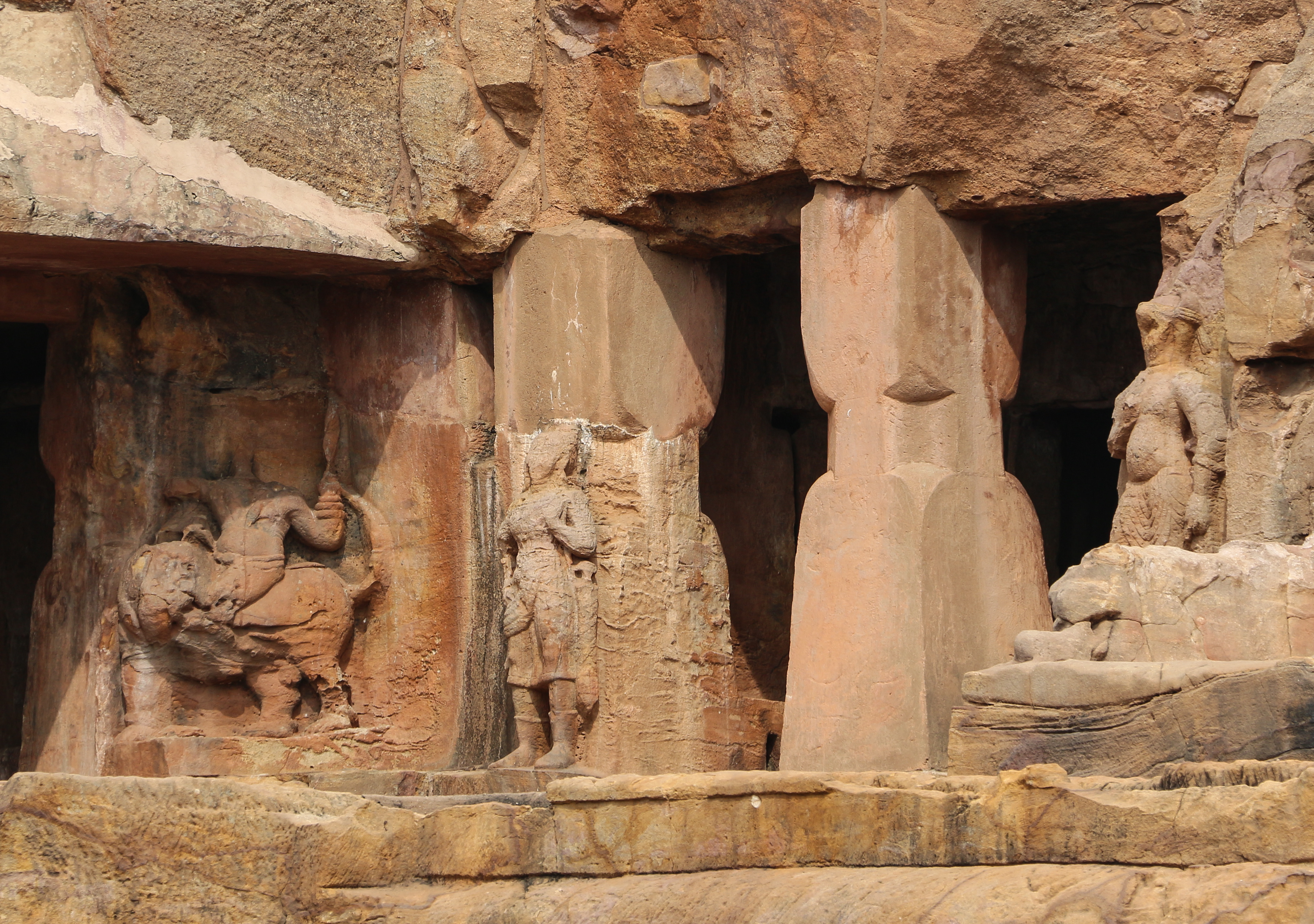
Right corner with Yavana warrior

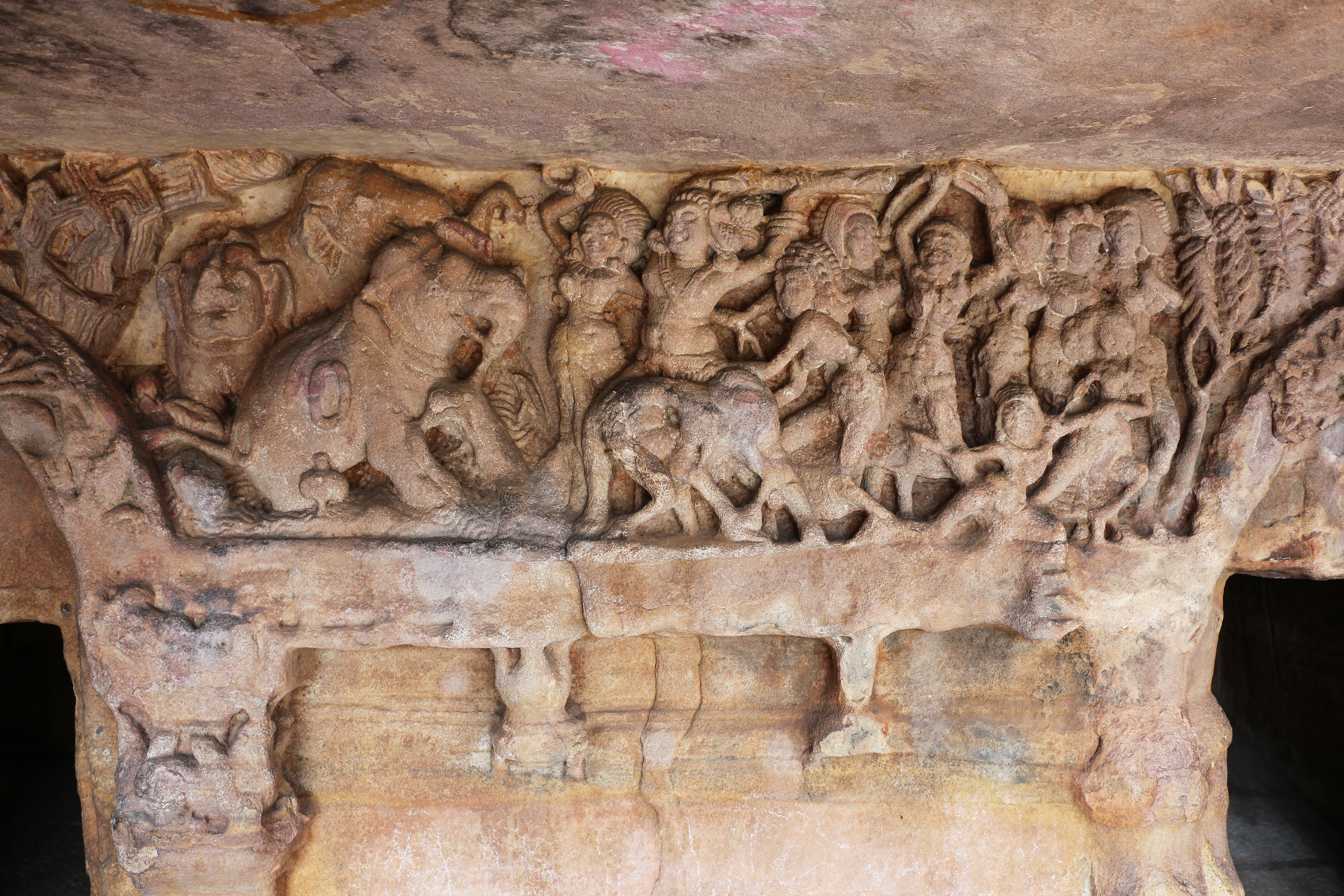
Pillar relief with elephants

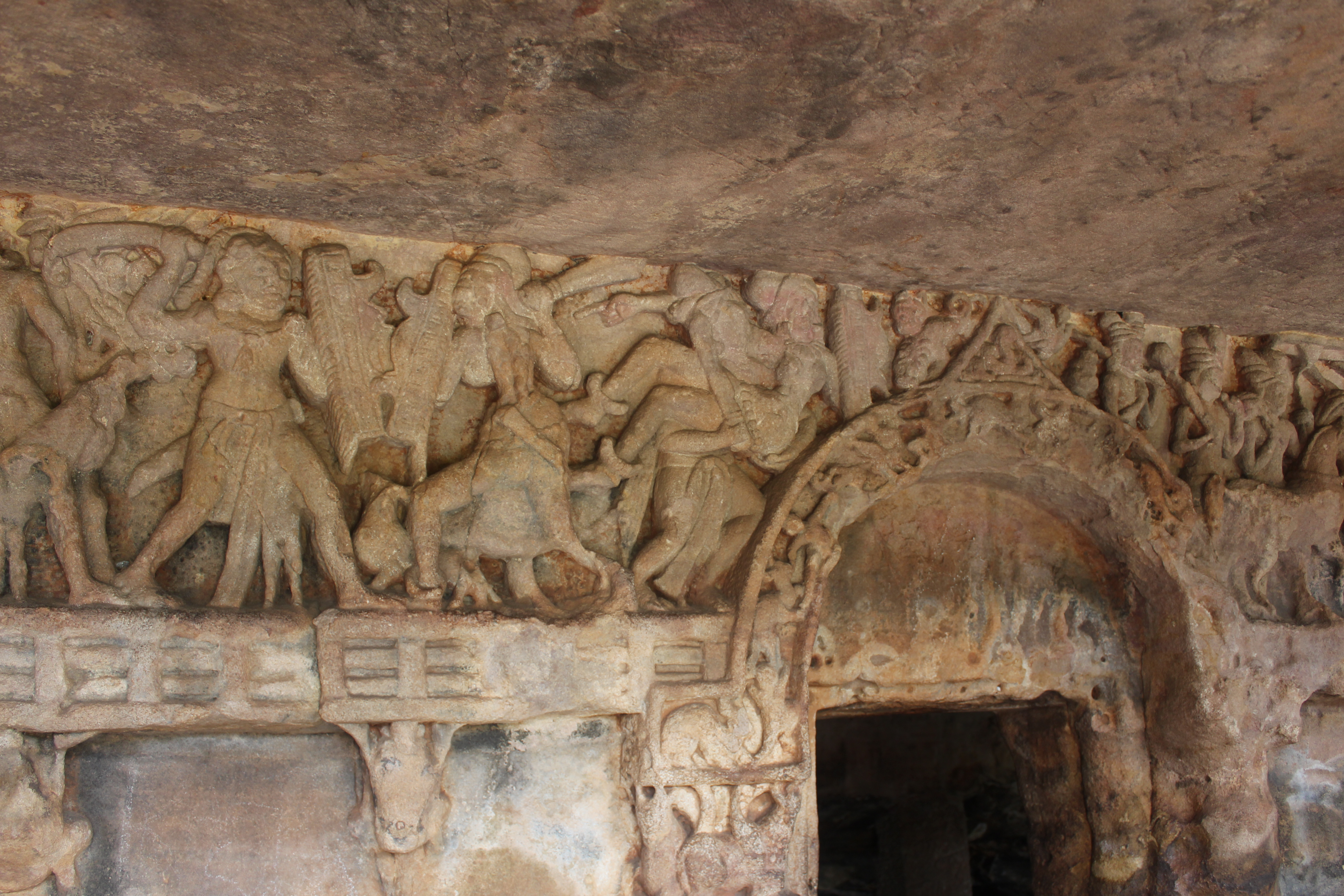
Pillar relief: battle scene

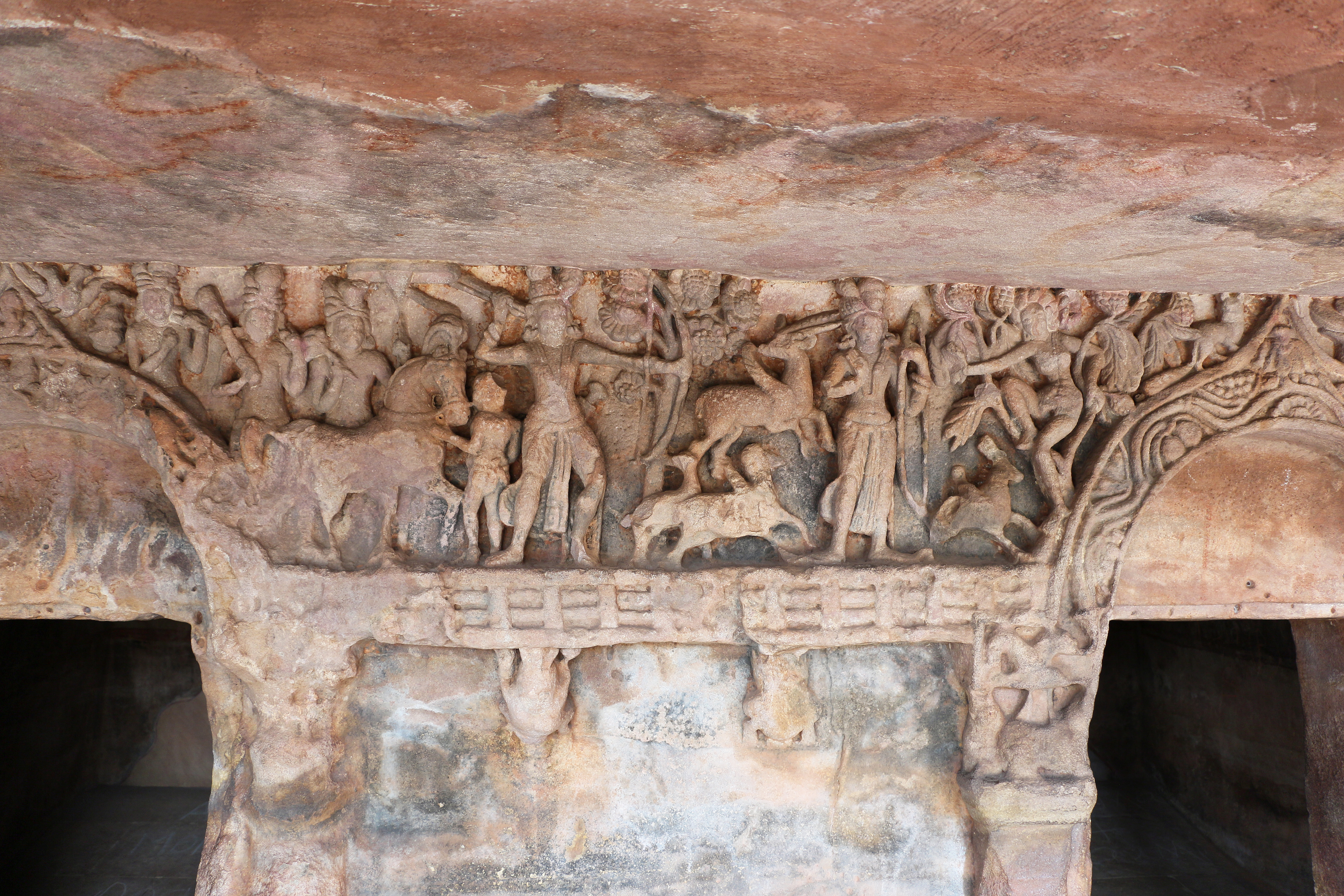
Pillar relief: hunting scene

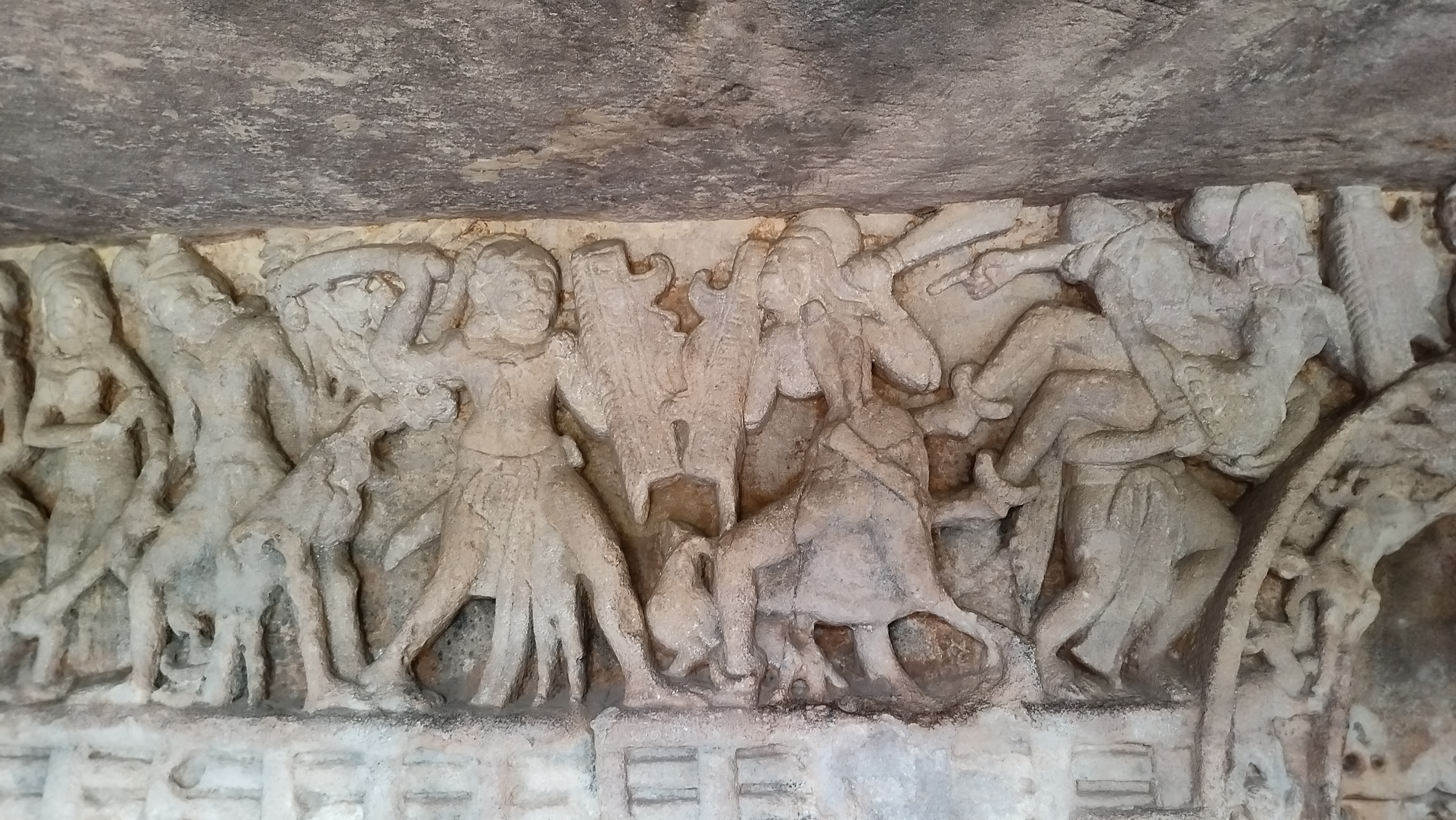
Pillar relief: war scene

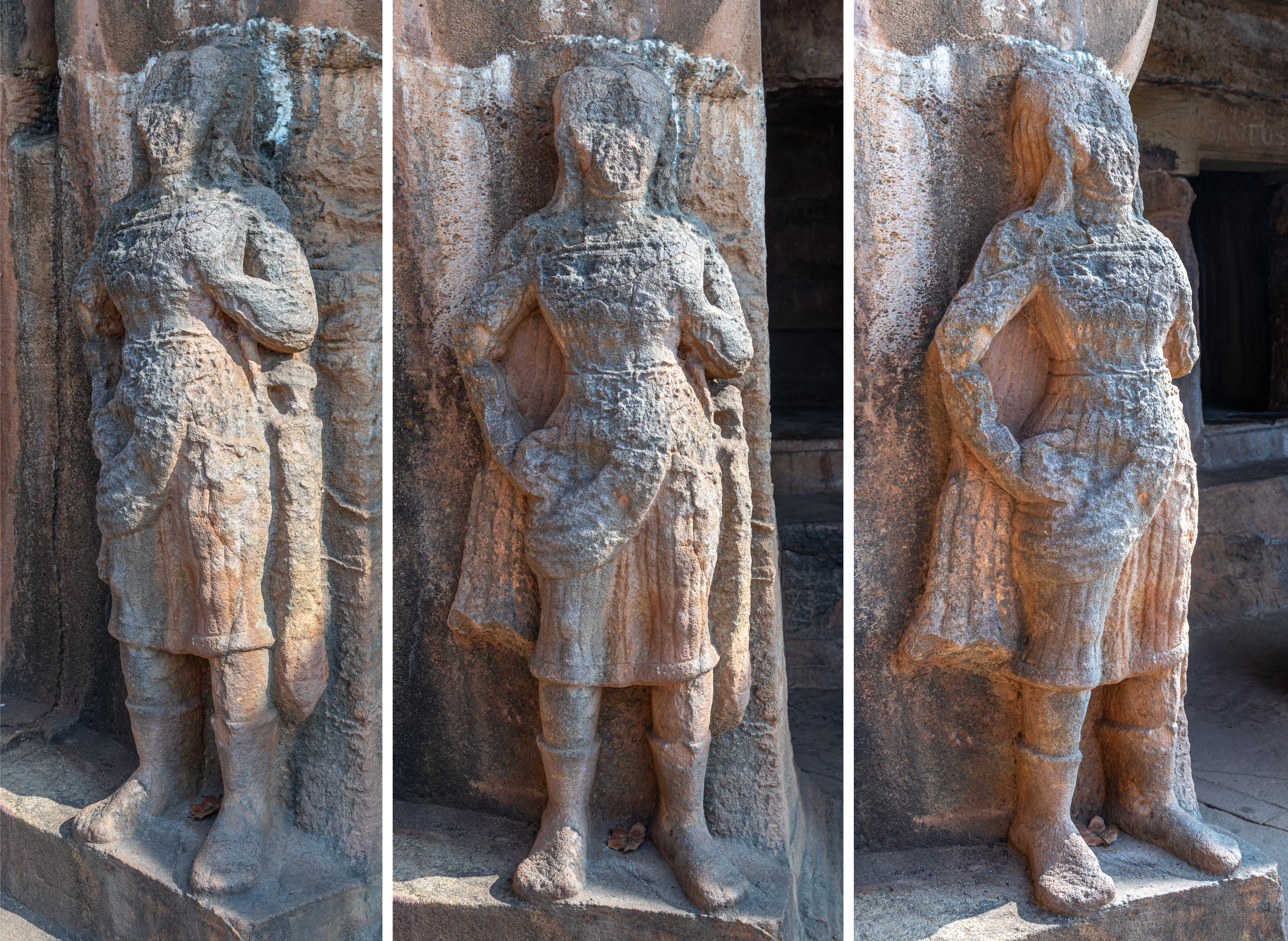
Yavana warrior.

2. Bajaghara Gumpha

Bajaghara Gumpha is very simple and small. It has a stone bed and pillow and it was used as the Jain monks' shelter in ancient times. Apart from the plain rectangular-shaped pillars, there is no other sculpture in this cave.

3. Chota Hathi Gumpha

Chota Hathi Gumpha is small in size. It has six small elephant figures in the facade and a statue of a guardian.

4. Alakapuri Gumpha

Alakapuri Gumpha has a relief sculpture of a lion holding its prey in its mouth. The cave has pillars with winged human figures (divine beings). It is double storeyed.

5. Jaya Vijaya Gumpha

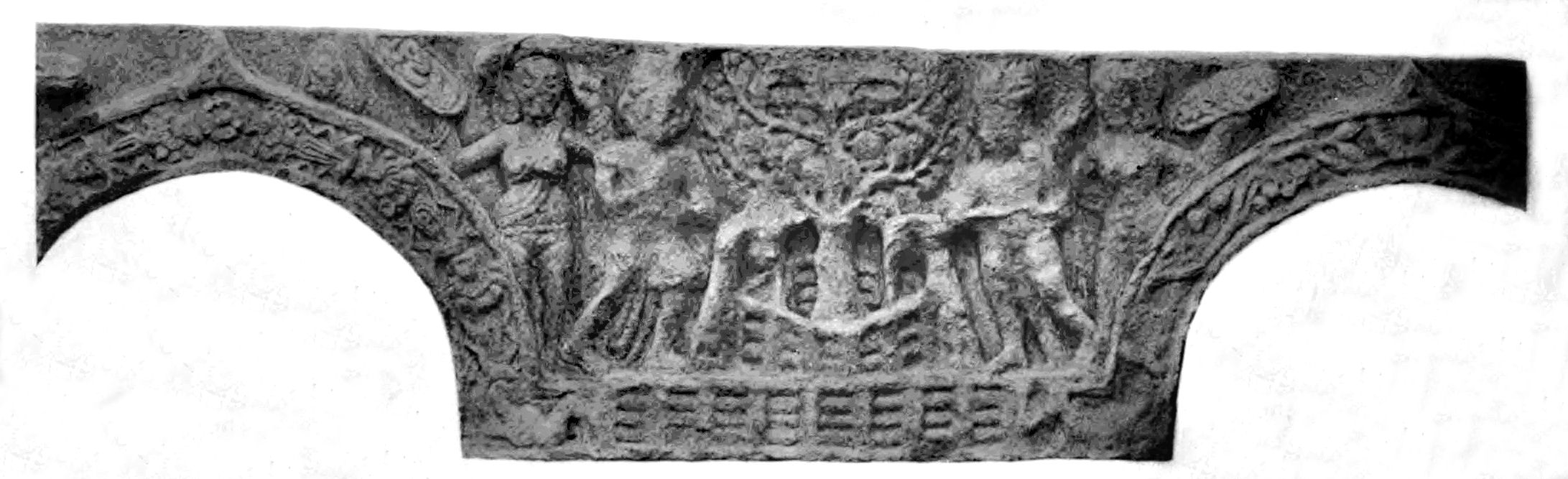
A tree-worship relief from the Jaya Vijaya cave.

Jaya Vijaya Gumpha is double storeyed. The cave has a carving of a female wearing heavy earrings, bands, beautifully decorated hair. On one hand of the carving is a parrot and the other is resting on her waist.

6. Panasa Gumpha

Panasa Gumpha is a very small and simple cave without any significant features.

7. Thakurani Gumpha

Thakurani Gumpha is double storeyed but is very simple in style. It has a few tiny relief sculptures.

8. Patalapuri Gumpha

Patalapuri Gumpha is slightly bigger with a pillared verandah.

9. Mancapuri and Swargapuri Gumpha

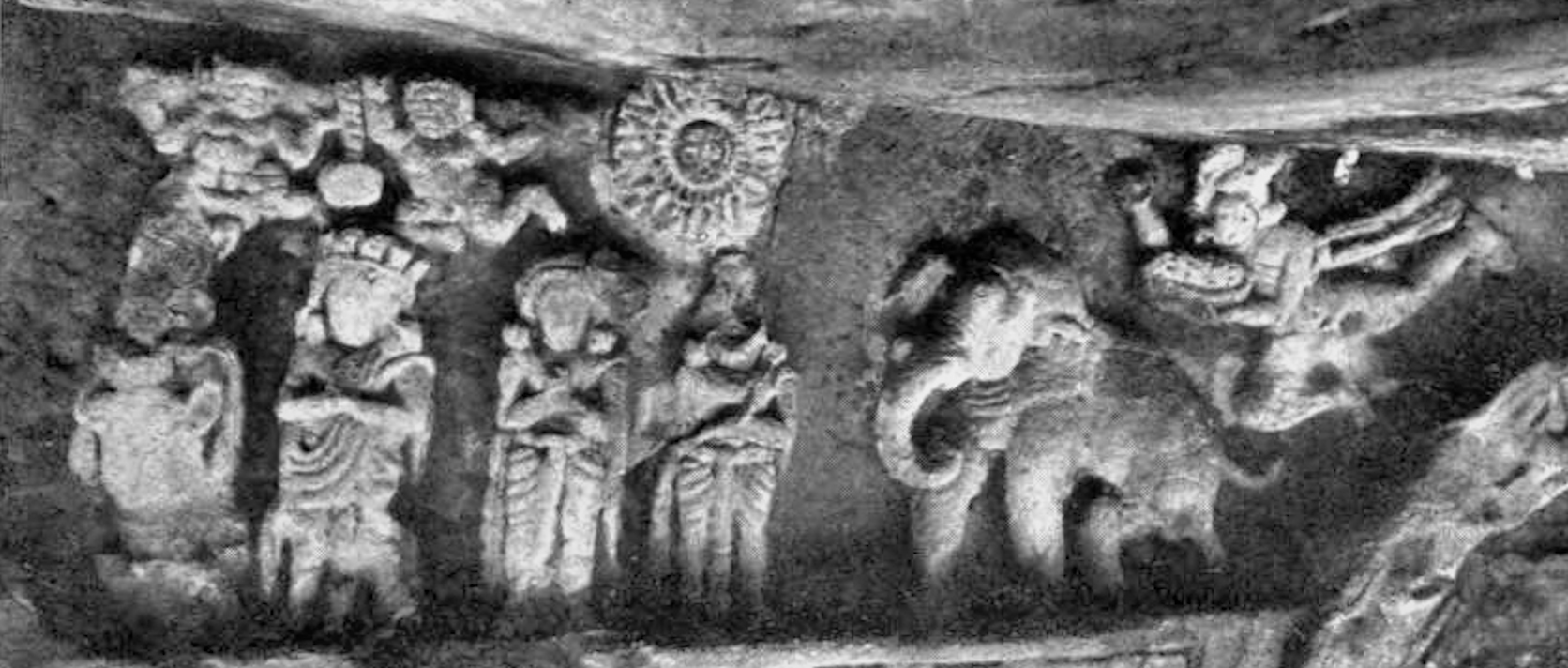
Manchapuri cave relief depicting the worship of Kalinga Jina

Mancapuri and Swargapuri Gumpha is double storeyed. Manchapuri cave depicts two male and two female figures worshipping the Kalinga Jina that Kharval brought back from Magadha. It has a damaged Jain religious symbol which was probably used for worship.

There are three inscriptions: one inscription talks about the chief queen of Kharavela, and the other two refer to Kudepasiri, the successor of Kharavela and Badukha, the son or brother of Kudepasiri.

10. Ganesha Gumpha

Ganesha Gumpha is one of the most important caves in Udayagiri. The cave is named for the carved figure of Ganesha on the back of its right cell. Of course, it would have been carved in the later period and it could not be the original work. The cave has two large statues of elephants carrying garlands at the entrance and is the first example of sculpture animals used as a guard to the entrance. Also, the carved figures of dwara palas are found at the entrances. The carvings in this cave narrate the story of the elopement of Bassavadatta, Princess of Ujjayini, with King Udayana of Kausambi in the company of Vasantaka.

Cave No.10 "Ganesha Gumpha" (Cave of Ganesha)
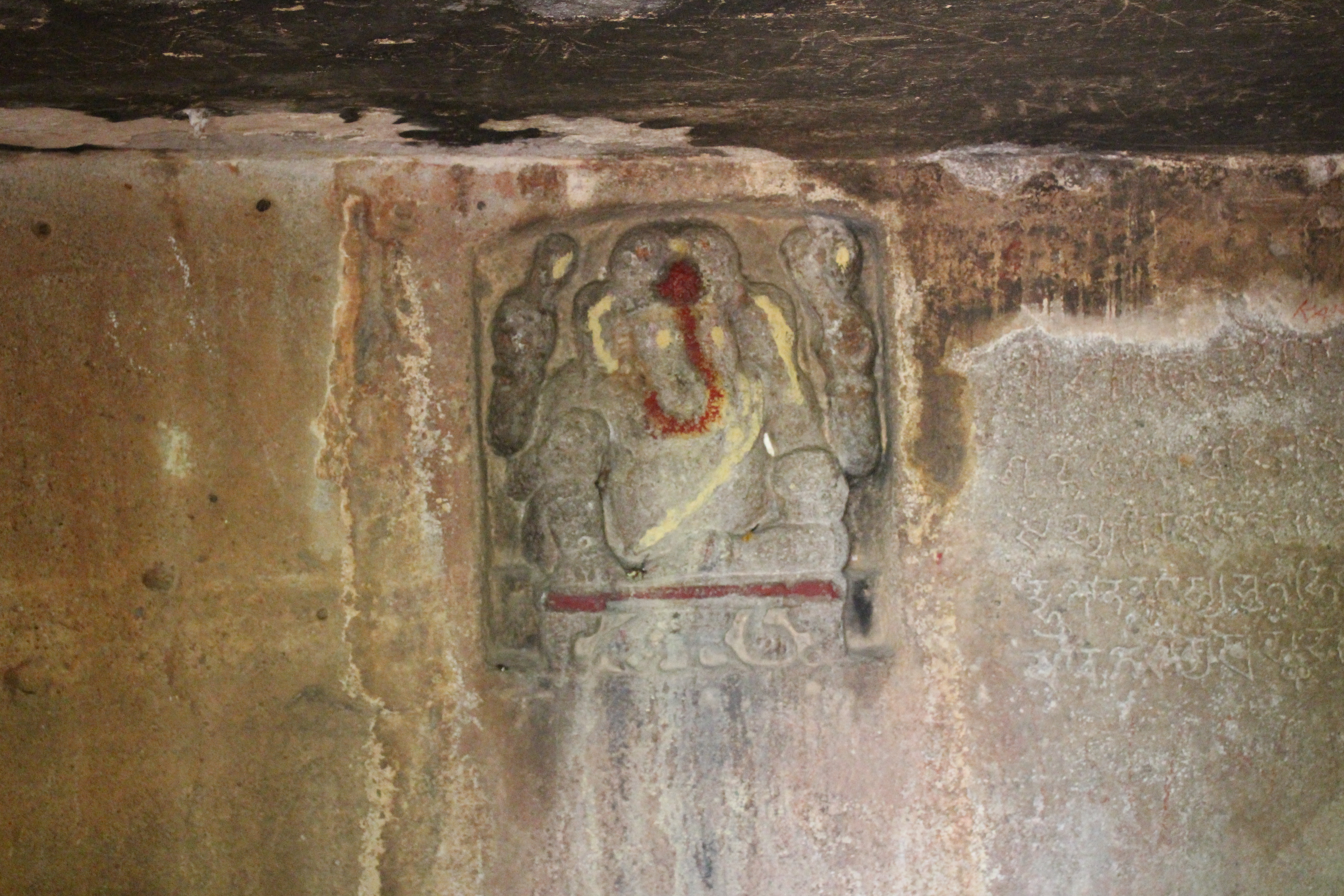
The Ganesha idol at the back of the cave

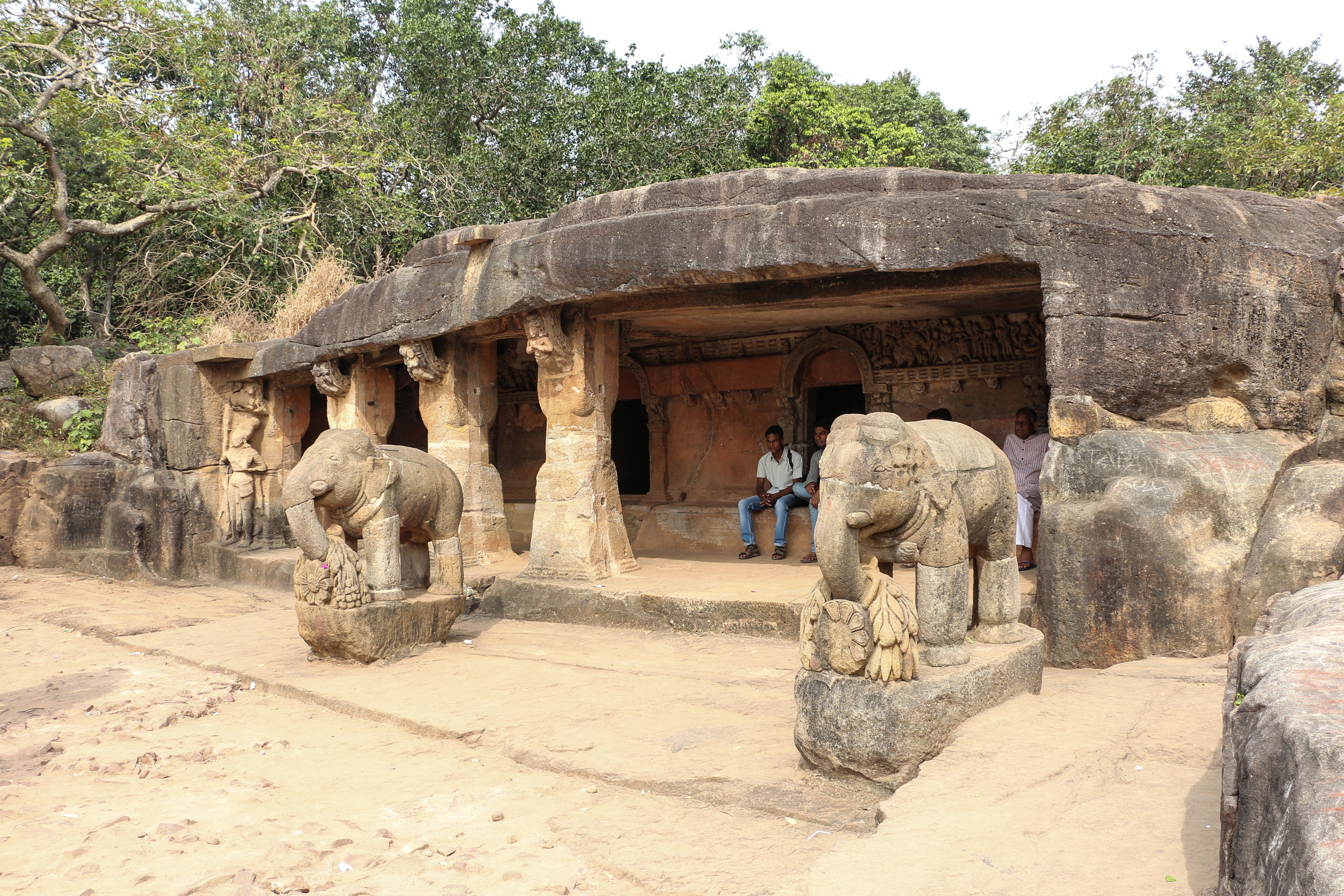
Ganesha cave

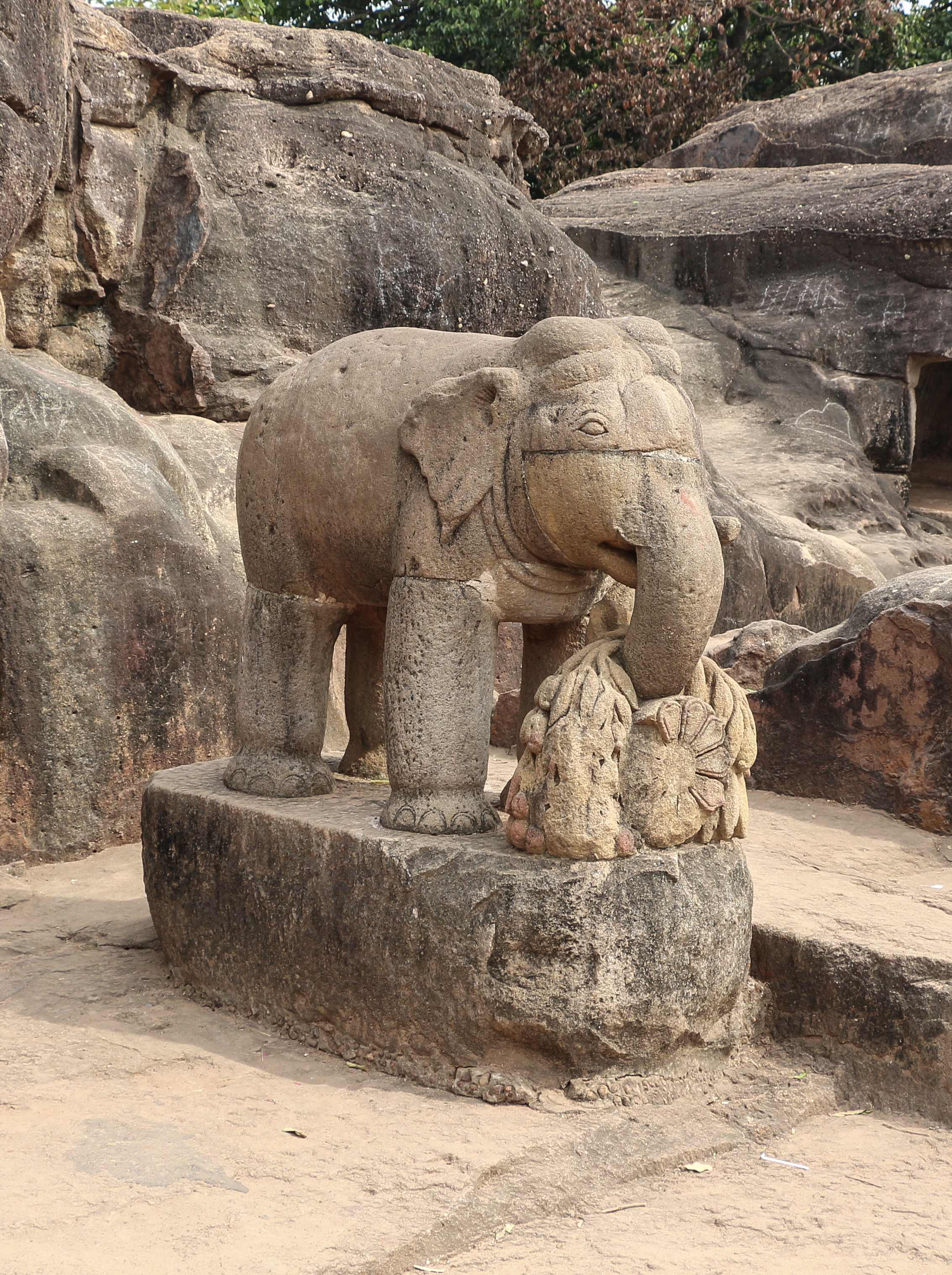
Elephant statue

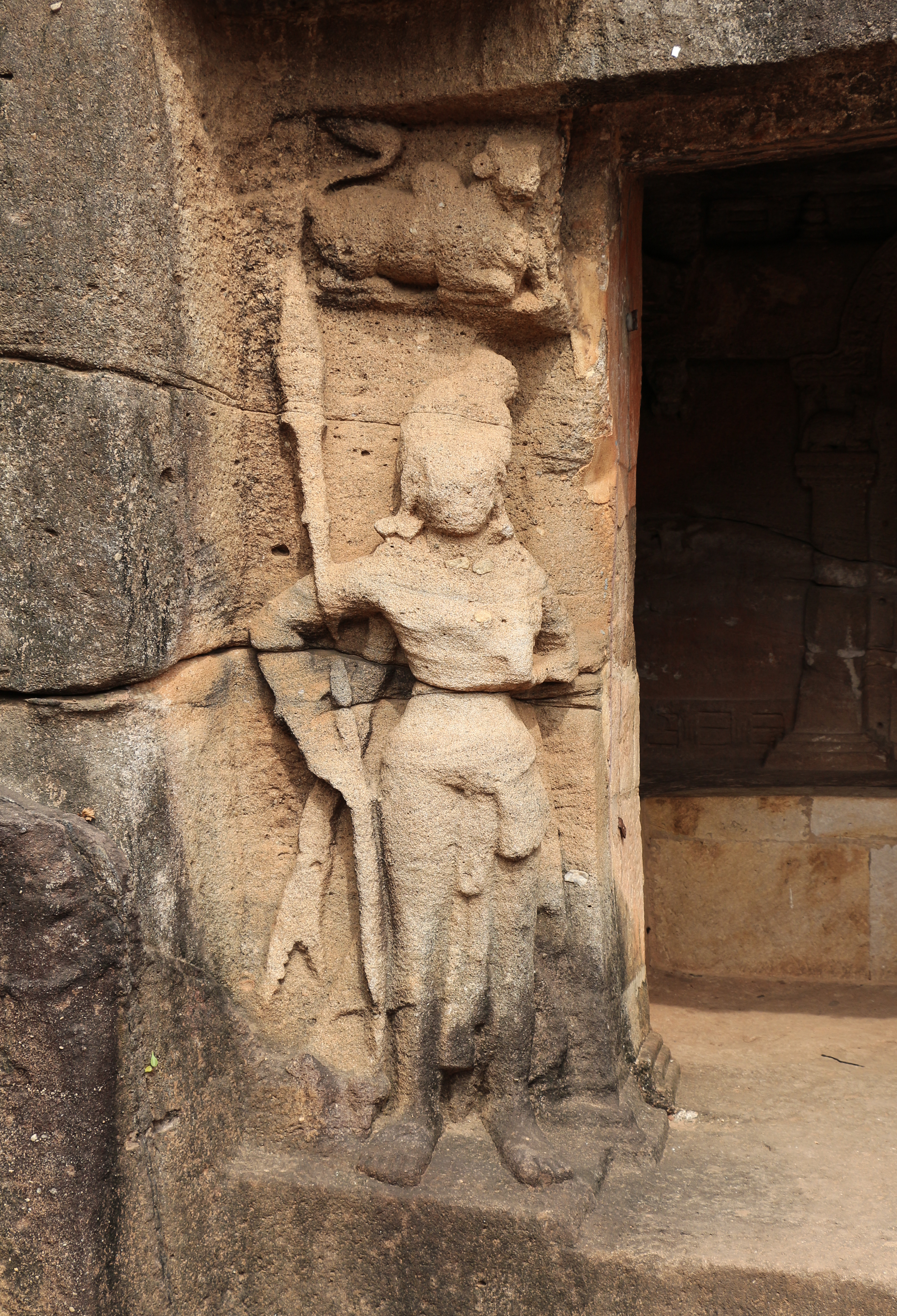
Warrior guardian

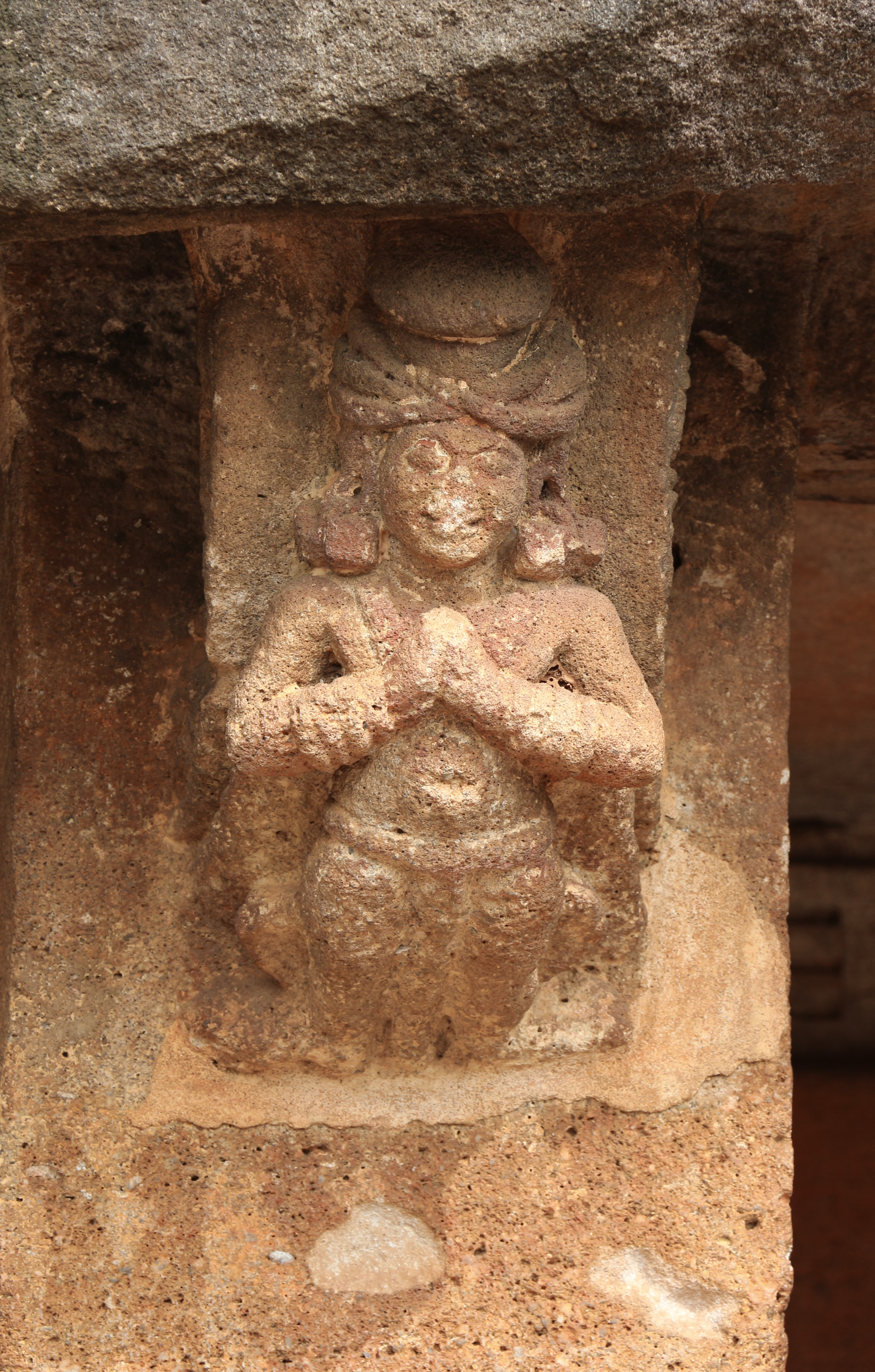
Relief of a devotee

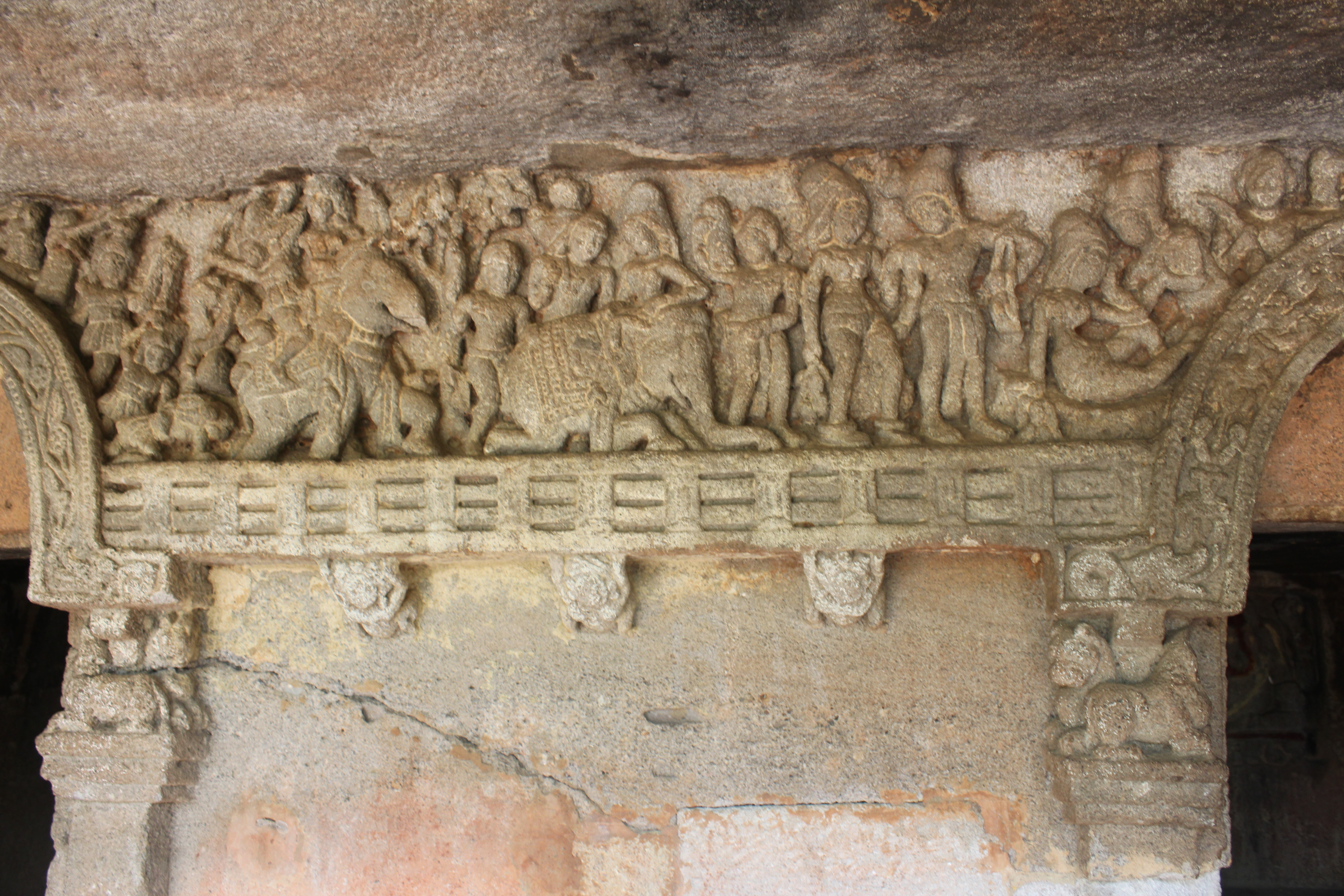
Relief in the veranda

11. Jambesvara Gumpha

Jambesvara Gumpha is a very simple and small cave with one column and two pilasters. The inscription tells that it is the cave of Nayaki, wife of Mahamade.

12. Vyaghra Gumpha

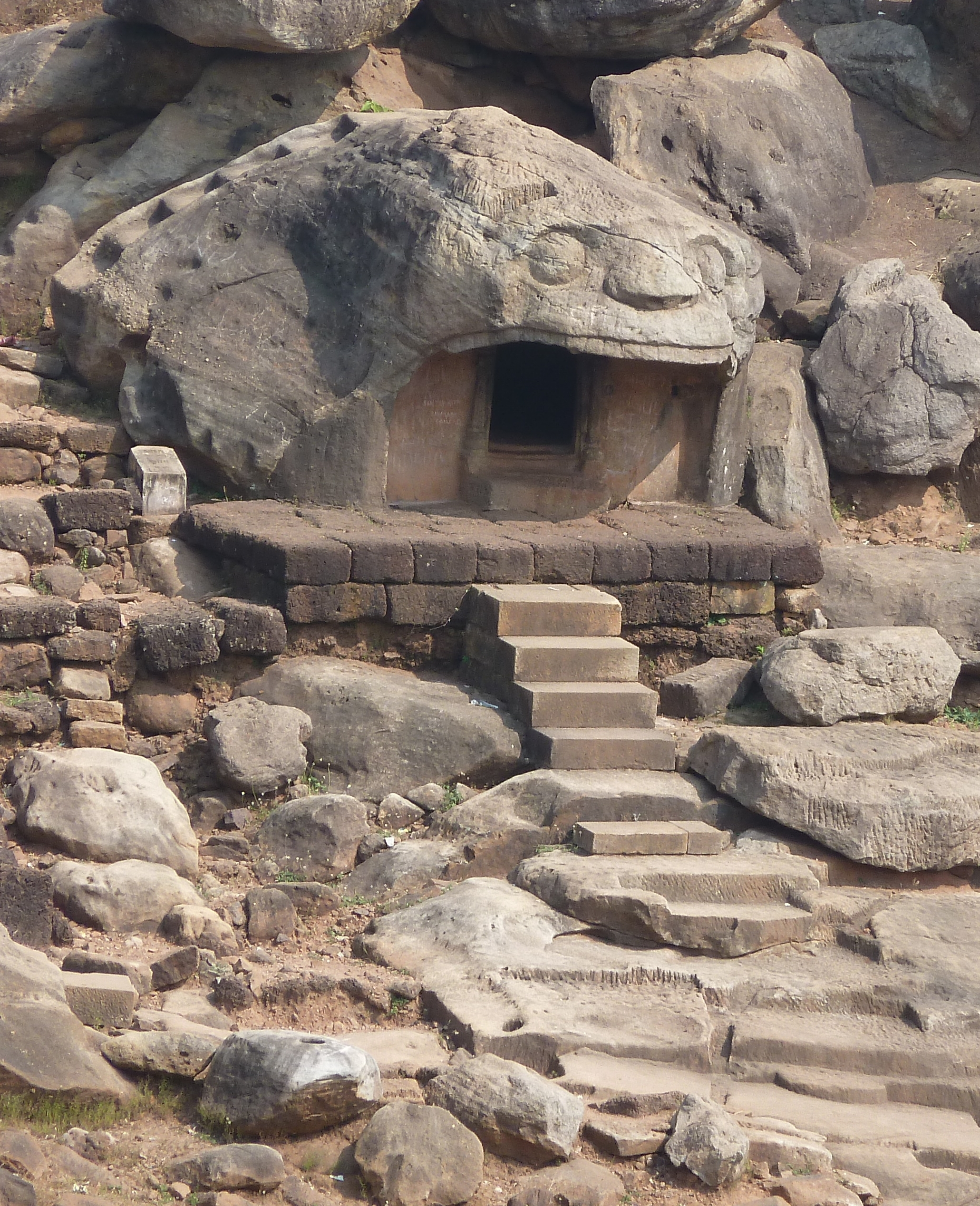
Tiger (Bagha/Byaghra Gumpha) (cave no-12), Udayagiri

Vyaghra Gumpha is one of the popular caves in Udayagiri. The cave, which is in ruins, has an entrance carved like a tiger's mouth, with the single-cell forming the tiger's throat. It is one of the most photographed sites in Udayagiri. The word vyaghra means "tiger". The inscription found here tells that this cave belongs to the city judge Sabhuti.

13. Sarpa Gumpha

Sarpa Gumpha is an unusually small cave containing two inscriptions. The word sarpa means "snake".

14. Hati Gumpha

Hati Gumpha is a large natural cavern with an inscription by Kharavela which is the main source of information about him. The cave is known as Hati Gumpha due to its exquisite carvings of elephant. The word hati means "elephant".

Cave No.14 "Hathi Gumpha" (Elephant Cave)
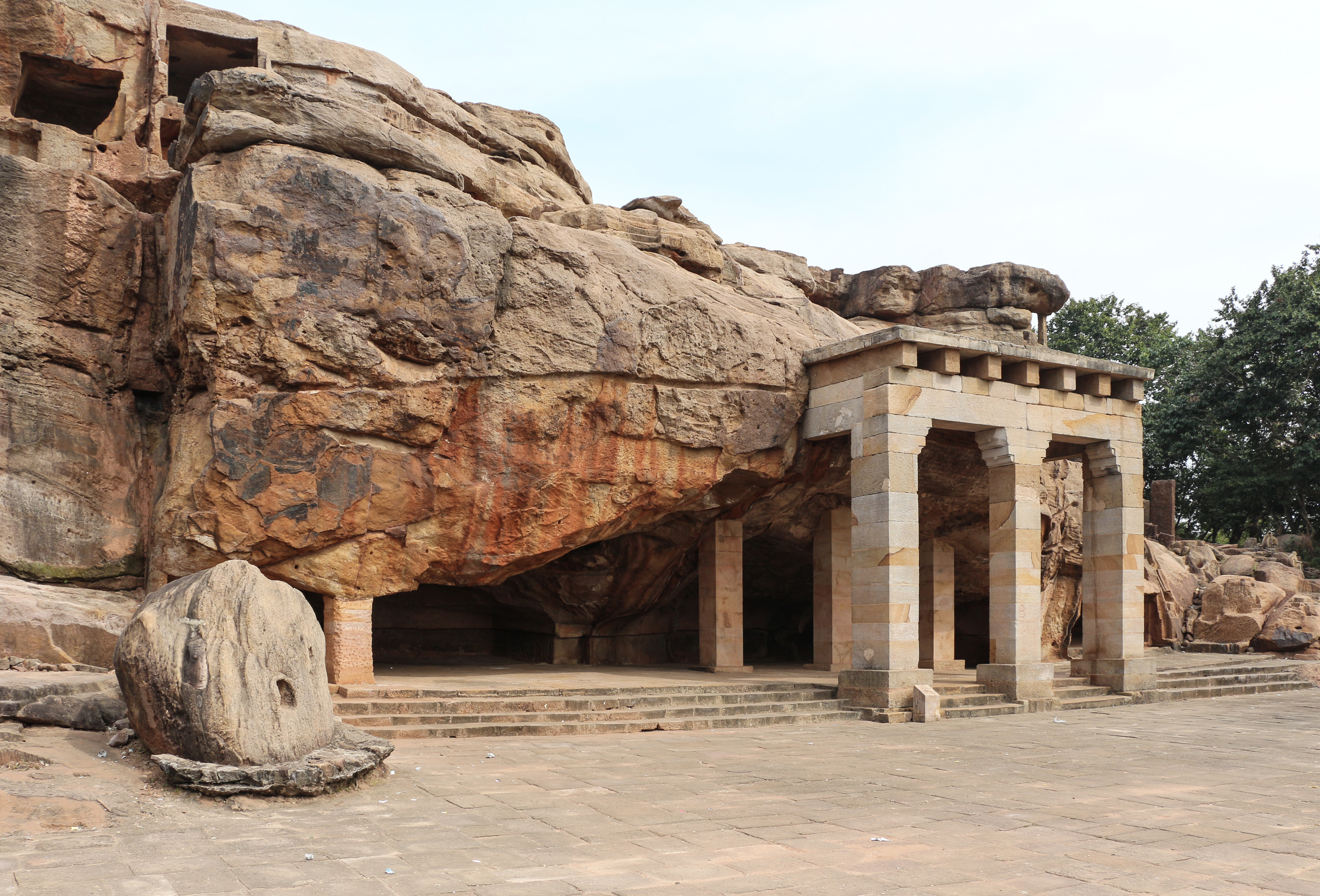
Hathi Gumpha (cave no-14), Udayagiri

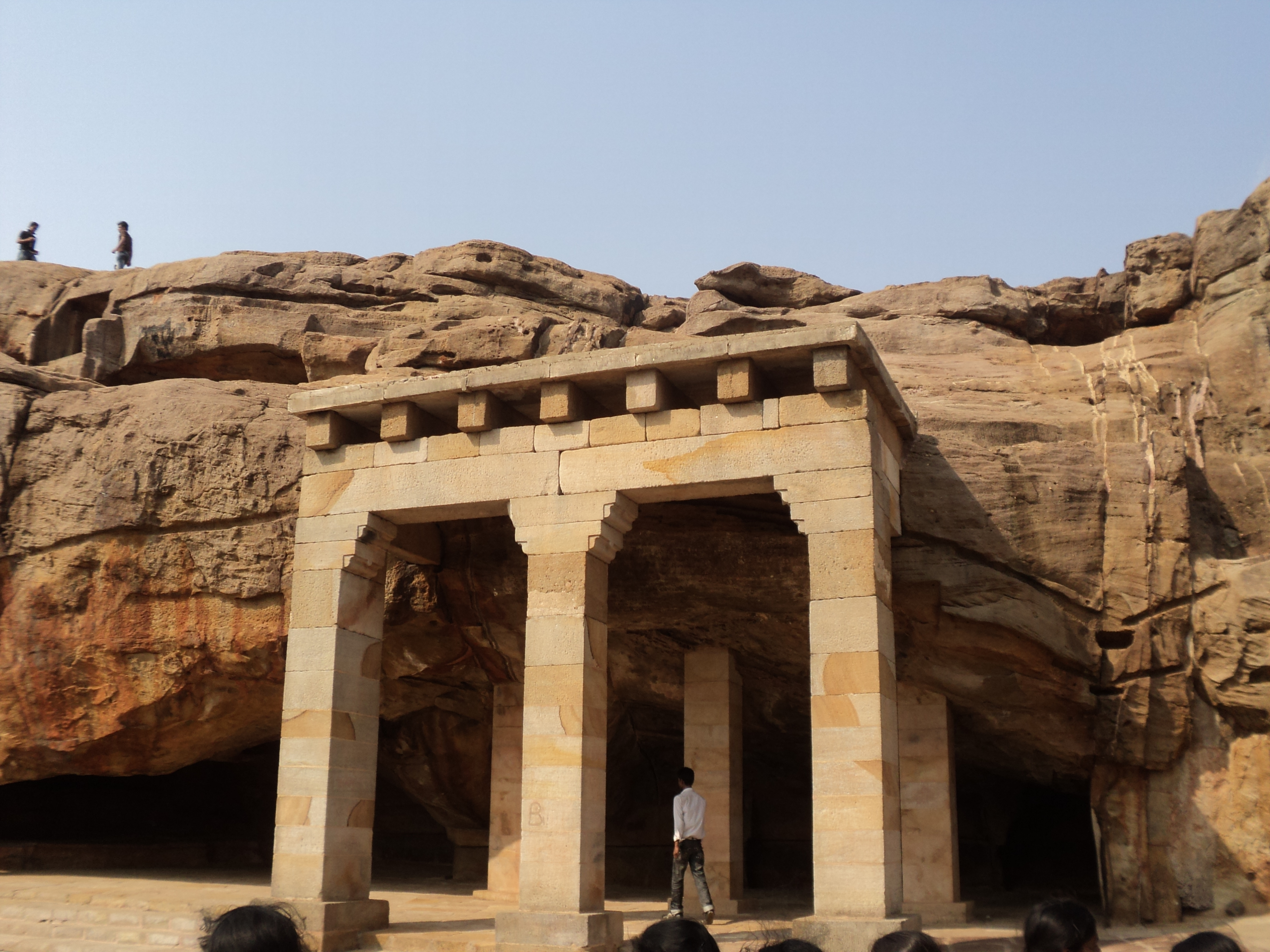
Hathi Gumpha

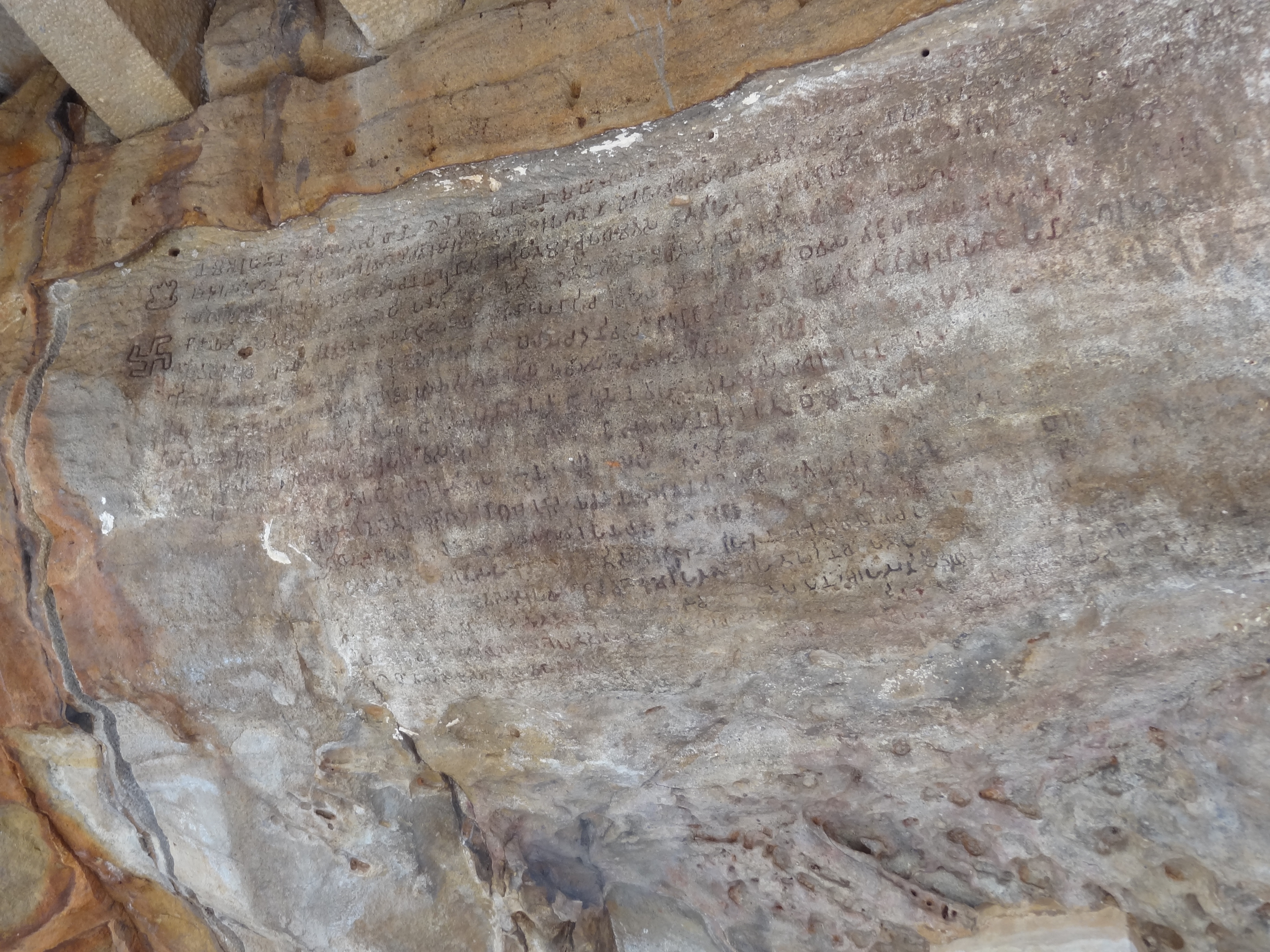
Hathigumpha inscription

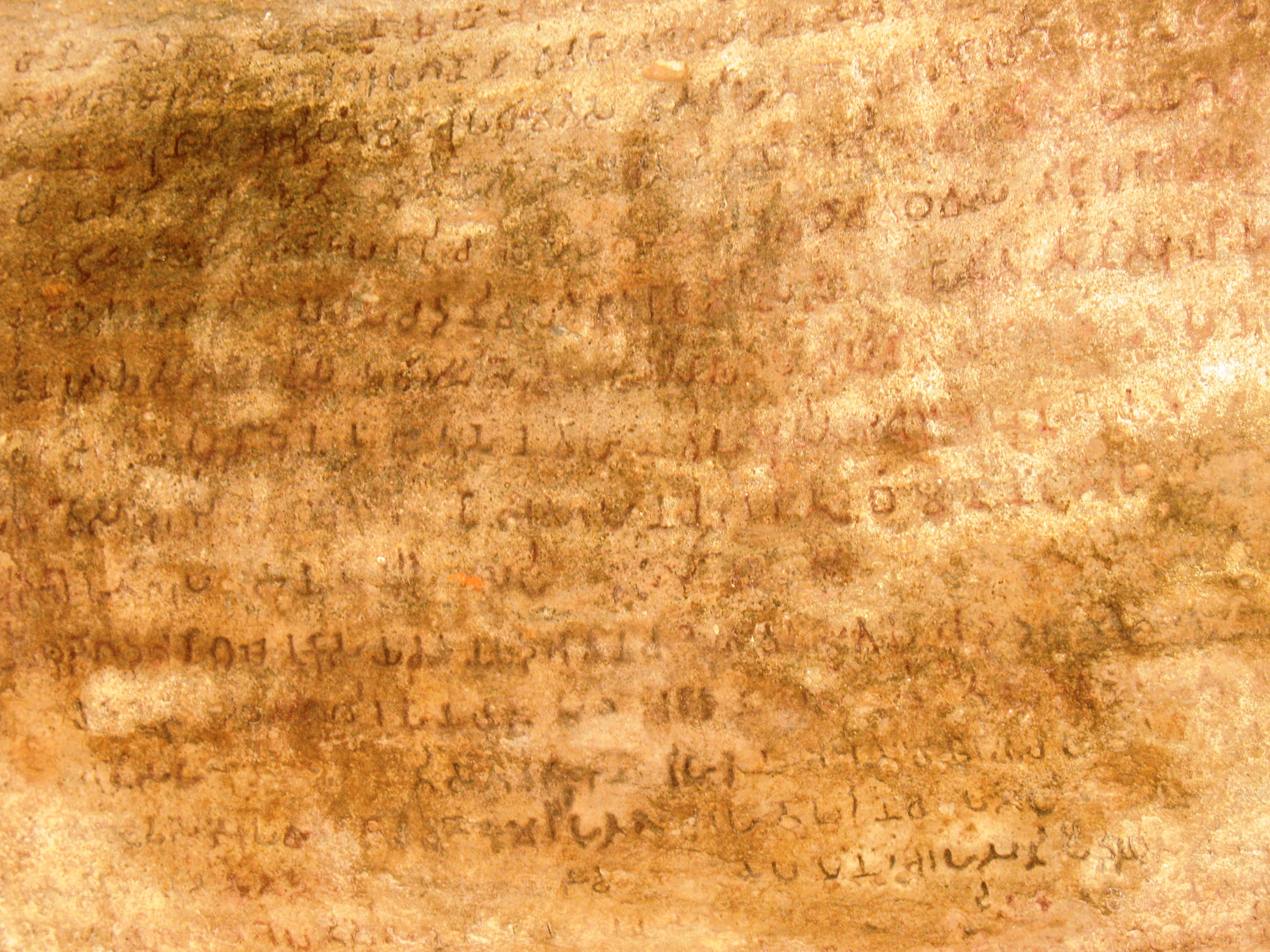
Detail of Hathigumpha inscription

15. Dhanaghara Gumpha

Dhanaghara Gumpha is a small cave that has two wide pillars and dwara pala sculptures carved at the entrance.

16. Haridasa Gumpha

Haridasa Gumpha is a small cave with three entrances and a verandah on the front side. There is an inscription found here.

17. Jagannatha Gumpha

Jagannatha Gumpha is a roughly cut cave with three entrances.

18. Rasui Gumpha

Rasui Gumpha is an unusually very small cave.

== Inscriptions ==
=== Hathigumpha inscription ===
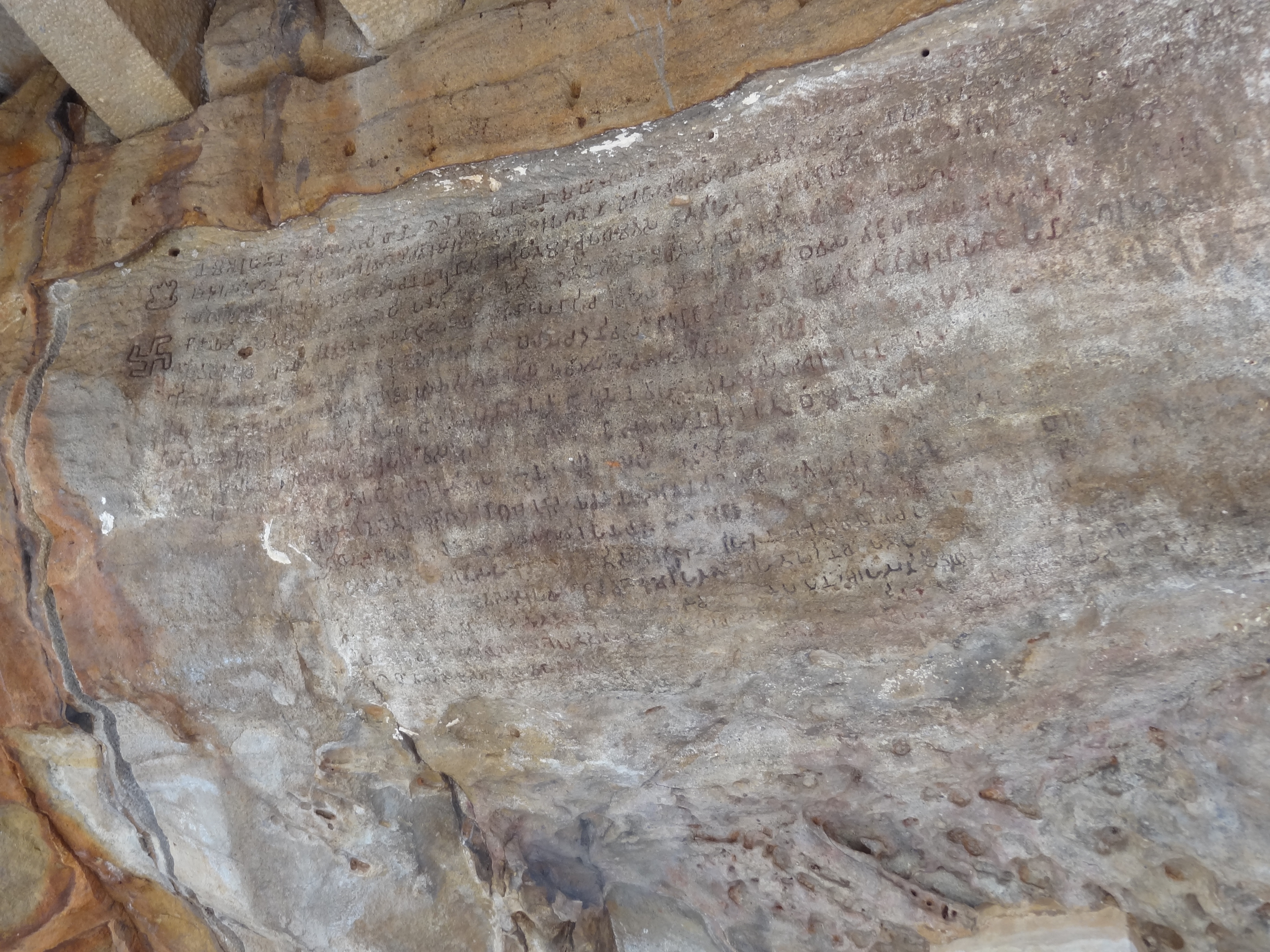
Hathigumpha inscription in Udaigiri

The Hathigumpha inscription starts with a version of the auspicious Jain Namokar Mantra venerating Arihant and Siddhas for in Jainism.

The Hathigumpha cave ("Elephant Cave") has the Hathigumpha inscription, written by Raja Kharavela, the king of Kalinga in India, during the 2nd century BCE. The Hathigumpha inscription consists of seventeen lines incised in deep cut Brahmi letters on the overhanging brow of a natural cavern Hathigumpha in the south side of the Udayagiri hill. The inscription also refers to the Kharaval's feat of bringing back the status of Agra-Jina (transl. Rishabhanatha) which was taken by Nanda Empire. It faces the rock edicts of Asoka at Dhauli, situated about six miles away.

=== Other minor inscriptions ===
Besides Hathigumpha Inscription of Kharavela, there are some other minor Brahmi inscriptions in the twin hillocks of Udayagiri and Khandagiri, which were deciphered earlier by Prof RD Banergy during 1915–16 (Epigraphic Indica-XIII) and BM Baraua (Indian Historical Quarterly-XIV). Sadananda Agrawal has given further clarifications about them and is produced as under:

I- Mancapuri cave inscription (Upper storey) This inscription refers to the construction of temple of arhats and excavation of cave for Jain monks by Aga-mahisi, chief queen of Kharavela. The inscription also mention Kharavela as chakravatin of Kalinga.

II- Mancapuri cave inscription (Upper storey)-A This inscription is incised on a raised bend between the 3rd and 4th doorways from the left and contains a single line. The text in Devanagari script is as under:

ऐरस महाराजस कलिंगाधिपतिना महामेघवाहनस कुदेपसिरिनो लेणं

Translation – This is the cave of Aira Mahameghavahana Maharaja Kudepasiri, the overlord of Kalinga.

Note:- Kudepasiri seems to be the immediate successor of Kharavela.

III-Manchapuri cave inscription (Lower storey)-B This inscription has been engraved on the right wall of Veranda, to the right of the entrance to the right-hand side chamber of the main wing, consisting of one line. The text in Devanagari script is as under:

कुमारो वडुखस लेणं

Translation – [This is] the cave of Prince Vaḍukha.

Note:- On palaeographic ground Prof Banergy considers this inscription to be a little earlier than the inscription of King Kudepasiri. According to Sadananda Agrawal, Prince Badukha stands as an obscure figure in history, but Badukha seems to be the son or brother of Kudepasiri.

IV- Inscriptions in the Sarpagumpha (Over the doorway)

This inscription consisting of one line is incised over the doorway of the Sarpagumpha. The text in Devanagari script is as under:

चूलकमस कोठाजेया च

Translation – The chamber and veranda/or side chamber of cūlakama. Note:- However Dr. Sahu interpreted Ajeya as being united by a Sandhi qualifying Koṭha thereby denoting invincible. But he ignored the conjunction ca (Devanagari: च) which follows Koṭha(Devanagari:कोठा) and Jeya (Devanagari:जेया).

V- Inscription in the Sarpagumpha ( to the left of the doorway) The text in Devanagari script is as under:

L.1- कंमस हलखि

L.2- णय च पसादो

Translation: [The pavilion is the] gift of Kamma and Halakhina.

Note:- Most probably Halakhiṇa was the wife of Kamma. Chūlakamma – found in the inscription No.IV and Kamma of this record indicates official designations rather than the proper names. Kamma may be taken as minister of works (Karma saciva) and Cūlakamma appears to be a junior cadre of a minister in the Department of works.

VI- Haridas cave inscription

This inscription contains one line that has been incised over one of the three entrances to the main chamber of the cave from the veranda. The text in Devanagari script is as under:

चूलकमस पसातो कोठाजेया च

Translation: The chamber and veranda (or side chamber) are the gifts of cūlakama.

VII- Vyāghragumphā inscription

The record is incised on the outer wall of the inner chamber. The text in Devanagari script is as under:

L.1- नगर अखंदस

L.2- स भूतिनो लेणं

Translation: The cave of Bhūti, the city judge.

VIII- Jambesavara cave inscription

This inscription has been engraved over the entrances to the inner chamber of the cave. The text in Devanagari script is as under:

महामदास बारियाय नाकियस लेणं

Translation: The cave of Mahāmāda Nākiya and Bāriyā.

X- Tatowāgumphā inscription (Cave No −1)

The record of this inscription is incised over one of the entrances to the inner chamber. The Text reads in Sanskrit as

पादमुलिकस कुसुमस लेणं x [॥]

Translation: The cave of Kusuma, the padamulika.

Notes:- There is a syllable after the word lenam, which may be read as ni or phi, padamulika literally means, one who serves at the feet [of king].

Note:- Sadananda Agrawal has interpreted Masikanagara as Asikanagara and identified with the city Adam (Nagpur district). In view of the evidence of a highly prosperous city unearthed at Adam, Prof AM Shastri is of the opinion that Adam itself represents the Asikanagara of Hathigumpha inscription. It is worth noting in the present context that a terracotta sealing having a legend, has been discovered from Adam, situated on the right bank of the river Wainganga, which reads Asakajanapadasa (Devanagari: असकजनपदस).

XI- Ananta Gumpha inscription (A)

The record is incised on the architrave between the left ante and the fifth pillar. The text in Oriya script is: Odia: ଦୋହଦ ସମଣନ ଲେଖ (Devanagari: दोहद समणनं लेणं

Translation: The cave of the Dohada Śramaṇas.

== Khandagiri caves ==
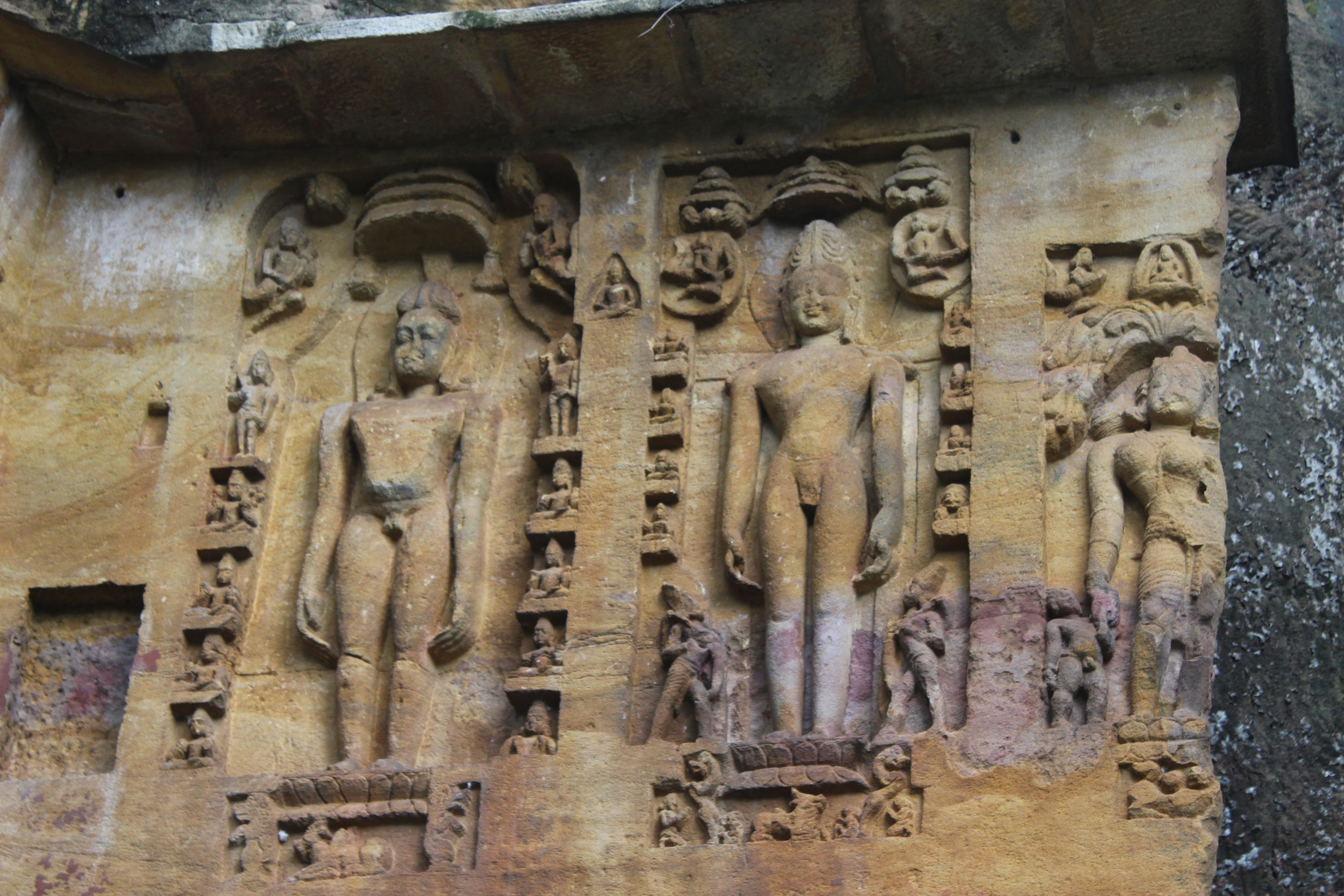
Carving of Rishabhanatha and Ambika, Ambika Gumpha

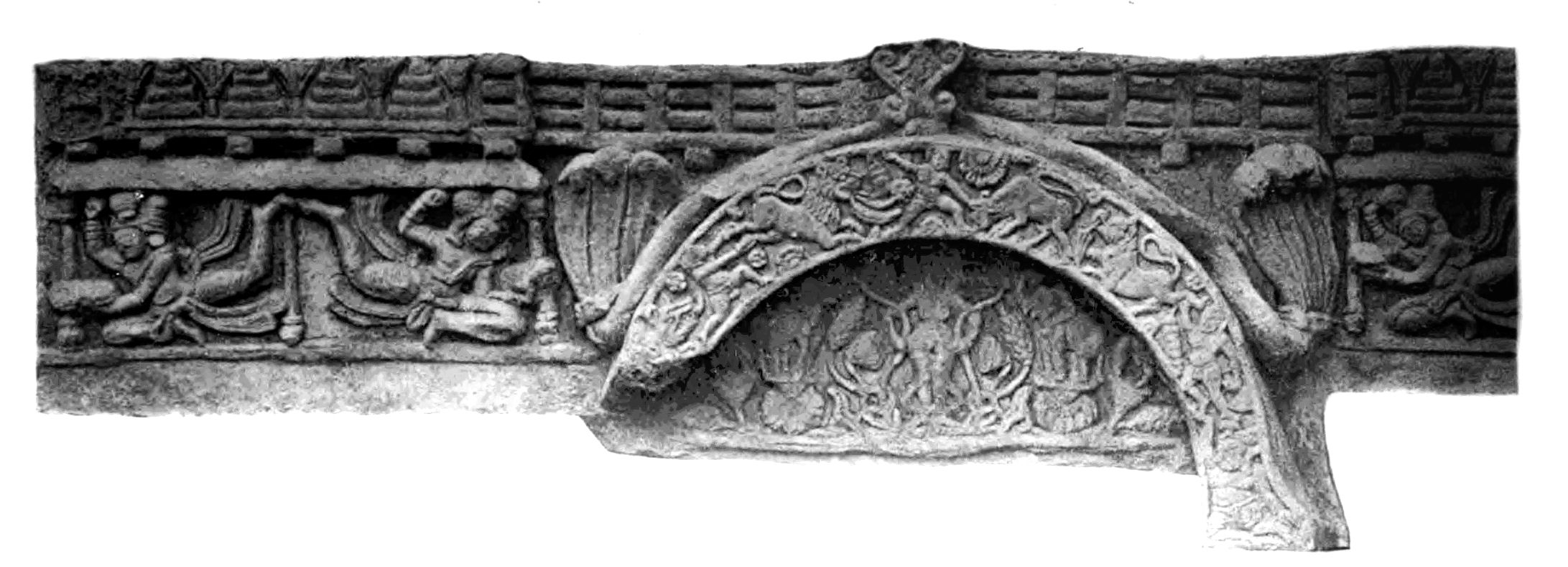
Cave of Ananta Gumpha.

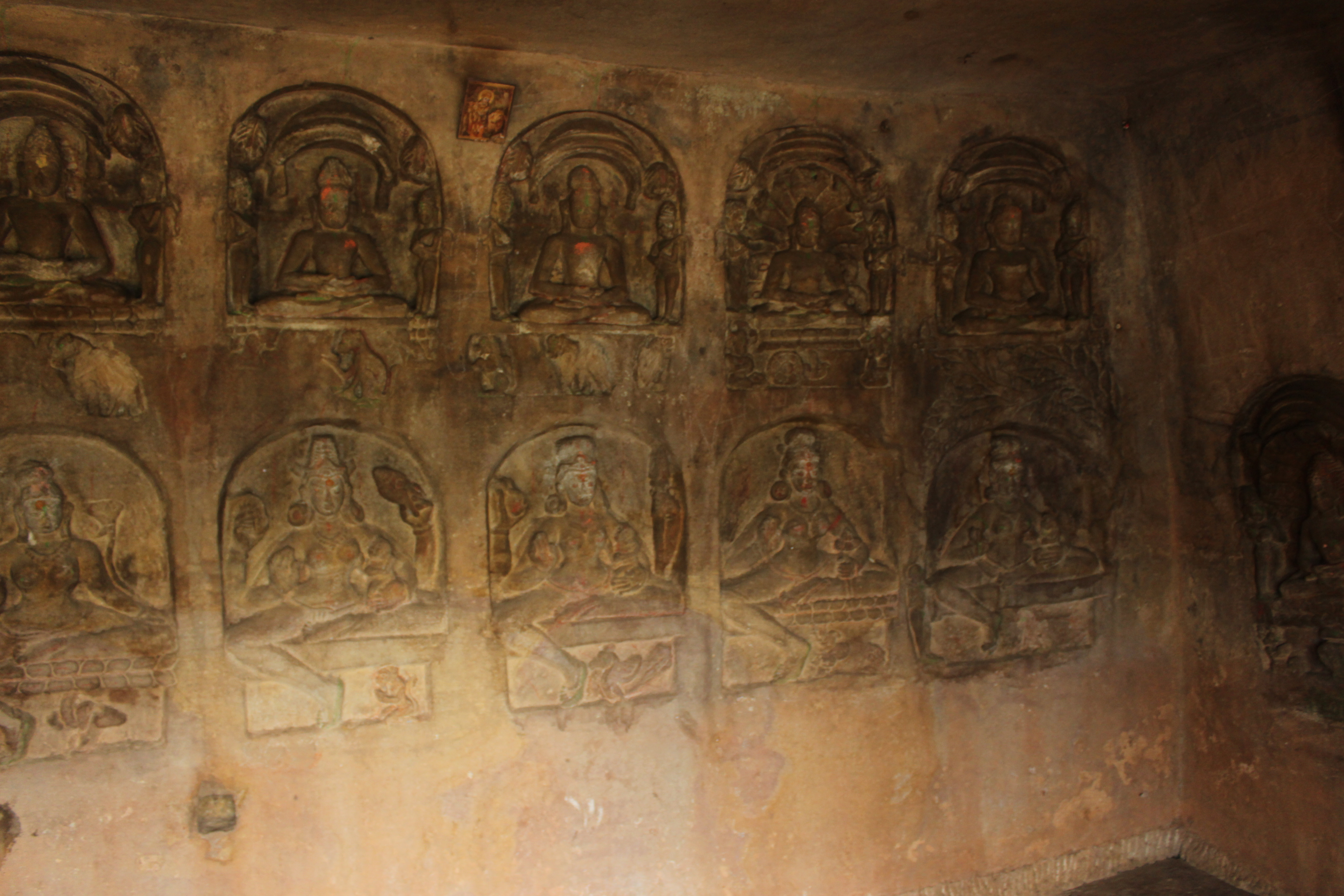
Carving of Tirthankaras & their respective Yakshini (attendant deities) inside Navamuni Gumpha

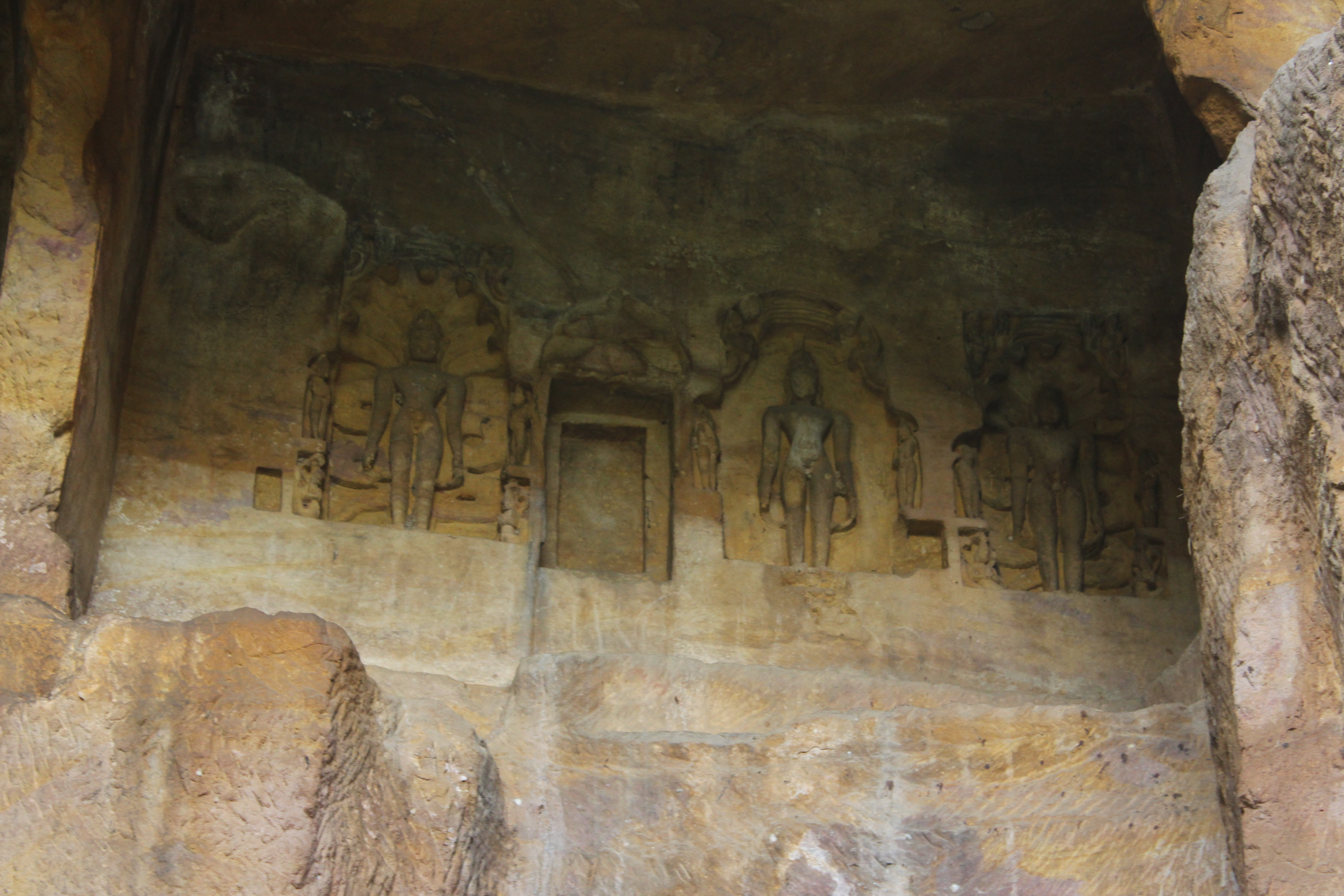
Carving of Jain Tirthankaras, Lalatendu Keshari Gumpha

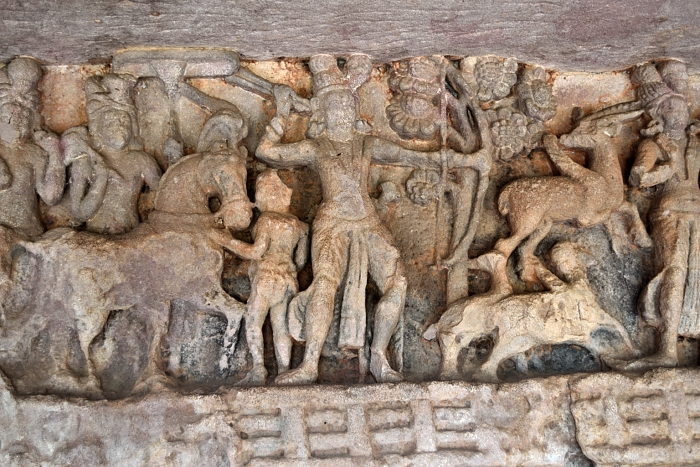
Stone work in Cave 12

The Khandagiri hills fall on your left side when you enter into this area from Bhubaneswar. There are 15 caves in Khandagiri. These caves were renovated during the reign of Uddyotakeshari of Somavamshi dynasty.

1. Tatowa Gumpha

The parrots are carved above the entrance arch and hence it is called as Tatowa Gumpha. It has two dwarapala figures too. There are sculptures of friezes, railing, arch, with kalasa inside the cave.

2. Tatowa Gumpha

The cave is decorated with sculptural friezes like nayikas, gandhrvas, different animals and birds, chaitya arch, pilaster design, rafters and vaulted roof.

3. Ananta Gumpha

The cave has sculptures of women, elephants, geese, etc.

4. Tentuli Gumpha

It is a small rock-cut chamber with just one column.

5. Khandagiri Gumpha

It is a roughly cut cell and has double storeys.

6. Dhyana Gumpha

It is a roughly cut cell.

7. Navamuni Gumpha

Navamuni Gumpha is a roughly cut cell with the sculptures of nine Jain Tirthankaras and Sasana Devis. These sculptures were added to the caves in the 11th century by Somavamshi dynasty.

8. Barabhuji Gumpha

There are altogether twenty five figures of Tirthankaras on the walls of the cell on three sides, Parsvanatha being repeated twice. Beneath the Tirthankara, their respective Sasanadevis are found. Chakareswari is depicted with 12 arms giving the cave name Barabhuji. The image is now worshipped as a Brahminical deity. These sculptures were added to the caves in the 11th century by Somavamshi dynasty.

9. Trusula Gumpha

There are three sculptures of Rishabha Deva who is found in the Kayotsarga posture. Apart from these sculptures, there are sculptures of 24 Jain Tirthankaras which look rough.

10. Ambika Gumpha

There are three relief sculptures, two of Rishabhanatha and one Amra the sasana-devi of Neminatha.

11. Lalatendu Keshari Gumpha

In cell 1, There are 2 images of Rishabhantha and 3 of Parshvanatha and in cell 2, 2 images of Parshvanatha and 1 of Rishabhantha. These sculptures were added to the caves in the 11th century by Somavamshi dynasty.

Caves 12, 13 and 15 are unnamed. Cave 14 is very simple and called Ekadasi Gumpha.

== See also ==
- Hathigumpha inscription
- Kharavela
