= East India =

Group of Eastern Indian states

East India Eastern India
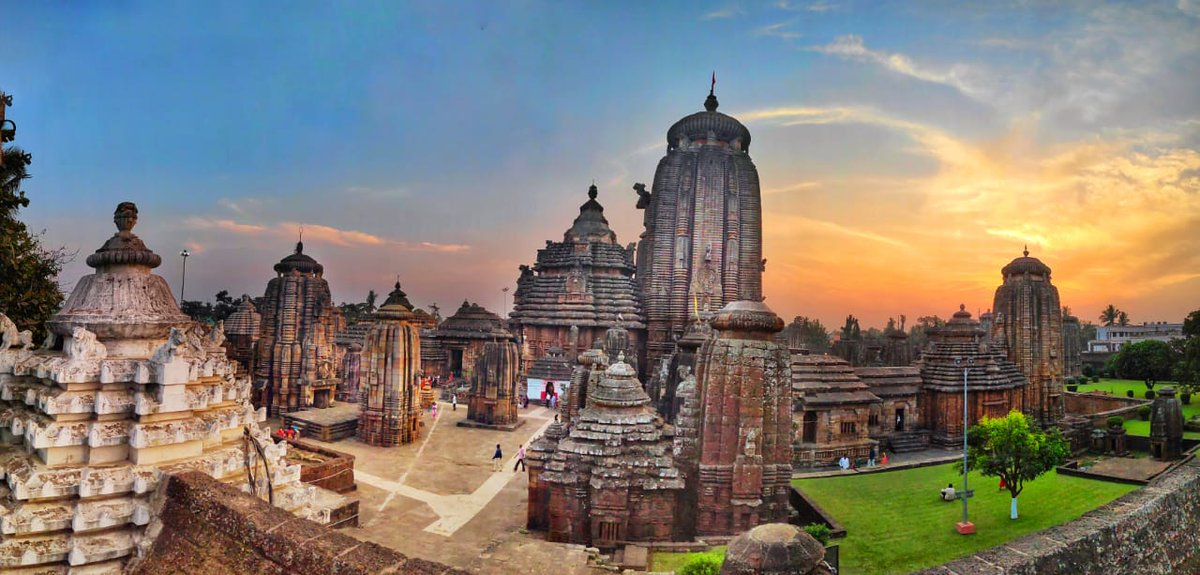
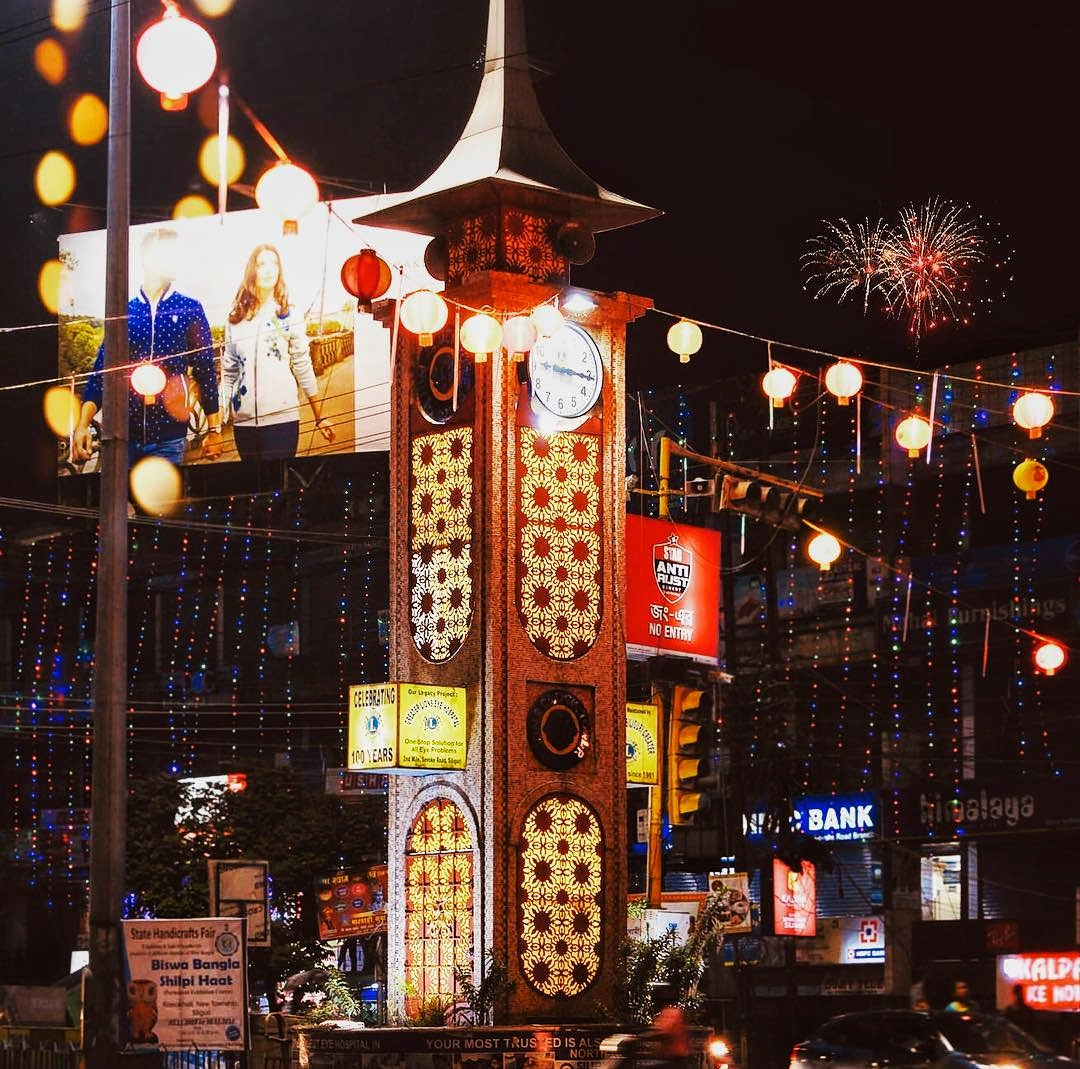
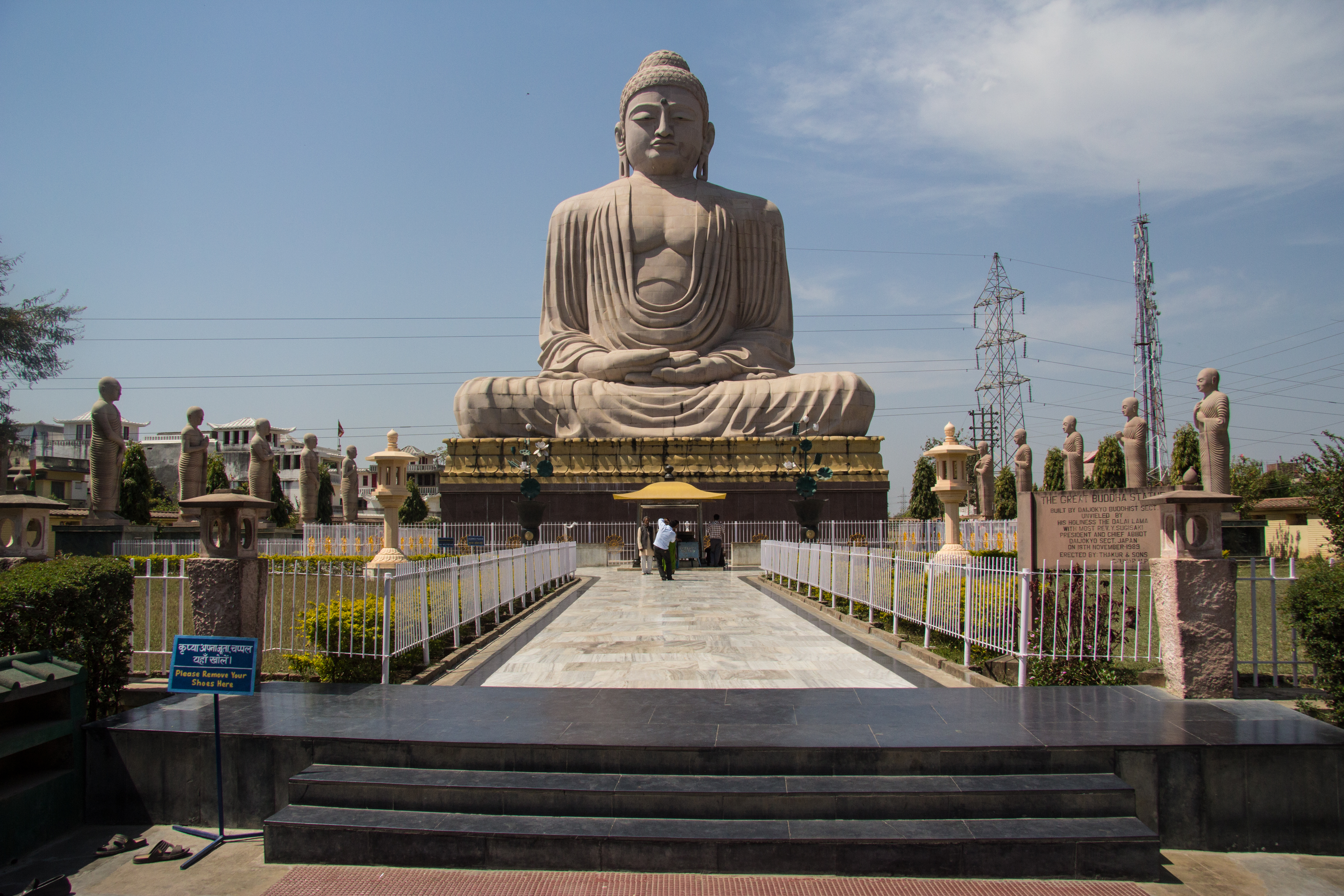
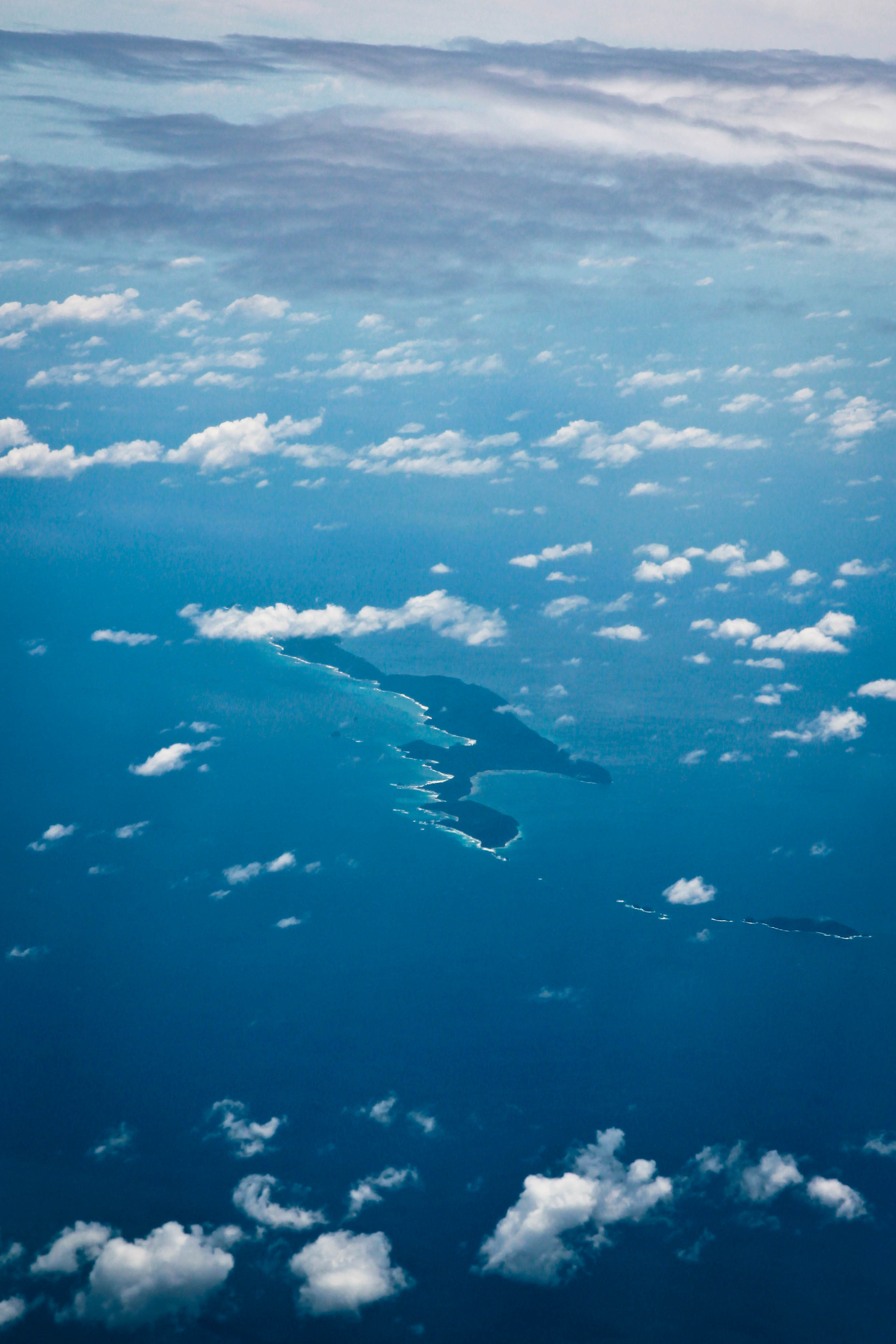
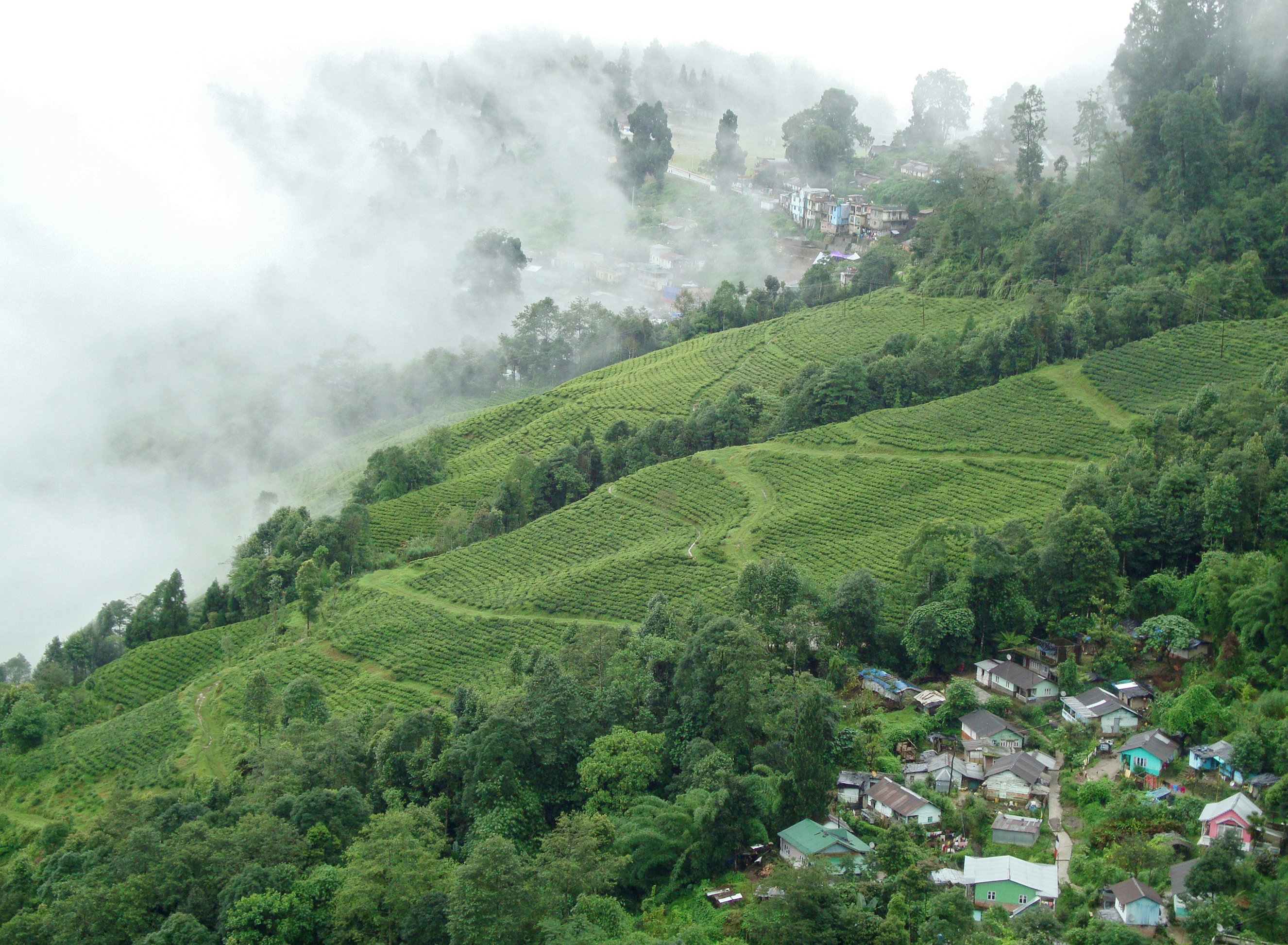
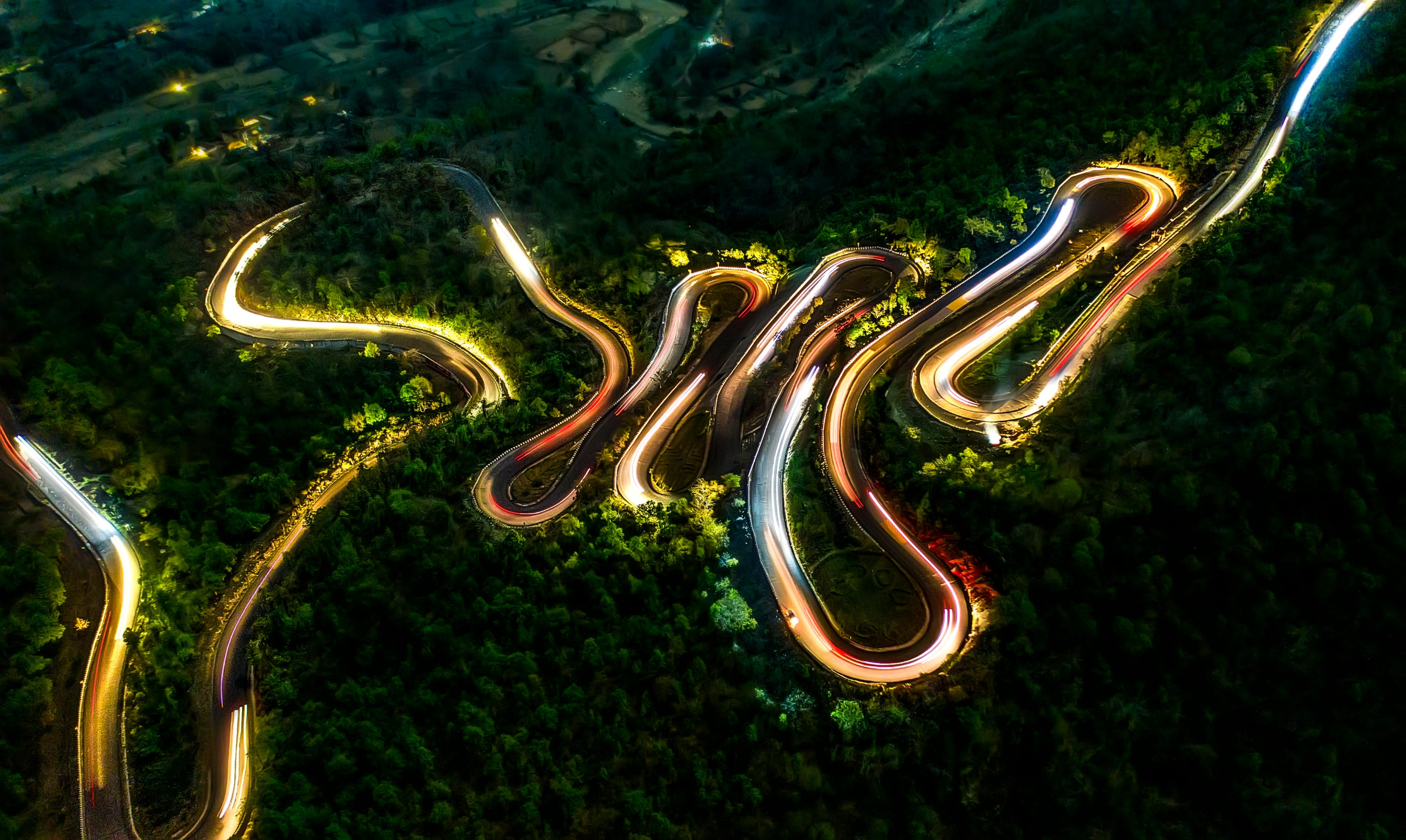
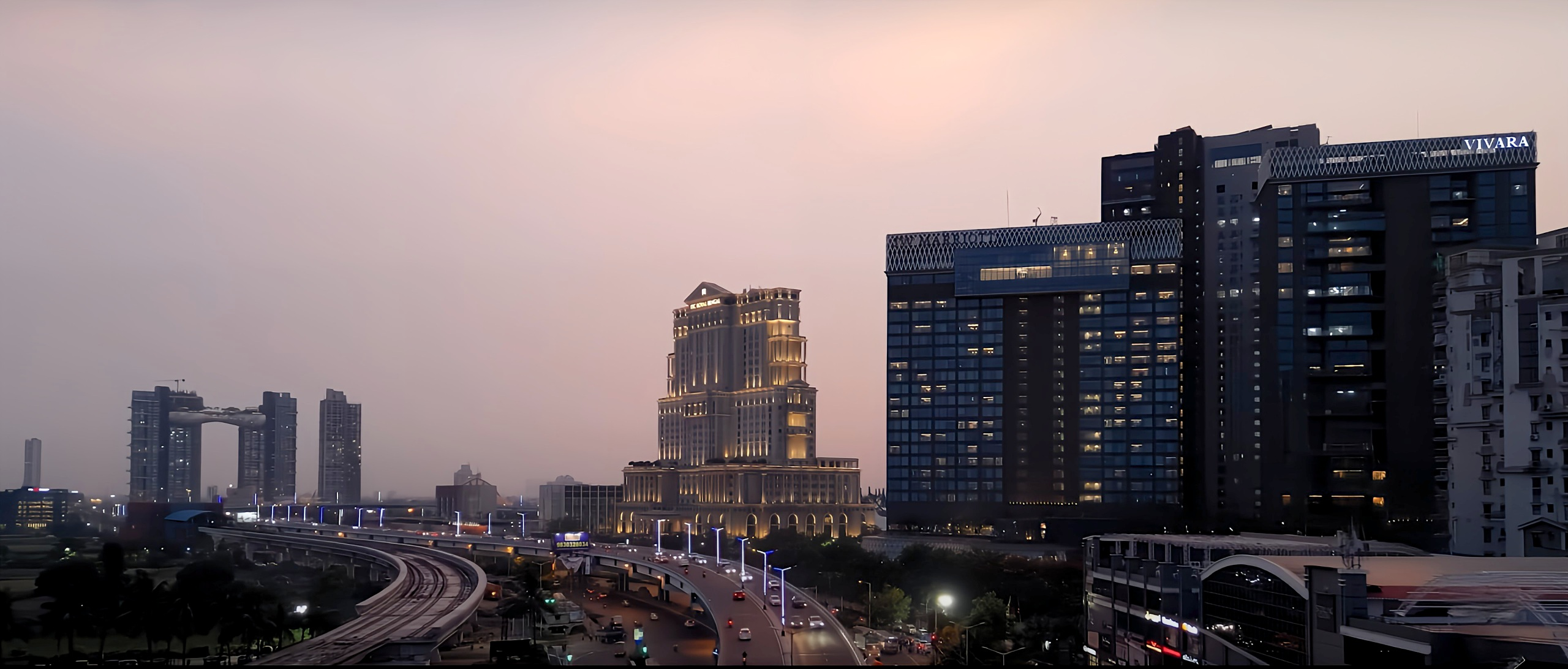
- From top, left to right: Bhubaneswar, Siliguri, Bodh Gaya, Tillangchong, Darjeeling, Patratu Valley, Kolkata

- States and union territories in East India
- Coordinates: 23.25°N 86.00°E
- Country: India
- States and union territories: Andaman and Nicobar Islands; Bihar; Jharkhand; Odisha; West Bengal
- Other states sometimes included: Chhattisgarh
- Largest city: Kolkata
- Most populous cities (2011): Bihar: Patna; Gaya; Bhagalpur; Muzaffarpur; Bihar Sharif/Udantapuri; Jharkhand: Jamshedpur; Dhanbad; Ranchi; Bokaro Steel City; Deoghar; Odisha: Bhubaneswar; Cuttack; Rourkela; Berhampur; Sambalpur; West Bengal: Kolkata; Asansol; Siliguri; Durgapur; Bardhaman

Area
  - Total: 418,323 km^{2} (161,515 sq mi)

Population
  - Total: 312,025,195
  - Density: 745.895/km^{2} (1,931.86/sq mi)
- Time zone: IST (UTC+5:30)
- Official languages: Bengali; Bhojpuri; English; Hindi; Maithili; Nepali; Odia; Santali; Urdu; Nagpuri

East India is a region consisting of the Indian states of Bihar, Jharkhand, Odisha and West Bengal and also the union territory of the Andaman and Nicobar Islands. Chhattisgarh is sometimes included, due to its geographical continuity as well as cultural and economic integration with the Eastern region.

The states of Bihar and West Bengal lie on the Indo-Gangetic Plain. Jharkhand is situated on the Chota Nagpur Plateau. Odisha lies on the Eastern Ghats and the Deccan Plateau. West Bengal's capital Kolkata is the largest city of this region. The Kolkata Metropolitan Area is the country's third largest metropolitan region. The region is bounded by Bhutan, Nepal and the state of Sikkim in the north, the states of Uttar Pradesh and Chhattisgarh on the west, the state of Andhra Pradesh in the south and the country of Bangladesh in the east. It is also bounded by the Bay of Bengal in the south-east. It is connected to the Seven Sister States of Northeast India by the narrow Siliguri Corridor in the north east of West Bengal. East India has the fourth-largest gross domestic product of all Indian regions.

The region was ruled by several empires, including Gangaridai, Nandas, Mauryans, Guptas, Palas, Bhauma-Kara dynasty, Senas, Eastern Gangas, Gajapatis, Delhi Sultanate, Bengal Sultanate, Mughal Empire, and the British Empire.

== History ==
=== Ancient era ===
Anga, Vanga, Kalinga, and Suhma were the core regions of eastern India during the Mahajanapada period (c. 500 BCE).

Map of the Maha-Megavahanas empire, East India

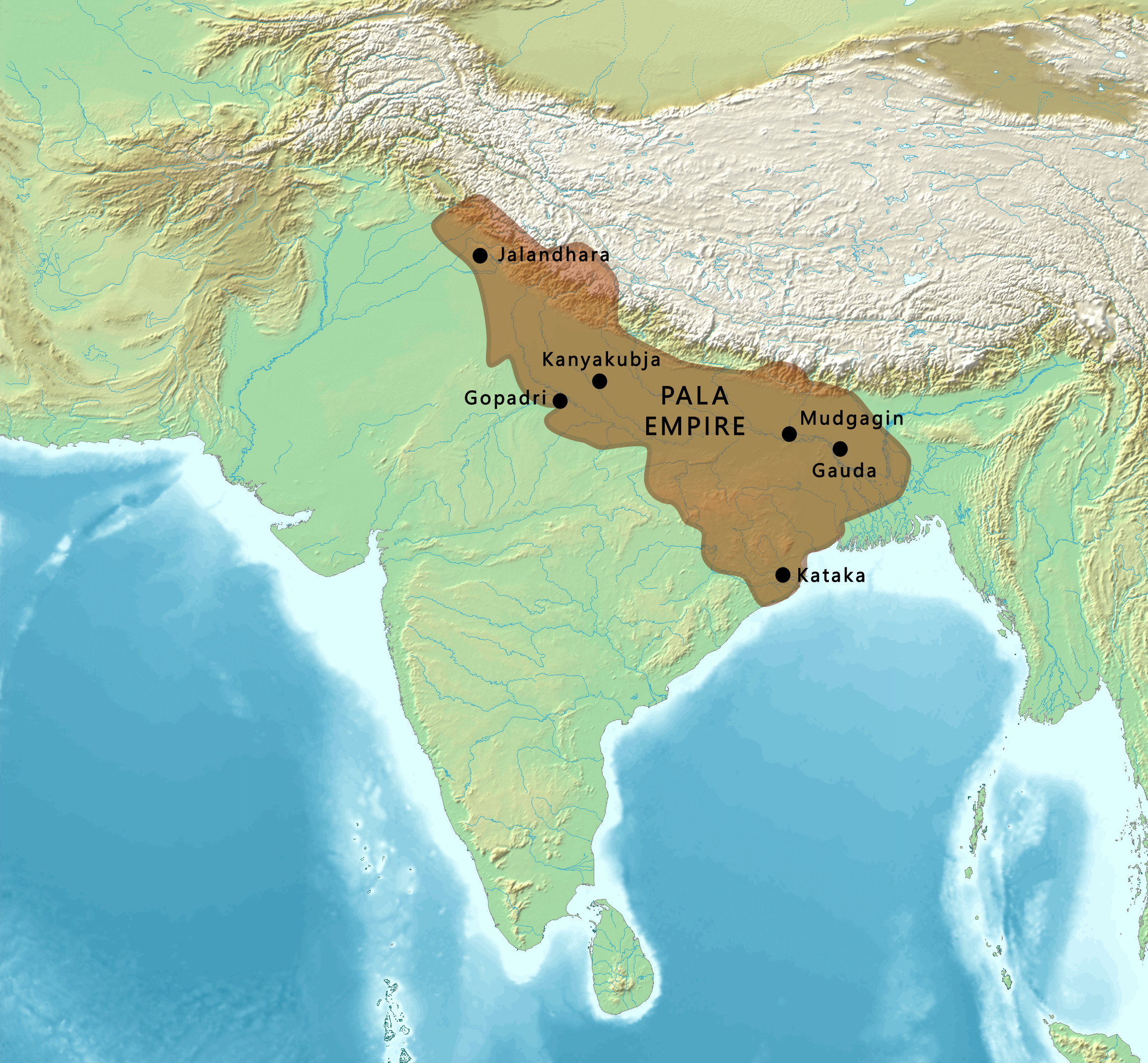
The Pala Empire in the ninth century CE

During the Neolithic period, agriculture started in South Asia. Neolithic settlements have been found in Chirand. In the Kabra-Kala mound at the confluence of the Sone and North Koel rivers in Palamu district, various antiquities and art objects from the Neolithic to medieval periods have been found; the pot-sherds of redware, black and red ware, black ware, black slipped ware, and NBP ware are from the Chalcolithic to late medieval periods. There are ancient cave paintings in Isko, Hazaribagh district, from the Meso-chalcolithic period (9,000–5,000 BCE). From Kuchai, near Baripada, various Neolithic tools like hoes, chisels, pounders, mace heads, grinding stones and also pieces of pottery. Prehistoric paintings and inscriptions have also been found in Garjan Dongar in Sundergarh district, and Ushakothi in Sambalpur district and Vimkramkhol in Jharsuguda district. There has been an uncertainty about the inscriptions at Ushakothi and Vimkramkhol regarding whether they are in a proto-Brahmi script. Yogimath near Khariar has cave paintings from the Neolithic. There is Chalcolithic sites in Pandu Rajar Dhibi in the lower Ajay valley in West Bengal. Dihar is an archaeological site of Neolithic and Early village farming culture located in the Bankura district of West Bengal. Construction of the settlement in Dihar is believed to have started around 2700 BC. Evidence of 42,000 years old human habitation has been found at the foothills of the Ajodhya Hills in West Bengal. Iron slag, microliths, and potsherds from 1400 BCE, according to carbon dating, were discovered in Singhbhum district. During the late Vedic period, several janapadas emerged in India. In the 6th century BCE, the mahajanapadas emerged in several parts of the Indian subcontinent.

The region was the historical centre of the Nanda, Maurya, Shunga, Gupta and Pala empires that ruled much of the Indian sub-continent at their prime. In medieval India, it was incorporated into the Mughal, Maratha and then the British empire. After independence in 1947, the states joined the Indian Union and took their current form after the States Reorganisation Act of 1956. Today, they continue to face problems of overpopulation, environmental degradation and pervasive corruption despite significant economic and social progress.

After the Kalinga War the Maurya king Ashoka sent emissaries to spread Buddhism across Asia. The university of Nalanda was in Bihar. Chinese travellers visited Buddhist and Hindu temples and libraries in the universities of Magadha Empire. The Emperor of Kalinga Mahameghavahana Aira Kharavela was one of the most powerful monarchs of ancient India. The Jain thirkhankar Mahaveer was born here and founded Jainism.

=== Indo-Muslim era ===
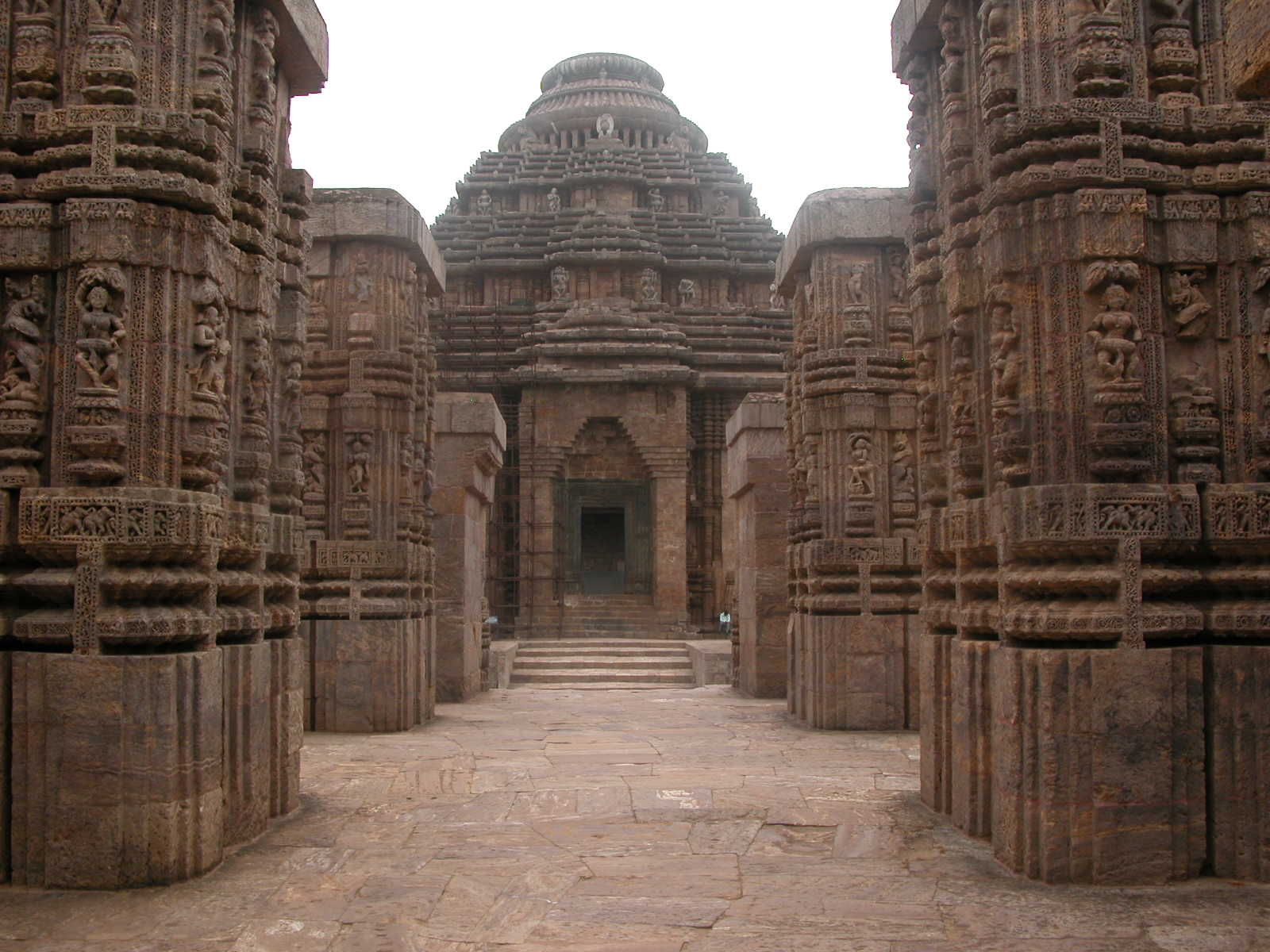
Konark Sun Temple built by the Eastern Ganga dynasty is a UNESCO World Heritage Site in Odisha

Islamic invasions in the 13th century resulted in the collapse of Hindu kings and most Buddhists, especially in East Bengal, converted to Islam. East India including Bihar and West Bengal was part of the Mughal Empire in the 16th and 17th centuries. Odisha remained the only powerful Hindu dynastic stronghold under the rule of Soma/Keshari Dynasty, Bhanja Dynasty, Eastern Ganga Dynasty, Suryavanshi Dynasty and Bhoi(Khordha) dynasty till the end of the 16th century. The mighty Nalanda University existed at Nalanda which was destroyed by Bakhtiar Khilji during the 12th century and also defeated Sena Dynasty. Sher Shah Suri, who became king of India after defeating Humayun, founded the city of Patna on the ruins of ancient Pataliputra.

Islam arrived during the 7th century CE and became dominant gradually since the early 13th century with the advent of Muslim rulers as well as Sunni missionaries such as Shah Jalal in the region. Later, Muslim rulers, starting from the Delhi Sultanate initiated the preaching of Islam by building mosques. From the 14th century onward, it was ruled by the Bengal Sultanate, founded by king Shamsuddin Ilyas Shah, beginning a period of the country's economic prosperity and military dominance over the regional empires, which was referred by the Europeans to as the richest country to trade with. Afterwards, the entire East India came under the Mughal Empire, becoming as the most advanced parts in the world. Bengal Subah generated almost half of the empire's GDP and 12% of the world's GDP, larger than the entirety of western Europe.

=== Colonial era ===
With the arrival of the Europeans in the 17th century, outposts were established in Odisha Coast and Bengal. The European traders established their trade centres in the ports of Balasore, Pipili, Palur in the Odisha Coast during the rule of the last independent Hindu king Gajapati Prataprudra Dev. The Portuguese were in Chittagong, Dutch in Chinsura, French in Pondicherry and the English founded Calcutta. The Maratha Invasion of Bengal badly affected the economy of Bengal and it is estimated that 400,000 people were butchered by the Hindu Maratha bargis and many women and children gang raped, and the genocide has been considered to be among the deadliest massacres in Indian history. In 1756, the British East India Company defeated the local Indian Muslim rulers in Plassey and established British Rule in the subcontinent. Its capital Calcutta grew into one of the world's greatest ports. Tea from Calcutta was off-loaded by American separatists in the American War of Independence in the 1770s. In the 19th century, Calcutta's traders and merchants traded with the rest of the British Empire, continental Europe, the United States and China. Indentured Indian labourers from Bihar, sailed to new homes in Fiji, Mauritius, Guyana, Surinam and South Africa.

India's independence movement had strong roots in East India. The feudal land system, established through the Permanent Settlement of Bengal, was unpopular among the peasant cultivators and the numerous agricultural labourers found all over Bihar and Bengal (Khetmazdoors). The Indian Rebellion of 1857 started in Bengal. Eventually the British prevailed, and Calcutta remained capital of Britain's Asian dominions until 1911. During Gandhi's independence movement, the Bihari village of Champaran was an important supporter of non-violent resistance. Great poets of the stature of Rabindranath Tagore championed the movement for self-rule.

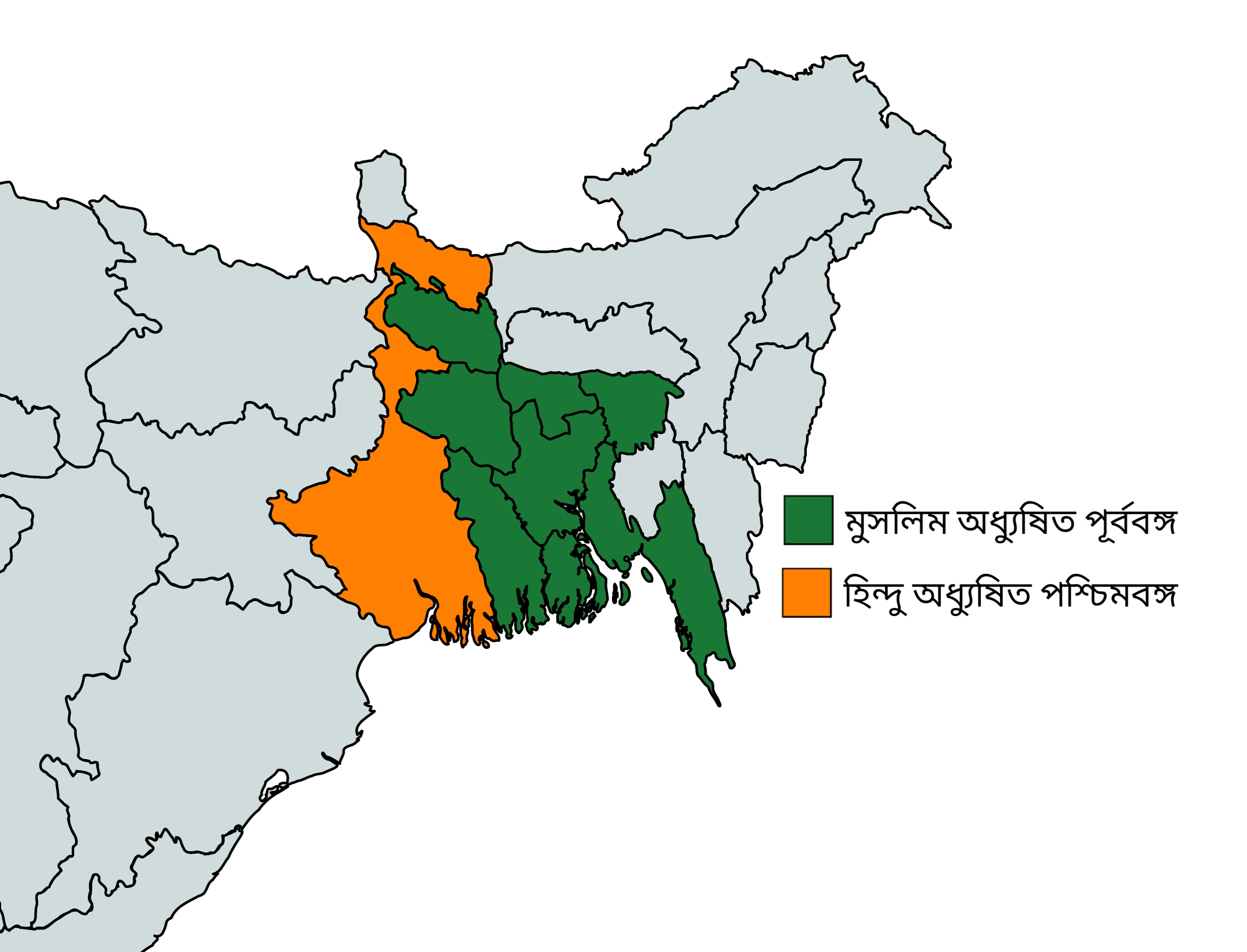
The 1947 partition of Bengal saw East Bengal (green) become East Pakistan, and in 1971 it became Bangladesh

The Partition also had its roots in undivided Eastern India. The Muslim League was founded in Dhaka in 1906. In the 1937 provincial elections, it came to power in Bengal in alliance with the Krishak Praja Party. in 1944, it gained an absolute majority in the Bengal Assembly, and Hussein Suhrawardy became the Chief Minister. After widespread communal violence during the Direct Action Day protests in Calcutta, leading to further communal violence across British India, the creation of Pakistan became inevitable. In 1947, further communal violence displaced millions as independence and partition of British India occurred. Some Bihari and Bengali Muslims fled to the newly created East Pakistan. Most East Bengal Hindus fled to India.

=== Contemporary era ===
The 1950s saw industrial progress in East India. These were cut short with the conflict in neighbouring East Pakistan and by the Communist movement at home. In 1971, in the course of Bangladesh's independence struggle, millions of refugees poured into East India. Bihar and Odisha struggled with economic issues during the British rule and in the beginning of post independent India due to rising naxalism and frequent natural calamities such as flood and cyclone.

But in recent years, the state of Odisha has shown impressive growth record and developed steadily. The economic boom since 2005 started to spread new malls, highways, airports and IT office complexes, but not evenly across the region. Jharkhand became a separate state on 15 November 2000 from Bihar. In the modern times, these states have seen rapid transformation and home to several mineral and metal based industries, coal based thermal powers units, oil refineries, ports, textile industries and well established public and private educational institutes. West Bengal, Bihar, Odisha and Jharkhand rank 6th, 16th, 14th and 18th in the List of Indian states by GDP. Odisha has shown consistent growth in the state GDP and received the recognition of the fastest-growing economy among the states in India.

== Education ==
Nalanda, Puspagiri and Vikramshila universities were the famed institutions of higher learning in ancient India located in Eastern India. One of the first great universities in recorded history was the ancient Nalanda University located in Bihar and another institute of higher learning was the ancient Puspagiri University recently discovered in Odisha. Education in the eastern part of India has seen rapid transformation. Several new educational institutes have been established to cater the needs of students. East India is now the home to some of the great Indian universities and Institutions of National Importance. Some prominent institutions of higher learning located in the states of Eastern India are listed below.

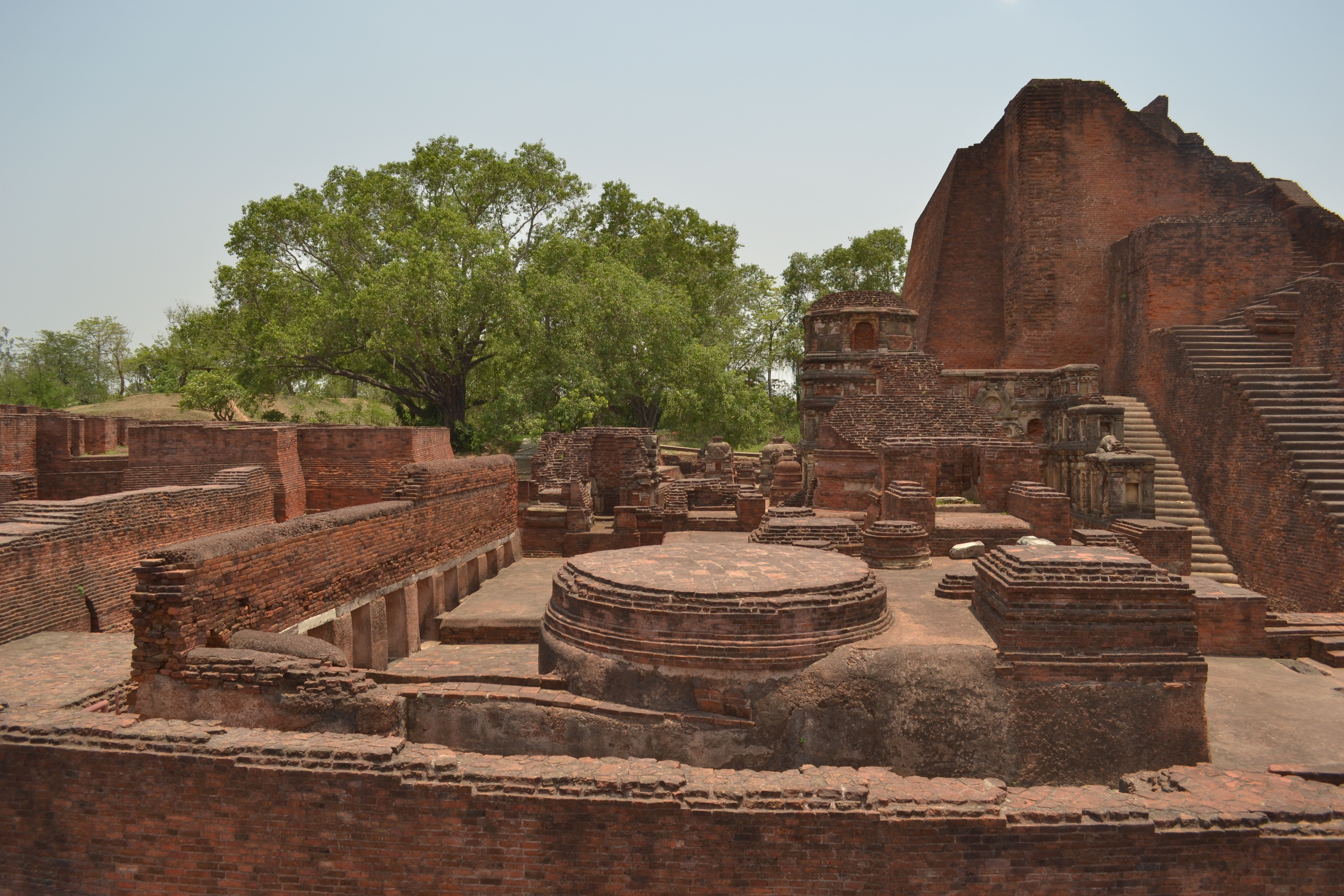
Famed Buddhist Nalanda University & Monastery ruins in Bihar

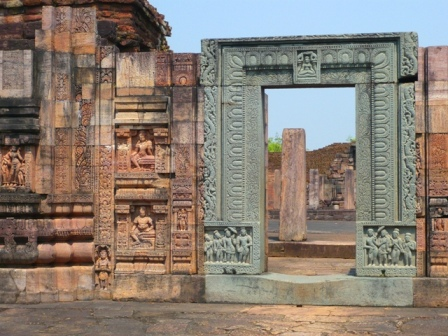
Ratnagiri, Odisha, Part of Puspagiri University

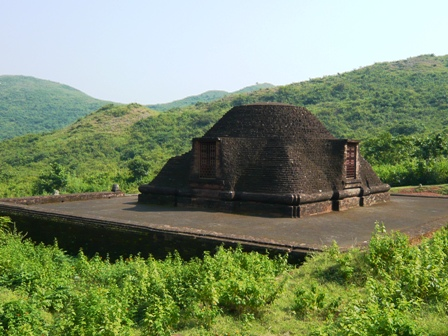
Udayagiri, Odisha, Part of Puspagiri University

=== Bihar ===
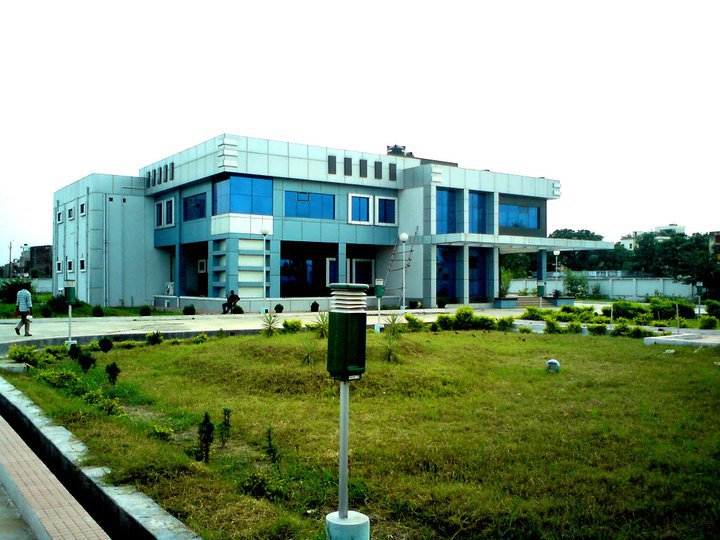
Software Technology Park of India, IIT Patna

- All India Institute of Medical Sciences, Patna
- Aryabhatta Knowledge University, Patna
- Bhagalpur College of Engineering
- Birla Institute of Technology, Patna
- Central Institute of Plastics Engineering & Technology, Hajipur
- Chanakya National Law University, Patna
- Chandragupt Institute of Management, Patna
- Indian Institute of Management Bodh Gaya
- Indian Institute of Technology Patna
- Katihar Engineering College
- Loknayak Jai Prakash Institute of Technology Chhapra
- Institute of Hotel Management, Hajipur
- Muzaffarpur Institute of Technology
- Nalanda University
- National Institute of Fashion Technology Patna
- National Institute of Pharmaceutical Education and Research, Hajipur
- National Institute of Technology, Patna
- Patna Medical College and Hospital
- Patna University
- Purnea University
- Vidya Vihar Institute of Technology, Purnia

=== Jharkhand ===
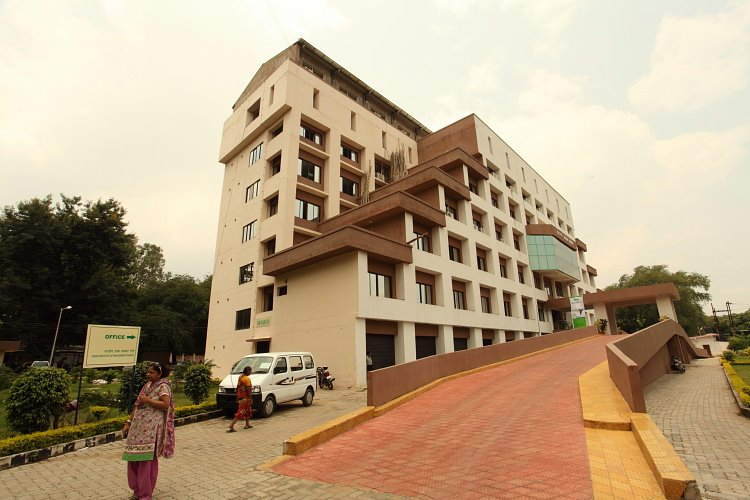
Indian Institute of Management, Ranchi

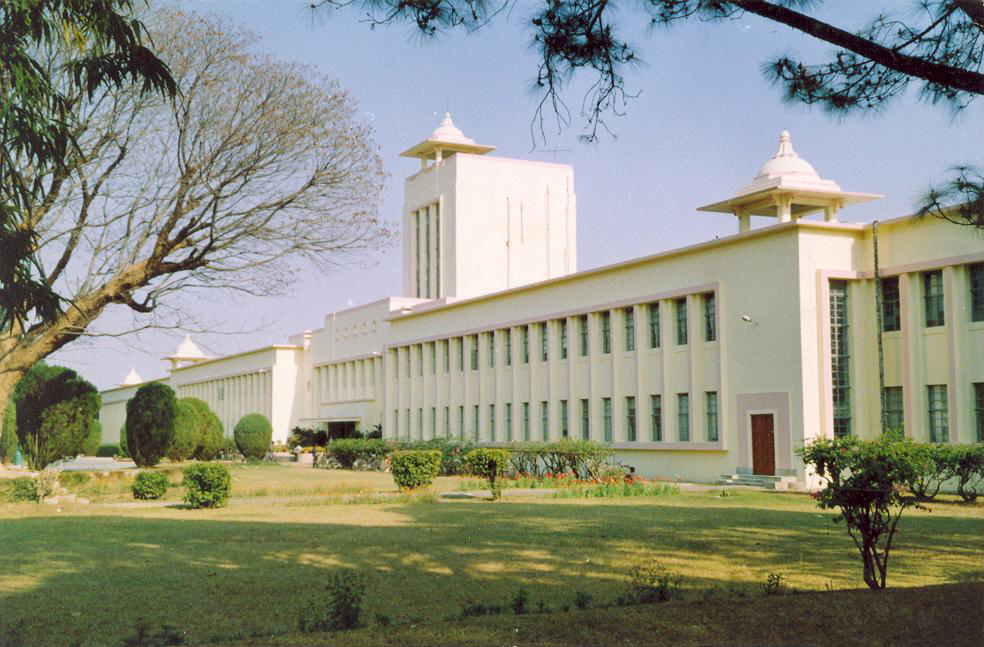
Birla Institute of Technology, Mesra

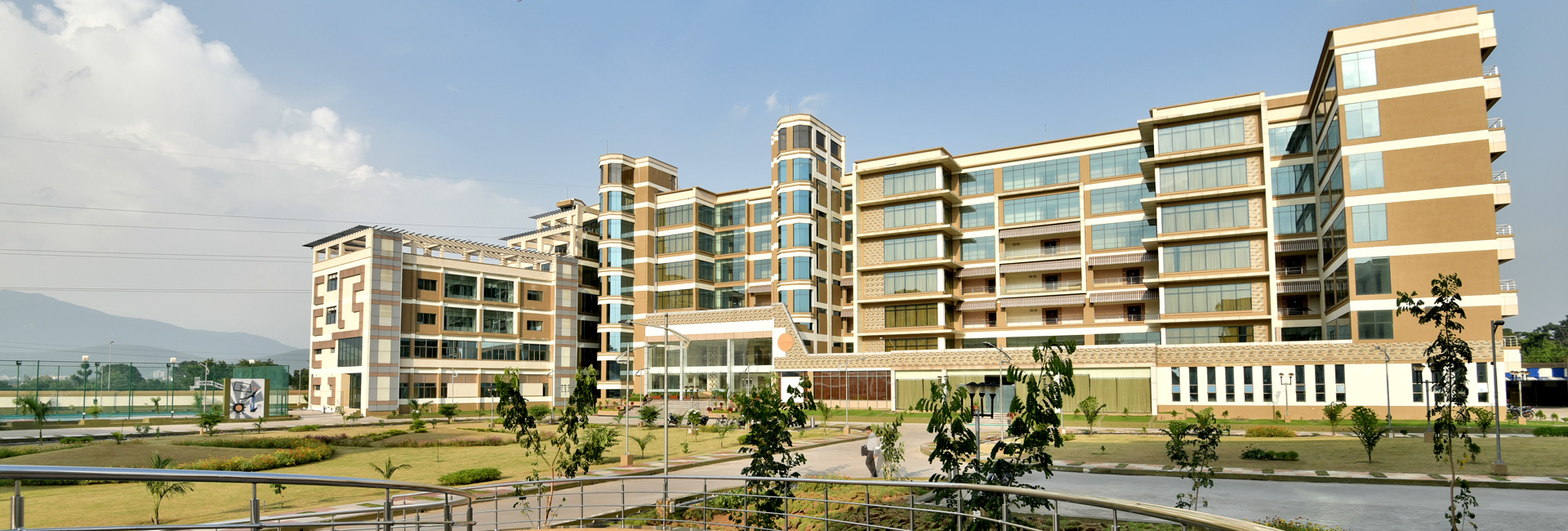
XLRI Jamshedpur

- All India Institute of Medical Sciences (AIIMS), Deoghar
- Binod Bihari Mahto Koyalanchal University, Dhanbad
- Birla Institute of Technology, Mesra, Ranchi
- Birsa Agricultural University, Ranchi
- Birsa Institute of Technology Sindri, Dhanbad, AKA BIT Sindri
- Central University of Jharkhand, Ranchi
- Indian Institute of Management Ranchi, AKA IIM Ranchi
- Indian Institute of Technology, AKA IIT Dhanbad, formerly Indian School of Mines University
- National Institute of Technology, Jamshedpur
- National Institute of Foundry and Forge Technology, Ranchi
- Patliputra Medical College and Hospital, Dhanbad
- Phulo Jhano Murmu Medical College and Hospital, Dumka
- Rajendra Institute of Medical Sciences Ranchi
- Sido Kanhu Murmu University Dumka
- Vinoba Bhave University Hazaribagh
- Xavier Institute of Social Service (XISS), Ranchi
- XLRI - Xavier School of Management, Jamshedpur

=== Odisha ===
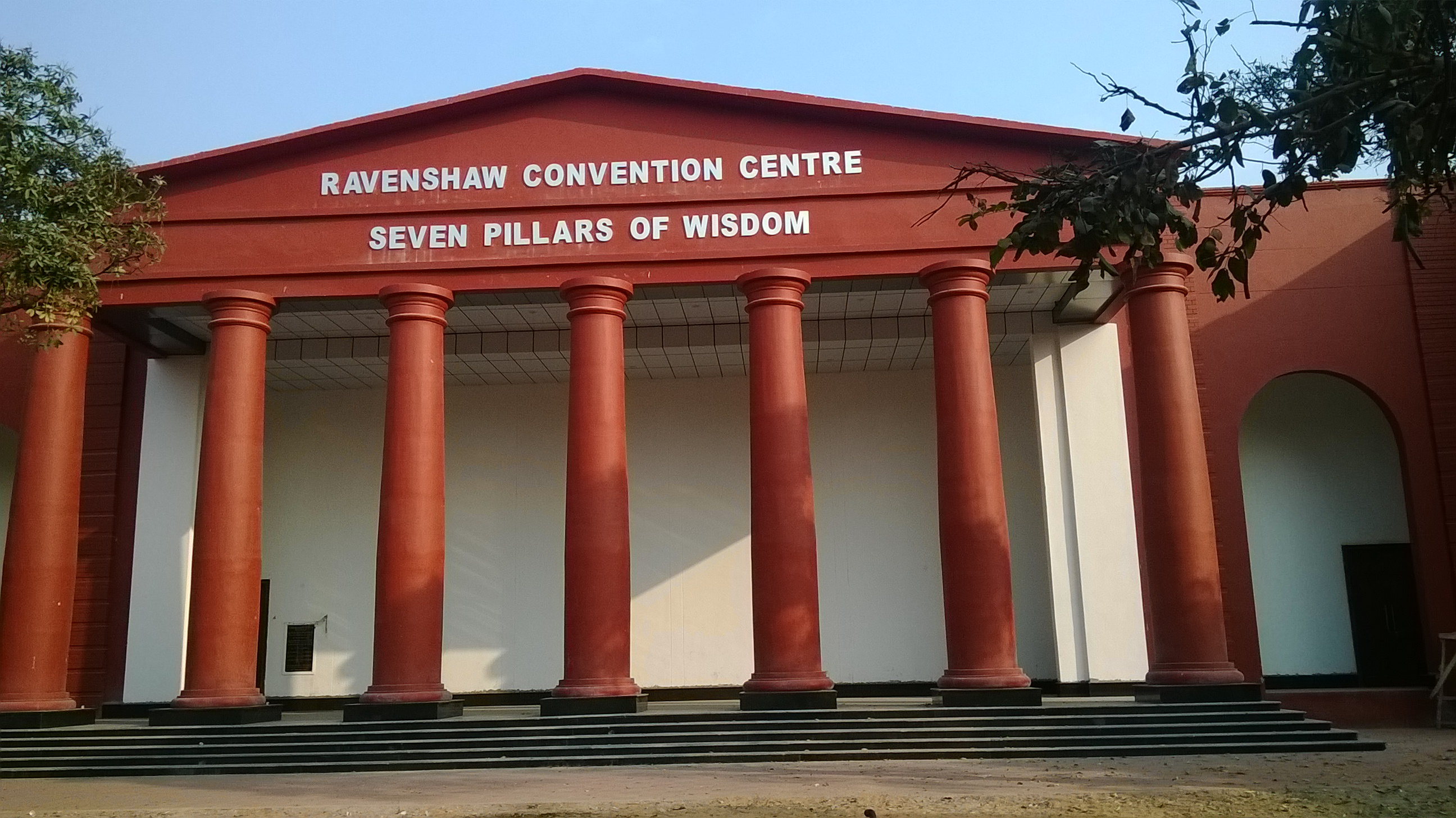
Ravenshaw Convention Centre, Ravenshaw University, Cuttack, Odisha

- All India Institute of Medical Sciences, Bhubaneswar
- Army Air Defence College, Gopalpur, Brahmapur
- Berhampur University, Berhampur
- Biju Patnaik University of Technology, Rourkela
- Central University of Odisha, Koraput
- Centurion University of Technology and Management, Bhubaneswar
- College of Engineering and Technology, Bhubaneswar
- Indian Institute of Mass Communication, Dhenkanal
- Indian Institute of Technology Bhubaneswar
- Indian Institutes of Management, Sambalpur
- Indian Institutes of Science Education and Research, Berhampur
- Institute of Medical Sciences and Sum Hospital, Bhubaneswar
- Institute of Physics, Bhubaneswar
- International Institute of Information Technology, Bhubaneswar
- Kalinga Institute of Industrial Technology, AKA KIIT University, Bhubaneswar
- Kalinga Institute of Medical Sciences, Bhubaneswar
- National Institute of Fashion Technology, Bhubaneswar
- National Institute of Science and Technology, Berhampur
- National Institute of Science Education and Research, Bhubaneswar
- National Institutes of Technology, Rourkela
- National Law University Odisha
- North Orissa University, Baripada
- Odisha University of Agriculture and Technology, Bhubaneswar
- Pandit Raghunath Murmu Medical College and Hospital Baripada
- Ravenshaw University, Cuttack
- Regional Institute of Education, Bhubaneswar
- Sambalpur University, Sambalpur
- Siksha 'O' Anusandhan, Bhubaneswar
- Sri Sri University, Cuttack
- Srirama Chandra Bhanja Medical College and Hospital, Cuttack
- Utkal University, Bhubaneswar
- Veer Surendra Sai Institute of Medical Sciences and Research, Burla
- Veer Surendra Sai University of Technology, Burla
- Xavier Institute of Management, Bhubaneswar

=== West Bengal ===
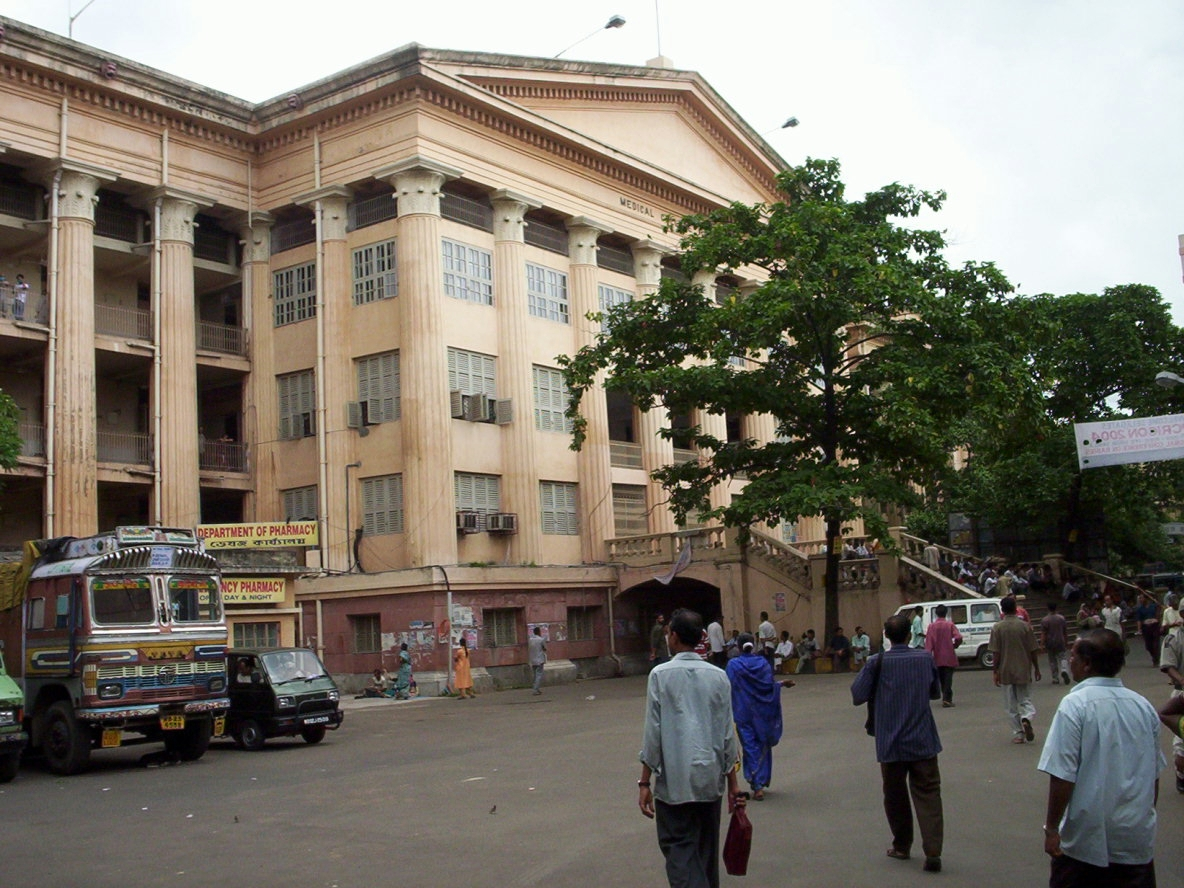
Medical College and Hospital, Kolkata

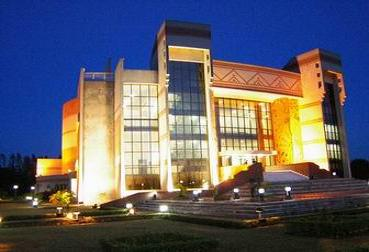
Auditorium of IIM Calcutta

- Adamas University, Kolkata
- Aliah University, Kolkata
- Amity University, Kolkata
- Asansol Engineering College, Asansol
- Calcutta National Medical College
- Government College of Engineering & Textile Technology Serampore
- Government College of Engineering & Textile Technology, Berhampore
- Haldia Institute of Technology, Haldia
- Heritage Institute of Technology, Kolkata
- Indian Institute of Foreign Trade
- Indian Association for the Cultivation of Science
- Indian Institute of Chemical Biology
- Indian Institute of Engineering Science and Technology, Shibpur, formerly Bengal Engineering and Science University
- Indian Institute of Management Calcutta
- Indian Institute of Technology Kharagpur
- Indian Institutes of Science Education and Research, Kolkata
- Indian Statistical Institute, Kolkata
- Jadavpur University
- Jalpaiguri Government Engineering College
- JIS University, Kolkata
- Kalyani Government Engineering College
- Kazi Nazrul University, Asansol
- Maulana Abul Kalam Azad University of Technology
- Medical College and Hospital, Kolkata
- Narula Institute of Technology, Kolkata
- National Institute of Technology, Durgapur
- Nil Ratan Sircar Medical College and Hospital
- Presidency University, Kolkata
- Rabindra Bharati University, Kolkata
- S. N. Bose National Centre for Basic Sciences
- Saha Institute of Nuclear Physics
- Satyajit Ray Film and Television Institute, Kolkata
- Sidho Kanho Birsha University Purulia
- University of Burdwan
- University of Calcutta
- University of Engineering & Management (UEM), Kolkata
- University of Gour Banga, Malda
- University of Kalyani
- University of North Bengal, Siliguri
- Vidyasagar University
- Visva-Bharati University, Bolpur
- West Bengal National University of Juridical Sciences, Kolkata

== Urban areas ==
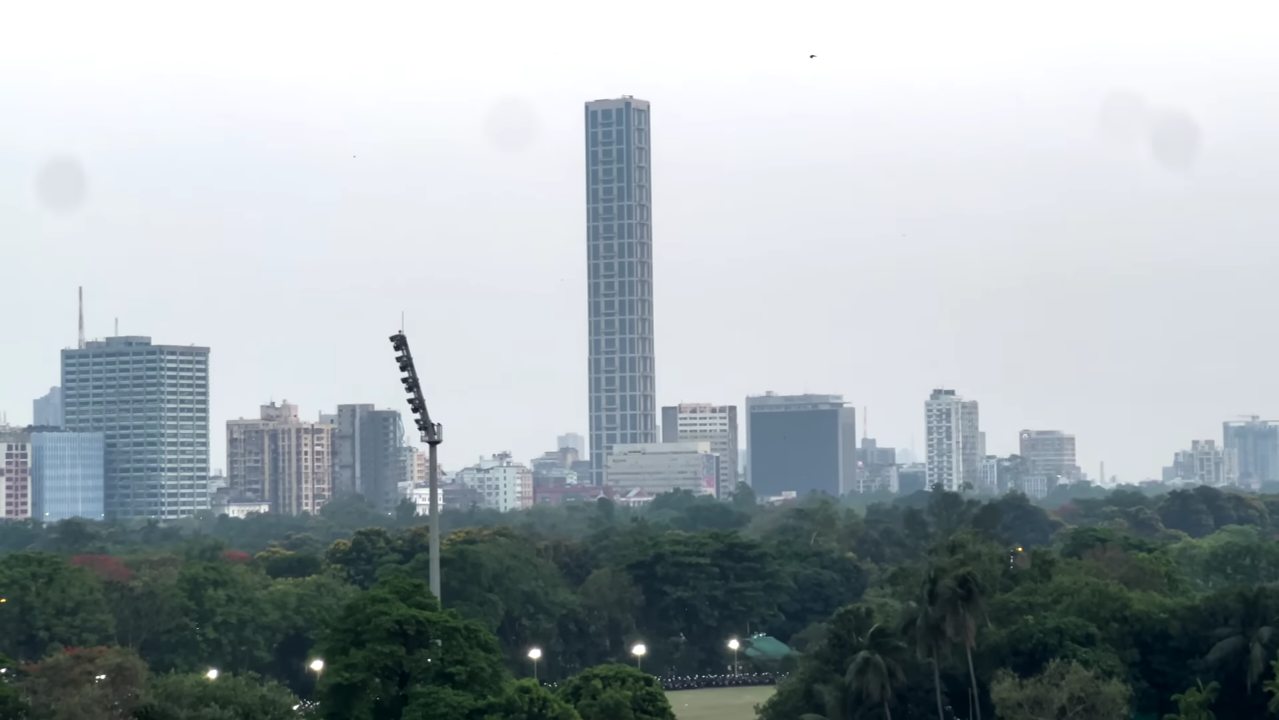
Skyline in Kolkata

There were many ancient cities established in Eastern India. Prominent among them were Pataliputra, Bangarh, Tamralipta, Champapuri, Chandraketugarh, Dantapura, Gauda, Katak, Sisupalgarh, Tosali, Gaya, Jaugada, Pandua, Rajapura, Asurgarh and Vaishali.

=== West Bengal ===
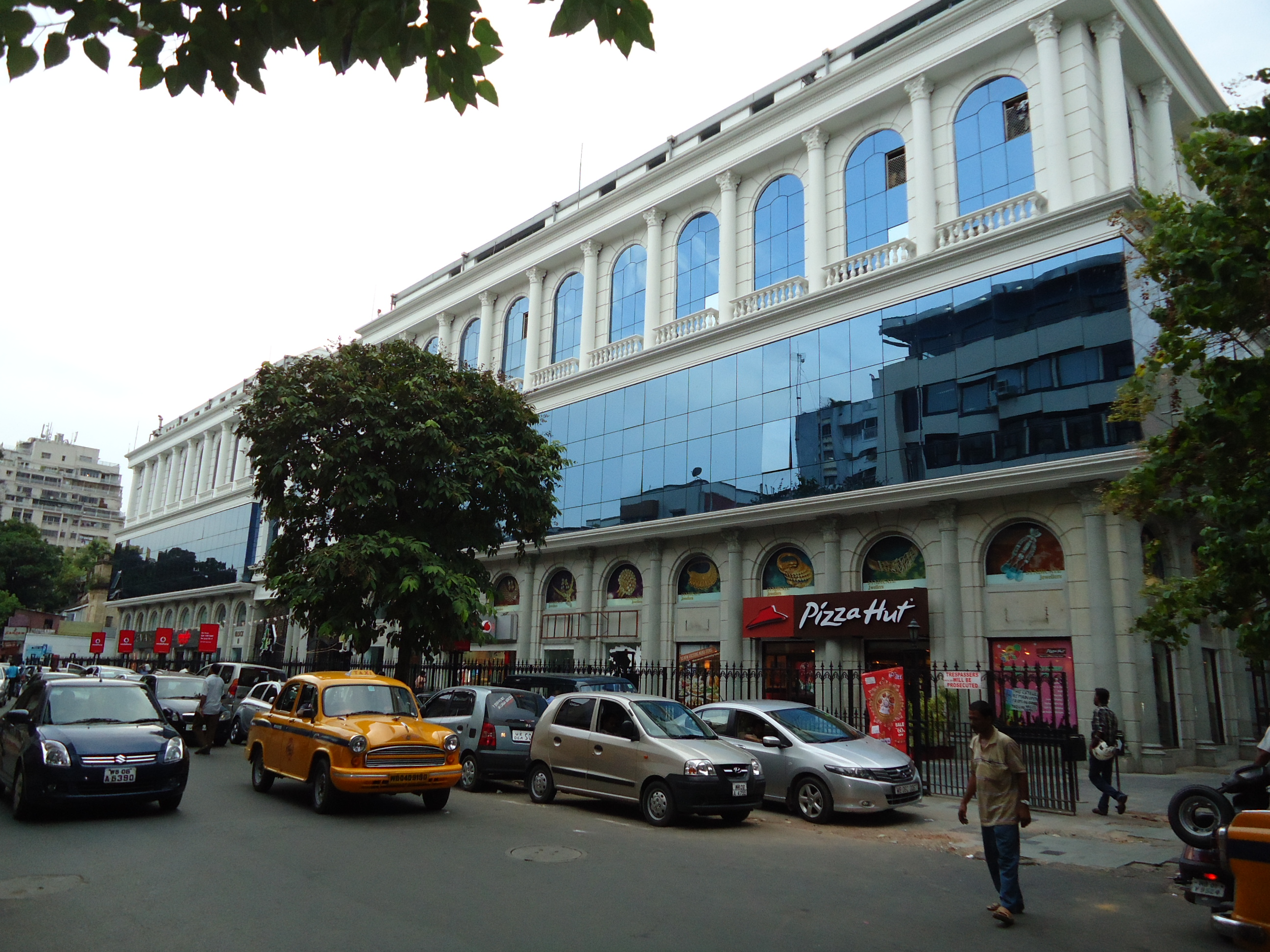
Camac Street, one of the CBD in Kolkata

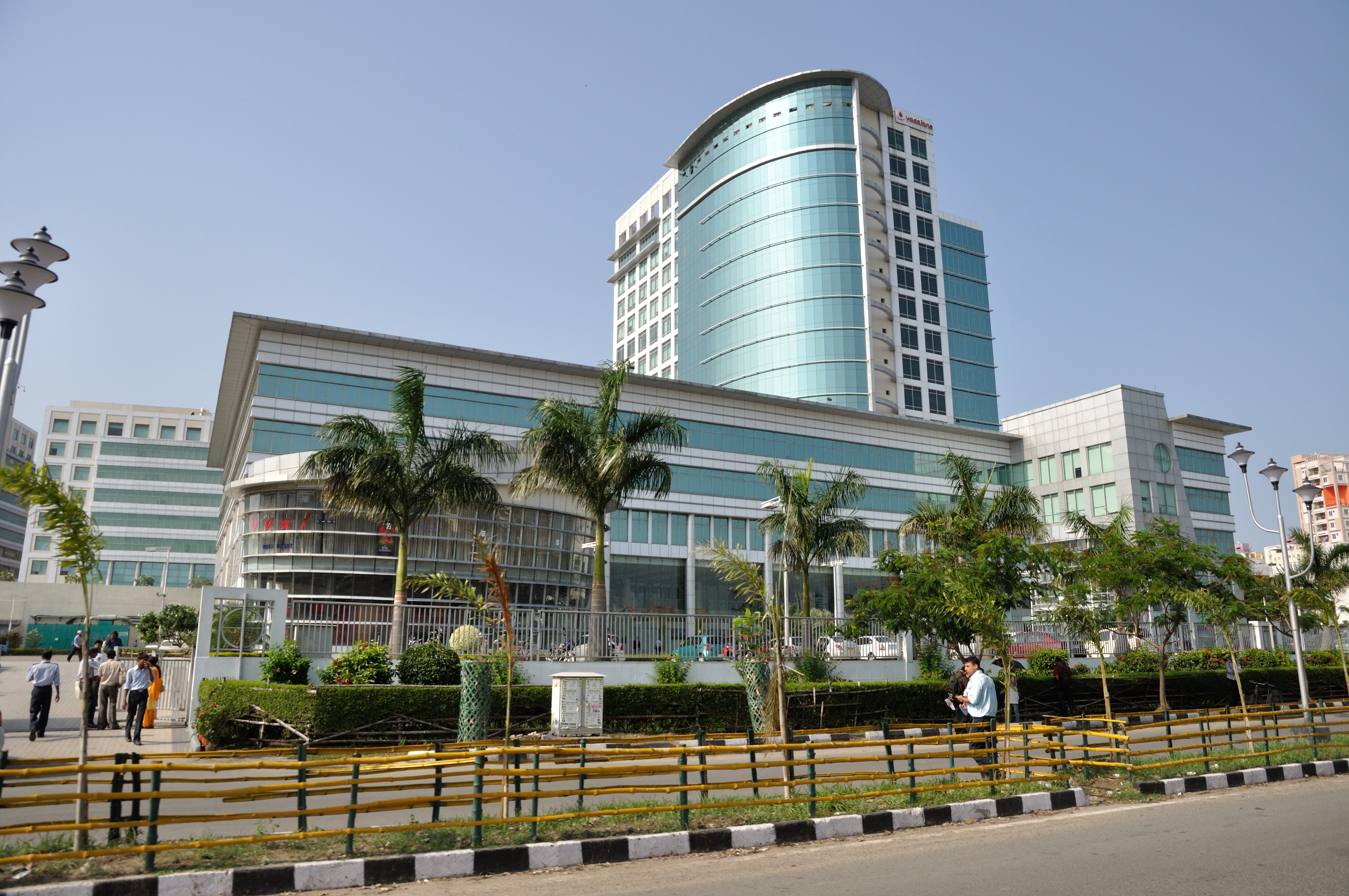
New Town, Kolkata, West Bengal

West Bengal's capital Kolkata (formerly, known as Calcutta), the capital of British India until 1911, is the biggest metropolis and economically dominant city of the region. It is also the main centre of commerce or the commercial capital of Eastern and North-Eastern India. Kolkata is very fast transforming itself to become city equipped with every facilities for IT and ITES and also financial outsourcing hub and its satellites Salt Lake and Rajarhat-New Town are taken the burdens of India's IT and financial boom. There are many Satellite towns also situated in Kolkata, some of them are Salt Lake, Rajarhat-New Town, Kolkata West International City, Kalyani, Calcutta Riverside. It is also known as City Of Joy.

West Bengal is the hub of industry and economic activities in Eastern India and it is also the home to the tallest skylines located in this region and are also one of the tallest buildings in the country. It is also the home of history of rising India.

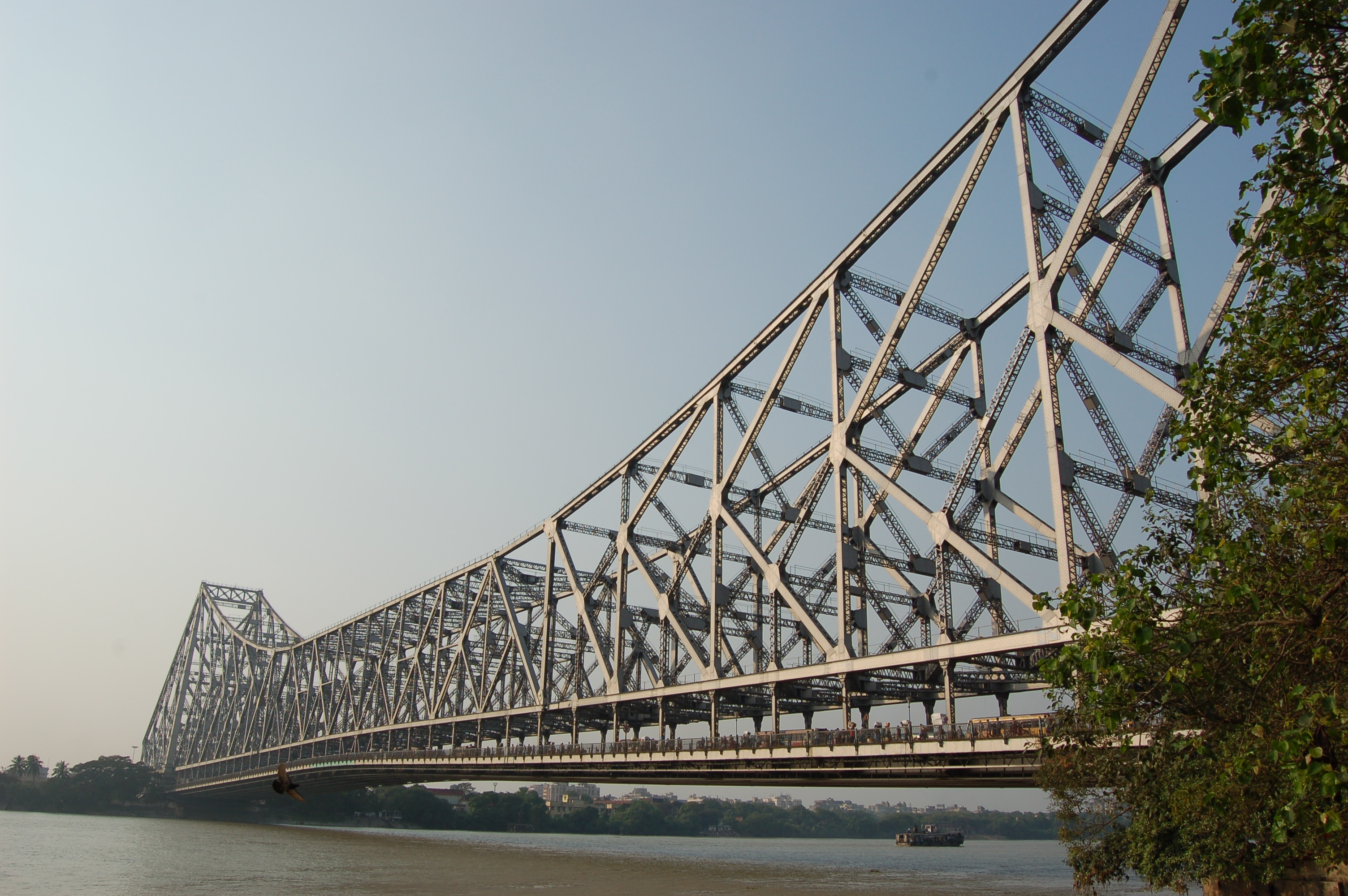
Howrah Bridge links Kolkata to Western bank of Ganges

The Kolkata metropolitan area is spread over 1,886.67 km^{2} (728.45 sq mi) and comprises 3 municipal corporations (including Kolkata Municipal Corporation), 39 local municipalities and 24 panchayat samitis, as of 2011. The urban agglomeration encompassed 72 cities and 527 towns and villages, as of 2006. Suburban areas in the Kolkata metropolitan area incorporate parts of the following districts: North 24 Parganas, South 24 Parganas, Howrah, Hooghly and Nadia. Kolkata, which is under the jurisdiction of the Kolkata Municipal Corporation (KMC), has an area of 185 km^{2} (71 sq mi). The east–west dimension of the city is comparatively narrow, stretching from the Hooghly River in the west to roughly the Eastern Metropolitan Bypass in the east—a span of 9–10 km (5.6–6.2 mi). The north–south distance is greater, and its axis is used to section the city into North, Central and South Kolkata.

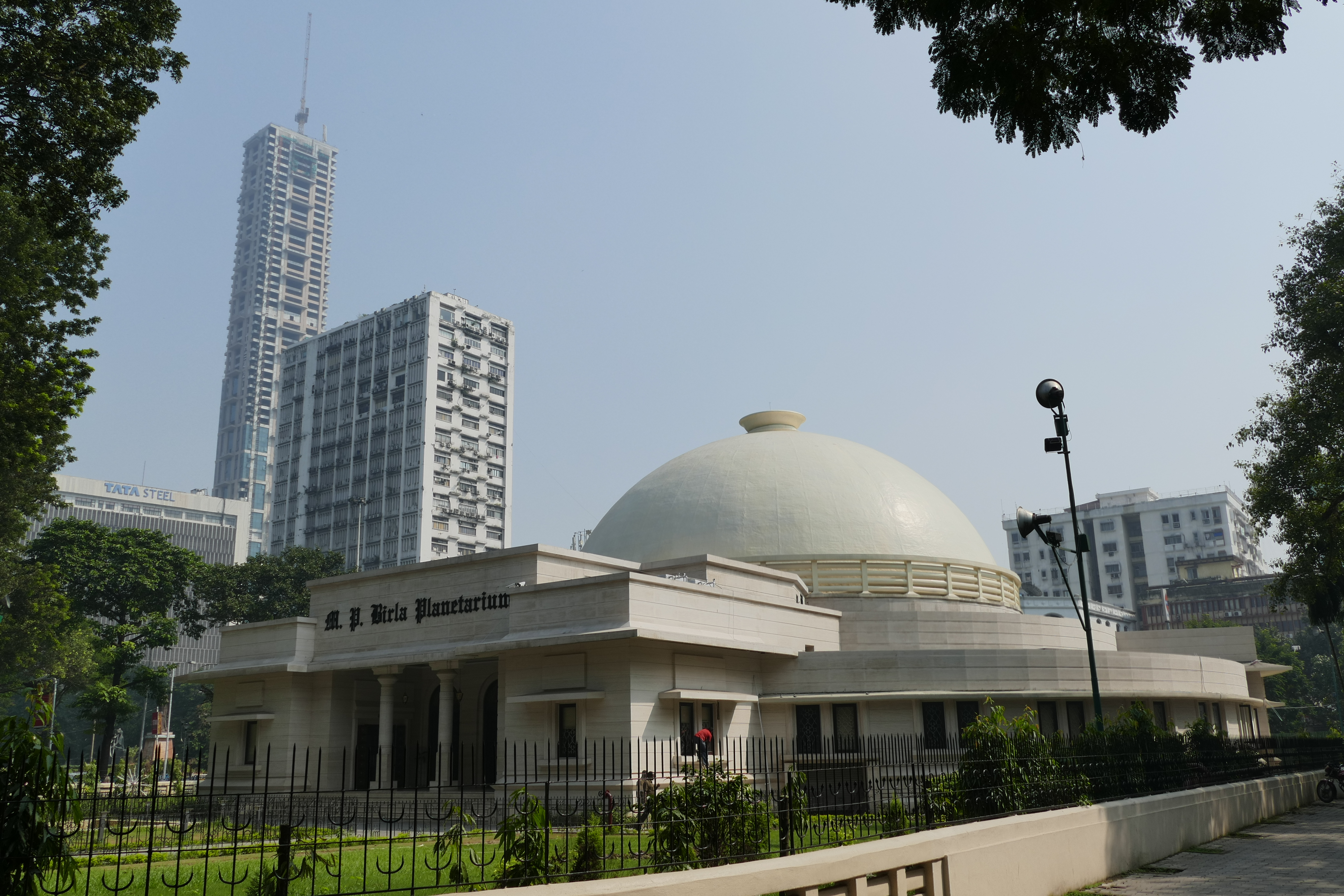
Kolkata skyline in 2017

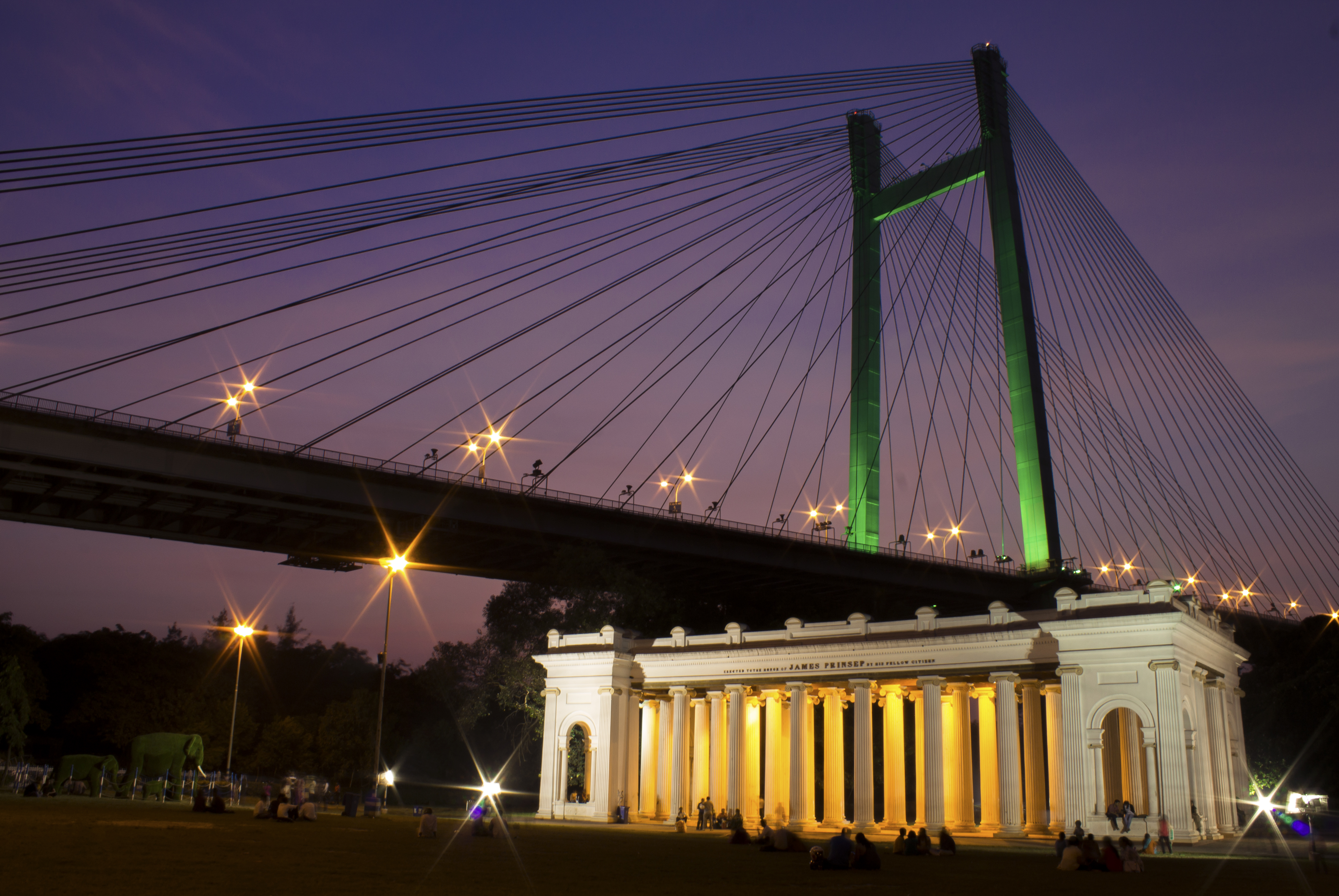
Vidyasagar Setu over Hooghly River

North Kolkata is the oldest part of the city. Characterised by 19th-century architecture and narrow alleyways, it includes areas such as Jorasanko, Maniktala, Ultadanga, Shyambazar, Shobhabazar, Bagbazar, Cossipore, Sinthee etc. The north suburban areas like Dum Dum, Baranagar, Belgharia, Sodepur, Khardaha, New Barrackpore, Madhyamgram, Barrackpore, Barasat etc. are also within the city of Kolkata (as a metropolitan structure).

Central Kolkata hosts the central business district. It contains B.B.D. Bagh, formerly known as Dalhousie Square and the Esplanade on its east; Strand Road is on its west. The West Bengal Secretariat, General Post Office, Reserve Bank of India, Calcutta High Court, Lalbazar Police Headquarters and several other government and private offices are located there. Another business hub is the area south of Park Street, which comprises thoroughfares such as Chowringhee Road, Camac Street, Wood Street, Loudon Street, Shakespeare Sarani, AJC Bose Road etc. The Maidan is a large open field in the heart of the city that has been called the "lungs of Kolkata" and accommodates sporting events and public meetings. The Victoria Memorial and Kolkata Race Course are located at the southern end of the Maidan. Among the other parks are Central Park in Bidhannagar and Millennium Park on Strand Road, along the Hooghly River.

South Kolkata includes many posh neighbourhoods such as Bhawanipore, Alipore, Ballygunge, Kasba, Dhakuria, Santoshpur, Garia, Tollygunge, Behala etc. The south suburban areas like Maheshtala, Budge Budge, Rajpur Sonarpur, Baruipur etc. are also within the city of Kolkata (as a metropolitan structure).

Asansol is the district headquarters of Paschim Bardhaman District in West Bengal. It is the second largest city in West Bengal after Kolkata and the 39th largest urban agglomeration in India. According to a 2010 report prepared by the International Institute for Environment and Development, a UK-based policy research non-governmental think tank, Asansol is ranked 11th among Indian cities. and 42nd in the world in its list of 100 fastest-growing cities. As per the recommendations of the Sixth Central Pay Commission, Asansol has been listed as a Y-category city for calculation of HRA (House Rent Allowance) for public servants. It is one of the three non-Z category cities in West Bengal apart from Kolkata, which belong to the X category making it a tier-II city. Durgapur is by far the most industrialised city in Eastern India and the second planned city in India. It started with the first prime minister of independent India, Jawaharlal Nehru. His dream of transforming the backward agricultural country into an industrially advanced nation was picked up in West Bengal by then Chief Minister Bidhan Chandra Roy. At the earlier stages for the selection of a proper site for a new industrial township. Modernist American architect Joseph Allen Stein, invited to head the newly formed Department of Architecture and Planning at the Bengal Engineering College in Calcutta, plunged into a major project as soon as he reached India in 1952 – the designing of Durgapur city with Benjamin Polk, another American architect already living in Calcutta. Thereafter it was the task of local leaders such as Ananda Gopal Mukherjee and bureaucrats such as K.K. Sen to get Durgapur going.

=== Bihar ===
Bihar has Patna, Bhagalpur, Darbhanga, Muzaffarpur, Gaya, Katihar and Purnia as important urban areas.

Patna is the capital of the Bihar, its most populous city and the second most populous city in Eastern India. It is the administrative, industrial and educational centre of the state. Patna is one of the oldest continuously inhabited places in the world. Ancient Patna, known as Pataliputra, was the capital of the Magadha Empire under the Haryanka, Nanda, Mauryan, Shunga, Gupta and Pala.

Pataliputra was a seat of learning and fine arts.

The modern city of Patna is situated on the southern bank of the Ganges. The city also straddles the rivers Sone, Gandak and Punpun. The city is approximately 35 km long and 16 km to 18 km wide. It is the second largest city of Eastern India.

In June 2009, the World Bank ranked Patna second in India (after Delhi) for ease of starting a business. As of 2004–2005, Patna had the highest per capita gross district domestic product in Bihar, at ₹ 63,063. Using fi gures for assumed average annual growth, Patna is the 21st fastest-growing city in the world and 5th fastest-growing city in India by the City Mayors' Foundation. Patna registered an average annual growth of 3.72% during 2006–2010. The city is also home to many tutorials and coaching institutes who prepare students for various entrance exams. IIT NIT NIFT AIIMS and other leading educational institutions are running successfully in Patna. City is also developing excellent road infrastructure to boom its economy. Ganga expressway and elevated corridors are under some of the ongoing projects in the city. A world class museum is also on its way to completion. The old museum of the city will be replaced by one of the biggest mall in east India. Patna Metro rail corporations is also going to start soon by 2021. It would be the second metro railway in Eastern India after Kolkata and the third in North India after Delhi and Lucknow.

IT parks are also developing in and around the city.

Patna recorded a per capita of Rs 63,063. The per capita level for 2007 was higher than Bangalore or Hyderabad, which are both leading centres for global software development.

The Buddhist, Hindu, and Jain pilgrim centres of Vaishali, Rajgir, Nalanda, Gaya, Bodhgaya, and Pawapuri are nearby and Patna is also a sacred city for Sikhs as the last Sikh Guru, Guru Gobind Singh, was born here.

=== Odisha ===
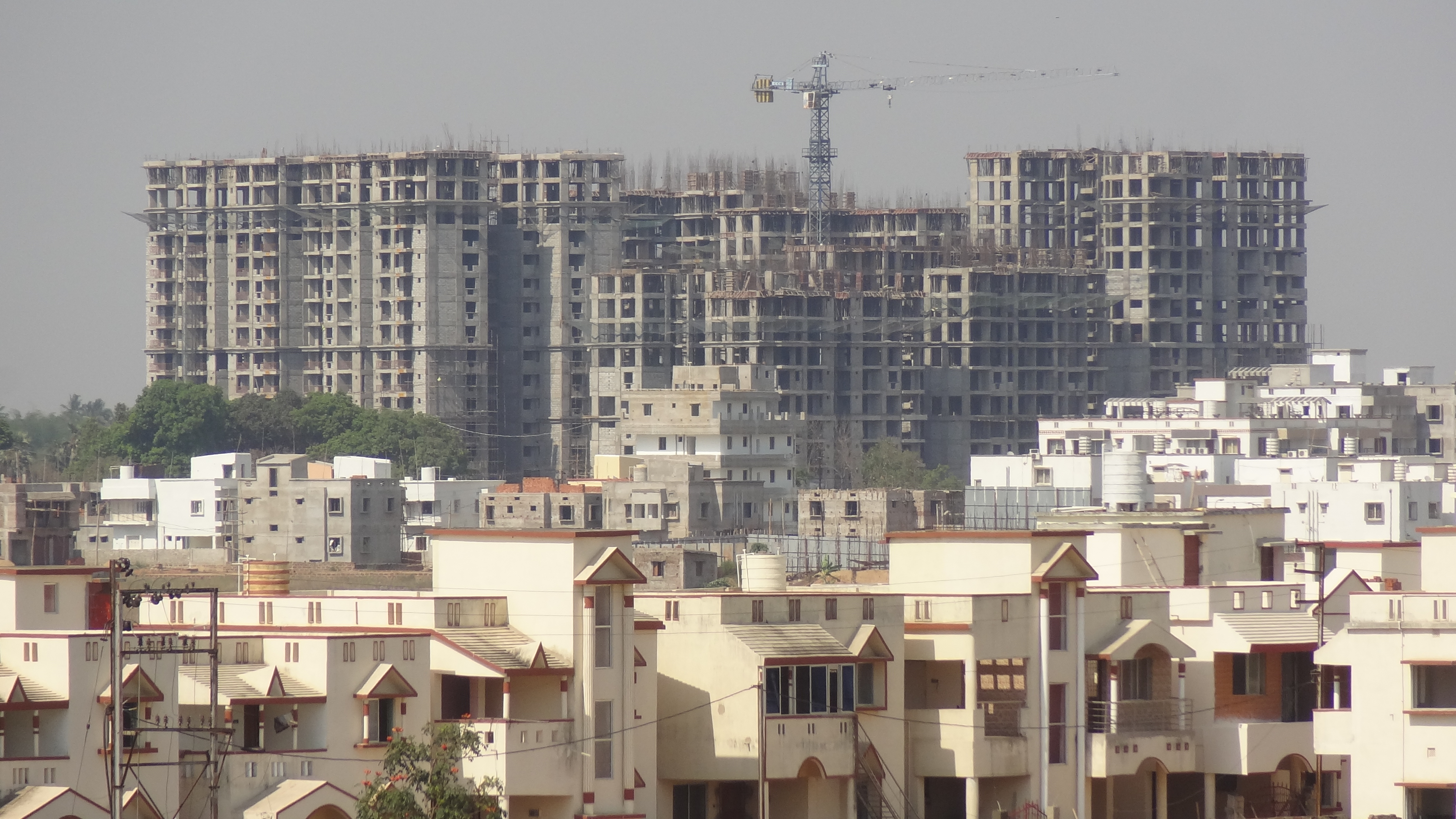
Skyscrapers in Bhubaneswar city

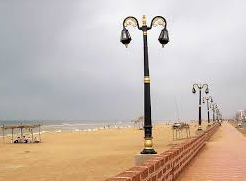
Puri sea beach

Bhubaneswar is the capital of the Odisha. Other Important Cities are Cuttack, Brahmapur, Rourkela, Paradeep, Jajpur, Bhadrak, Balasore, Sambalpur and Puri. The Capital city has a long history of over 2000 years starting with Chedi dynasty (around the 2nd century BCE) who had Sisupalgarh near present-day Bhubaneswar as their capital. Historically, Bhubaneswar has been known by different names such as Toshali, Kalinga Nagari, Nagar Kalinga, Ekamra Kanan, Ekamra Kshetra and Mandira Malini Nagari (city of temples) or the temple city of India. The largest city of Odisha, Bhubaneswar today is a center of economic and religious importance in the region. With the economic liberalisation policy adopted by the Government of India in the '90s, Bhubaneswar received large investments in the fields of telecommunications, IT and higher education, particularly in science and engineering. The city is home to around 60 engineering colleges (as of 2009) and the number is growing every year. The city is also home to many tutorials and coaching institutes who prepare students for various entrance exams.

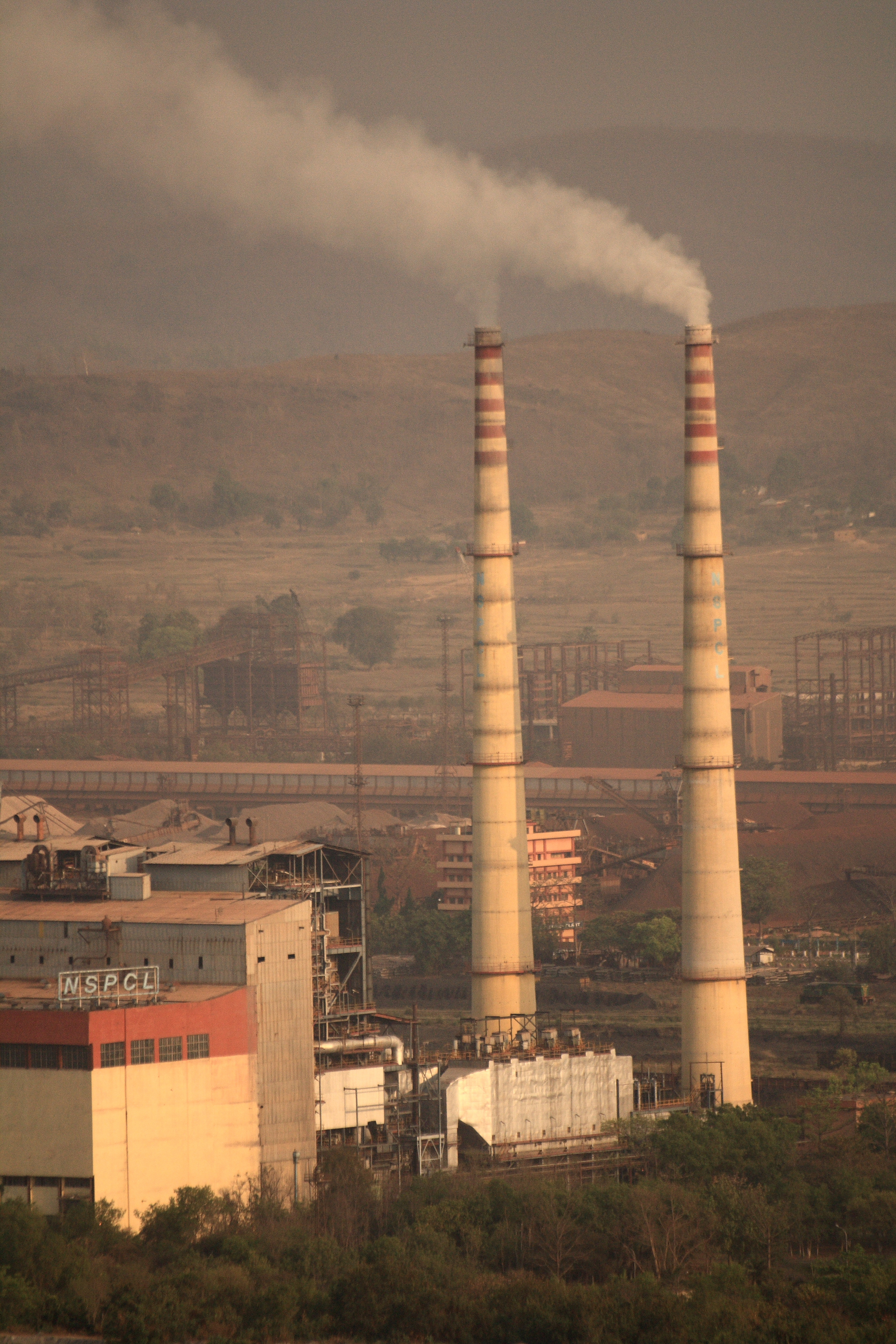
Rourkela Steel Plant

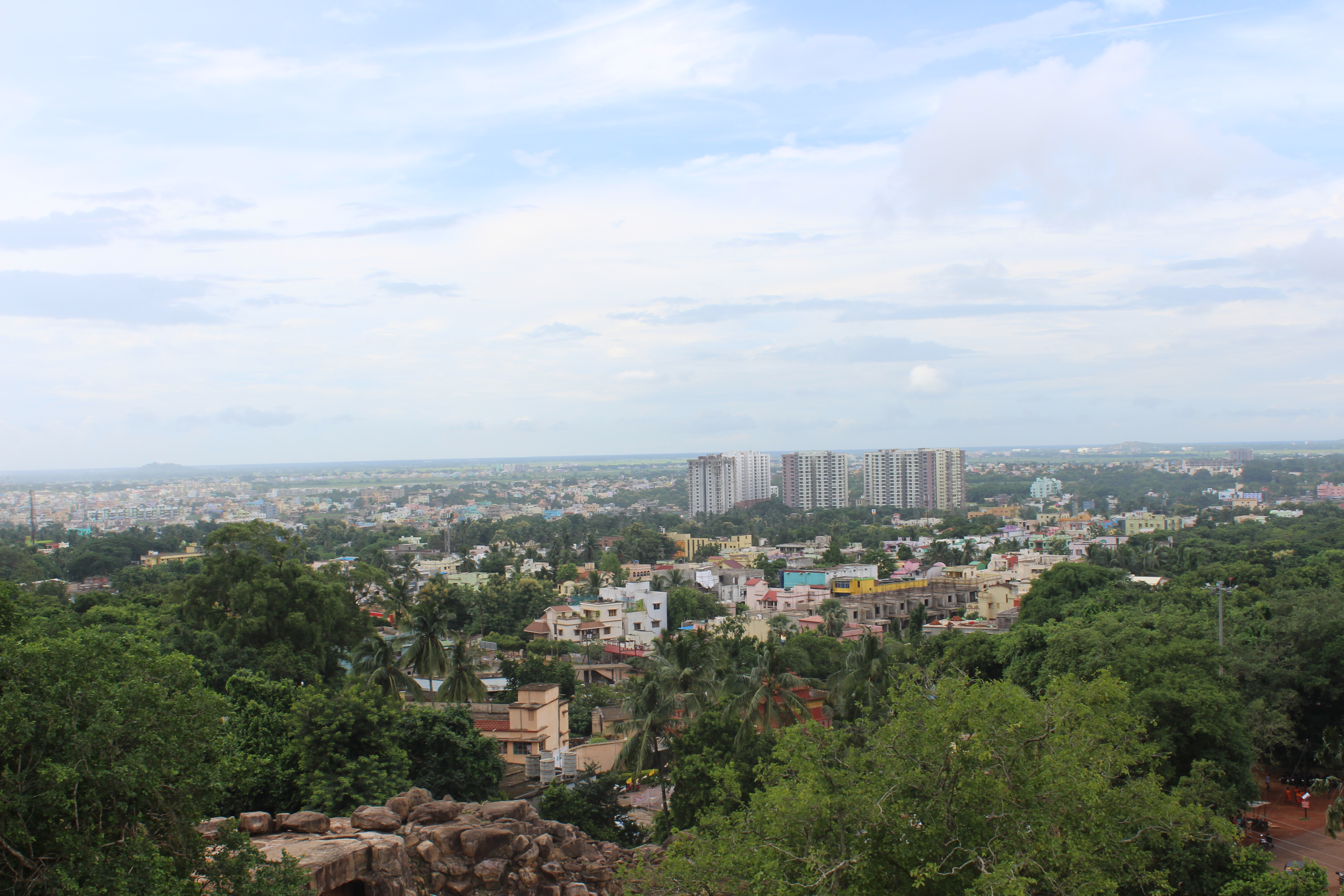
Bhubaneswar skyline

Retail and Real Estate have also emerged as big players. Recent times have seen large scale retail chains such as Reliance, Vishal MegaMart, Big Bazaar, Pantaloon, Pal Heights, Indulge, New Leaf, Habib's, had opened outlets in Bhubaneswar. Large corporations like DLF Universal and Reliance Industries have entered the real estate market in the city. DLF Limited is developing an Infopark spread over an area of 54 acres (220,000 m^{2}) in the city. Expanding its business portfolio, the Kolkata-based Saraf Group, promoters of Forum Mart shopping malls is constructing another Shopping mall named Forum Lifestyle mall a 550,000 sq ft (51,000 m^{2}) lifestyle mall in Bhubaneswar with 1,200 car parks. The rich minerals resources of Odisha have been the backbone of the economy dominated by Government. Steel Authority of India Limited (SAIL) and private organisations like Jindal, Vedanta and TATAS. Despite this rapid growth, an ample number of the populace live in slums. Migration from rural areas, especially from the northern districts of Andhra Pradesh, has led to the growth of slums which are a major challenge to the city's growth.

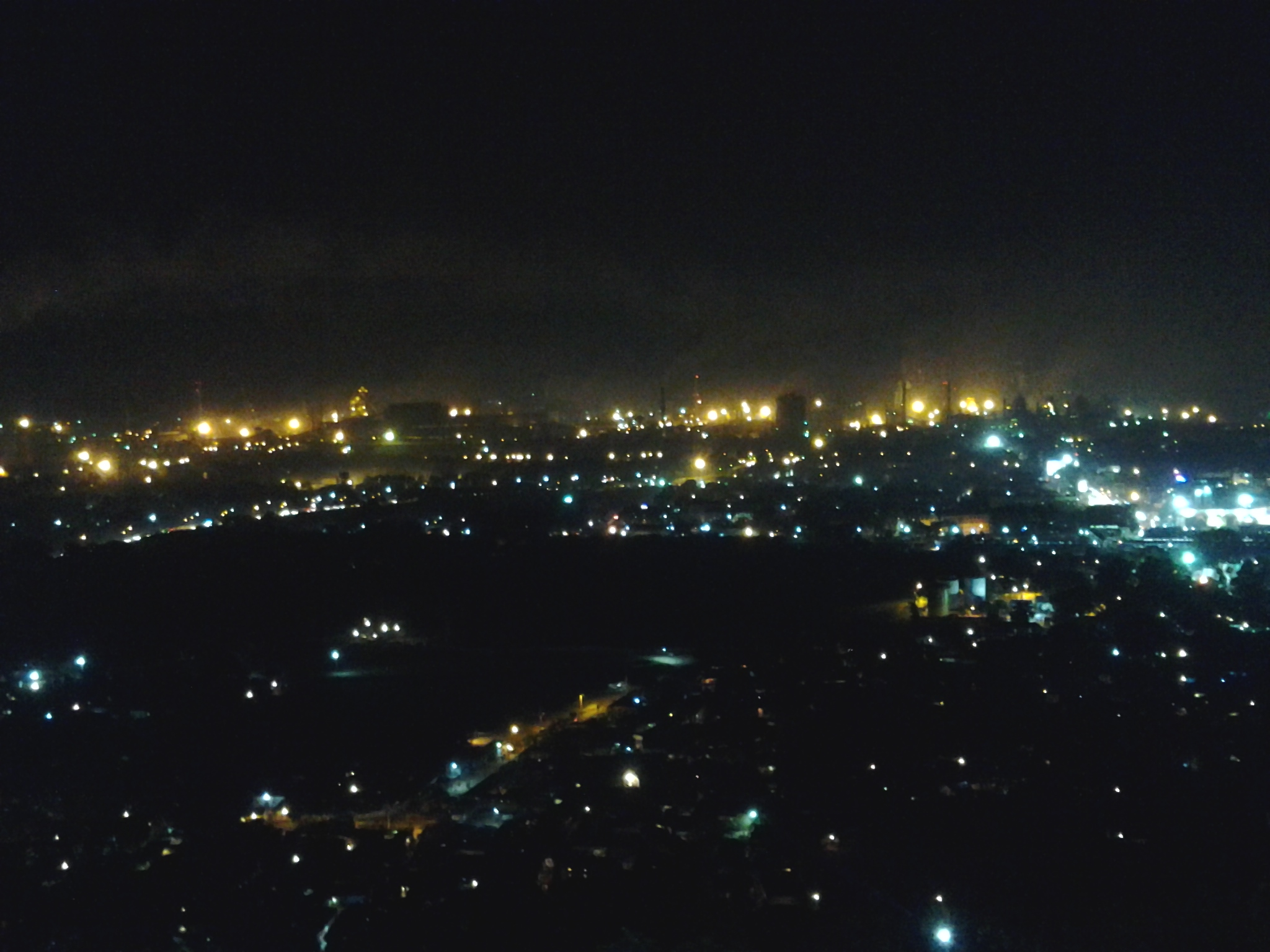
Rourkela at night

The Government has fostered growth in this sphere by the development of IT Parks such as Infocity 1 and the new Infocity 2. The Info City was conceived as a five star park, under the Export Promotion Industrial Parks (EPIP) Scheme to create high quality infrastructure facilities for setting up Information Technology related industries. Infosys and Satyam Computer Services Ltd. have been present in Bhubaneswar since 1996–97. Its current head count stands at around 5000. The first part of the TCS centre is ready and has a capacity to accommodate nearly 1,200 professionals but the software major has only 250 employees at present. The Finland telecommunication company, Nethawk, has its India R&D center at Bhubaneswar. The Canadian giant, Gennum Corporation has its India development centre at Bhubaneswar. The auditors Price water house Coopers Pvt. Ltd. also has a center in Bhubaneswar. The private STP is located at Infocity in Chandaka, Bhubaneswar with a view to provide incubation and infrastructure facilities to new and young entrepreneurs in the MSME sector, The intelligent building of the JSS STP is spread in a sprawling 3-acre (12,000 m^{2}) campus and houses state-of-art technology to fulfil the growing demands of highly competent IT professionals.

The Eastern India, particularly Odisha and Jharkhand, have rich mineral resources which resulted in economic boom in these two states. Several mineral based industries have been established in many cities of Odisha and Jharkhand namely Kalinganagar, Angul, Paradeep, Talcher, Rourkela, Damanjodi, Joda, Barbil, Choudwar, Jharsuguda Jamshedpur, Bokaro, Dhanbad and Ranchi.

== Demographics ==
=== Languages ===
Languages of East India (2011)
1. Hindi (40.2%)
2. Bengali (30.8%)
3. Odia (13.1%)
4. Maithili (4.89%)
5. Urdu (4.83%)
6. Santali (2.59%)
7. Others (3.64%)

Bengali is the dominant language of West Bengal and Andaman and Nicobar Islands. Hindi, Bhojpuri, Maithili, Magahi and Urdu are the dominant languages of Bihar. Hindi, Santali, Khortha and Nagpuri are the dominant language of Jharkhand; however, some tribals speak their own tribal languages. Jharkhand has accorded second language status to Angika, Bengali, Bhojpuri, Ho, Kharia, Kurukh, Khortha, Kurmali, Magahi, Maithili, Mundari, Nagpuri, Odia, Santali and Urdu. Odia is the dominant language of Odisha. Odia got classical language status in 2014 while Bengali got classical language status in 2024.

The Indo-Aryan languages spoken in this region descend from the Magadhi Prakrit, which was spoken in the ancient kingdom of Magadha. Odia emerged as a distinct language from Odra Prakrit while Maithili emerged around the 9th century CE.

Many of the minority tribal languages of East India belong to the Munda branch of the Austroasiatic language family and Dravidian language family. Major representatives of Munda languages include the Mundari, Santali, and Ho. Dravidian languages include Kurukh, Kui and Pengo.

=== Religion ===
About 80% of the population of East India is Hindu with significant Muslim and small Christian, Buddhist and tribal minorities. The Muslims constitute a very large minority in West Bengal with 27% of the population and 17% in Bihar. Hindus form 94% of total population of Odisha. Christians are the largest minority in Odisha with 3% of the state population.

Durga, Krishna, Jagannath and Shiva are particularly popular Hindu deities in this region. Durga and Kali are patron deities of Bengal and Mithila whereas Jagannath or Vishnu is patron god among Odia people. Rama and Hanuman are most revered in Bihar. Shiva is popular in all areas of eastern states.

Among tribals of the region Hinduism is the dominant religion. Some tribals also follow their indigenous religions (Sarana). There are several places of pilgrimage for Hinduism. Puri in Odisha is one of the four holy City/Dham of Hindu religion and particularly known for Rath Yatra festival. Bhubaneswar is considered to be the "City of Temples". Konark houses an old sun temple.

Bihar Sharif is an important pilgrimage centre for some Muslims nearby and from other places.

In Bihar Village Harinagar Bajrang Bali temple is famous for Hindu people.

Dakshineswar Kali Temple is a historical Kali temple in West Bengal. Kalighat Kali Temple in Kolkata is the most important of all Shakta pithas in India. Belur Math in Kolkata is the headquarters of the Ramkrishna Mission founded by Swami Vivekananda.

In Bihar, Gaya is known for temple for salvation of ancestors. Other places are Sultanganj in Bhagalpur and Vaidyanath Jyotirlinga in Deoghar, Jharkhand. Bodh Gaya is the city sacred to Buddhism. There are also other cities sacred to Jains in Bihar and Jharkhand.

== Climate ==
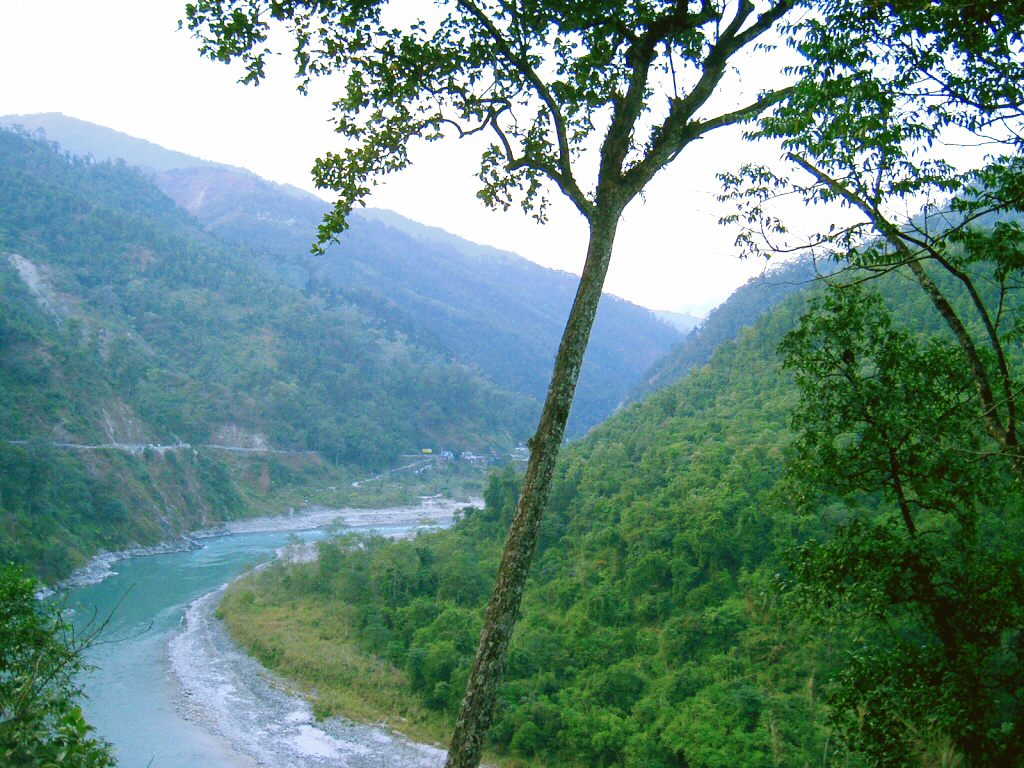
National Highway 31A winds along the banks of the Teesta River near Kalimpong, in the Darjeeling Himalayan hill region in West Bengal.

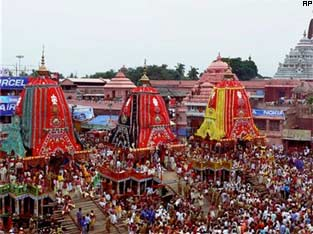
Puri rath yatra, Odisha

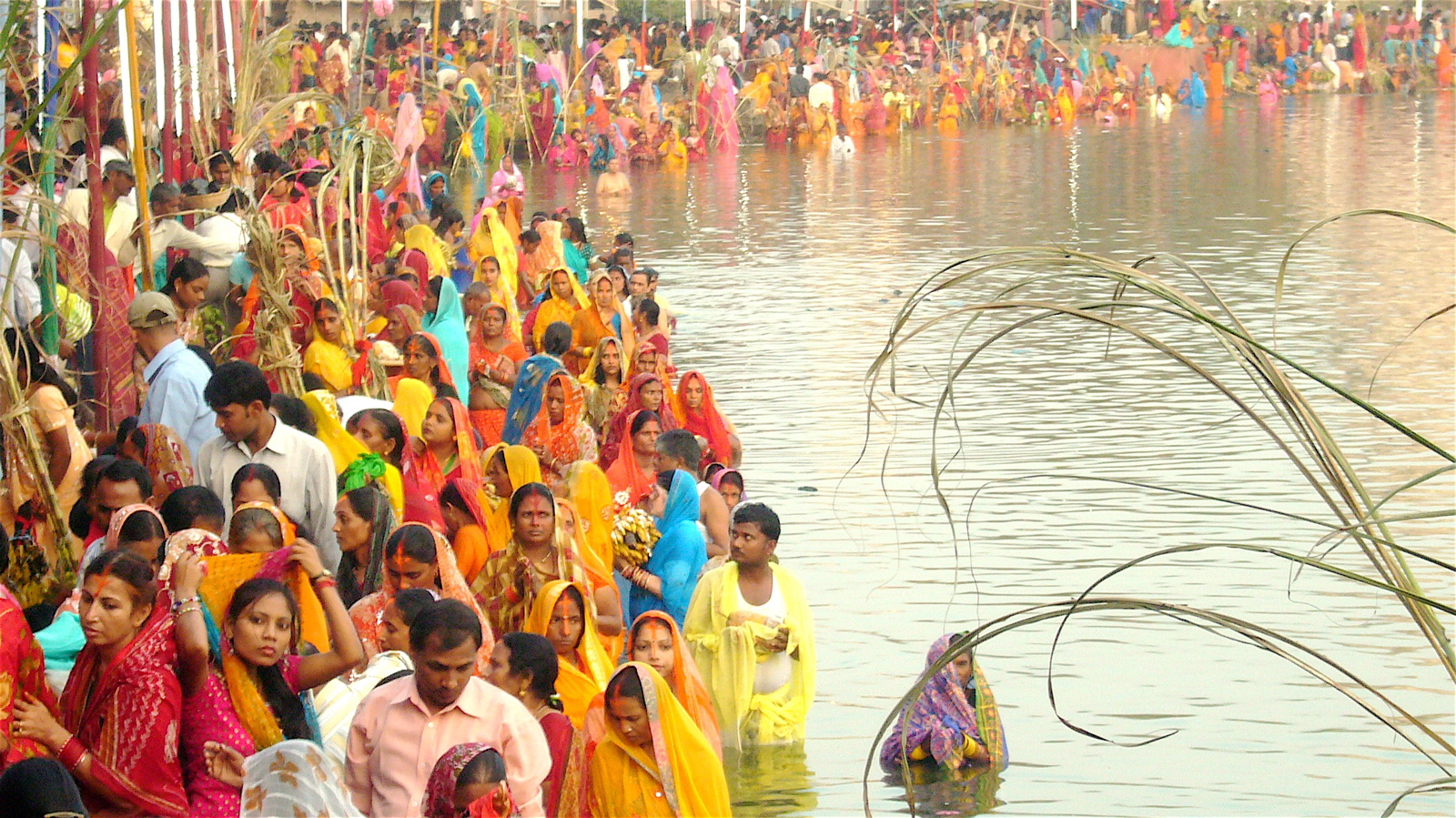
Chhath Puja

The region lies in the humid-subtropical zone, and experiences hot summers from March to June, the monsoon from July to October and mild winters from November to February. The interior states have a drier climate and slightly more extreme climate, especially during the winters and summers, but the whole region receives heavy, sustained rainfall during the monsoon months. Snowfall occurs in the extreme northern regions of West Bengal and Daringbadi in Odisha

== Culture ==
=== Notable people ===
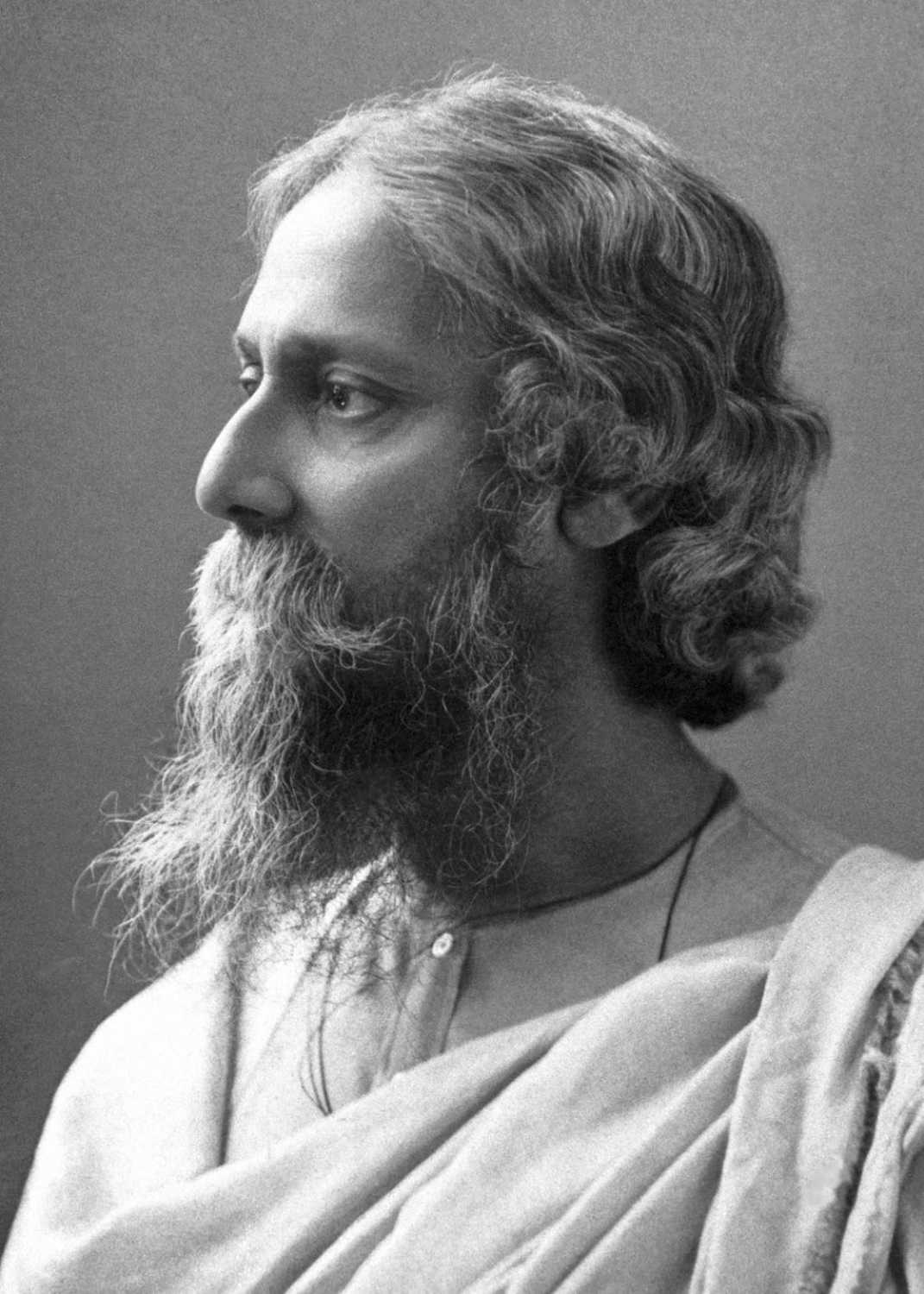
Rabindranath Tagore is Asia's first Nobel laureate and composer of India's national anthem

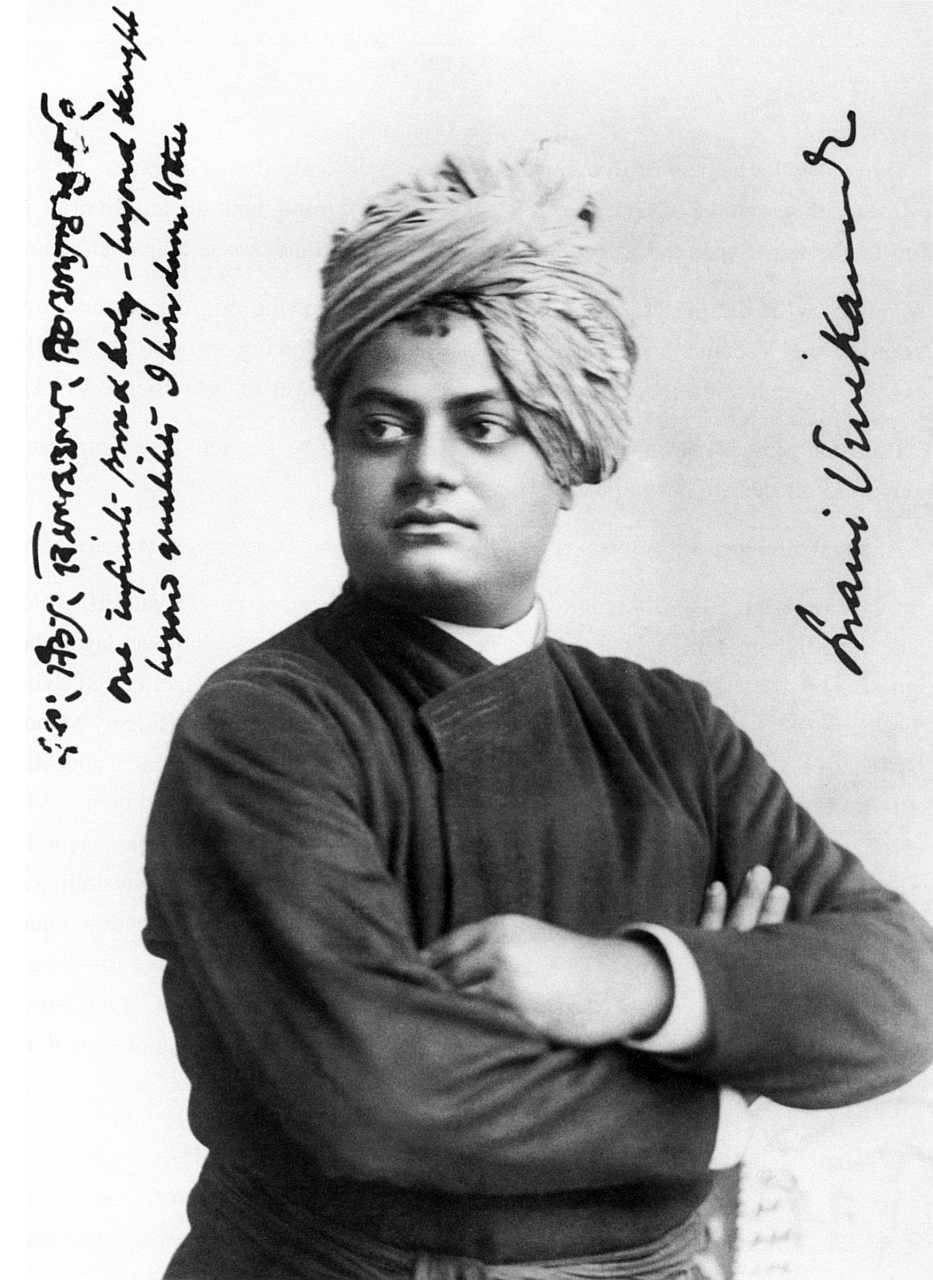
Swami Vivekananda was a key figure in introducing Vedanta and Yoga in Europe and USA, raising interfaith awareness and making Hinduism a world religion.

=== Cuisine ===
Bengali food has inherited a large number of influences, both foreign and pan-Indian, arising from a historical and strong trade links with many parts of the world. Bengal fell under the sway of various Turkic rulers from the early thirteenth century onwards, and was then governed by the British for two centuries (1757–1947).

Odisha

Odia cuisine refers to the cooking of the eastern Indian state of Odisha. Foods from this area are rich and varied, while relying heavily on local ingredients. The flavours are usually subtle and delicately spiced, quite unlike the fiery curries typically associated with Indian cuisine. Fish and other seafood such as crab and shrimp are popular. Chicken and mutton are also consumed, but somewhat occasionally. Only 6% of the population of Odisha is vegetarian, and this is reflected in its cuisine. The oil base used is mostly mustard oil, but in festivals ghee is used. Panch phutana, a mix of cumin, mustard, fennel, fenugreek and kalonji (nigella) is widely used for tempering vegetables and dals, while garam masala (curry powder) and haladi (turmeric) are commonly used for non-vegetarian curries. Pakhala, a dish made of rice, water, and yogurt, that is fermented overnight, is very popular in summer, particularly in the rural areas. Oriyas are very fond of sweets and no Oriya repast is considered complete without some dessert at the end. Festivals and fasts witness a cuisine without onion and garlic, whereas other days witness an aroma of garlic and onion paste in curries. One can find restaurants serving food without onion and garlic in major places like Puri and other coastal area, which is run by Brahmin owners.

Odisha has a culinary tradition spanning centuries if not millennia. The kitchen of the Jagannath temple in Puri is reputed to be the largest in the world, with a thousand cooks, working around 752 wood-burning clay hearths called chuli, to feed over 10,000 people every day.

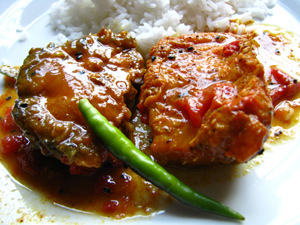
A traditional Bengali and Odia fish meal – Rice with Macher Jhol/Machha Jhola (Literally translated to "Fish's gravy")

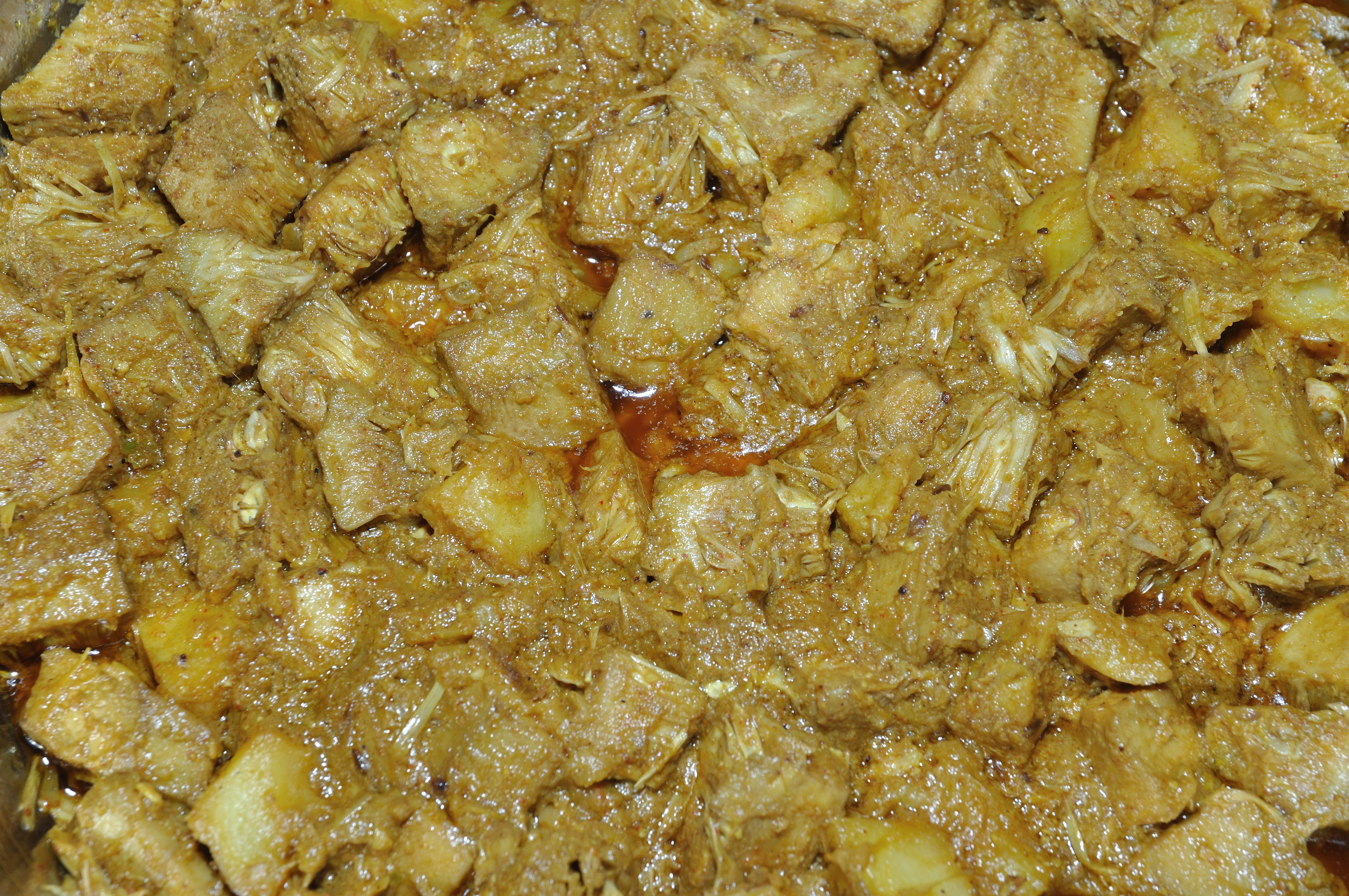
Green jackfruit and potato curry, Kolkata

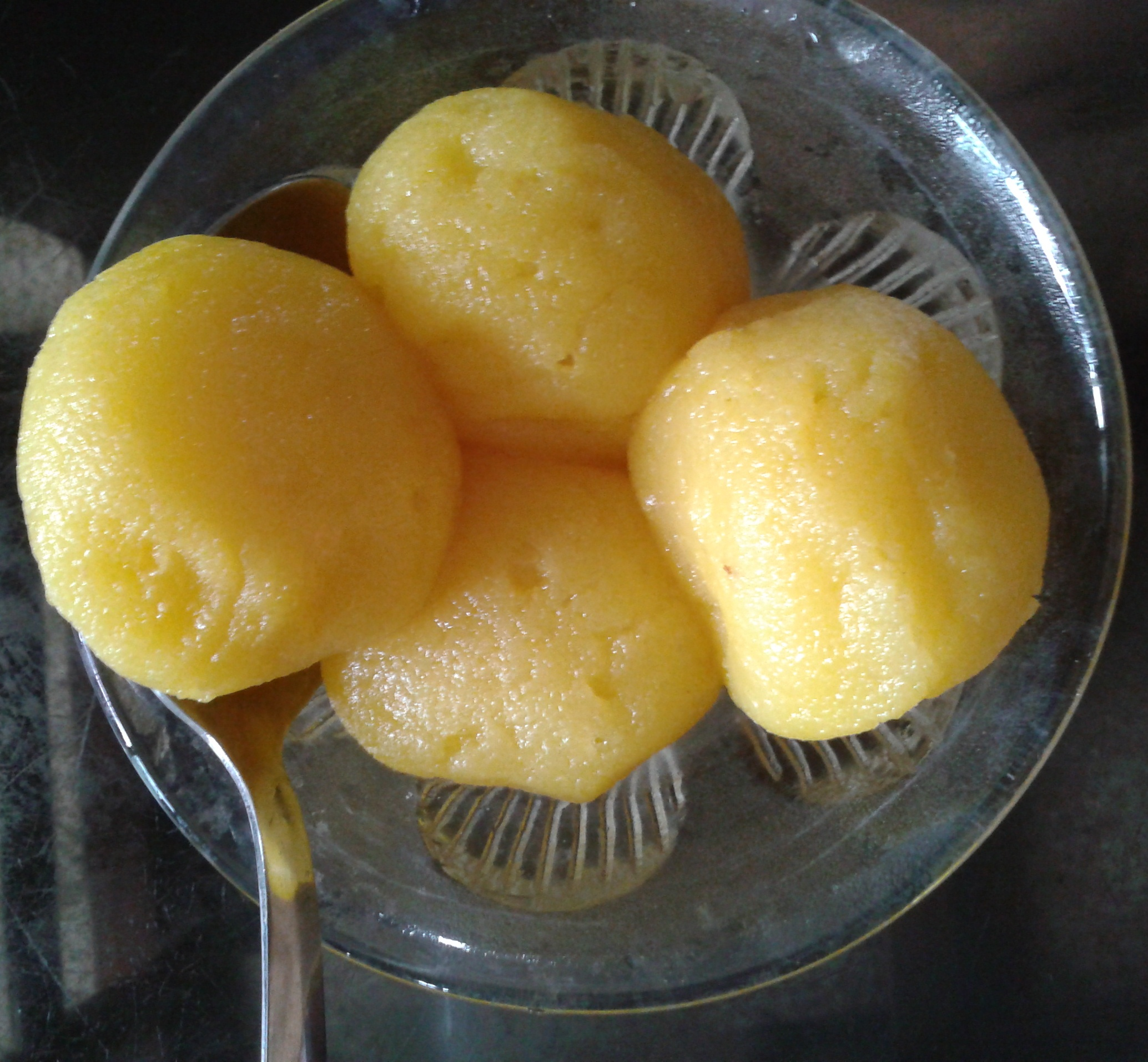
Kamalabhog Roshogolla from West Bengal

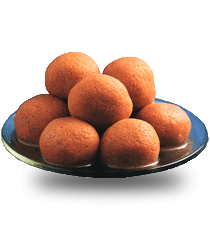
Bikali Kar Rasagola from Odisha

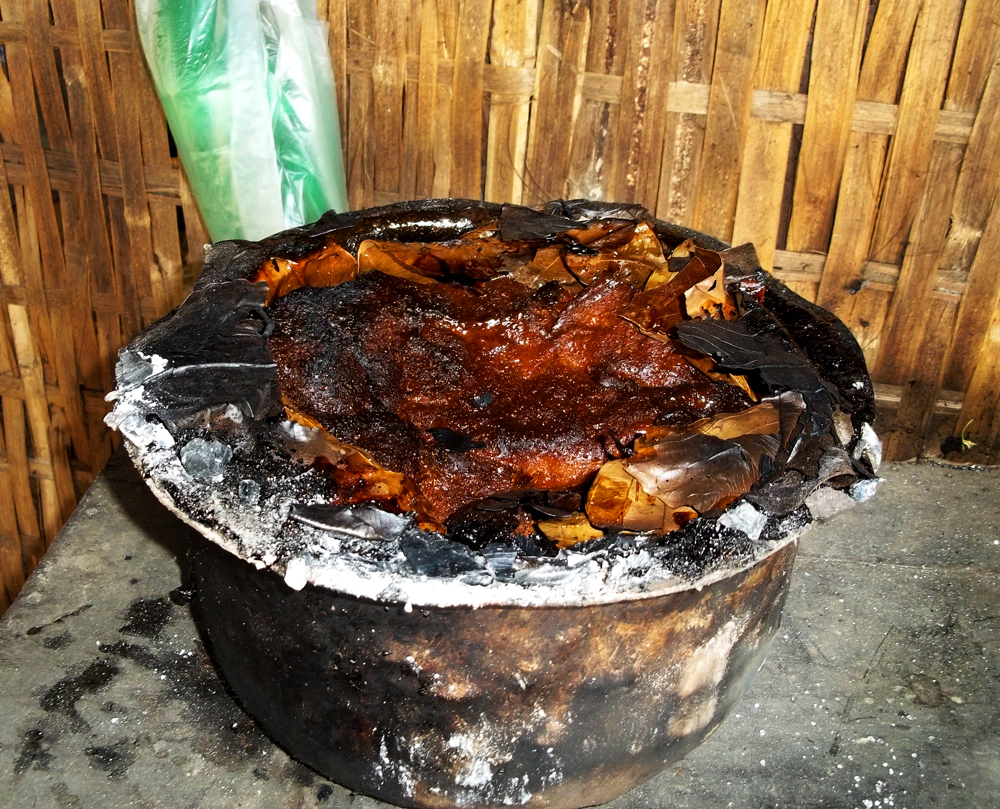
Chhena Poda from Odisha

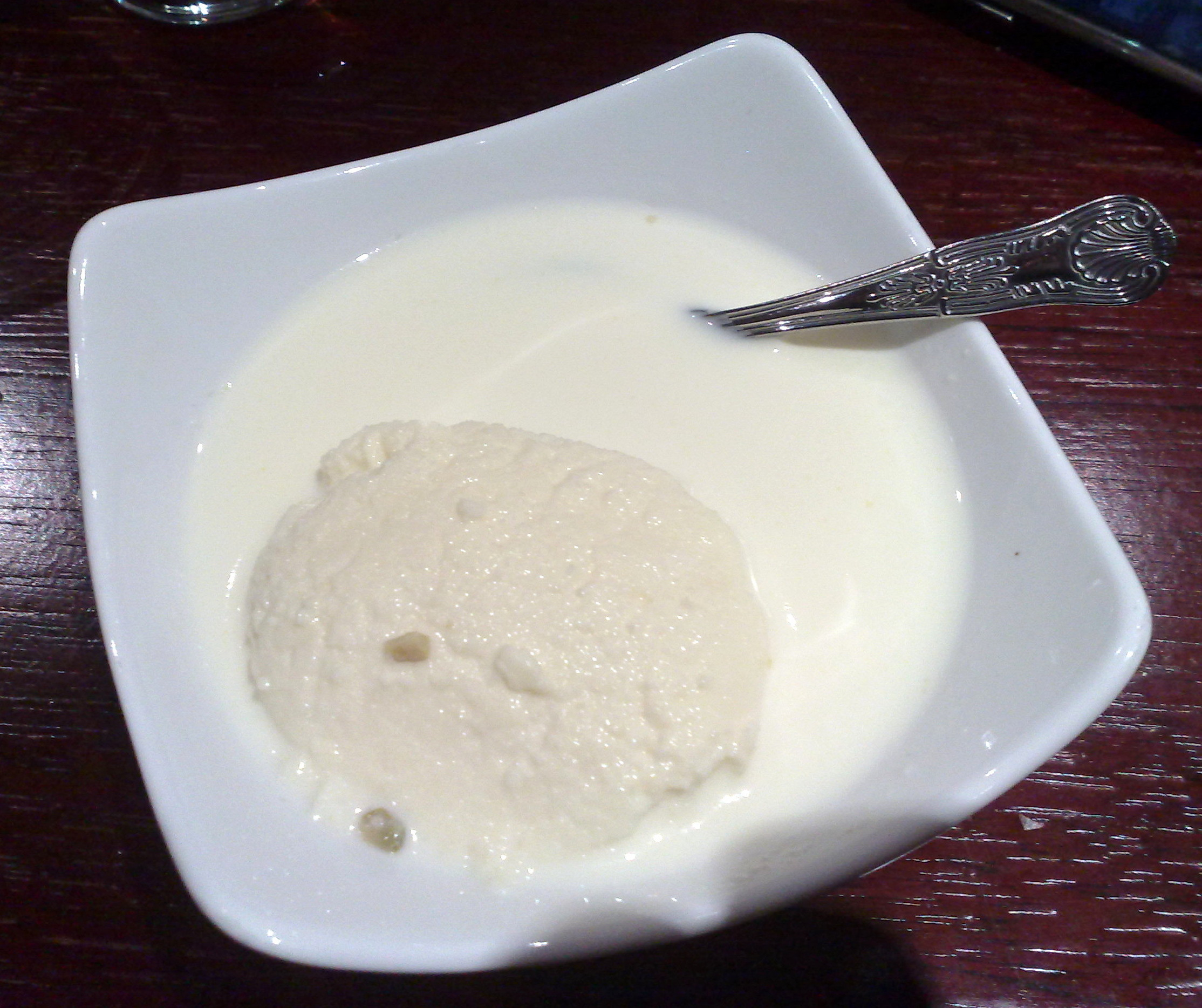
Rasmalai, a sweet dish popular in Odisha and West Bengal

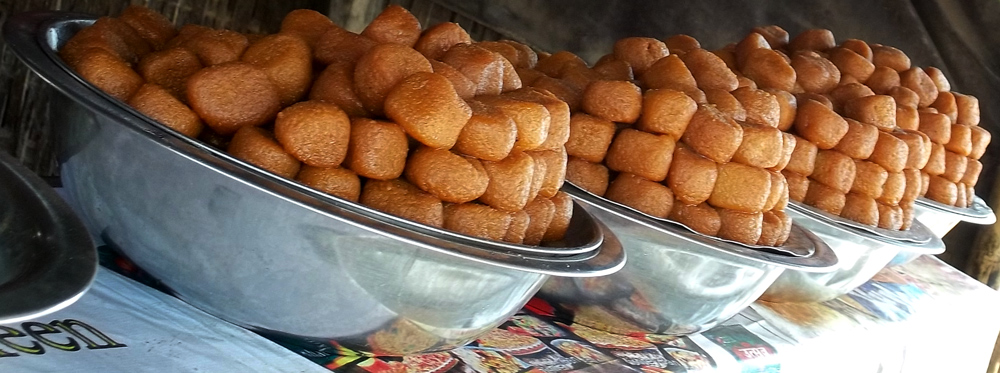
Chhena Gaja from Odisha

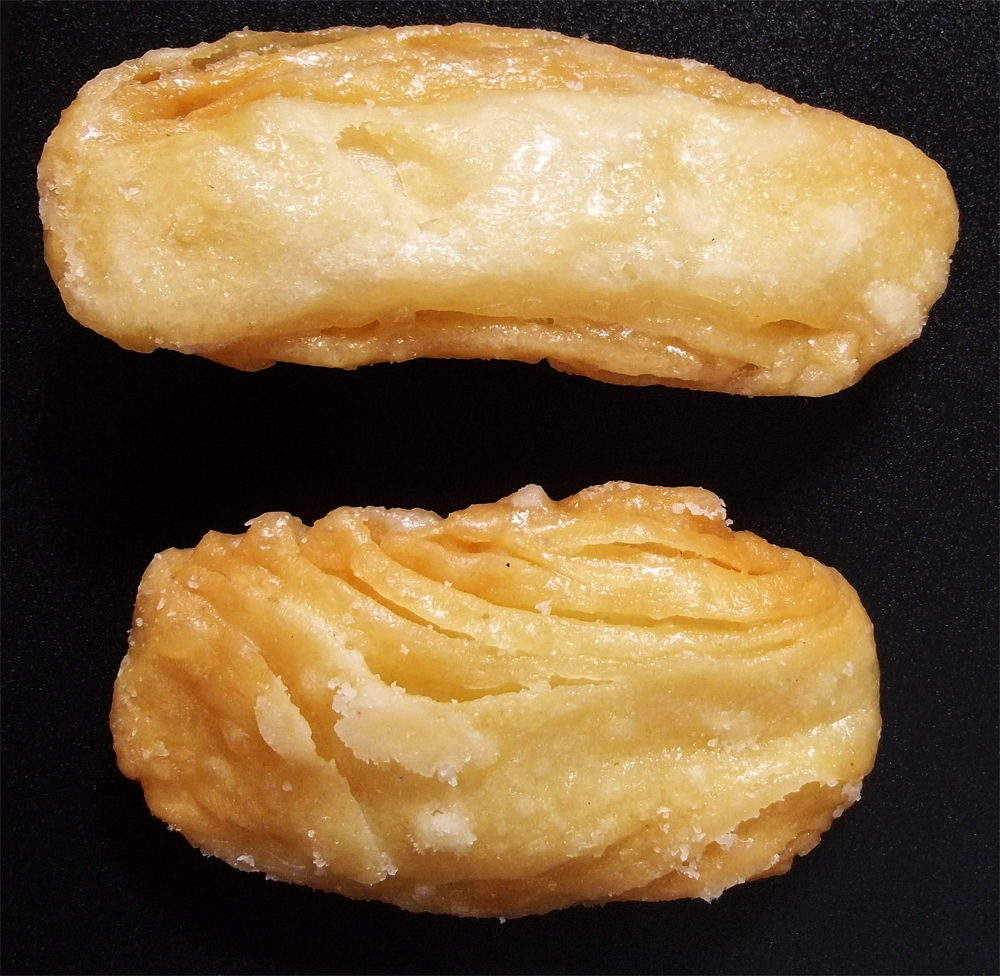
Khaja, a sweet dish popular in Bihar, Odisha and West Bengal

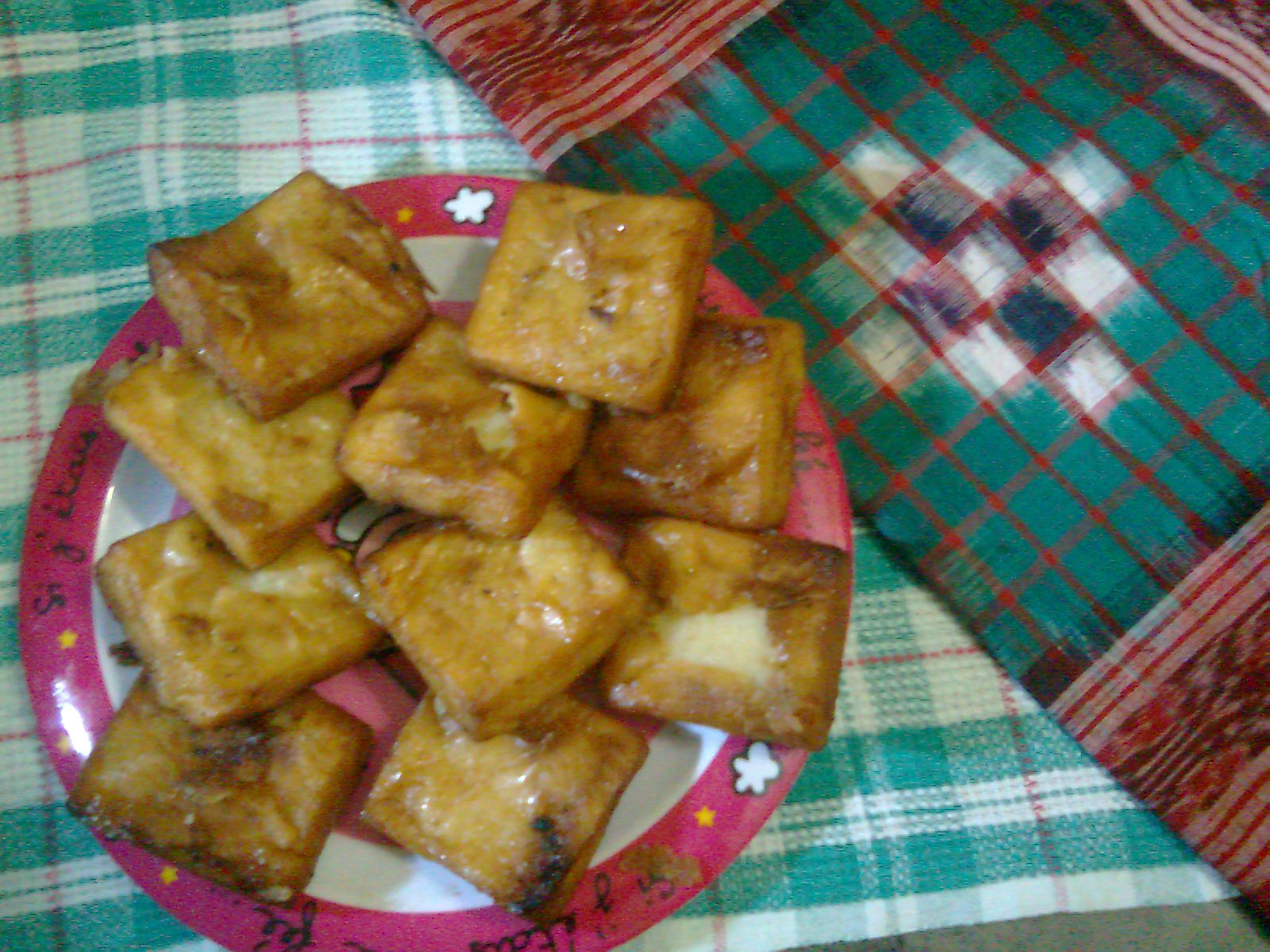
Chandrakanti sweet from Odisha

Bihar

Bihari cuisine is eaten mainly in Bihar, as well as regions where Bihari people have settled namely, Jharkhand, eastern Uttar Pradesh, Bangladesh, Nepal, Mauritius, South Africa, Fiji, some cities of Pakistan, Guyana, Trinidad and Tobago, Suriname, Jamaica and the Caribbean. Bihari cuisine includes Bhojpuri cuisine, Maithil cuisine and Magahi cuisine.

=== Dance ===
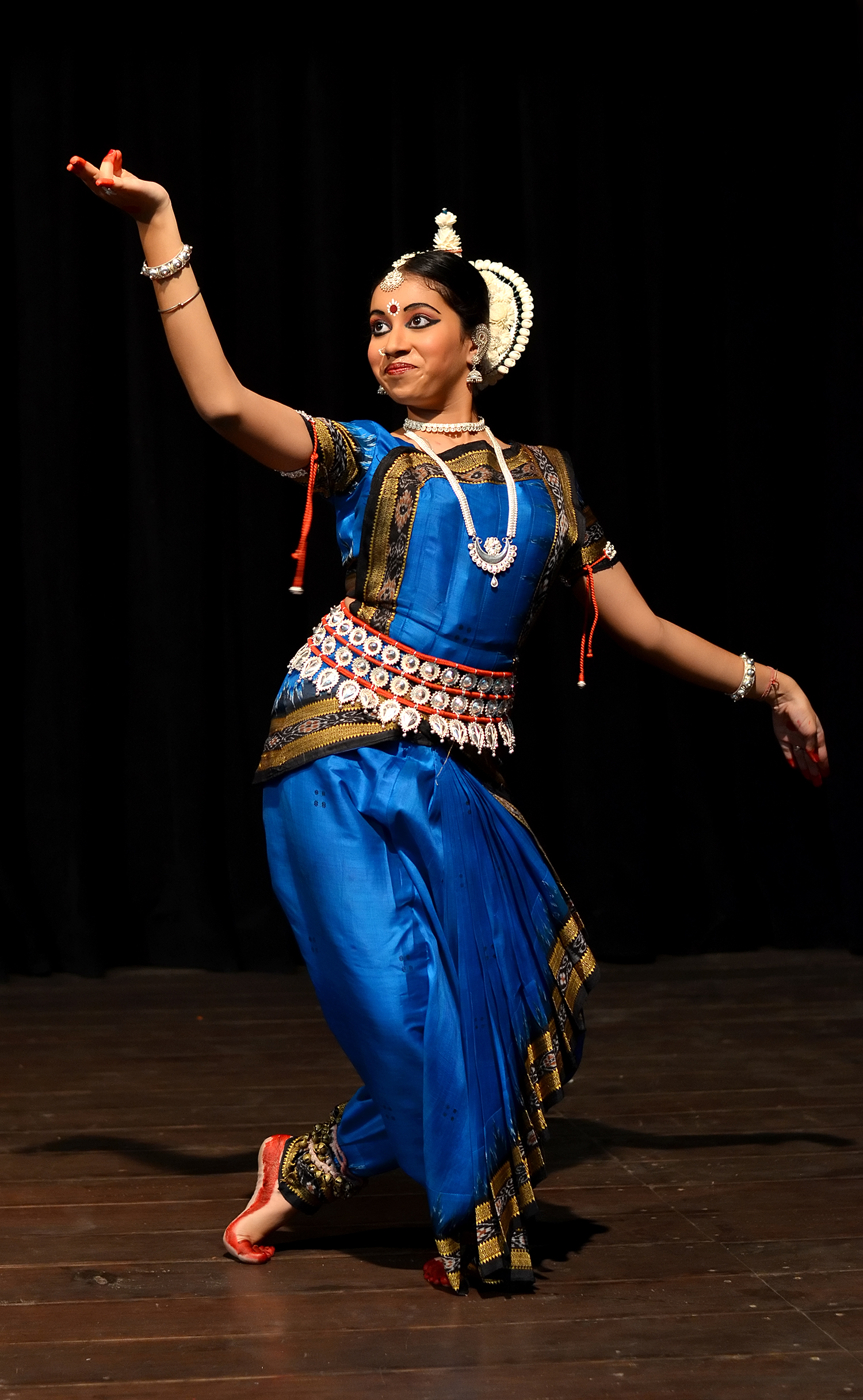
Performing Odissi, a classical dance from Odisha

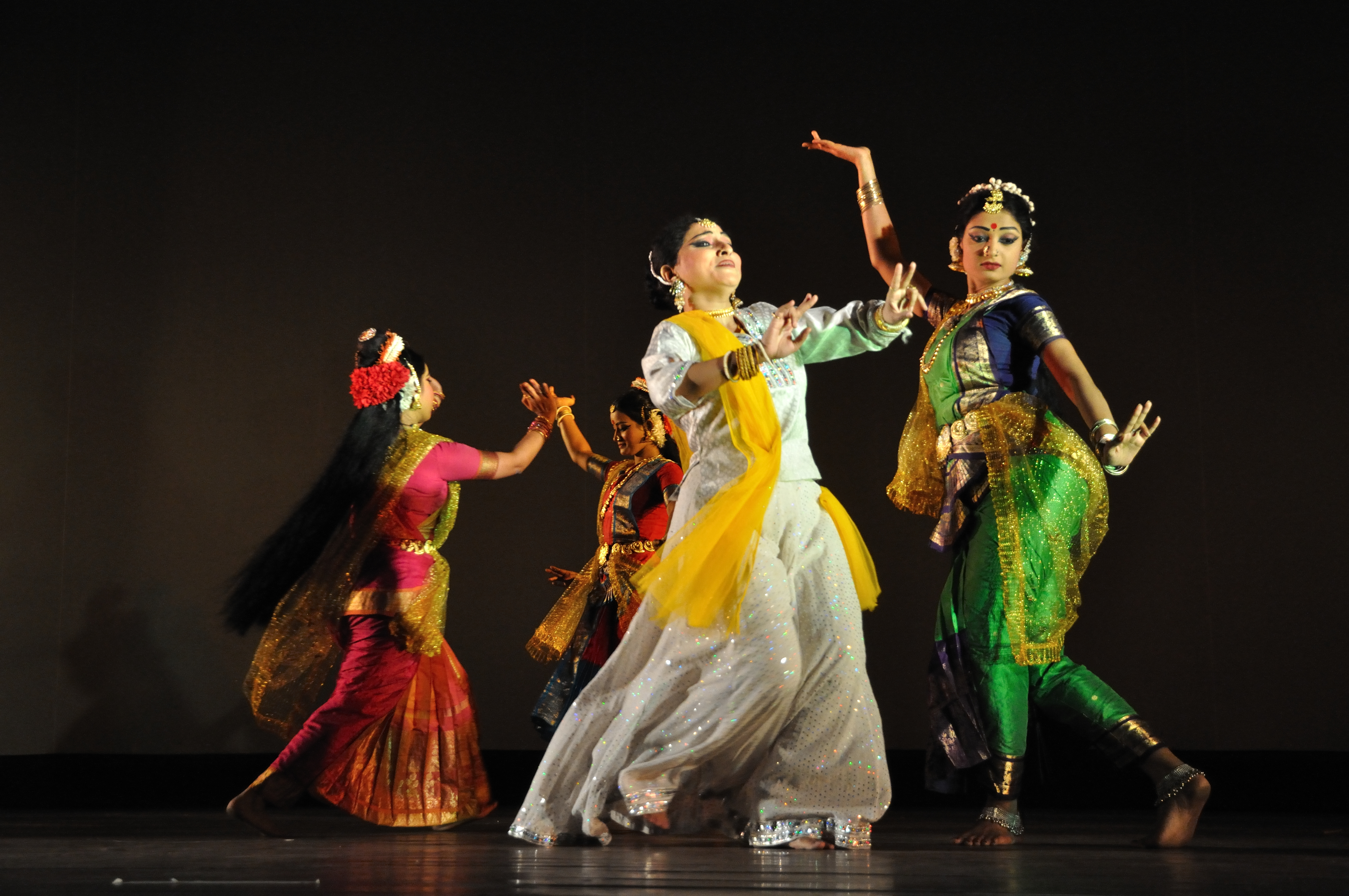
Dance accompanied by Rabindra Sangeet

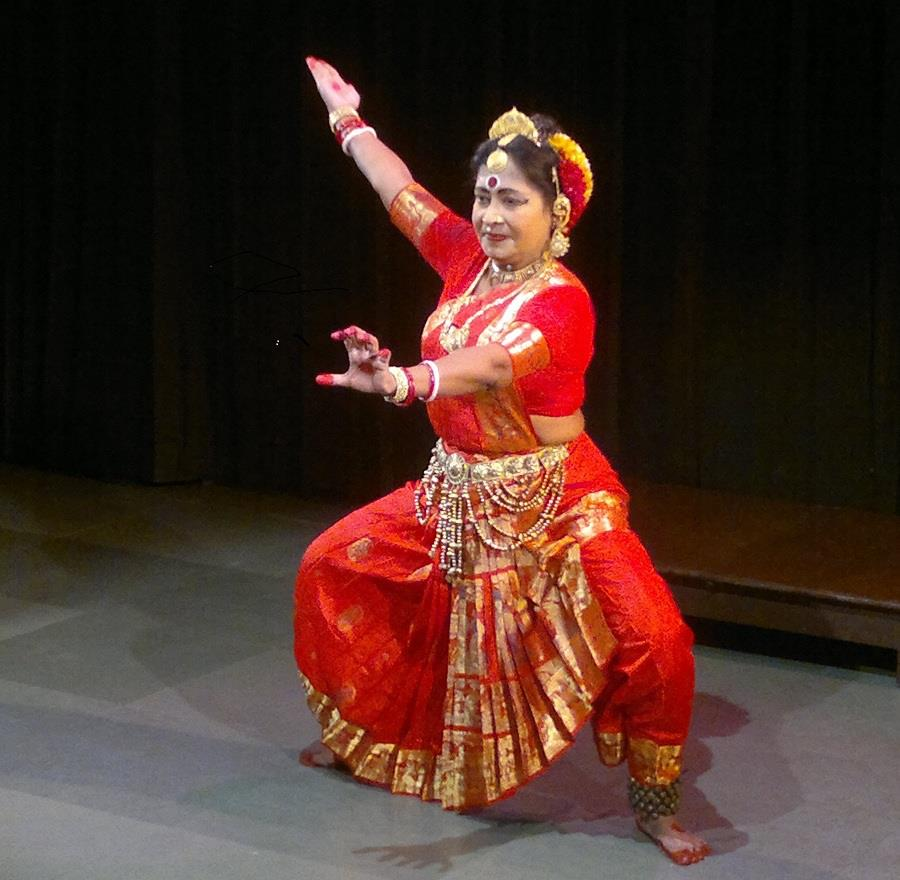
Performance of Gaudiya Nritya, a classical dance form of Bengal

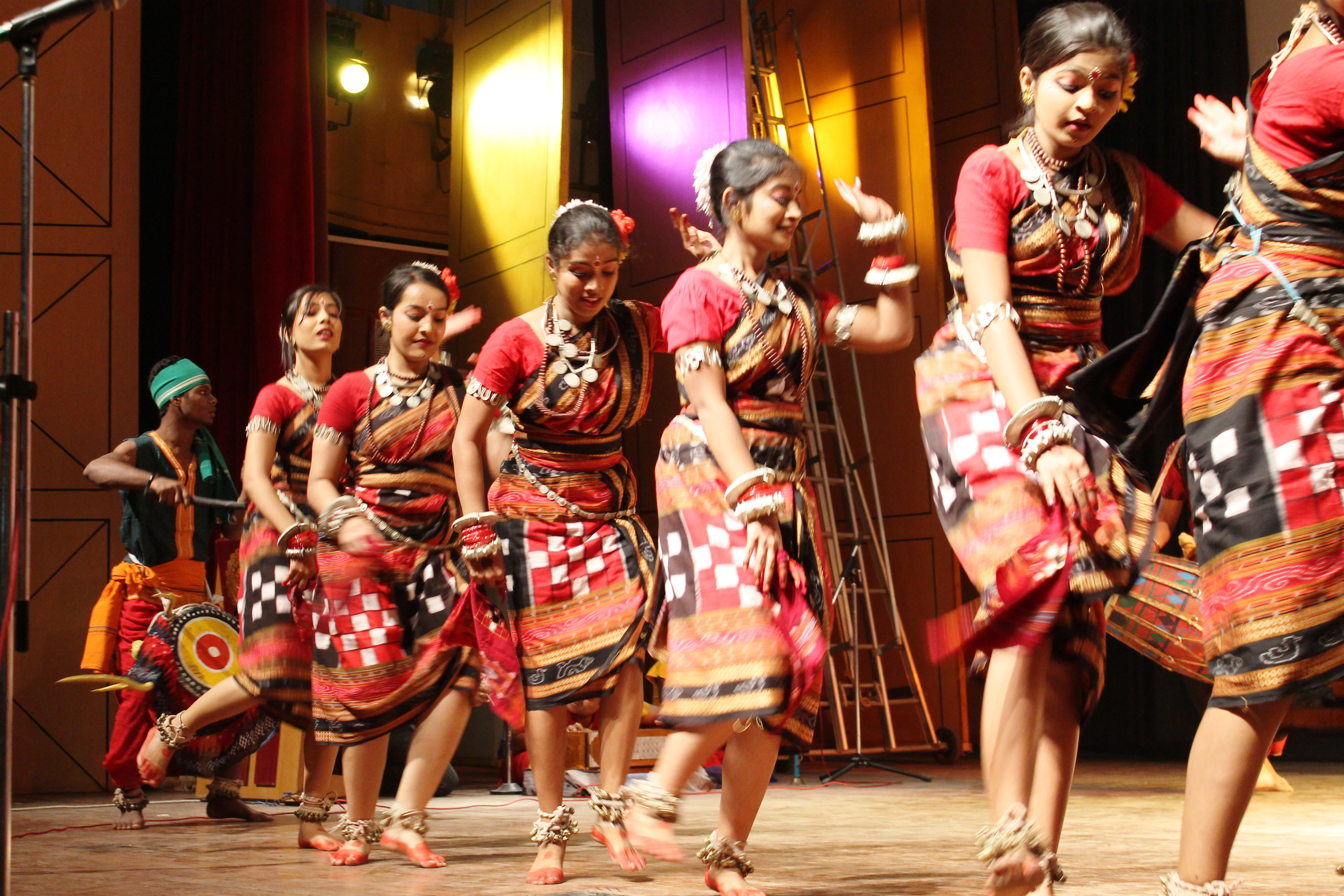
Sambalpuri Dance

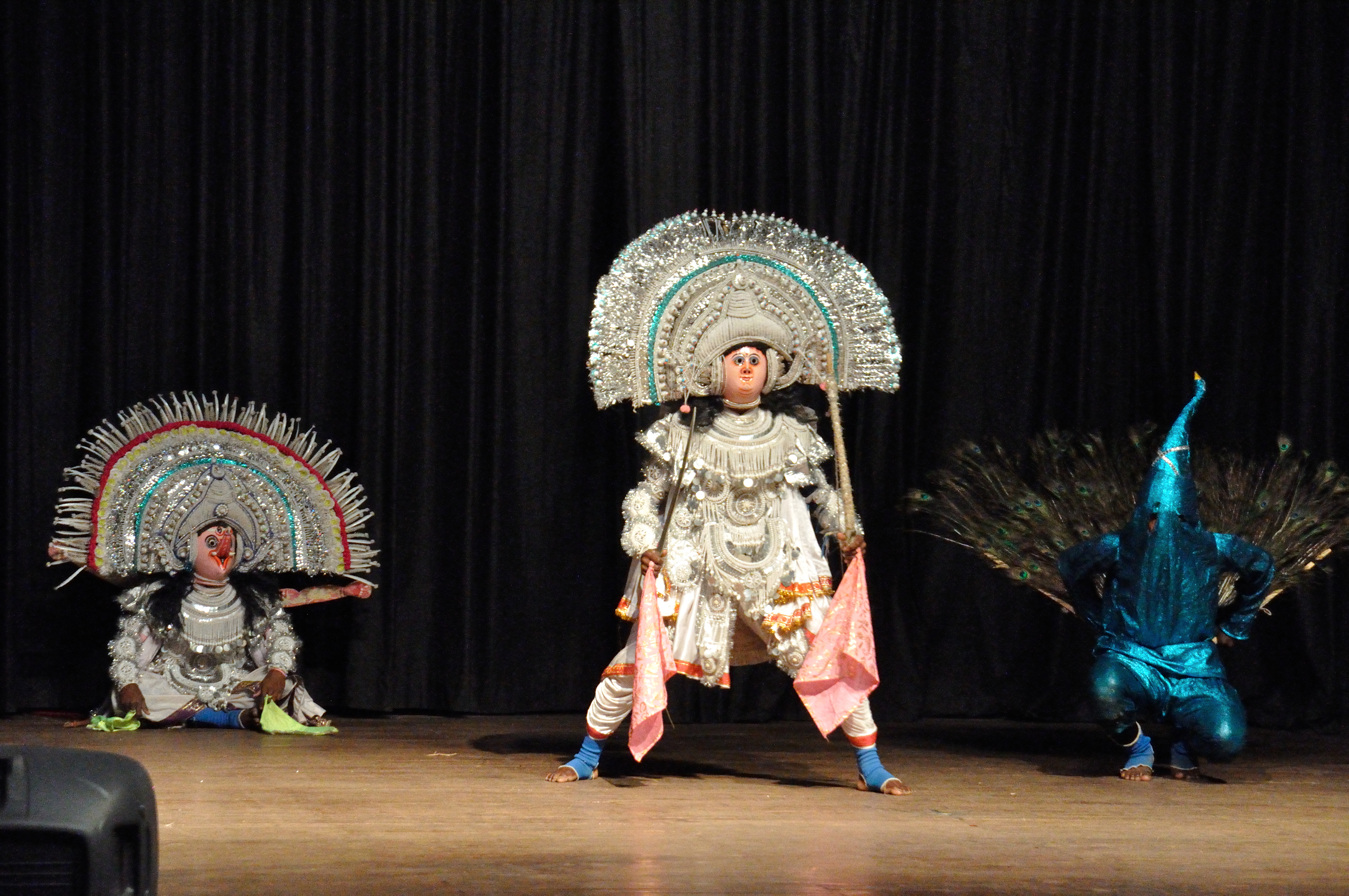
Chhau Dance

Odissi (Odissi) is a classical dance in Eastern India. It originates from the state of Odisha, in Eastern India. It is the oldest surviving dance form of India on the basis of archaeological evidences. Odissi has a long, unbroken tradition of 2,000 years and finds mention in the Natyashastra of Bharatamuni, possibly written circa 200 BCE. Mahari Dance is one of the important dance forms of Odisha and originated in the temples of Odisha. History of Odisha provides evidence of the 'Devadasi' cult in Odisha. Devadasis were dancing girls who were dedicated to the temples of Odisha. The Devadasis in Odisha were known as 'Maharis' and the dance performed by them came to be known as Mahari Dance. Gotipua dance is another form of dance in Odisha. In Oriya colloquial language Gotipua means single boy. The dance performance done by a single boy is known as Gotipua dance.

There are many folk dances in east India, with the best-known being Jhijhiya, Jhumair, Domkach, Ghumura Dance, Sambalpuri and Chhau dance.

Jhijhiya is a cultural dance from the Mithila region. Jhijhiya is mostly performed at time of Dusshera, in dedication to Durga Bhairavi, the goddess of victory. While performing jhijhiya, women put lanterns made of clay on their head and they balance it while they dance.

Jhumair is a folk dance in Chota Nagpur Plateau region of Jharkhand, Chhattisgarh, Odisha and West Bengal. It is performed during harvest season and festivals accompanied by musical instrument such as Madal, Dhol, Bansuri, Nagara, Dhak and Shehnai.

Domkach is folk dance in the state of Bihar, Jharkhand, Chhattisgarh and Odisha. It performed during marriage in the house of Bride and groom.

Chhau is a form of tribal martial dance popular in the Indian states of West Bengal, Jharkhand and Odisha. There are three regional variations of the dance. Seraikella Chau was developed in Seraikella, the administrative head of the Seraikela Kharsawan district of Jharkhand; Purulia Chau in Purulia district of West Bengal; and Mayurbhanj Chau in Mayurbhanj district of Odisha.

Ghumura Dance Archaeological evidence shows cave paintings from the pre-historic period discovered by Gudahandi of Kalahandi and Yogi Matha of Nuapada district that represent the Ghumura and Damru, among other instruments. These paintings date to as early as 8000 BCE and from such painting the antiquity of musical instrument Ghumura and Damru can be imagined. The origin of Ghumura goes back to ancient times. There is a waterfall in the river valley of Indravati which was initially recognised by Chindak Naagas of Chakrakot. Many believe that Ghumura dance originated from this river valley and gradually spread into the areas between Indravati and Mahanadi, indicating this dance form belongs to the 10th century CE.

Bengali dance forms draw from folk traditions, especially those of the tribal groups, as well as from the broader Indian dance tradition. Dance forms of Bihar are another expression of rich traditions and ethnic identity. There are several folk dance forms that can keep one enthralled, such as dhobi nach, jhumarnach, manjhi, gondnach, jitiyanach, more morni, dom-domin, bhuiababa, rah baba, kathghorwa nach, jat jatin, launda nach, bamar nach, jharni, jhijhia, natua nach, bidapad nach, sohrai nach and gond nach.

=== Music ===
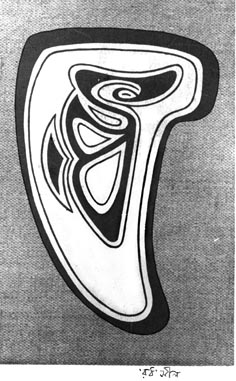
Black-and-white close-up photograph of a piece of wood boldly painted in unmixed solid strokes of black and white in a stylised semblance to "ro" and "tho" from the Bengali syllabary.

Rabindra Sangeet, also known as Tagore Songs, are songs written and composed by Rabindranath Tagore. They have distinctive characteristics in the music of Bengal, popular in India and Bangladesh. "Sangeet" means music, "Rabindra Sangeet" means Songs of Rabindra.

Rabindra Sangeet used Indian classical music and traditional folk music as sources. Tagore wrote some 2,230 songs.

Rabindranath Tagore was a towering figure in Indian music. Writing in Bengali, he created a library of over 2,000 songs now known by Bengalis as rabindra sangeet whose form is primarily influenced by Hindustani classical, sub-classicals, Karnatic, western, bauls, bhatiyali and different folk songs of India. Many singers in West Bengal and Bangladesh base their entire careers on the singing of Tagore musical masterpieces. The national anthem of India and national anthem of Bangladesh are Rabindra Sangeets.

West Bengal's capital Kolkata is also the cultural capital of India.

Panchali is a form of narrative folk songs of the Indian state of West Bengal. The word Panchali probably originates from panchal or panchalika, meaning puppet. According to another school of that, Panchali originates from the word panch, which means five in Bengali language, referring to the five elements of this genre: song, music, extempore versifying, poetic contests, and dance.

==== Music of Odisha ====
Odissi music is a classical music in India originated from the eastern state of Odisha. Indian Classical music has five significant branches: Avanti, Panchali, Udramagadhi, Hindustani and carnatic. Of these, Udramagadhi exists in the form of Odissi music. Generally, Odissi is one of the classical dances of India performed with Odissi music. Odissi music got shaped during the time of famous Oriya poet, Jayadeva, who composed lyrics meant to be sung. By the 11th century CE folk music of Odisha existing in the form of Triswari, Chatuhswari, and Panchaswari was modified into the classical style. However, Odissi songs were written even before the Odia language developed. Odissi music has a rich legacy dating back to the 2nd century BCE, when king Kharvela, the ruler of Odisha (Kalinga) patronised this music and dance.

Like Hindustani and Carnatic systems, Odissi music is a separate system of Indian classical music and is having all the essential as well as potential ingredients of Indian Classical form. But it has not come to limelight due to apathy from the time of British rule in Odisha, want of its proper study, revival, propagation, etc. Despite the fact, the traditional music form could be saved and maintained in its pristine form. Thanks to the musicians particularly of Jaga Akhadas of Puri district, who could develop and maintain the music. The music movement of Odisha, however, took a different turn after independence.

Like other aspects of her culture, music of the sacred land (Odisha) is charming, colourful, variegated encompassing various types. The existing musical tradition of Odisha, the cumulative experience of the last two thousand five hundred years if not more, can broadly be grouped under five categories such as: (1) Tribal Music, (2) Folk Music, (3) Light Music, (4) Light-Classical Music, (5) Classical Music, which need a short elucidations for better understanding the subject in all India context.

The tribal music as the title signifies is confined to the tribals living mainly in the hilly and jungle regions and sparsely in the coastal belt of Odisha. Odisha has the third largest concentration of tribes constituting about one fourth of the total population. They are distributed over 62 tribal communities.

Odisha home to many folk songs which are sung during occasions such as festivals. Notable varieties of Odissi folk music include Geeta, Balipuja Geeta, Kela Keluni Geeta, Dalkhai Geeta, Kendra Geeta, Jaiphula Geeta, Ghumura Geeta, Ghoda Nacha and Danda Nacha Geeta, Gopal Ugala and Osa-Parva-Geeta etc.

Bhajan, Janan, Oriya songs based on ragas, Rangila Chaupadi etc. are grouped under Light classical music, which forms an important segment of Oriya music. Sri Geetagovinda, Anirjukta Pravadha, Divya Manusi Prabandha, Chautisa, Chhanda, Chaupadi (now known as Odissi), Champu, Malasri, Sariman, nVyanjani, Chaturang, Tribhang, Kuduka Geeta, Laxana and Swaramalika are the various sub-forms, which individually or collectively constitute the traditional Odissi music. These sub-forms of the traditional Odissi music, can be categorised under the classical music of Odisha.

== Sports ==
The East Zone cricket team is a first-class cricket team that represents Eastern India in the Duleep Trophy and Deodhar Trophy. It is a composite team of five first-class Indian teams from Eastern India competing in the Ranji Trophy, containing notably the Bengal, Jharkhand and Odisha from East India among the bunch.

=== In Jharkhand ===
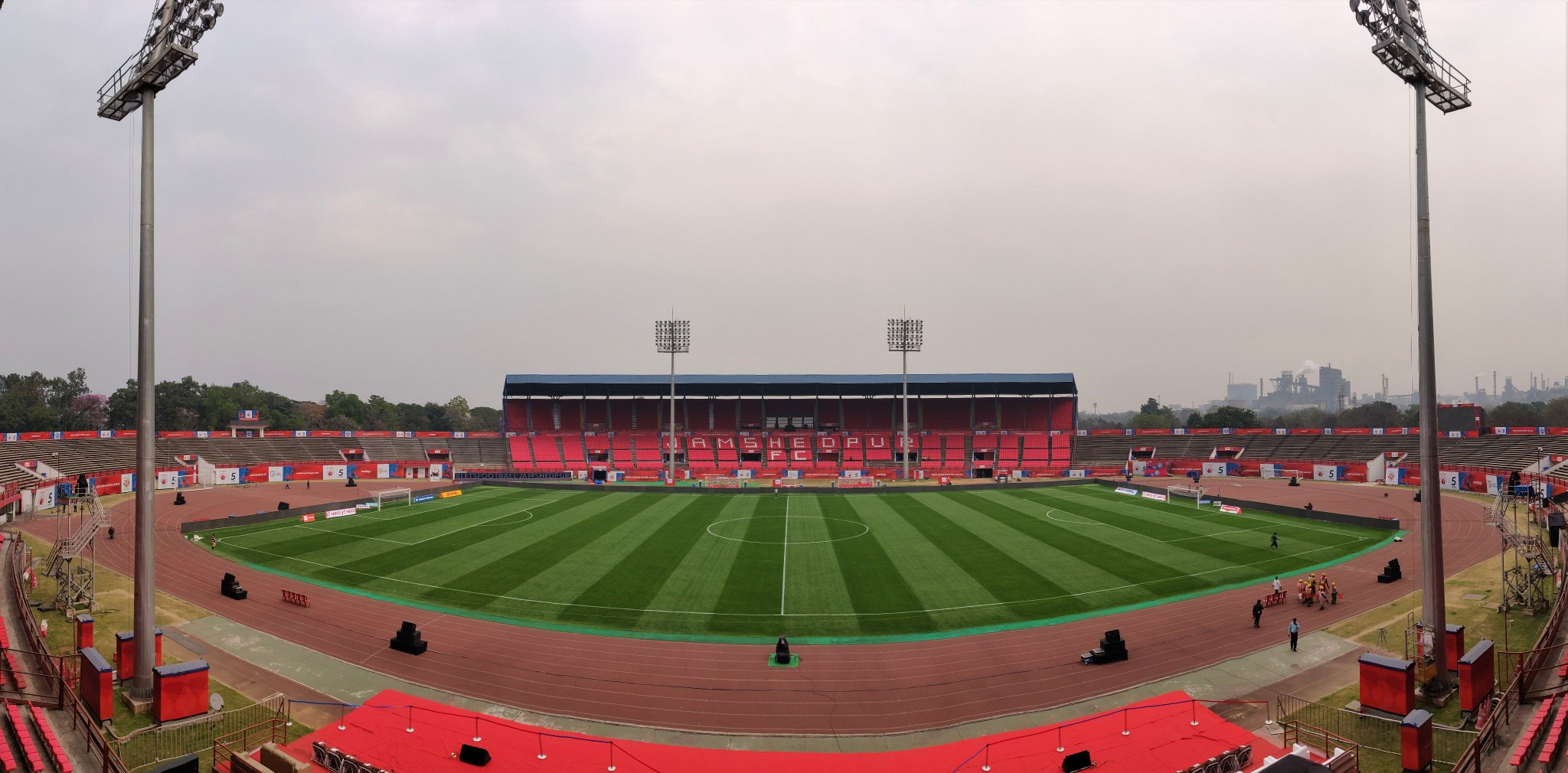
J.R.D Tata Stadium at Jamshedpur

The most popular sports in Jharkhand is Hockey and Archery. The capital City of Ranchi is also called the sports capital of India due to its highly developed sports infrastructure. Many famous players such as Mahendra Singh Dhoni (Former Indian Cricket Team Captain), Ishan Kishan (Indian Cricketer) etc. are from Jharkhand. Ranchi and Jamshedpur have cricket stadium of International levels and many international matches have held there since the formation of state. JSCA International Cricket Stadium is an international cricket stadium in Ranchi with a seating capacity of 50,000. There is a Hockey and Football Stadium of International level in Morabadi locality of Ranchi. An integrated sports complex in Khelgaon, Ranchi of International standards. It has swimming pool, badminton stadium etc. Ranchi Rays is a hockey team based in Ranchi and plays in Hockey India League. Jamshedpur FC is a football team based in Jamshedpur and plays for Indian Super League.

=== In West Bengal ===
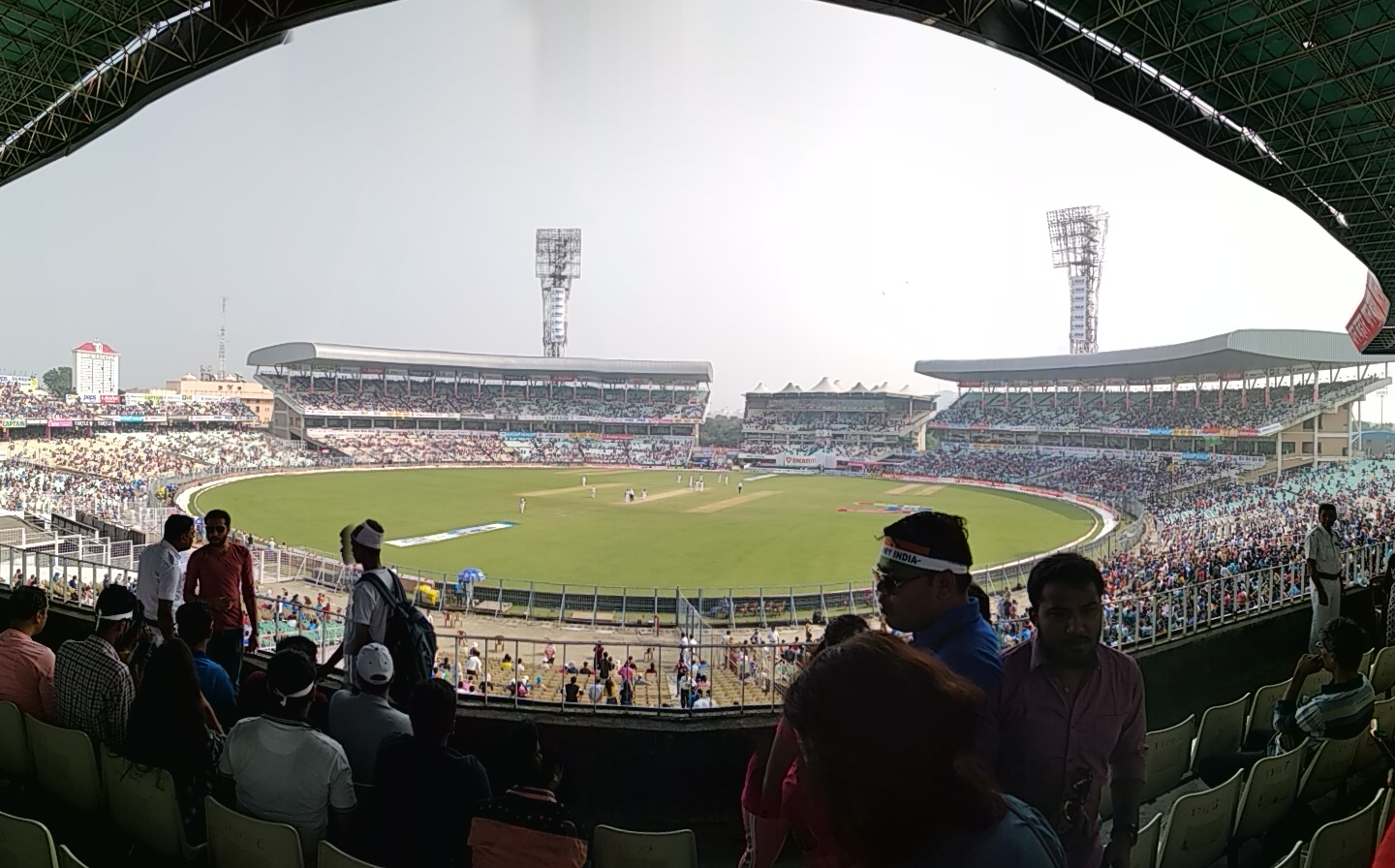
Eden Gardens, the second largest cricket stadium in India

The most popular sports in Kolkata are football and cricket. The city is a centre of football activity in India and is home to top national clubs such as Mohun Bagan A.C., East Bengal FC, United SC and the Mohammedan Sporting Club. Calcutta Football League, which was started in 1898, is the oldest football league in Asia. Mohun Bagan AC, one of the oldest football clubs in Asia, is the only organisation to be dubbed a "National Club of India". As in the rest of India, cricket is popular in Kolkata and is played on grounds and in streets throughout the city. Kolkata has an Indian Premier League franchise known as the Kolkata Knight Riders; the Cricket Association of Bengal, which regulates cricket in West Bengal, is also based in the city. Tournaments, especially those involving cricket, football, badminton, and carrom, are regularly organised on an inter-locality or inter-club basis. The Maidan, a vast field that serves as the city's largest park, hosts several minor football and cricket clubs and coaching institutes. Eden Gardens, which has a capacity of 90,000 as of 2011, hosted the final match of the 1987 Cricket World Cup. It is home to the Bengal cricket team and the Kolkata Knight Riders. The multi-use Salt Lake Stadium, also known as Yuva Bharati Krirangan, is the world's second-largest football facility by seating capacity as of 2010. The Calcutta Cricket and Football Club is the second-oldest cricket club in the world. Kolkata has three 18-hole golf courses. The oldest is at the Royal Calcutta Golf Club, and was the first golf club to be built outside the United Kingdom. The other two are located at the Tollygunge Club and at Fort William. The Royal Calcutta Turf Club hosts horse racing and polo matches. The Calcutta Polo Club is considered the oldest extant polo club in the world. The Calcutta South Club is a venue for national and international tennis tournaments; it held the first grass-court national championship in 1946. In the period 2005–2007, Sunfeast Open, a tier-III tournament on the Women's Tennis Association circuit, was held in the Netaji Indoor Stadium; it has since been discontinued.

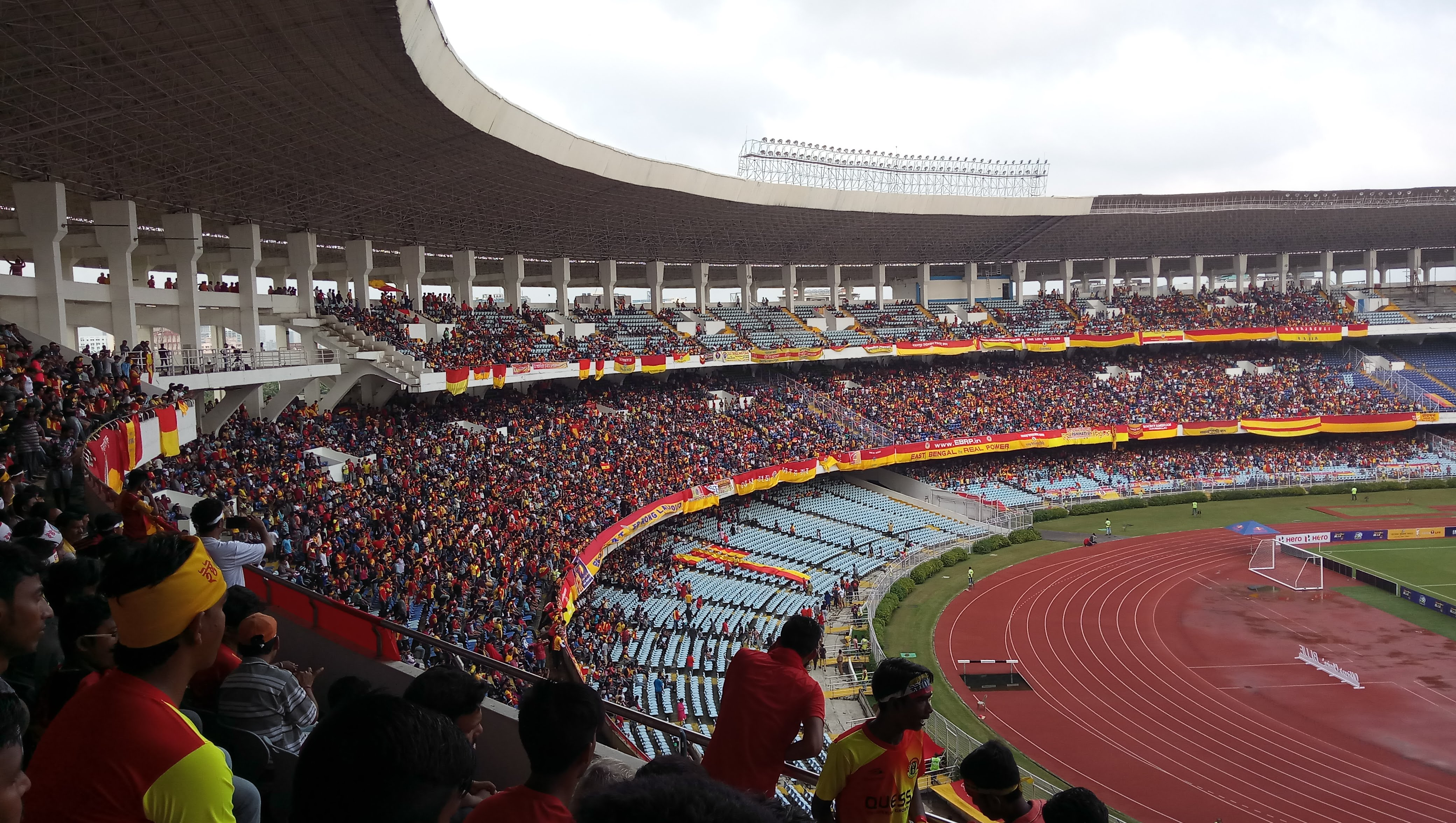
Salt Lake Stadium, Kolkata

The Calcutta Rowing Club hosts rowing heats and training events. Kolkata, considered the leading centre of rugby union in India, gives its name to the oldest international tournament in rugby union, the Calcutta Cup. The Automobile Association of Eastern India, established in 1904, and the Bengal Motor Sports Club are involved in promoting motor sports and car rallies in Kolkata and West Bengal. The Beighton Cup, an event organised by the Bengal Hockey Association and first played in 1895, is India's oldest field hockey tournament; it is usually held on the Mohun Bagan Ground of the Maidan. Athletes from Kolkata include Sourav Ganguly and Pankaj Roy, who are former captains of the Indian national cricket team; Olympic tennis bronze medallist Leander Paes, golfer Arjun Atwal, and former footballers Sailen Manna, Chuni Goswami, P. K. Banerjee and Subrata Bhattacharya.

The Cricket Association of Bengal (CAB) is the governing body for cricket in West Bengal. Its headquarters is in the Eden Gardens stadium. It organises different types of cricket tournaments in West Bengal.
Cricket Association of Bengal is affiliated to the Board of control for cricket in India is the parent body or governing the game of Cricket in Bengal, and involved in conducting the game of cricket in Bengal. The Cricket Association of Bengal promotes and develops Cricket by conducting various League Tournaments, tournaments for the age group Under-13, Under-16, and Under-19 and Under-21 categories. CAB also conducts National and International Tournaments.

=== In Odisha ===
The most popular sports in Odisha are cricket and hockey.

==== Cricket ====
The Odisha Cricket Association (OCA) is the governing body of the cricket activities in the Odisha state of India and the Odisha cricket team. It is affiliated to the Board of Control for Cricket in India. The Barabati Stadium in Cuttack hosts international cricket matches. The Odisha Cricket Association promotes and develops cricket by conducting various League Tournaments, Tournaments for the age group Under-13, Under-15, Under-17, and Under-19, Under-22 and Under-25 categories besides organising and conducting National Tournaments. The OCA started a local Twenty-20 tournament, Odisha Premier League (OPL) in the lines of Indian Premier League (IPL) in 2011. OCA manages the Barabati Stadium and has got infrastructures and facilities like Odisha cricket academy, newly built Sachin Tendulkar indoor cricket hall and many grounds like DRIEMS cricket stadium, Ravenshaw university ground, SCB medical ground, Nimpur ground, Basundhara (Bidanasi) ground, Sunshine Ground etc.

==== Hockey ====
The popularity of field hockey in Odisha is also very high. Many national players in hockey are from Odisha. Lazarus Barla, Prabodh Tirkey, Dilip Tirkey, Ignace Tirkey, Jyoti Sunita Kullu, Subhadra Pradhan, Birendra Lakra and Anupa Barla are the few names who brought the fame to Indian hockey in International level. Premier Hockey League (PHL) was the league competition for field hockey clubs in the top divisions of the Indian hockey system. There were seven teams in the PHL and in East India the only team was the Orissa Steelers who won Premier Hockey League 2007. Odisha has a franchise in Hockey India League (HIL) named Kalinga Lancers owned by Odisha Industrial Infrastructure Development Corporation and MCL. Odisha got its first Indian Super League (ISL) club Odisha FC, based in Bhubaneswar, which was formed in 2019 after being shifted from Delhi. Its home ground is the 15,000 seater Kalinga Stadium. Bhubaneswar is referred to as the "Sports Capital of India". 2023 Men's FIH Hockey World Cup and 2018 Men's Hockey World Cup were held at Kalinga Stadium and Birsa Munda International Hockey Stadium respectively.

== Ports ==
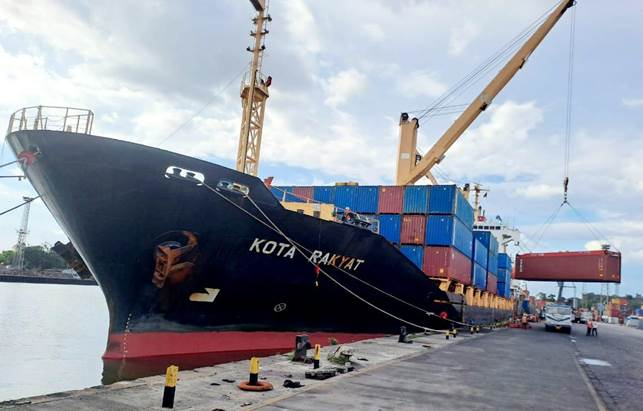
A ship at Kolkata Port

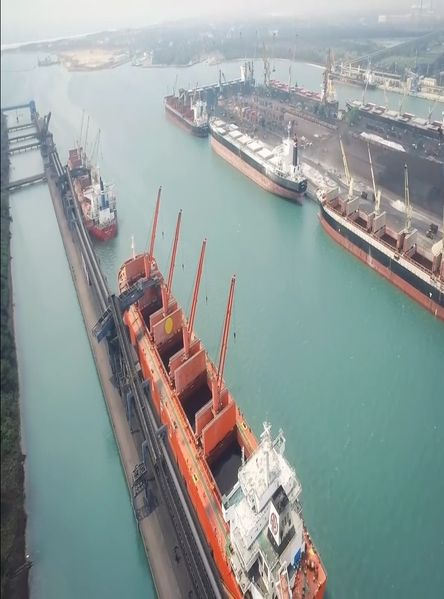
Paradip Port

Kolkata Port, Paradip Port, Dhamra Port and Haldia are 4 major ports in East India. Subarnarekha Port, Kulpi Port, Gopalpur Port are minor ports in East India.

== See also ==
- Eastern States Agency, colonial office of the Bengal Presidency of British India, created by merging the Chhattisgarh States – and Orissa States agencies in 1933, to which the Bengal States Agency was added in 1936; included part of Burma
- North India
- Northeast India
- South India
- West India
- Central India
- Administrative divisions of India
- Eastern South Asia
