= List of Monuments of National Importance in Odisha =

This is a list of Monuments of National Importance (ASI) as officially recognized by and available through the website of the Archaeological Survey of India in the Indian state Odisha. The monument identifier is a combination of the abbreviation of the subdivision of the list (state, ASI circle) and the numbering as published on the website of the ASI. 78 Monuments of National Importance have been recognized by the ASI in Odisha.

== List of monuments ==
SL. No.	Description	Location	Address	District	Coordinates	Image
N-OR-1	Chausath Jogini temple together with three minor shrines	Ranipur Jharial	Ranipur Jharial, Balangir	Balangir	20°16′58″N 82°57′51″E	Chausath Jogini temple together with three minor shrines
N-OR-2	Ruined fortress	Agrahat, Bandals, Choudwar, Chhatisa, Govind Jew, Patna, Jaj, Bhariab, Kapaleswar, Kedareswar, Mundmal	Choudwar	Cuttack	20°32′15″N 85°55′02″E	Upload Photo
N-OR-3	Ruins of the Buddhist temples and images	Bandareswar		Cuttack		Upload Photo
N-OR-4	Bhubaneswar Mahadev temple	Balia	On the Bank of River Biluakhai, Balia	Jagatsinghpur	20°18′48″N 86°04′28″E	Bhubaneswar Mahadev temple
N-OR-5	Hill containing many valuable sculptures, images and inscriptions, etc., of Buddhistic age. On the top, there is a math and a temple of Mahakal(N-OR-69)	Ratnagiri		Jajpur	20°38′32″N 86°20′10″E	Hill containing many valuable sculptures, images and inscriptions, etc., of Buddhistic age. On the top, there is a math and a temple of Mahakal(N-OR-69) More images
N-OR-6	Ancient monuments of Barabati Fortress and the ruins and remains of all ancient edifices, gateways, etc., except the mosque	Cuttack	Barabati Fort Rd, Biju Patnaik Colony, Cuttack, Odisha 753008	Cuttack	20°29′05″N 85°51′52″E	Ancient monuments of Barabati Fortress and the ruins and remains of all ancient edifices, gateways, etc., except the mosque More images
N-OR-7	Churangarh Fort locally known as Sarangarh, excluding the area acquired by the State Government	Dadhapatna		Cuttack	20°25′00″N 85°48′16″E	Upload Photo
N-OR-8	Four colossal images in the compound of Collectorate Jajpur namely :- 1) Chamunda, 2) Indrani, 3) Kalijuga(not here), 4) Varahi	Jajpur	Opposite Jajpur High School	Jajpur	20°51′10″N 86°19′47″E	Upload Photo
N-OR-9	Three Buddhist images in the compound of Collectorate Jajpur	Jajpur	Opposite Jajpur High School	Jajpur	20°51′10″N 86°19′47″E	Upload Photo
N-OR-10	Ruins of Buddhist temples and images	Naltigiri (Lalitagiri)	Lalitagiri, Balichandrapur, Jajapur	Jajpur	20°35′25″N 86°15′09″E	Ruins of Buddhist temples and images More images
N-OR-11	Major ruined Buddhist site with 3 monasteries and hundreds of stupas; abundant sculpture	Ratnagiri	Ratnagiri, Jajapur, Odisha 755003	Jajpur	20°38′32″N 86°20′10″E	Major ruined Buddhist site with 3 monasteries and hundreds of stupas; abundant sculpture
N-OR-12	Mahratta bridge locally known as the Atharnulla (eighteen arches bridge) and also as Tentulimal bridge	Jajpur		Jajpur	20°50′16″N 86°20′11″E	Upload Photo
N-OR-13	Monolith called Chandeswar Pillar	Sriapur		Cuttack	20°50′20″N 86°20′18″E	Upload Photo
N-OR-14	Simhanatha Mahadeva temple	Simhanatha Pitha, Mauza Gopinathpur	Gopinathpur, Baramba, Cuttack	Cuttack	20°22′17″N 85°22′48″E	Upload Photo
N-OR-15	Pancha Pandava temple	Ganeswarpur	Ganeswarpur, Near Chhatia, Cuttack	Cuttack	20°34′58″N 86°04′23″E	Pancha Pandava temple More images
N-OR-16	Durga temple	Baideswar	AT/PO-Baideswar, Banki, Cuttack	Cuttack	20°21′24″N 85°23′40″E	Durga temple More images
N-OR-17	Banasur Temple, Ancient site at Baneswaranasi	Padamal Pattana	Baneswarnasi, Ekadal, Narasinghpur, Cuttack	Cuttack	20°23′37″N 85°08′41″E	Banasur Temple, Ancient site at Baneswaranasi More images
N-OR-18	Mahimamani Temple	Ragadi (Banki)	AT/PO-Ragadi, Banki, Cuttack	Cuttack	20°21′09″N 85°31′08″E	Mahimamani Temple More images
N-OR-19	Ancient site at Chowdar, Budhalinga Temple	Chowdar	Chaudwar, Cuttack	Cuttack	20°32′36″N 85°55′42″E	Upload Photo
N-OR-20	Bringesvara Mahadeva temple	Bajrakot	AT/PO-Bajrakota, Rengali Town, Angul	Angul	21°12′52″N 85°02′37″E	Upload Photo
N-OR-21	Rock-cut Vishnu	Rasol		Angul	21°05′35″N 85°04′37″E	Upload Photo
N-OR-22	Gangadharaswami temple	Katakala, Budhakhol	Katakala Buguda	Ganjam	19°49′13″N 84°49′24″E	Upload Photo
N-OR-23	Jagdiswaraswami temple	Katakala, Budhakhol	Katakala Buguda	Ganjam	19°49′13″N 84°49′24″E	Upload Photo
N-OR-24	Bhima temple	Mahendragiri		Gajapati	18°58′03″N 84°21′56″E	Upload Photo
N-OR-25	Kunti temple	Mahendragiri		Gajapati	18°57′51″N 84°22′10″E	Upload Photo
N-OR-26	Yudhistra temple	Mahendragiri		Gajapati	18°58′01″N 84°22′07″E	Upload Photo
N-OR-27	Asoka rock inscriptions at Jaugada	Pandya	Purussottampur, Ganjam	Ganjam	19°31′22″N 84°49′51″E	Asoka rock inscriptions at Jaugada More images
N-OR-28	Prehistoric sites	Baidyapur		MayurBhanj	21°42′18″N 86°55′25″E	Upload Photo
N-OR-29	Ruins of ancient fort	Haripurgarh		MayurBhanj	21°48′13″N 86°42′57″E	Ruins of ancient fort
N-OR-30	Prehistoric sites	Kuchai		MayurBhanj	22°00′41″N 86°41′36″E	Upload Photo
N-OR-31	Prehistoric sites	Kuliana		MayurBhanj	22°04′08″N 86°38′50″E	Upload Photo
N-OR-32	Paintings on the rock locally known as Ravana Chhaya and other ancient monuments and remain	Sitabhanji		Kendujhar	21°30′44″N 85°46′35″E	Paintings on the rock locally known as Ravana Chhaya and other ancient monuments and remain More images
N-OR-33	Ancient site of Asurgarh fort	Asurgarh		Kalahandi	20°04′53″N 83°21′18″E	Upload Photo
N-OR-34	Temple of Nilamadhava and Sidheswara	Gandharadhi	Gandharadi, Jgati, Boudh	Boudh	20°52′30″N 84°12′19″E	Temple of Nilamadhava and Sidheswara More images
N-OR-35	Paschima Somnatha, Bhubanesvara and Kapilesvara temples	Boudh	Boudh Town	Boudh	20°50′39″N 84°18′58″E	Paschima Somnatha, Bhubanesvara and Kapilesvara temples More images
N-OR-36	Bhaskareswar temple	Bhubaneswar	Tankapani Road, Bhubaneswar	Khordha	20°14′40″N 85°51′10″E	Bhaskareswar temple More images
N-OR-37	Brahmeswara Temple with its minor shrines in the compound	Bhubaneswar	Near, Tankapani Rd, Siba Nagar, Brahmeswarpatna, Bhubaneswar, Odisha 751002	Khordha	20°14′23″N 85°51′06″E	Brahmeswara Temple with its minor shrines in the compound More images
N-OR-38	Nabakeswar Temple	Bhubaneswar	Nageswar Tangi, Old Town, Bhubaneswar	Khordha	20°14′45″N 85°50′21″E	Upload Photo
N-OR-39	Rameshwar Deula	Bhubaneswar	Mausima Chowk, Old Town, Bhubaneswar	Khordha	20°15′13″N 85°50′09″E	Rameshwar Deula More images
N-OR-40	Megheswar Temple with its minor shrine	Bhubaneswar	Tankapani Road, Bhubaneswar	Khordha	20°14′36″N 85°51′23″E	Upload Photo
N-OR-41	Ananta Vasudeva Temple	Bhubaneswar	Lingaraj Temple Road, Old Town, Bhubaneswar	Khordha	20°14′26″N 85°50′09″E	Ananta Vasudeva Temple More images
N-OR-42	Bakreswar temple	Bhubaneswar	Old Town, Bhubaneswar	Khordha	20°14′27″N 85°49′53″E	Upload Photo
N-OR-43	Chitrakarni temple	Bhubaneswar	Old Town, Bhubaneswar	Khordha	20°14′22″N 85°50′01″E	Chitrakarni temple More images
N-OR-44	Yameshwar Temple with its minor shrine	Bhubaneswar	Old Town, Bhubaneswar	Khordha	20°14′25″N 85°49′53″E	Yameshwar Temple with its minor shrine More images
N-OR-45	Lord Lingaraj Temple with all the minar temples in the compound namely: 1. Amania well, 2. Astmurti, 3. Chandeswar Deb, 4. Gopaluni temple, 5. Ladukeswar temple, 6. Parbati temple, 7. Sabitri Devi temple, 8. Sakreswar temple, 9. Sathidosi temple	Bhubaneswar	Old Town, Bhubaneswar	Khordha	20°14′19″N 85°50′01″E	Lord Lingaraj Temple with all the minar temples in the compound namely: 1. Amania well, 2. Astmurti, 3. Chandeswar Deb, 4. Gopaluni temple, 5. Ladukeswar temple, 6. Parbati temple, 7. Sabitri Devi temple, 8. Sakreswar temple, 9. Sathidosi temple More images
N-OR-46	Maitreswar temple with all the minor temples in the compound	Bhubaneswar	Old Town, Bhubaneswar	Khordha	20°14′23″N 85°49′59″E	Maitreswar temple with all the minor temples in the compound
N-OR-47	Makareswar temple with its minor	Bhubaneswar	Old Town, Bhubaneswar	Khordha	20°14′23″N 85°49′57″E	Upload Photo
N-OR-48	Markandeswar temple	Bhubaneswar	Old Town, Bhubaneswar	Khordha	20°14′28″N 85°50′01″E	Markandeswar temple
N-OR-49	Mukteswar temple with its minar shrines but excluding the Murich Kunda.	Bhubaneswar	Old Town, Bhubaneswar	Khordha	20°14′34″N 85°50′26″E	Mukteswar temple with its minar shrines but excluding the Murich Kunda. More images
N-OR-50	Paramguru temple	Bhubaneswar	Old Town, Bhubaneswar	Khordha	20°14′33″N 85°49′56″E	Upload Photo
N-OR-51	Papnasini Tank	Bhubaneswar	Old Town, Bhubaneswar	Khordha	20°14′22″N 85°49′59″E	Papnasini Tank More images
N-OR-52	Parsurameswar Temple	Bhubaneswar	Old Town, Bhubaneswar	Khordha	20°14′35″N 85°50′21″E	Parsurameswar Temple More images
N-OR-53	Rajarani Temple	Bhubaneswar	Tankapani Road, Bhubaneswar	Khordha	20°14′37″N 85°50′37″E	Rajarani Temple More images
N-OR-54	Sahasralinga Tank	Bhubaneswar		Khordha	20°14′19″N 85°50′06″E	Upload Photo
N-OR-55	Sari Deul	Bhubaneswar	Old Town, Bhubaneswar	Khordha	20°14′24″N 85°50′03″E	Upload Photo
N-OR-56	Sidheswar temple	Bhubaneswar	Old Town, Bhubaneswar	Khordha	20°14′34″N 85°50′25″E	Sidheswar temple More images
N-OR-57	Sisiresvara temple	Bhubaneswar	Old Town, Bhubaneswar	Khordha	20°14′33″N 85°49′57″E	Sisiresvara temple More images
N-OR-58	Varahi temple	Chaurasi	Charichhak-Kakatpur Road, Amareswar, Chaurasi, Puri	Puri	20°03′30″N 86°07′07″E	Varahi temple More images
N-OR-59	Rock inscription of the edicts of Asoka and the sculpture of elephant	Dhauli		Khordha	20°11′22″N 85°50′33″E	Rock inscription of the edicts of Asoka and the sculpture of elephant More images
N-OR-60	Small rock cut cell with a niche and an inscription of Santikara	Dhauli		Khordha	20°11′32″N 85°50′28″E	Upload Photo
N-OR-61	Chausath Yogini temple known as Mahamaya temple	Hirapur	Balianta, Hirapur, Khordha	Khordha	20°13′30″N 85°52′43″E	Chausath Yogini temple known as Mahamaya temple More images
N-OR-62	All ancient caves, structures and other monuments or remains situated on the Udaygiri and the Khandagiri hills (also: Udayagiri and Khandagiri Caves) except the temple of Parasnath on the top of the Khandagiri hill and also the temple in front of the Barabhuji and the Trisula Caves	Khandagiri	Khandagiri, Bhubaneswar	Khordha	20°15′46″N 85°47′10″E	All ancient caves, structures and other monuments or remains situated on the Udaygiri and the Khandagiri hills (also: Udayagiri and Khandagiri Caves) except the temple of Parasnath on the top of the Khandagiri hill and also the temple in front of the Barabhuji and the Trisula Caves More images
N-OR-63	Konark Sun Temple	Konark	AT/PO-Konark, Puri	Puri	19°53′15″N 86°05′41″E	Konark Sun Temple More images
N-OR-64	Bridge of eighteen openings over the Madhupur stream known as Athara Nala Bridge.	Puri		Puri	19°49′11″N 85°49′54″E	Bridge of eighteen openings over the Madhupur stream known as Athara Nala Bridge. More images
N-OR-65	Shri Jagannath Temple (built in 1161, Kalinga Architecture stile) and subsidiary shrines.	Puri		Puri	19°48′17″N 85°49′09″E	Shri Jagannath Temple (built in 1161, Kalinga Architecture stile) and subsidiary shrines. More images
N-OR-66	Daksha Prajapati temple	Raghunathpur, Banapur	Near Bhagabati Temple, Banapur, Balugaon	Puri	19°46′45″N 85°10′14″E	Daksha Prajapati temple More images
N-OR-67	Sisupalgarh Ancient remains inside and outside the rampart	Sisupalgarh	Sisupalgarh, Bhubaneswar	Khordha	20°13′46″N 85°50′52″E	Sisupalgarh Ancient remains inside and outside the rampart More images
N-OR-68	Vikramkhol rock inscriptions	Vikramkhol		Sambalpur	21°49′36″N 83°45′52″E	Upload Photo
N-OR-69	Dharma Mahakal Temple (beside the Buddhist site)	Ratnagiri	Ratnagiri, Jajapur	Jajpur	20°38′27″N 86°20′05″E	Dharma Mahakal Temple (beside the Buddhist site)
N-OR-70	Jagannath Temple	Jajpur	Dasaswamedha ghat, Jajapur Town	Jajpur	20°51′19″N 86°20′10″E	Jagannath Temple More images
N-OR-71	Trilochaneswar Temple	Jajpur	Near Biraja Temple, Jajapur Town	Jajpur	20°49′44″N 86°20′23″E	Trilochaneswar Temple More images
N-OR-72	Varahanatha Temple	Jajpur	Jajapur Town	Jajpur	20°51′30″N 86°20′08″E	Varahanatha Temple More images
N-OR-73	Udayagiri	Udayagiri	Ratnagiri Road, Udayagiri, Jajapur	Jajpur	20°38′30″N 86°16′09″E	Udayagiri More images
N-OR-74	Pushpagiri Vihara Langudi Hill	Mauza Panimuhani, Fazilpur & Salipur,.		Jajpur	20°43′22″N 86°11′25″E	Pushpagiri Vihara Langudi Hill More images
N-OR-75	Kapileswar Mahadev Temple	Hatuari	Badasuanlo, Kamakhyanagar	Dhenkanal	20°54′09″N 85°37′41″E	Kapileswar Mahadev Temple More images
N-OR-76	Chandrasekhar Temple Group of Monuments and Ancient Steps	Yogapitha Kapilas	Kapilas, Dhenkanal	Dhenkanal	20°40′54″N 85°45′47″E	Chandrasekhar Temple Group of Monuments and Ancient Steps More images
N-OR-77	Annakoteshvara Temple	Latadeipur	Joranda Road, Latadeipur, Dhenkanal	Dhenkanal	20°48′33″N 85°39′31″E	Annakoteshvara Temple More images
N-OR-78	Anantashayana Vishnu	Sarang	On the Bank of River Brahmani, Saranga	Dhenkanal	20°55′43″N 85°14′49″E	Anantashayana Vishnu More images

== See also ==
- List of Monuments of National Importance in India for other Monuments of National Importance in India
- List of State Protected Monuments in Odisha
