= Outline of Odisha =

Overview of and topical guide to Odisha

Location of Odisha

The following outline is provided as an overview of and topical guide to Odisha:

Odisha – one of the 29 states of India, located in the eastern coast. Odisha has 485 kilometres (301 mi) of coastline along the Bay of Bengal on its east, from Balasore to Malkangiri. It is the 9th largest state by area, and the 11th largest by population. Odia (formerly known as Oriya) is the official and most widely spoken language, spoken by 33.2 million according to the 2001 Census.

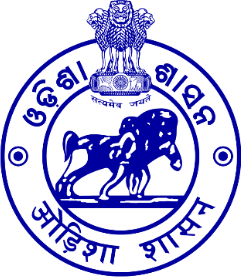
Seal of Odisha

loc -is in0

== General reference ==
=== Names ===
- Common name: Odisha
  - Pronunciation: /əˈdɪsə/;
- Official name: State of Odisha
- Originally known as : Kalinga (India)
- Nicknames
  - Utkala
- Adjectivals
  - Odia
- Demonyms
  - Odia
- Abbreviations and name codes
  - ISO 3166-2 code: IN-OR
  - Vehicle registration code: OD

=== Rankings (amongst India's states) ===
- by population: 11th
- by area (2011 census): 9th
- by crime rate (2015): 16th
- by gross domestic product (GDP) (2014): 15th
- by Human Development Index (HDI):
- by life expectancy at birth:
- by literacy rate:

== Geography of Odisha ==
Geography of Odisha

- Odisha is: an Indian state
- Population of Odisha:
- Area of Odisha:
- Atlas of Odisha

=== Location of Odisha ===
- Odisha is situated within the following regions:
  - Northern Hemisphere
  - Eastern Hemisphere
    - Eurasia
      - Asia
        - South Asia
          - Indian subcontinent
            - India
              - East India
- Time zone: Indian Standard Time (UTC+05:30)

=== Environment of Odisha ===
==== Protected areas in Odisha ====
- Baisipalli
- Balimela
- Bhitarkanika
- Mangroves
- Karlapat
- Nandankanan
- Saptasajya
- Satkosia Tiger Reserve
- Sunabeda Tiger Reserve
- Ushakothi

==== Natural geographic features of Odisha ====
- Rivers of Odisha

=== Regions of Odisha ===
==== Administrative divisions of Odisha ====
===== Districts of Odisha =====
- Districts of Odisha

===== Municipalities of Odisha =====
Municipalities of Odisha

- Capital of Odisha: Bhubaneswar Capital of Odisha
- Cities of Odisha

=== Demography of Odisha ===
Demographics of Odisha

== Government and politics of Odisha ==
Politics of Odisha

- Form of government: Indian state government (parliamentary system of representative democracy)
- Capital of Odisha: Bhubaneswar
- Elections in Odisha
  - (specific elections)

=== Union government in Odisha ===
- Rajya Sabha members from Odisha
- Odisha Pradesh Congress Committee
- Indian general election, 2009 (Odisha)
- Indian general election, 2014 (Odisha)

=== Branches of the government of Odisha ===
Government of Odisha

==== Executive branch of the government of Odisha ====
- Head of state: Governor of Odisha,
- Head of government: Chief Minister of Odisha,

==== Legislative branch of the government of Odisha ====
Odisha Legislative Assembly

- Constituencies of Odisha Legislative Assembly

=== Law and order in Odisha ===
- Law enforcement in Odisha
  - Odisha Police

== History of Odisha ==
History of Odisha

=== History of Odisha, by region ===
- Historic sites in Odisha

== Culture of Odisha ==
Culture of Odisha

- Cuisine of Odisha
- Monuments in Odisha
  - Monuments of National Importance in Odisha
  - State Protected Monuments in Odisha
- World Heritage Sites in Odisha

=== Art in Odisha ===
- Cinema of Odisha
- Music of Odisha
- Odisssy Dance

=== Languages of Odisha ===
- Odia
- Sambalpuri
- Hindi
- Bengali
- Telugu

=== People of Odisha ===
- People from Odisha

=== Religion in Odisha ===
Religion in Odisha

- Christianity in Odisha
- Hinduism in Odisha

=== Sports in Odisha ===
Sports in Odisha

- Cricket in Odisha
  - Odisha Cricket Association
  - Odisha cricket team
- Football in Odisha
  - Odisha football team

=== Symbols of Odisha ===
Symbols of Odisha

- State animal: ସମ୍ବର (sambar deer)
- State bird: ଭଦଭଦଳିଆ (Indian Roller)
- State flower: ଅଶୋକ ଫୁଲ (saraca asoca)
- State seal: Seal of Odisha
- State tree: ଅଶ୍ୱତ୍ଥ ବୃକ୍ଷ (sacred fig)

== Economy and infrastructure of Odisha ==
Economy of Odisha

- Tourism in Odisha
- Transport in Odisha
  - Airports in Odisha

== Education in Odisha ==
Education in Odisha

- Institutions of higher education in Odisha

== Health in Odisha ==
Health in Odisha

== See also ==
- Outline of India
