= Historic sites in Odisha =

This article lists monuments and sites of historic importance in Odisha, India.

== Prehistoric ==
Site	Date(s)	Picture	Location	Description	References
Gudahandi	c. 20000 BCE		Kalahandi district	Rock paintings from Upper Paleolithic.	
Vikramkhol	c. 3000 BCE		Jharsuguda	Prehistoric human rock shelter with inscriptions.	

== Ancient ==
Singhapura (In Jajpur Dist): Some historians said that it was the capital of Singha Bahu, a Kalinga King who was contemporary of Lord Buddh and Bimbisar of Rajgrih. His exiled son Prince Vijaya established Sinhalese dynasty in Sri Lanka.

Site	Date(s)	Picture	Location	Description	References
Dhauli	262 BCE	Dhauli hillock	Dhauli, Bhubaneswar	Site of the Kalinga War	
Sisupalgarh	c. 300 CE	Sisupalagada, Bhubaneswar	Bhubaneswar; 20°13′35.9″N 85°51′11.0″E	Ancient fort	
Asurgarh	c. 9th century BCE		Kalahandi	Asurgarh is an archaeological site in the Kalahandi district of Odisha, India. Asurgarh is one of the sites which has its beginning in around 8th-9th century BC and emerged as one of the early urban fortified settlements in the region and it is older than Sisupalgarh. Archaeologists have unearthed artefacts believed to be 2,300-year-old while carrying out excavation at the Asurgarh Fort in Odisha’s Kalahandi district. DB Gadanayak, Archaeological Survey of India, says Asurgarh is one of the sites which has its beginning in around 8th-9th century BC and emerged as one of the early urban fortified settlements in the region by the efforts of tribal and non-tribal inhabitants of the region. Lokesh Durga, Department of History of Delhi University, says Asurgarh settlement is older than Sisupalgarh and the first Urbanization process in Odisha started from Asurgarh.	
Bindusagar Tank	c. 7-8th century CE	Bindusagar	Old Town, Bhubaneswar	A ritual tank with a shrine in the centre	
Chausath Yogini Temples	c. 9th century CE	Chausath Yogini Temples	Jharial, Bolangir	A hypaethral temple for 64 yoginis	
Chausathi Jogini Temple	9th century CE	Chausathi Jogini Temple	Hirapur, Khurda	Hypaethral temple for 64 Yoginis in the outskirts of Bhubaneswar	
Anantashayana Vishnu	9th century CE		Sarang, Dhenkanal	15 metre long rock cut image of Vishnu lying in rest.	

== Medieval ==
Site	Date(s)	Picture	Location	Description	References
Ratnagiri	c. 10th century	Ratnagiri, Jajpur	Jajpur	Buddhist monastery built by the Bhauma-Kara dynasty	
Lalitgiri	c. 10th century	Lalitgiri, Jajpur	Cuttack	A group Buddhist monasteries	
Brahmeswara Temple	1058 CE	Brahmeswara Temple, Bhubaneswar	Bhubaneswar	Shiva temple built during reign of the Somavamsis	
Jagannath Temple	c. 1090	Sri Jagannath Temple Puri, Orissa	Puri	Vaishnava temple built by Eastern Ganga dynasty kings	
Lingaraja Temple	c. 1100	Lingaraj Temple, Bhubaneswar	Bhubaneswar	Shiva temple built by Somavamsi kings	
Gundicha Temple	12th century	Gundicha Temple	Puri	Built by the Eastern Ganga dynasty. Houses the main idols during the Ratha Yatra festival	
Barabati fort	c. 1230	Barabati Fort, Cuttack	Cuttack	Presumed to have been built by Anangabhimadev III of the Eastern Ganga dynasty	
Kapilash Temple	1246	Kapilasa temple, Dhenkanal	Dhenkanal	Shiva temple constructed by Narasingha Deva I	
Konark Sun Temple	c. 1250	Konark Sun Temple	Konark	Supposedly built by king Narasingha Deva I of Eastern Ganga Dynasty around 1250	
Ananta Vasudeva Temple	c.1278	Ananta Vasudeva Temple, Bhubaneswar	Bhubaneswar	Vaishnava temple built by Queen Chandrika, daughter of Anangabhimadeva III, of the Eastern Ganga dynasty	
Atharanala Bridge	c.1300	Atharanala, Puri	Puri; 19°49′11″N 85°49′54.1″E	Bridge with 18 arches, purportedly built by Narasingha Deva II of Eastern Ganga Dynasty	
Biraja Temple, Jajpur	13th Century		Built originally by Jajati Keshari of Soma Dynasty		
Annakoteshvara Temple	16th Century		Latadeipur, Gondia, Dhenkanal	Shiva temple built during the reign of the Gajapati dynasty	
Alarnath Temple	1610 AD		Brahmagiri, Puri, 752011		
Baladevjew Temple	1707		Kendrapara	Temple built during Maratha occupation of Odish	
Qadam-e-Rasool	1718		Cuttack	Mosque built by Shuja-ud-Din Muhammad Khan. Purportedly contains a Qadam Rasul (footprint of Muhammad).	

== Colonial ==
Site	Date(s)	Picture	Location	Description	References
Joranda Gadi	Early 20th century		Joranda, Dhenkanal	Contains the samadhi of the founder of the Mahima Dharma sect.	
Inchudi	1930		Balasore	Site of Salt Satyagraha in the state	

== See also ==
- History of Odisha
- List of heritage sites in Odisha
