= Asurgarh =

- Coordinates: 20.095410°N 83.344277°E
- Country: India
- State: Odisha
- District: Kalahandi

Asurgarh is an archaeological site in the Kalahandi district of Odisha, India. Asurgarh is one of the sites which has its beginning in around 5th century BCE to 5th century AD and emerged as one of the early urban fortified settlements in the region and it is older than Sisupalgarh. Pre-Mauryan, Mauryan and Gupta period coins are found in large number, these coins, discovered at Asurgarh, are categorized into two groups: 69 belong to the pre-Mauryan period, while 272 are from the Mauryan epoch and Gupta period. Excavations at Asurgarh in the Kalahandi district of Odisha have provided evidence suggesting that the earliest phase of fortification might belong to the Mauryan period. Among the findings was a piece of Chunar sandstone (a fine grained, reddish-buff coloured hard stone found in Uttar Pradesh) with the characteristic Mauryan polish, as well as various pottery items.

== Description ==
It is almost rectangular in shape, having four gates piercing the surrounding mammoth wall made of brick, rubble and earth. After the wall, a wide and deep moat girdles the fort on three sides respectively, the north, south and east. The fort area measures 24.29 hectares of land. On the west of the fort, the river Sandol flows close to the western rampart towards north to meet the river Utei, a tributary of the Tel, at a distance of about 3 km from the fort site.

Close to the eastern ditch, the builders of the fort excavated a huge water reservoir measuring 200 acres of land. It is popularly known as Asursagar. It has been pointed out that the water of the reservoir could be trained into the ditch of the fort through two sluices gate. On the southwest corner of the fort, another small tank was dug, which is known today as Radhasagar. The Habitation zone of the inhabitants is documented towards the south and north of the fort immediately after the fortified wall. Lowe town or habitation area is further superimposed by another mud wall within 100 hectares radius at each settlement zone, the mud wall has a single gate in the middle.

Archaeologists have unearthed artefacts believed to be 2,300-year-old while carrying out excavation at the Asurgarh Fort in Odisha’s Kalahandi district. DB Garnayak, Archaeological Survey of India, says Asurgarh is one of the sites which has its beginning in around 8th-9th century BC and emerged as one of the early urban fortified settlements in the region by the efforts of tribal and non-tribal inhabitants of the region. Lokesh Durga, Department of History of Delhi University, says Asurgarh settlement is older than Sisupalgarh and the first Urbanization process in Odisha started from Asurgarh. "Asurgarh" is a corrupted version of "Asokagarh," named after King Asoka of the Mauryan dynasty, who ruled in the 3rd century B.C. The site was an important center for the Atavika people during the 4th-5th centuries B.C. and in the 4th century A.D. whom Ashoka and Samudragupta had defeated.
