= Sitabhinji Group of Rock Shelters =

4th-century painting and archaeological site in northeast Odisha, India

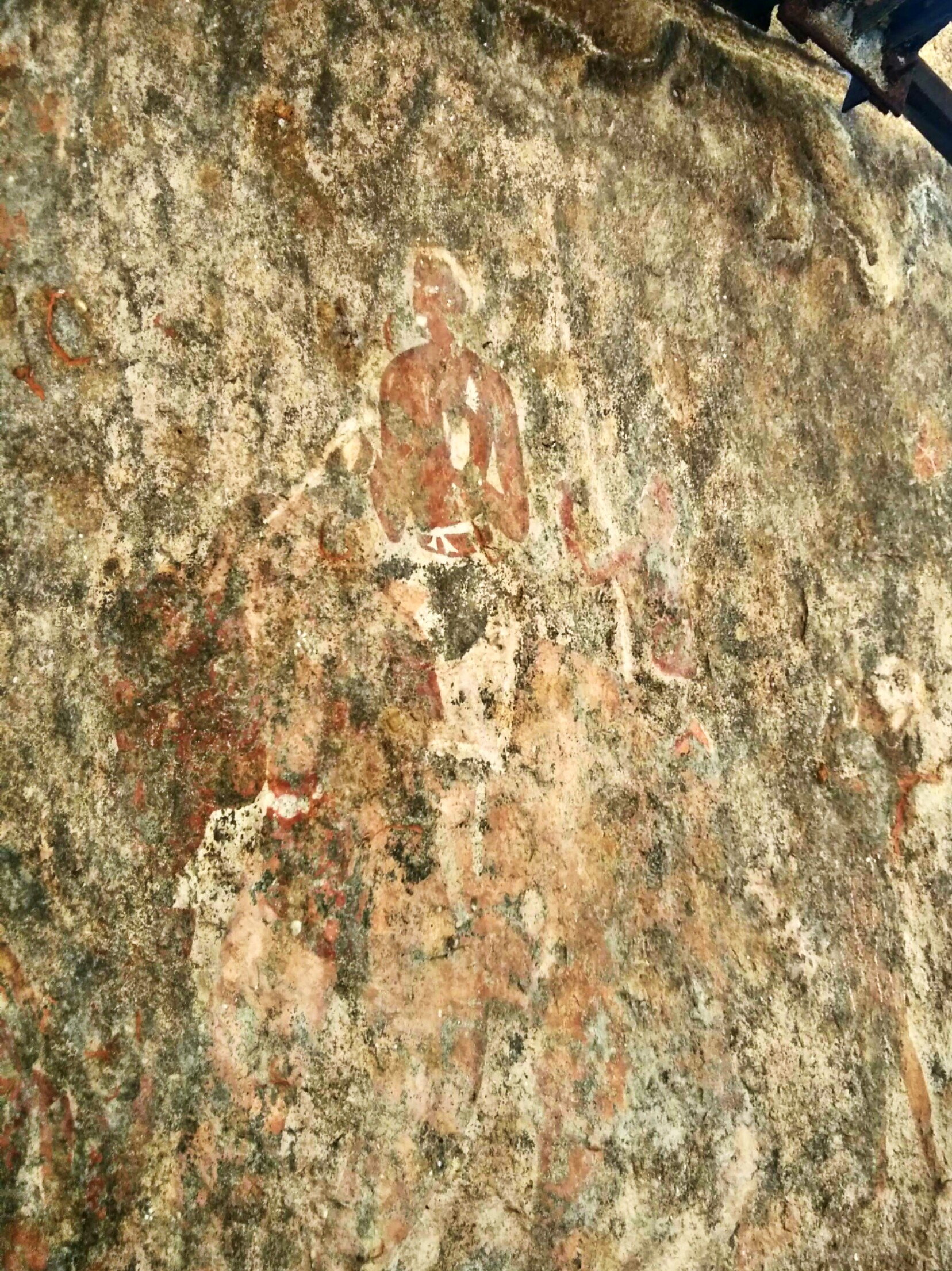
- The mural on Ravanachhaya rock

- Location within Odisha Location within India
- Coordinates: 21°30′35.2″N 85°46′38.5″E
- Features: 4th to 6th-century Tempera mural and inscriptions

The Sitabhinji Group of Rock Shelters, also referred to as the Ravanachhaya Mural Rocks, is a 4th to 6th century CE rock-cut monument with a major painted mural and inscriptions near Danguapasi village of Kendujhar (Keonjhar) district of Odisha. Archaeological excavations after the 1950s have unearthed boulder sections with additional inscriptions in Sanskrit and early Odiya, coins and parts of pre-8th-century Hindu temple and artwork from the Bhanja dynasty.

The 4th-century Ravanachhaya painted mural is notable for one of the earliest tempera painting (chitra) in India, for its non-religious portrayal of a king's procession, as well as its Sanskrit inscription in the emerging eastern branch of the northern script. The other notable discoveries here include the late-Gupta chaturmukha (four faced) Shiva Linga dated to around the 5th or 6th-century CE.

The Sitabhinji Group of Rock Shelters site is managed and protected by the Archaeological Survey of India (N-OR-32).

== Location ==
Sitabinji is located on the southeast side of Danguapasi village, about 30 kilometers south of Keonjhar town, and 10 kilometers west of Dhenkikot. It is north of the Sita-nadi (Seta) river, midst farms punctuated by huge boulders and a forested hilly terrain. The site is well marked for visitors and consists of several group of rocks to the west and northwest of the Surpanakha temple. These are not caves, but are open natural and partly rock-cut shelters. The entire area including the temple and different rocks-group are named after the characters or events in the Hindu epic Ramayana (Ravana, Surpanakha, Rama, Sita, Lakshmana, Lava, Kusa, others). One of these rock-shelters has a large multi-colored painted mural called the Ravanachhaya fresco site, while others are smaller and have minor inscriptions and single color painted marks. Ruins can be seen at this site, with major ones excavated at this site – such as the many-face Shiva linga, elephant with a baby, and others – are now at the temple.

== Description ==
This Ravanachhaya rock-shelter consists of two large boulders stacked one above another, with the shape of a half-umbrella. The under-side of this naturally covered portion of the rock was cut, then smoothened and then inscribed and painted around the 4th-century CE. This smooth cut surface stands 22 feet above the ground and projects about 15 feet. The original painting spanned over 25 feet by 10 feet. There is a natural crack in the lower rock which likely emerged from natural causes and caused a portion of the original mural to be more exposed to the deleterious climate and damage. The other side of the mural remains preserved, though it was covered by tropical insect nests and cocoons at the time of re-discovery by archaeologists in mid 20th-century. The surviving portion of the mural is about 17 feet by 10 feet. The painter(s) chose to write the inscription first and then paint over it, which has helped date the mural.

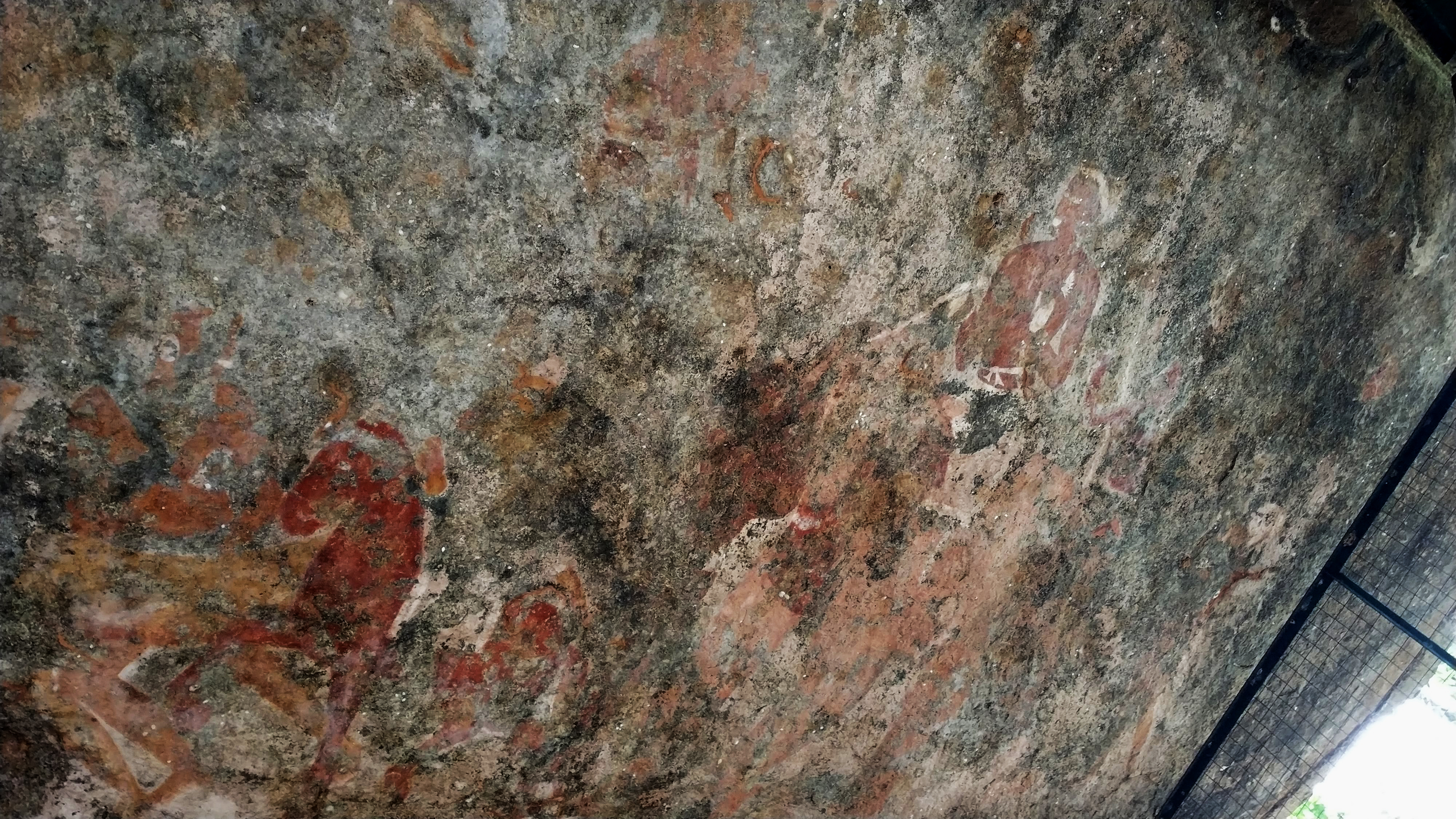
A part of the mural

The small inscription on the mural consists of two lines, which is in Sanskrit. The top line reads "Maharaja Sri Disa Bhmaja". Second line is unclear. Above these is the mural that shows a royal procession. A king is riding an elephant, with his left hand holding a flower (water lily), and his right hand holds a goad. His attendant with a chamara and chatri sits to his back at a distance on the same elephant. In front are footmen, four in number. With these footmen is a horse with a cavalier. To the left and somewhat back of the elephant on foot is a woman, likely an attendant. There are traces of apsaras above. The inscription is below the horse.

The mural was painted in five colors – white, brown, red, yellow ochre and buff. The thin base has a buff shade. It is also the color of the dress of the footmen, turbans and the caparisons. The lips and eye lashes are in white, as are the jewelry, adornments, flower in the king's hand, and the lower part of the woman's dress. Brown is the color of the elephant's body. Deep red is the color of elephant's head and trunk, the horse, the traces of flying apsaras, the king and his attendant. Light red colored are the footmen, the cavalier and the female attendant. The first footman holds a parasol or banner. The painter successfully expressed the depth perspective and the horse in motion. The artist also painted a scenery, but much of that has faded away.

The Ravanachhaya mural used a tempera method for painting, state Ramachandran and scholars based on chemical analysis of its fragments. This process of making a chitra is one of the several discussed in early Indian texts on painting and the Sitabhanji site mural is one example.

The dating of the mural inscription has been controversial as little is known about the king mentioned, as well as disputes about the chronology and paleographic studies of the somewhat eroded inscription. He is either an early one about whom little is known, or a later one with a similar name who lived about the 8th century. According to Joshi, it is unlikely to be the later ruler and the epigraphical studies of all inscriptions in Utkala region, along with other discoveries found at this and nearby sites, support the c. 4th to 5th-century dating.

Other inscriptions and Gupta-era artwork

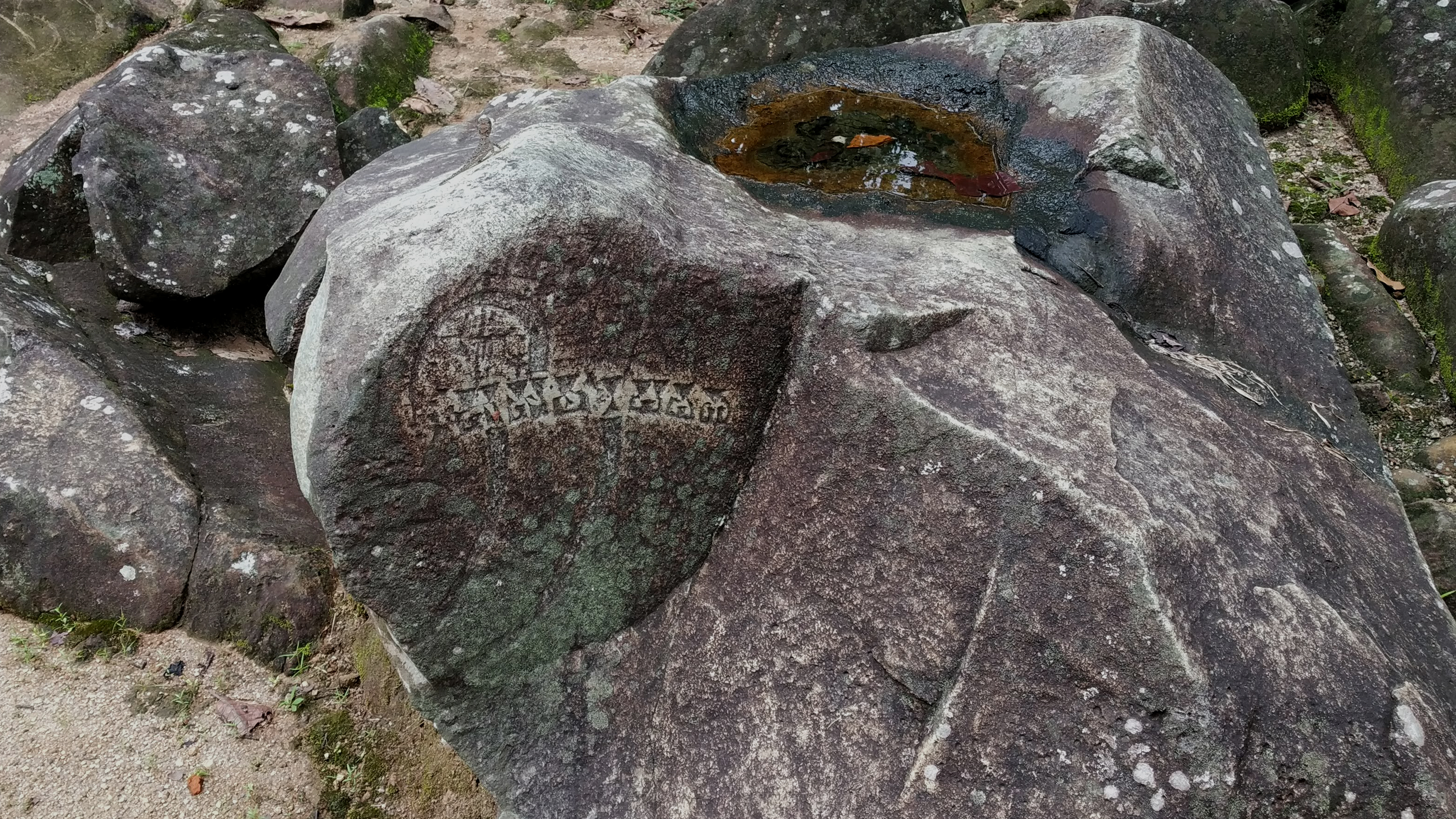
One of the other minors inscription of 5th or 6th-century Shaivism.

Other rock-shelter clusters near the Ravanachhaya mural site have historic inscriptions, some in early-Odiya as scripts were emerging out of the Brahmi, and others in variants that are now extinct. Most of Sanskrit, some inscriptions are in Prakrit language. These are short inscriptions that are Shaiva names, likely of pilgrims or monks from the Shiva tradition of Hinduism. The script style suggests that these are 5th to 6th-century inscriptions. Near these inscriptions, excavations have unearthed a mukhalinga (Shiva linga with face) made from soapstone in the late Gupta-style. The mukhalinga is now in the front of the nearby temple. It is nearly a square with rounded edges, has an effective diameter of about 1 feet. This linga is marked to be 2 feet in length above ground and 1 feet below for a total height of 3 feet. The faces are uniform, have the Gupta-style jata (hairdo) carving, shown as tucked in with flowers. The local Hindu community has preferred to leave it where it was discovered, which happens to be in front of a rock group historically called Surpanakha. A newer temple dedicated to Shiva is underneath it. Additional artwork found here include figurines made from soapstone in the early Gupta style. Coins unearthed were from the Puri-Kushan group. These attest to likely antiquity of the site, and that ideas about sculpture and painting likely diffused far from the northwest and central regions of India in the early centuries of the 1st-millennium CE.

According to Krishna Panigrahi, this site and nearby region were likely linked to Shaivism by about the mid-1st millennium and a Shaiva monastery given the inscriptions here that mentioned both the name of the teacher and student, the Shaiva artwork from the Gupta period and other Shaiva sites nearby in Keonjhar district such as Dengapoli and Asanapat (Satrubhanja inscription). Nothing discovered here shows a capital or major ancient town. Therefore, the presence of a partially surviving mural showing a king's procession is odd and likely a sign of its religious and political significance by mid-1st millennium.

== See also ==
- Jogimara and Sitabenga Caves
