= Rameshwar Deula =

Temple in Odisha, India

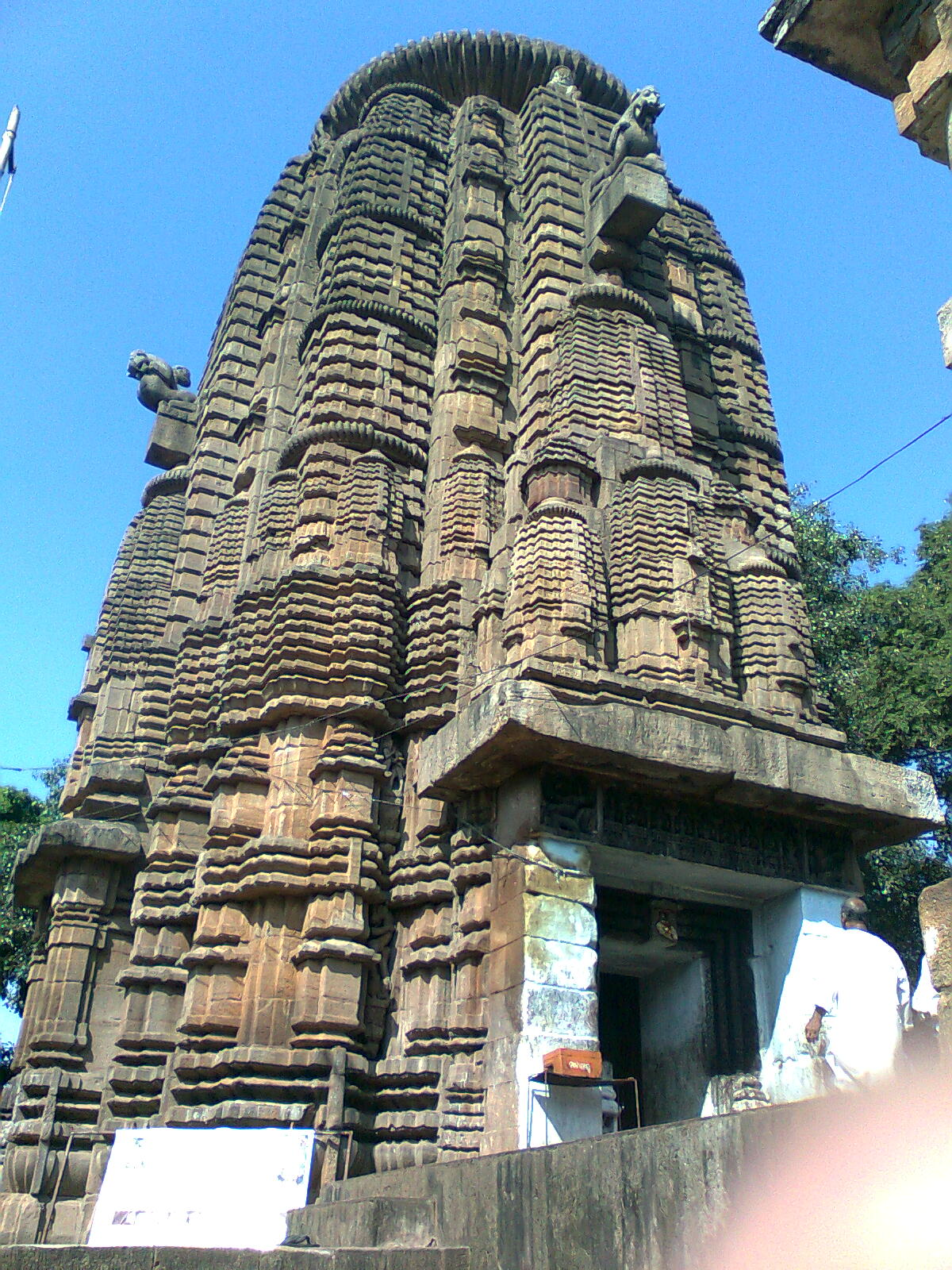

Religion
- Affiliation: Hinduism
- District: Bhubaneswar
- Deity: Rameshwar Deula

Location
- Location: Bhubaneswar
- State: Odisha
- Country: India
- Interactive map of Rameshwar Deula
- Coordinates: 20°15′12.49″N 85°50′9.30″E

The Rameshwar temple is very old temple in Bhubaneswar, Odisha, India, and known as the Mausi Maa temple of Lingaraj Temple. It is located from 2 km distance from Lingaraj shrine.

== Legend ==
Legend goes as when Rama was returning from Lanka after victory over Ravana, Goddess Sita asked to worship Shiva here. So Ramachandra built a Linga for that purpose. Traditionally during Ashokashtami, which falls one day before to Rama Navami in Chaitra Lord Lingaraja comes to this temple by a large chariot called Rukuna Rath and stays for four days. Historically the temple dates back to 9th century.

== Images ==
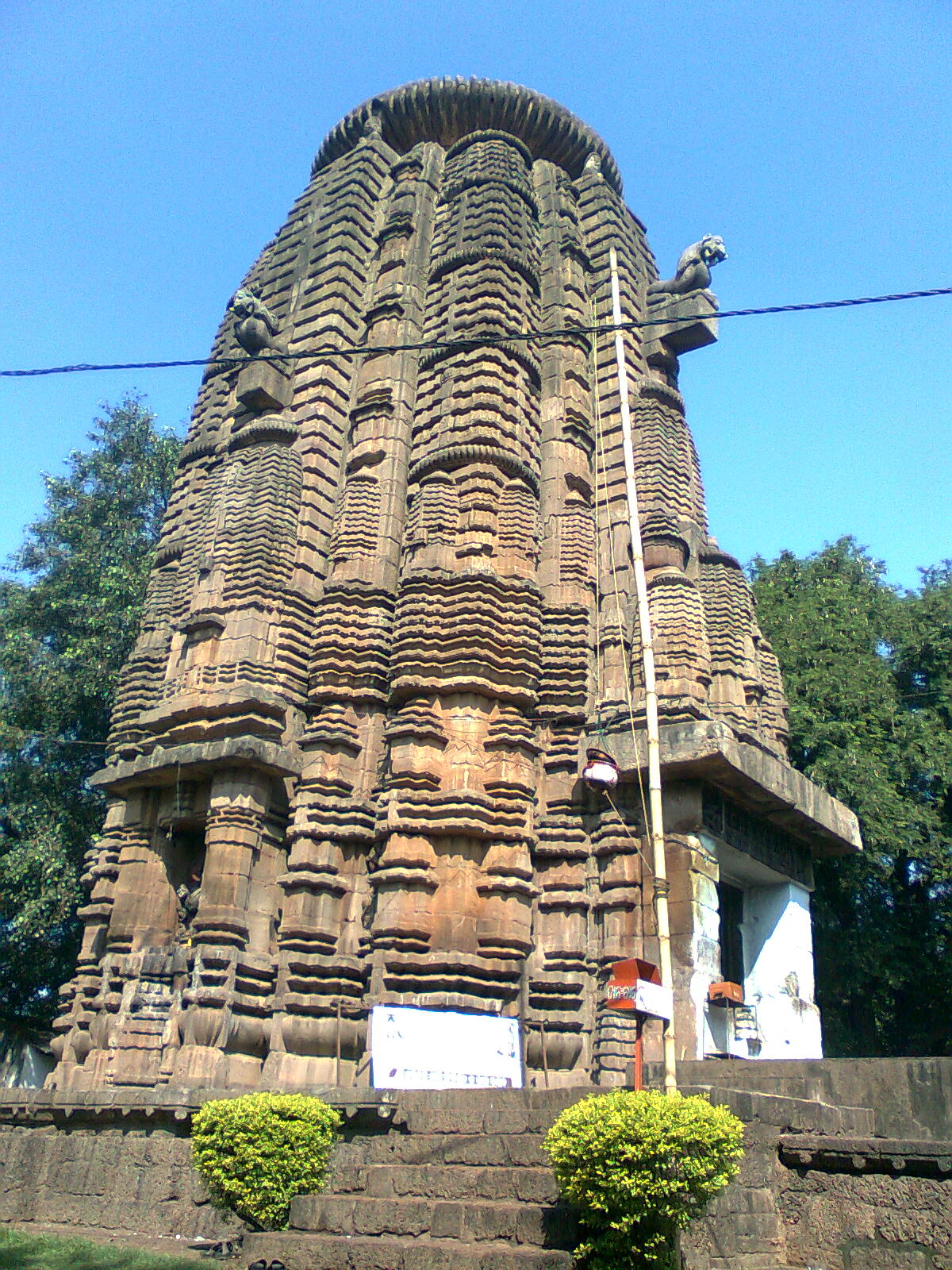

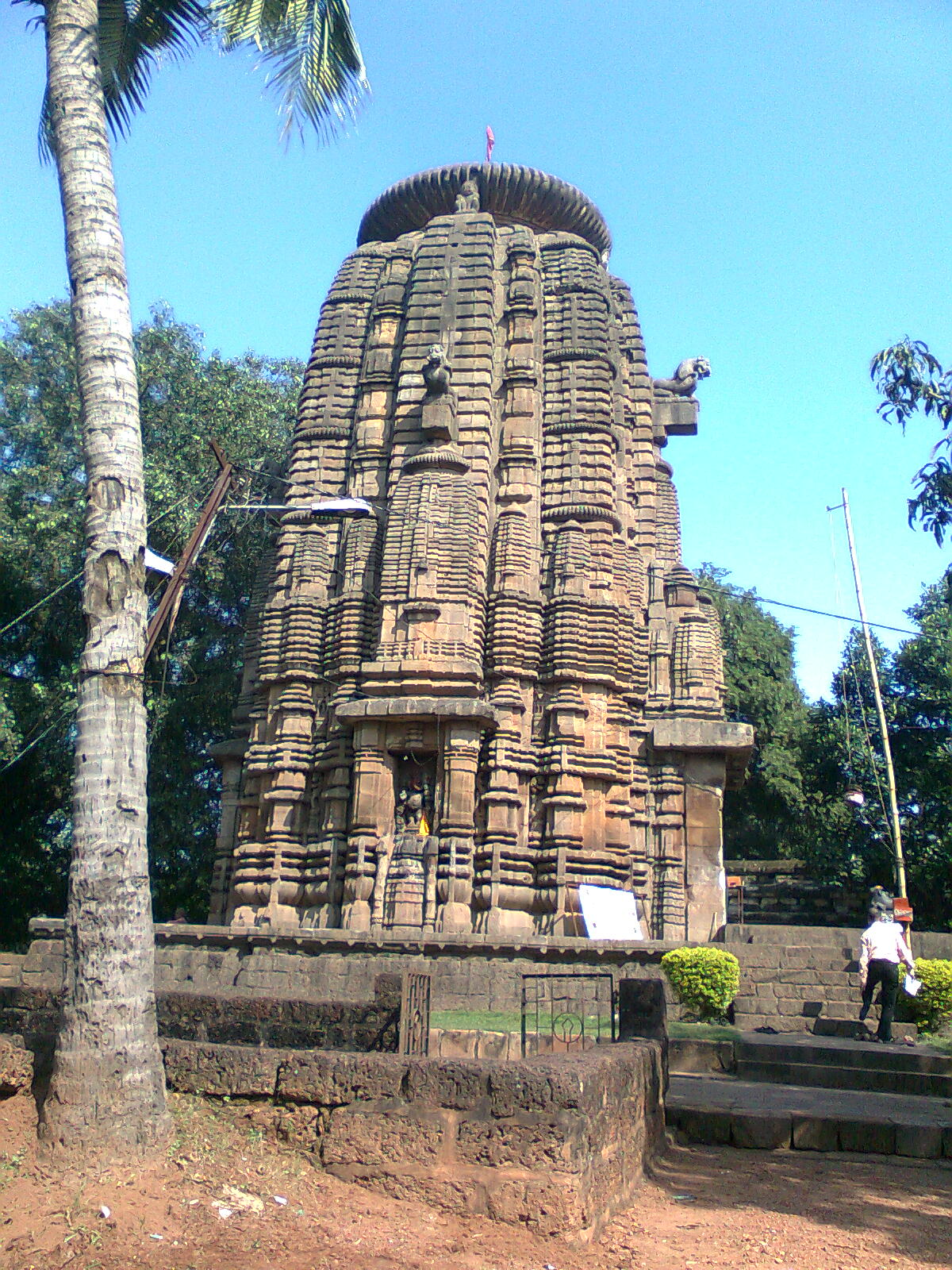

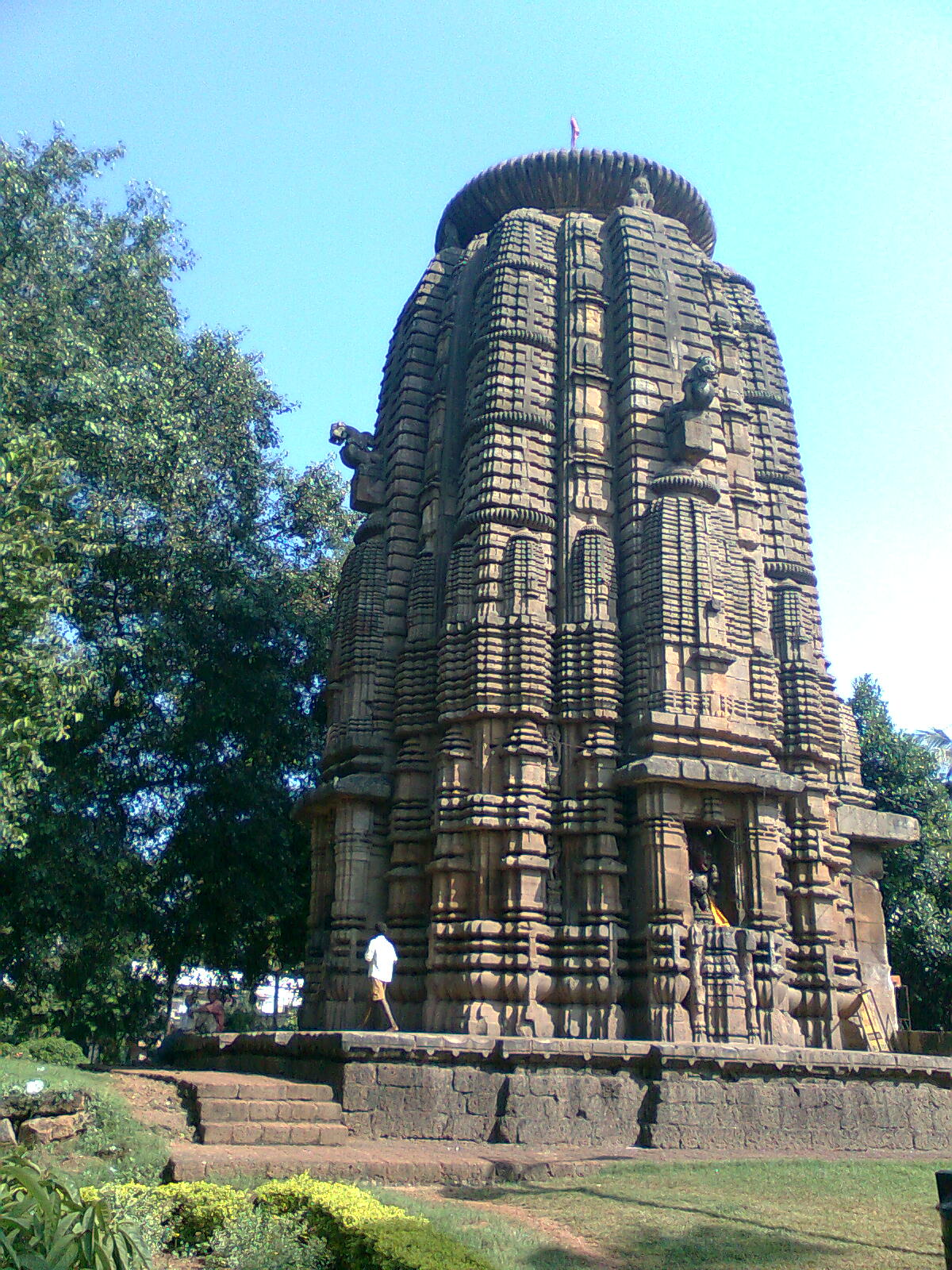

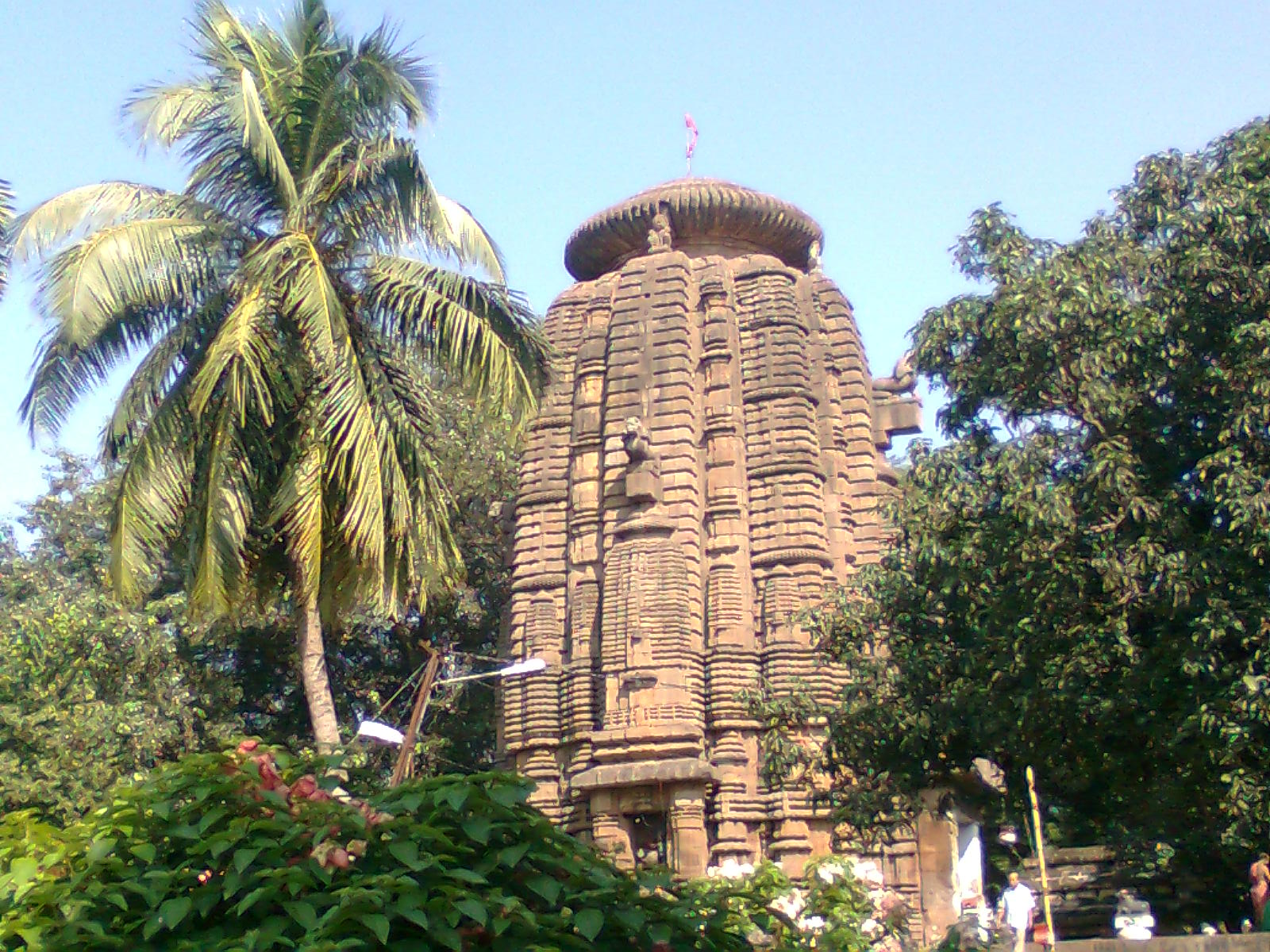

== See also ==
- List of temples in Bhubaneswar
