= List of State Protected Monuments in Odisha =

This is a list of State Protected Monuments as officially reported by and available through the website of the Archaeological Survey of India in the Indian state Odisha. The monument identifier is a combination of the abbreviation of the subdivision of the list (state, ASI circle) and the numbering as published on the website of the ASI. 218 State Protected Monuments have been recognized by the ASI in Odisha. Besides the State Protected Monuments, also the Monuments of National Importance in this state might be relevant.

== List of state protected monuments ==
SL. No.	Description	Location	Address	District	Coordinates	Image
S-OR-1	Jiminia Hillock	Sankarjanga		Angul		Upload Photo
S-OR-2	Pranabesvara Temple	Jadiamba		Angul		Upload Photo
S-OR-3	Sidhesvara Group of Temples	Deulijhari, Athamallick		Angul		Upload Photo
S-OR-4 N-OR-21	Vishnu Image	Rasol		Angul	85°04′37″N 21°05′35″E	Upload Photo
S-OR-5	Brahmani Temple	Avana		Balasore		Upload Photo
S-OR-6	Jagannatha Temple	Nilagiri		Balasore		Jagannatha Temple
S-OR-7	Khajuresvara Group of Temples	Seragarh		Balasore		Khajuresvara Group of Temples
S-OR-8	Khirachoraa Gopinatha Temple	Remuna		Balasore		Upload Photo
S-OR-9	Raibania Fort	Raibania, Jaleswar		Balasore		Upload Photo
S-OR-10	Scuipture shed	Ayodhya		Balasore		Upload Photo
S-OR-11	Shyamsundarji Temple	Balasore		Balasore		Upload Photo
S-OR-12	Nrushinghanatha Temple	Paikamala		Bargarh		Upload Photo
S-OR-13	Akhandalamani Temple	Aredi		Bhadrak		Upload Photo
S-OR-14	Baladevajiu Temple	Manjuri		Bhadrak		Upload Photo
S-OR-15	Bhadrakali Temple	Bhadrak		Bhadrak		Upload Photo
S-OR-16	Biranchinarayana Temple	Palia		Bhadrak		Upload Photo
S-OR-17	Buddha Image	Bonth		Bhadrak		Upload Photo
S-OR-18	Dapanayakani Temple	Shyamsundarpur		Bhadrak		Upload Photo
S-OR-19	Gouranga Temple	Gourangapur		Bhadrak		Upload Photo
S-OR-20	Kumaresvara Temple	Guamala		Bhadrak		Upload Photo
S-OR-21	Nahakani Temple	Bodak		Bhadrak		Upload Photo
S-OR-22	Ramesvara Temple	Rahandia		Bhadrak		Upload Photo
S-OR-23	Ramesvara Temple			Bhadrak		Upload Photo
S-OR-24	Satabhauni Temple	Haripur		Bhadrak		Upload Photo
S-OR-25	Sculpture shed	Kaupur		Bhadrak		Upload Photo
S-OR-26	Indralatha Temple	Bolangir				Upload Photo
S-OR-27	Somesvara Temple	Bolangir				Upload Photo
S-OR-28	Buddha Image	Boudh				Upload Photo
S-OR-29	Angesvara Temple	Cuttack				Upload Photo
S-OR-30	Bhadresvara Temple	Cuttack				Upload Photo
S-OR-31	Bindo Bihan Jiu Temple	Cuttack				Upload Photo
S-OR-32	Visvanatha Temple	Cuttack				Upload Photo
S-OR-33	Bokhari Sahib Mosque	Cuttack				Upload Photo
S-OR-34	Bramha Temple	Cuttack				Upload Photo
S-OR-35	Bramhabana	Cuttack				Upload Photo
S-OR-36	Budhalinga Temple	Cuttack				Upload Photo
S-OR-37	Durga Temple	Cuttack				Upload Photo
S-OR-38	Jagannatha Temple	Cuttack				Upload Photo
S-OR-39	Juma Mosque	Cuttack				Upload Photo
S-OR-40	Kalesvara Temple	Cuttack				Upload Photo
S-OR-41	Khiresvara Temple	Cuttack				Upload Photo
S-OR-42	Laxminarayan Temple	Cuttack				Upload Photo
S-OR-43	Madhavananda Temple	Cuttack				Upload Photo
S-OR-44	Manikesvara and Bhagabati Temple	Cuttack				Upload Photo
S-OR-45	Muktesvara Temple	Cuttack				Upload Photo
S-OR-46	Netaji Seva Sadan	Cuttack				Upload Photo
S-OR-47	Nilamadhava and Trivikram Vishnu	Cuttack				Upload Photo
S-OR-48	Padmapani Avalokitesvara Image	Cuttack				Upload Photo
S-OR-49	Paramahansa Temple	Cuttack				Paramahansa Temple
S-OR-50	Paschimesvara Temple	Cuttack				Upload Photo
S-OR-51	Paschimesvara Temple	Cuttack				Upload Photo
S-OR-52	Raghunatha Temple	Cuttack				Upload Photo
S-OR-53	Sahi Mosque	Cuttack				Upload Photo
S-OR-54	Siddhesvara Temple	Cuttack				Upload Photo
S-OR-55	Svapnesvara Temple	Cuttack				Upload Photo
S-OR-56	Sobhanesvara Temple	Cuttack				Upload Photo
S-OR-57	Stone inscription of Gopinathajiu	Cutack				Upload Photo
S-OR-58	Swaraj Ashram	Cuttack				Upload Photo
S-OR-59	Trutiyadeva Temple	Cuttack				Upload Photo
S-OR-60	Uttaresvara Temple	Cuttack				Upload Photo
S-OR-61	Vaishnavi and Bana Durga Image	Cuttack				Upload Photo
S-OR-62	Hanumana Temple	Cuttack				Hanumana Temple
S-OR-63	Yajnesvara Temple	Dhenkanal				Upload Photo
S-OR-64	Nadara Ramachandi Temple	Dhenkanal				Nadara Ramachandi Temple
S-OR-65	Jagannatha Temple	Dhenkanal				Upload Photo
S-OR-66	Paschimesvara Group to Temples	Dhenkanal				Upload Photo
S-OR-67	Sidhesvara Temple	Dhenkanal				Upload Photo
S-OR-68	Somnatha Temple	Dhenkanal				Upload Photo
S-OR-69	Hanumana Temple	Gajapati				Upload Photo
S-OR-70	Biranchinarayana Temple	Ganjam				Biranchinarayana Temple
S-OR-71	Cemetery	Ganjam				Upload Photo
S-OR-72	Ganjam Fort	Ganjam				Upload Photo
S-OR-73	Group of Siva Temples	Ganjam				Group of Siva Temples
S-OR-74	Jagannatha Temple	Ganjam				Upload Photo
S-OR-75	Jagannatha Temple	Ganjam				Upload Photo
S-OR-76	Ramapada Temple	Ganjam				Upload Photo
S-OR-77	Uttaresvara Temple	Ganjam				Upload Photo
S-OR-78	Basudeva Image	Jagatsinghpur				Upload Photo
S-OR-79	Chandrasekhar & Ganesha Temple	Jagatsinghpur				Upload Photo
S-OR-80	Kantaresvara Temple	Jagatsinghpur				Upload Photo
S-OR-81	Kapilesvara Mahadeva Temple	Jagatsinghpur				Upload Photo
S-OR-82	Khandesvara Temple	Jagatsinghpur				Upload Photo
S-OR-83	Kuttamachandi Temple	Jagatsinghpur				Upload Photo
S-OR-84	Loose Sculptures	Jagatsinghpur				Upload Photo
S-OR-85	Nagesvari Thakurani Temple	Jagatsinghpur				Upload Photo
S-OR-86	Nandikesvara Temple	Jagatsinghpur				Upload Photo
S-OR-87	Panchupandava Temple	Jagatsinghpur				Upload Photo
S-OR-88	Parasara Temple	Jagatsinghpur				Upload Photo
S-OR-89	Radhamadhavajiu Temple	Jagatsinghpur				Upload Photo
S-OR-90	Saptamatruka &Ajaikapada	Jagatsinghpur				Upload Photo
S-OR-91	Sarala Temple	Jagatsinghpur				Upload Photo
S-OR-92	Sculpture Shed	Jagatsinghpur				Upload Photo
S-OR-93	Sisuananta Temple	Jagatsinghpur				Upload Photo
S-OR-94	Svapnesvara Temple	Jagatsinghpur				Upload Photo
S-OR-95	Subamesvara Temple	Jagatsinghpur				Upload Photo
S-OR-96	Trilochanesvara Temple	Jagatsinghpur				Upload Photo
S-OR-97	Amarabati Temple	Jajpur				Upload Photo
S-OR-98	Dasasvamedhaghata	Jajpur				Upload Photo
S-OR-99	Gopinathajiu Temple	Jajpur				Upload Photo
S-OR-100	Jagannathjiu Temple	Jajpur				Upload Photo
S-OR-101	Raghunathajiu Temple	Jajpur				Upload Photo
S-OR-102	Suabarnesvara Temple	Jajpur				Upload Photo
S-OR-103	Teligarh	Jajpur				Upload Photo
S-OR-104	Varahanatha Temple	Jajpur				Upload Photo
S-OR-105	Viraja Temple	Jajpur				Upload Photo
S-OR-106	Dhavalesvara and Chandi Temple	Kalahandi				Upload Photo
S-OR-107	Manikesvari Temple	Kalahandi				Upload Photo
S-OR-108	Baladevjiu Temple	Kendrapara				Upload Photo
S-OR-109	Chandramauli Temple	Kendrapara				Upload Photo
S-OR-110	Dadhibamana Temple	Kendrapara				Upload Photo
S-OR-111	Golakbihari Temple	Kendrapara				Upload Photo
S-OR-112	Laxmivaraha Temple	Kendrapara				Upload Photo
S-OR-113	Baladevjiu Temple	Keonjhar				Upload Photo
S-OR-114	Kosalesvara Temple	Keonjhar				Upload Photo
S-OR-115	Trivenisvara Temple	Banamalipur		Khordha	86°01′20″N 20°10′23″E	Upload Photo
S-OR-116	Aishanyesvara Temple	Old town, Bhubaneswar		Khordha		Upload Photo
S-OR-117	Akhandalesvara Temple	Prataparudrapur		Khordha		Upload Photo
S-OR-118	Balaram Temple	Tangi		Khordha		Upload Photo
S-OR-119	Bankadagada	Niladriprasad		Khordha		Upload Photo
S-OR-120	Bhagavati Temple	Banapur		Khordha		Upload Photo
S-OR-121	Bhabanisankara Temple	Old town, Bhubaneswar		Khordha		Upload Photo
S-OR-122	Bhairangesvara Temple	Dhauli, Bhubaneswar		Khordha		Upload Photo
S-OR-123	Bualigarh	Chandaka		Khordha		Upload Photo
S-OR-124	Budhakesvara Temple	Deulidharpur		Khordha		Upload Photo
S-OR-125	Budhanatha Temple	Garedipanchana		Khordha		Upload Photo
S-OR-126	Chandesvara Temple	Chandesvar		Khordha		Upload Photo
S-OR-127	Chandi Temple	Kenduli		Khordha		Upload Photo
S-OR-128	Dakara Bhivisanesvara Temple	Bhubaneswar		Khordha		Upload Photo
S-OR-129	Dhavalesvara Temple	Dhauli		Khordha		Upload Photo
S-OR-130	Dvarabasini Temple	Old town, Bhuibaneswar		Khordha		Upload Photo
S-OR-131	Gopinatha Temple	Sarakana		Khordha		Upload Photo
S-OR-132	Gopinatha Temple			Khordha		Upload Photo
S-OR-133	Harihara Temple	Nairi		Khordha		Upload Photo
S-OR-134	Jagatarmohana Temple	Ramesvar		Khordha		Upload Photo
S-OR-135	Jalesvara Temple	Golbai		Khordha		Upload Photo
S-OR-136	Jalesvara Temple	Kalarahanga		Khordha		Upload Photo
S-OR-137	Anantavasudeva Temple			Khordha		Upload Photo
S-OR-138	Khurdha garh	Khurda		Khordha		Upload Photo
S-OR-139	Kunjabihari Temple	Bolgarh		Khordha		Upload Photo
S-OR-140	Kuntesvara Mahadeva Temple			Khordha		Upload Photo
S-OR-141	Lakshesvara Temple	Barimunda		Khordha		Upload Photo
S-OR-142	Lakshmi Nrusinghadeva Temple	Kalyanapur		Khordha		Upload Photo
S-OR-143	Laxmanesvar Group of Temples	Bhubaneswar		Khordha		Upload Photo
S-OR-144	Madhudesvara Temple	Deulidharpur		Khordha		Upload Photo
S-OR-145	Mohini Temple	Old town, Bhubaneswar		Khordha		Upload Photo
S-OR-146	Narasimha Temple	Kenduli		Khordha		Upload Photo
S-OR-147	Nikumabihari			Khordha		Upload Photo
S-OR-148	Nrusinghanatha Temple	Paribasudeipur		Khordha		Upload Photo
S-OR-149	Panchupandava Cave	Bhubaneswar		Khordha		Panchupandava Cave
S-OR-150	Radhamadhava Temple	Dadhimachhagadia		Khordha		Upload Photo
S-OR-151	Raghunatha Temple	Godipatna, Tangi		Khordha		Upload Photo
S-OR-152	Rajanahar	Old town, Bhubaneswar		Khordha		Upload Photo
S-OR-153	Ramachandi Temple	Narisha		Khordha		Upload Photo
S-OR-154	Ramanidhideva Temple	Ramesvar		Khordha		Upload Photo
S-OR-155	Somanath Temple	Budhapada		Khordha		Upload Photo
S-OR-156	Sidha Ganesha Temple	Dhauli		Khordha		Upload Photo
S-OR-157	Sikharachandi Temple	Patia		Khordha		Upload Photo
S-OR-158	Sukhmesvara Temple	Old town, Bhubaneswar		Khordha		Upload Photo
S-OR-159	Svarnajalesvara Temple	Old town, Bhuabaneswar		Khordha		Upload Photo
S-OR-160	Trimali matha	Kenduli		Khordha		Upload Photo
S-OR-161	Yakshya Image	Bhubaneswar		Khordha		Upload Photo
S-OR-162	Buddhist Structures			Khordha		Buddhist Structures
S-OR-163	Batrisha Simhasana	Koraput				Batrisha Simhasana
S-OR-164	Bhairavi Group of Temples	Koraput				Upload Photo
S-OR-165	Bairava Temple	Koraput				Upload Photo
S-OR-166	Ganesha Temple	Koraput				Upload Photo
S-OR-167	Jaina Temple	Koraput				Upload Photo
S-OR-168	Sarvesvara Temple	Koraput				Upload Photo
S-OR-169	Isanesvara Temple	Mayurbhanj				Upload Photo
S-OR-170	Kichakesvari Temple	Mayurbhanj				Upload Photo
S-OR-171	Mrutynjaya Temple	Mayurbhanj				Upload Photo
S-OR-172	Dadhivamana Temple	Nuapada				Upload Photo
S-OR-173	Jagannatha Temple	Nuapada				Upload Photo
S-OR-174	Patalesvara Temple	Nuapada				Upload Photo
S-OR-175	Raktambari Temple	Nuapada				Upload Photo
S-OR-176	Yogimatha, Rock Painting	Nuapada				Upload Photo
S-OR-177	Nilakanthesvara Temple	Nawarangapur				Upload Photo
S-OR-178	Bautidevi Temple	Nayagarh				Upload Photo
S-OR-179	Chandesvara Temple	Nayagarh				Upload Photo
S-OR-180	Jagannatha Temple	Nayagarh				Upload Photo
S-OR-181	Nilamadhava Temple	Nayagarh				Upload Photo
S-OR-182	Khilesvara Temple	Puri				Upload Photo
S-OR-183	Alarnatha Temple	Puri				Alarnatha Temple
S-OR-184	Amaresvara Temple	Puri				Upload Photo
S-OR-185	Baliharchandi Temple	Puri				Upload Photo
S-OR-186	Bhavakundalesvara Siva Temple	Puri				Upload Photo
S-OR-187	Budhanatha Temple	Puri				Upload Photo
S-OR-188-a	Buddhist Image	Puri				Upload Photo
S-OR-188-b	Avalokitesvara	Puri				Upload Photo
S-OR-188-c	Jambala	Puri				Upload Photo
S-OR-188-d	Tara	Puri				Upload Photo
S-OR-189	Excavated site of Kuruma	Puri				Excavated site of Kuruma
S-OR-190	Gambhira Radhakanta Matha	Puri				Upload Photo
S-OR-191	Gangesvari Temple	Bayalisabati, Puri				Gangesvari Temple
S-OR-192	Gatisvara Temple	Puri				Upload Photo
S-OR-193	Gopinatha Temple	Puri				Upload Photo
S-OR-194	Gopaljiu Temple	Puri				Upload Photo
S-OR-195	Gopinatha Temple	Puri				Upload Photo
S-OR-196	Gramesvara Temple	Puri				Upload Photo
S-OR-197	Granesvar Temple	Puri				Upload Photo
S-OR-198	Harachandi Temple	Puri				Upload Photo
S-OR-199	Kumaresvara Temple	Puri				Upload Photo
S-OR-200	Kunjabihari Temple	Puri				Upload Photo
S-OR-201	Isvaradeva Temple	Puri				Upload Photo
S-OR-202	Laxminarayana Temple	Puri				Upload Photo
S-OR-203	Mangala Temple	Puri				Upload Photo
S-OR-204	Nilakanthesvara Temple	Puri				Upload Photo
S-OR-205	Sabhamandap	Puri				Upload Photo
S-OR-206	Somanatha Temple	Puri				Upload Photo
S-OR-207	Somanatha Temple	Puri				Upload Photo
S-OR-208	Somanatha Temple	Puri				Upload Photo
S-OR-209	Somanatha Temple	Puri				Upload Photo
S-OR-210	Siddhabakula Matha	Puri				Upload Photo
S-OR-211	Vanivakresvara Temple	Puri				Upload Photo
S-OR-212	Mallikesvara Temple	Rayagada				Upload Photo
S-OR-213	Patalesvara Temple	Rayagada				Upload Photo
S-OR-214	Vimalesvara Temple	Sambalpur				Upload Photo
S-OR-215	Samalesvari Temple	Sambalpur				Upload Photo
S-OR-216	Kosalesvara Temple	Sambalpur				Upload Photo
S-OR-217	Jamesragarh	Sundargarh				Upload Photo
S-OR-218	Ramji Temple	Sundargarh				Upload Photo

== See also ==
- List of State Protected Monuments in India for other State Protected Monuments in India
- List of Monuments of National Importance in Odisha
