= Atharanala =

Bridge in Puri town, Odisha (India)

Atharanala ଅଠରନଳା
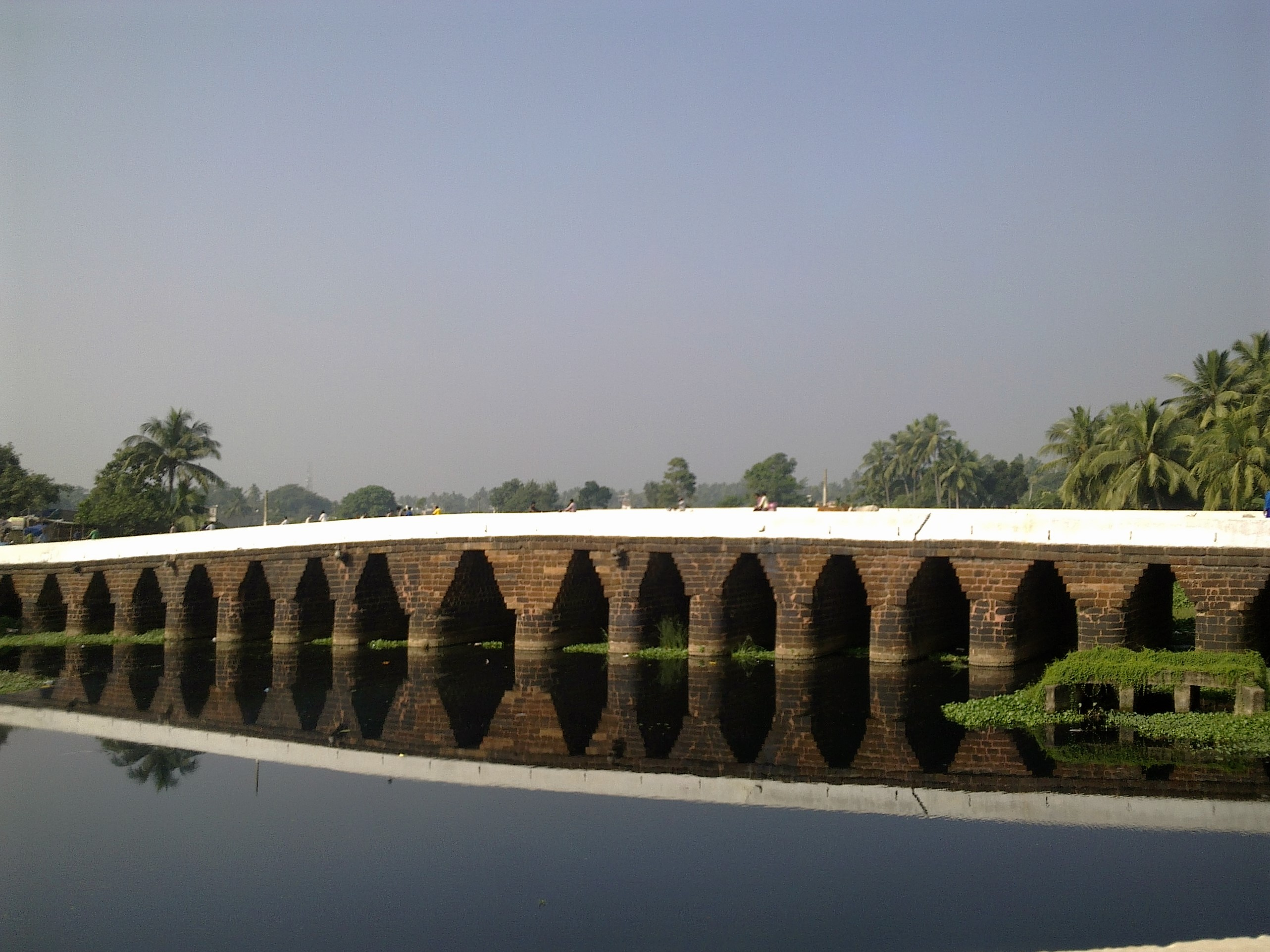
- Atharanala bridge viewed from NH-316
- Coordinates: 19.819810°N 85.831710°E
- Carries: light vehicles, pedestrians
- Crosses: Madhupur or Musa stream
- Locale: Puri town, Odisha, India
- Official name: Athara Nala (ଅଠରନଳା)
- Named for: Athara means 18 in Odia language, Nala Means Passage. There are 18 Passages under the bridge so the Name is AtharaNala (in Odia ଅଠର ନଳା)
- Heritage status: Monument of National Importance N-OR-64

Characteristics
- Design: medieval architectural scheme of pillars and arches; ashlar masonry
- Material: Laterite stone
- Trough construction: lime mortar
- Total length: 85,5 m
- Width: 12 m
- Height: 6,3 m
- Traversable?: no
- No. of spans: 18
- Piers in water: 19

History
- Construction start: second half of the 18th century AD

Location
- Interactive map of Atharanala

Atharanala (Odia: ଅଠରନଳା) - a historic laterite stone bridge over the Madhupur or Musa stream at the entrance to the city of Puri, Odisha (India) on Puri - Bhubaneswar road, locally known as Atharnala bridge; a Monument of National Importance N-OR-64 officially recognized by Archaeological Survey of India. Due to safety reasons the bridge is excluded from heavy vehicle traffic.

== History ==
According to the report of the Indira Gandhi National Centre for the Arts the structure was assigned to the second half of the 18th century AD (Maratha rule) based on architectural ground and building materials. The present bridge has been placed directly on top of the structure which had been started as early as 13th century AD by Bhanu Deva I (1266–1278) of the Eastern Ganga Dynasty and continued by Narasimha Deva II (1279–1306). He reconstructed the Atharanala bridge for proper discharge of surplus water of that time Saradhar rivulet with an additional culvert thus increasing its total number to nineteen (290 ft long).

== Legends ==
The bridge was built by Maharaja Indradyumna. The construction process was unsuccessful until, by the order of the Lord Jagannath, he offered the heads of his eighteen sons into the water of the river. If a non-Hindu is caught trespassing inside the Jagannath Temple in Puri the entire Prasad must be thrown away from Atharanala bridge.

== Architecture ==
Atharanala bridge is made of laterite and lime mortar with ashlar masonry building technique, in medieval architectural scheme of pillars and arches. It is oriented north to south. The bridge spreads over a length of 85 meter (280 feet) and breadth of 11 meter (36 feet) and encompasses eighteen arches ("athara" means eighteen, "nala" canals or passages) ranging from seven to sixteen feet across. The bridge offers a spectacular long distance view of the Jagannath Temple. The façade is decorated with reliefs of deities, people, nayikas, genre scenes and floral decorations: Brusaarudha Siva, Ekapada - Bhairava, Ardhanarisvara, Parvati, Gajabhisekha Laxmi, Durga Mahisasuramardini, bharabahaka, people playing musical instruments, sakha mouldings, Kartika, Navagraha panel, lotus medallions, elephant figures and boar hunting scenes.

== Maintenance ==
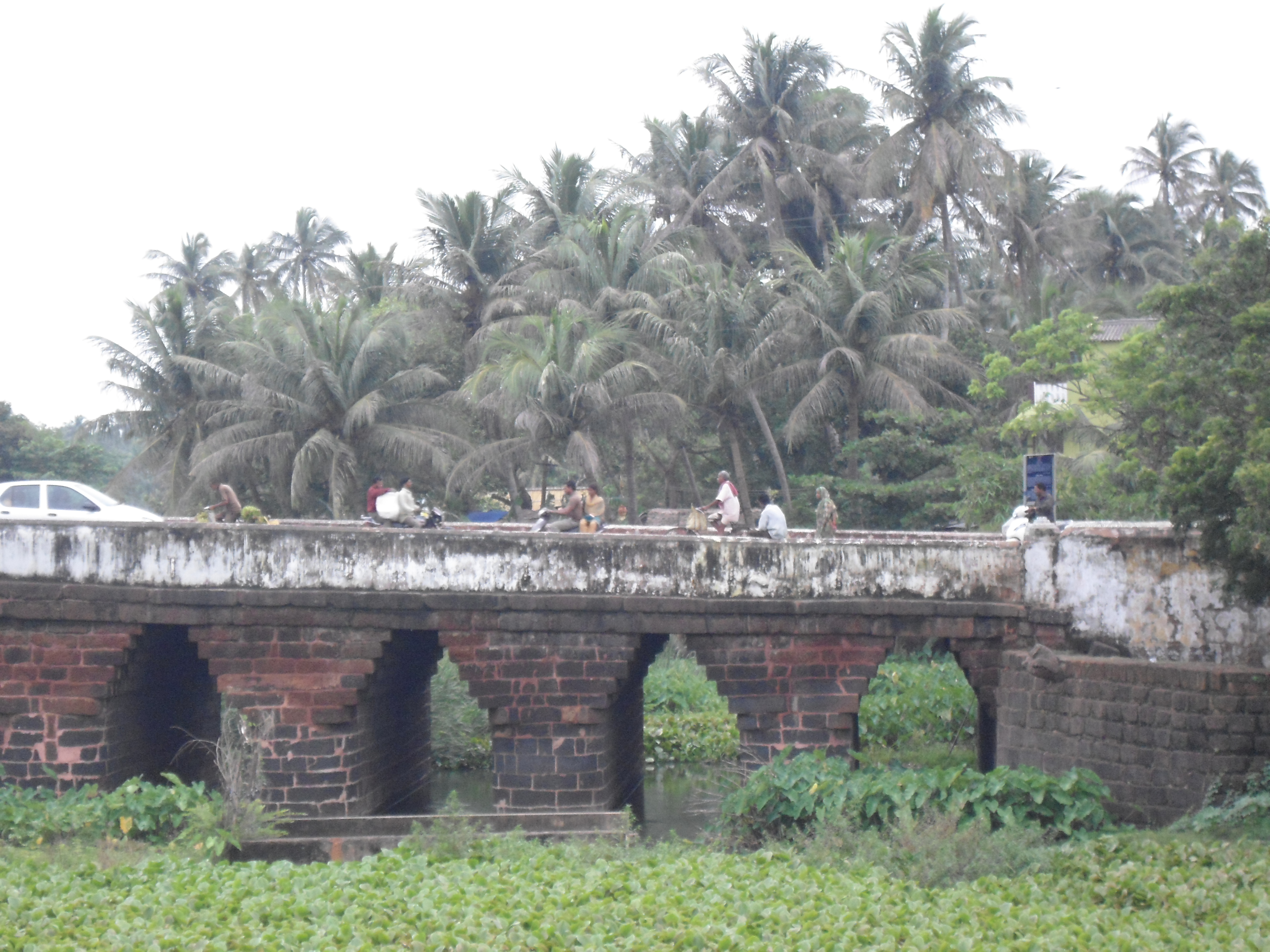
Atharanala Bridge in 2012

Renovated and repaired by Archaeological Survey of India the bridge was found in good condition. However, high siltation and growth of vegetation was gradually closing the openings of the bridge. The urban pressure was another risk identified. It was decided by the Odisha state government in 2014 (before Nabakalebara 2015) to start beautification of the bridge by removing the moss and mud heaped near the bridge and facilitate boating to attract tourists to the spot.

== See also ==
Geography of Puri
