= Sisupalgarh =

Ancient city of Odisha

Coordinates: 20°13′35.9″N 85°51′11.0″E

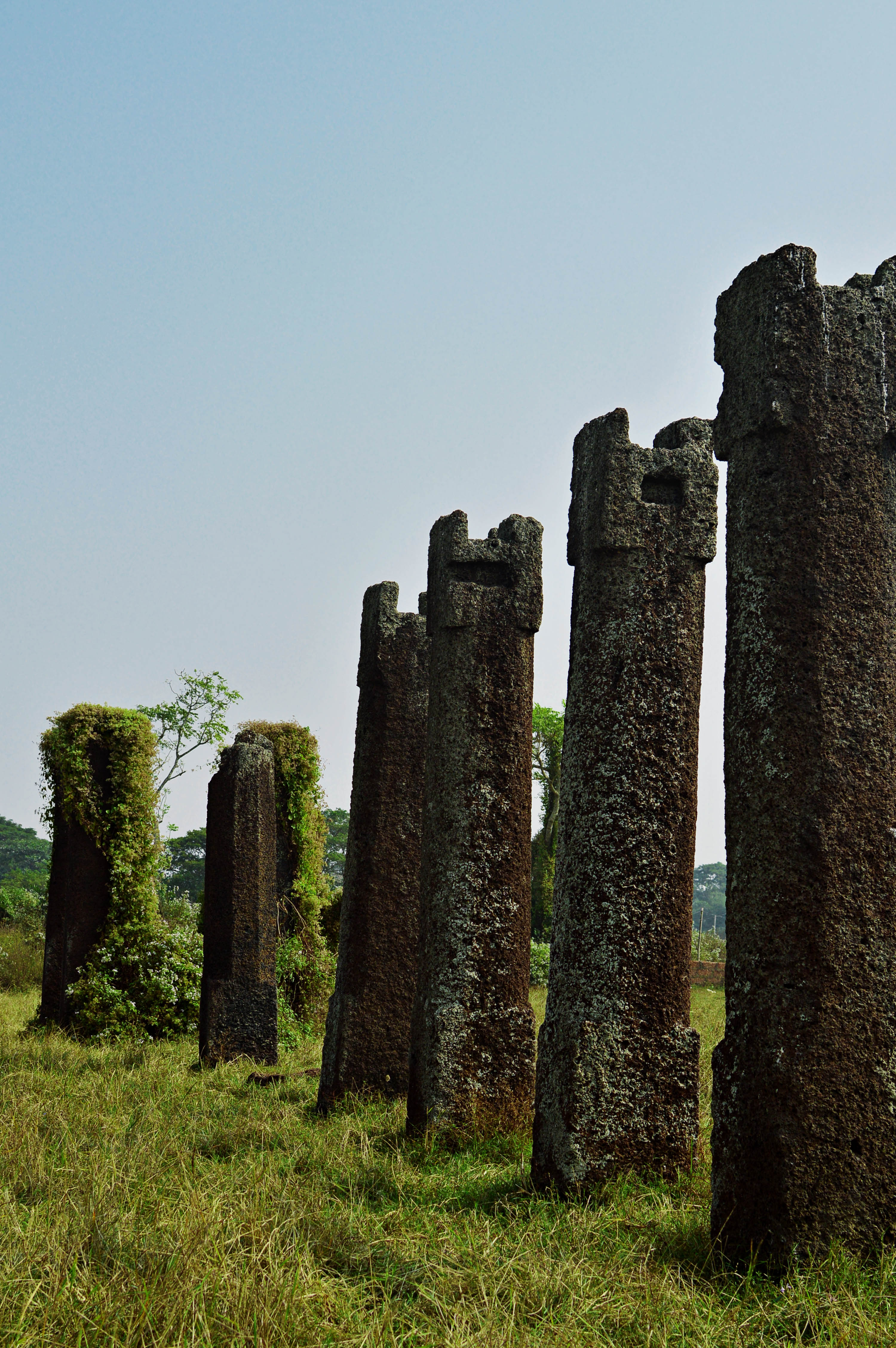
- Remains of pillars of Sisupalgarh fortified urban center, an ASI Listed Monument
- Interactive map of Sisupalgarh
- Type: Settlement
- Location: Bhubaneswar, Odisha, India
- Part of: Kalinga

History
- Built: 800 BCE to 500 BCE
- Abandoned: 4th Century CE

Site notes
- Excavation dates: 1948 by B.B. Lal
- Archaeologists: B.B. Lal, M.L. Smith, R.K. Mohanty, Paul Alan Yule

Sisupalgarh or Sisupalagada (Odia: [sisupaːl̪ɔɡɔɽɔ]) is situated in Khurda District in Odisha, India, and houses ruined fortifications. First inhabited around 7th to 6th centuries BCE, it is one of the largest and best-preserved early historic fortifications in India, and was once the capital of ancient Kalinga. It is identified with Kalinganagara of Kharavela and Tosali of Ashoka.

== Description ==
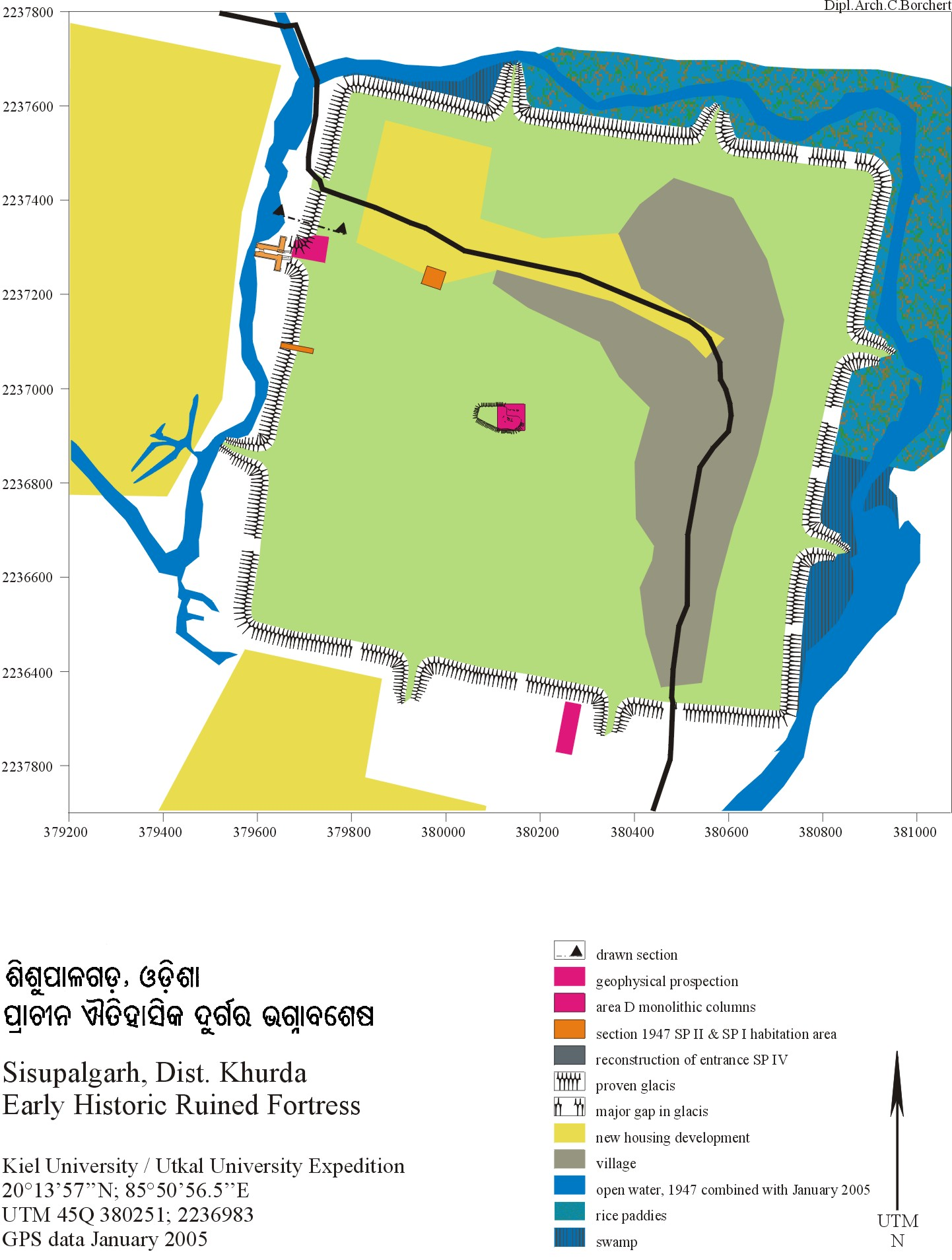
(Kiel Univ.)

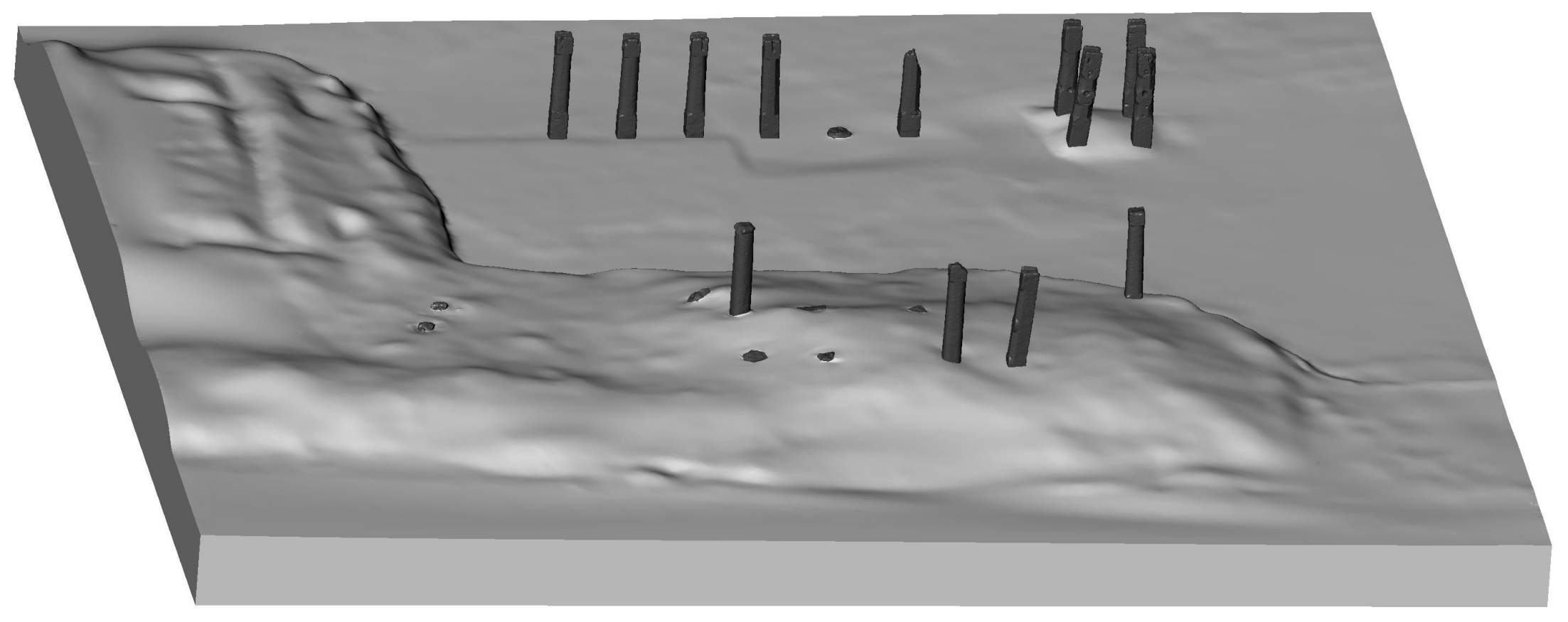
Area D ruin, 2004 (FH Mainz).

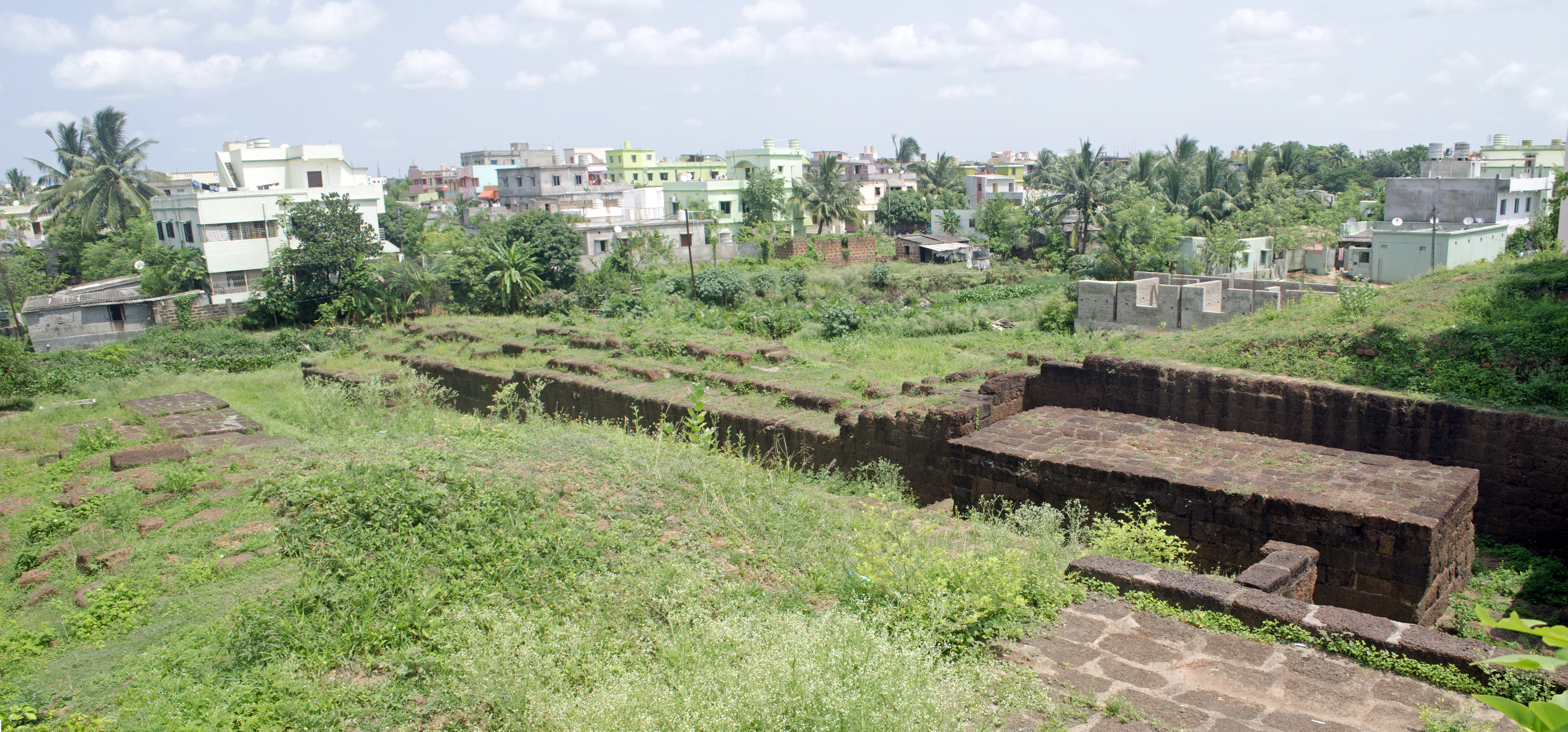
Ruins of Sisupalgarh being encroached by new buildings

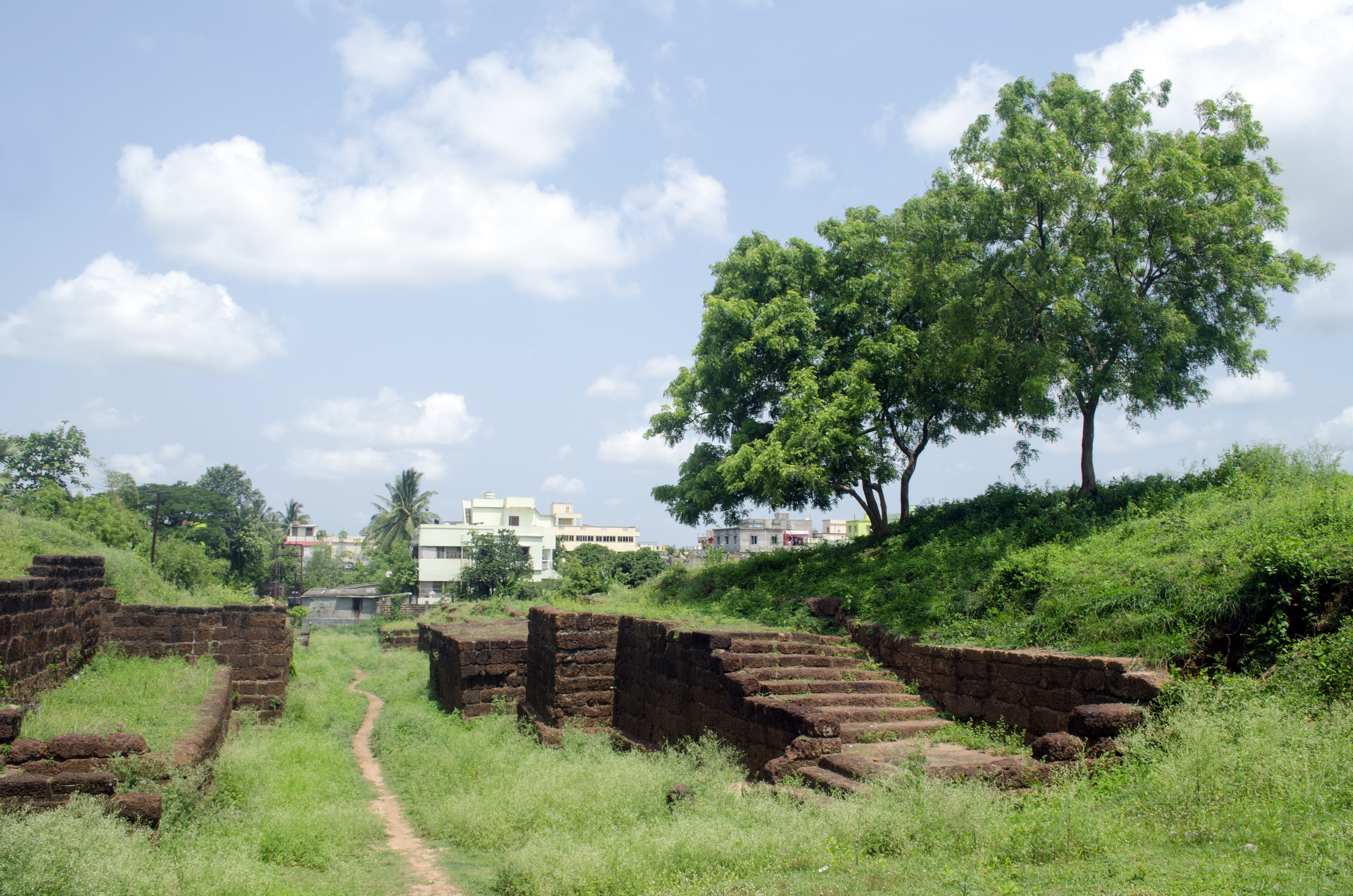
Ruins of the North West gate of Sisupalgarh

The remains of the ancient city Sisupalgarh has been discovered near Bhubaneswar, today, the capital of the Odisha state in India. Sisupalgarh was a nationally protected monument. On the basis of the architectural pattern and artefacts discovered during the early excavations, B. B. Lal concluded that this fort city flourished between 3rd century BC and 4th century AD. On the basis of the new findings, M.L. Smith and R. Mohanty claimed in 2001 that the fortified city flourished from around 5th century BC and probably lasted well after the 4th century. Thus, this defensive settlement originated prior to the Mauryan empire.

The population of the city could have amounted to 20,000 to 25,000. Archaeologists have employed geophysical survey, systematic surface collections and selected excavations in the 4.8 km perimeter of the fortified area and studied individual houses and civic as well as domestic architecture to arrive at the figure. The significance of the population is clear when one bears in mind that the population of classical Athens was 10,000. However the historians also claim that it is too early to comment on the population of the city as yet only a part of the city has been excavated.

== Excavations ==
The first excavations at the site were carried out by B.B. Lal in 1948. An American-Indian team took up work in 2001. In 2005 ground penetrating radar revealed the probable position of the southern moat. Toward the centre of the fortress (Area D) the 19 column structure has been recorded three-dimensionally by means of a laser scanner. It is disturbed and incomplete. Two gates pierce each of the glacis of the quadrangular plan. As at contemporary Jaugada, the plan tips 10° clockwise of north. With 1,125 m × 1,115 m (3,691 ft × 3,658 ft) (measured on the crest), Sisupalgarh is larger in surface than is Jaugada. Sisupalgarh's defences are the highest known of this period in India. The ancient settlement probably was not dense, but rather there was room inside the fortress to graze.

Excavations from 2005 to 2009 by M.L. Smith and R. Mohanty, reached bedrock or natural soil in some areas of the settlement, dating the earliest occupation around 7th to 6th centuries BCE in five different locations sampled, being the earliest C14 dating inside the city 804-669 BCE and outside 793-555 BCE, and the northern rampart was dated to 510-400 BCE.

== Preservation of the remains ==
In Lal's day this site was wilderness. The major portion of the land that constitutes the ancient enclosed settlement somehow went from a protected monument into private possession. Since the site is nationally protected, it lies within the bailiwick of the Archaeological Survey of India. In 2005 the Indo-German team documented considerable illegal building on this nationally protected site. Since 2002, yearly satellite images document the illegal house building especially in the north-western quarter which increased in tempo since 2010. Encroachment starts with the staking out of lots. Gradually, building materials is piled up. Foundation walls are laid. Then suddenly the house is erected as soon as possible before the officials can react. Since 2010 the developers have begun to build into the southern city wall and the officials seem to do nothing to counter this.

The well-known historian Karuna Sagar Behera has voiced serious concern over the preservation of material unearthed from the site and notes, "It is a shame that some gold coins and terracotta pottery found at the place during the first excavation in the late 1940s were subsequently lost." The loss of gold coins, is nothing in comparison to the wholesale development of the site by developers.

== Present Status ==
Presently Sisupalgarh is a neighborhood in the southern fringes of Bhubaneshwar. The archaeological site consists of two parts one is the northern gateway of the western wall and the other is the shola khamba (meaning 16 pillars). The gateway is only surviving gateway among the 8 gateways of the ancient citadel. The gateway which is in complete ruins was once a grand structure complete with guard houses and watch towers. The Shola Khamba Pillared complex is also referred to as Rani Mahal and was quite likely to be a portion of the royal palace. An excavation in 2008 revealed more pillars but the nature of the structure they formed cannot be ascertained. Presently both archaeological sites are under threat of encroachment with new construction coming up barely a couple of yards from the historical structures.

== Gallery ==
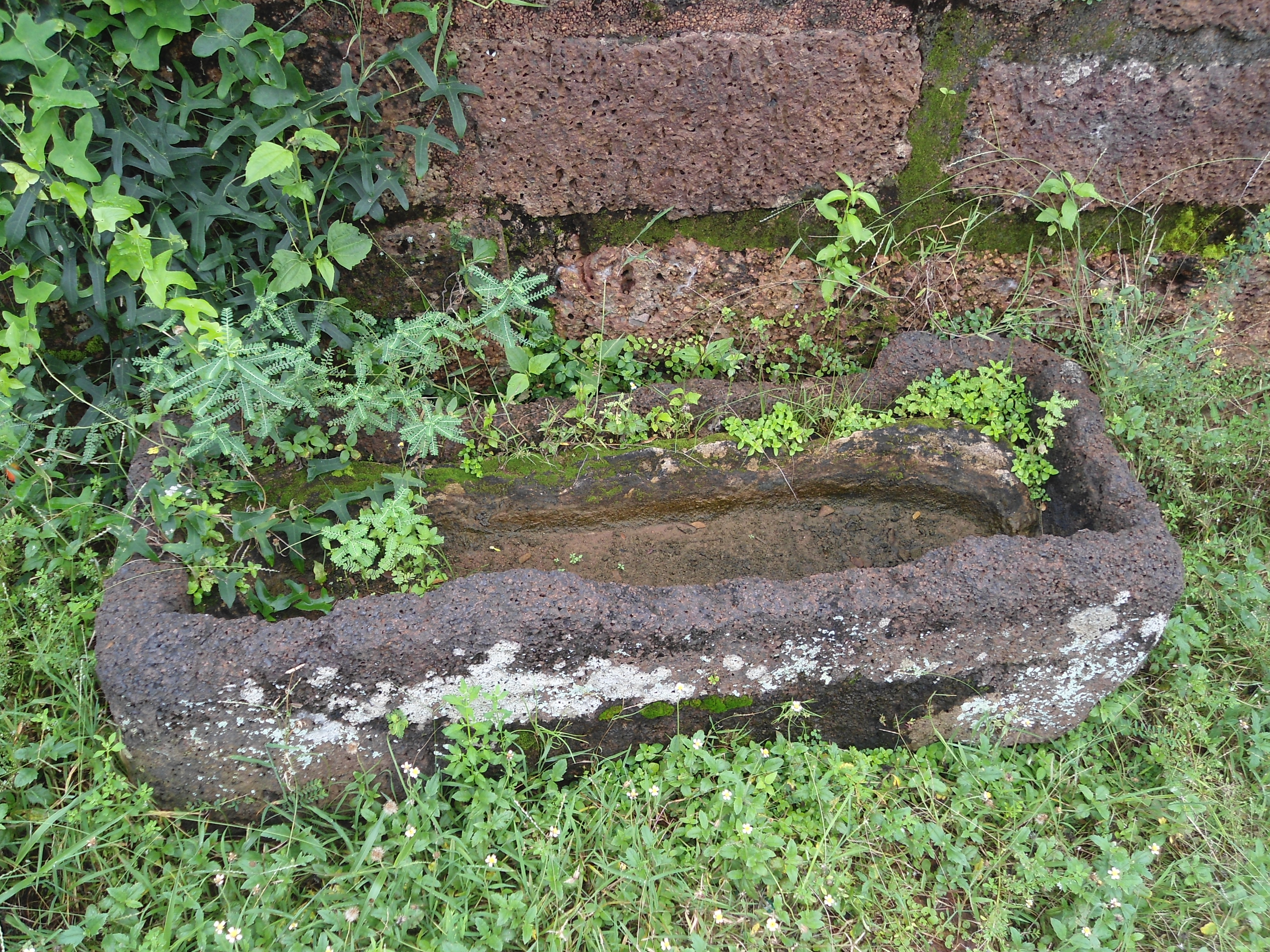
Scattered stones at Sisupalgarh site

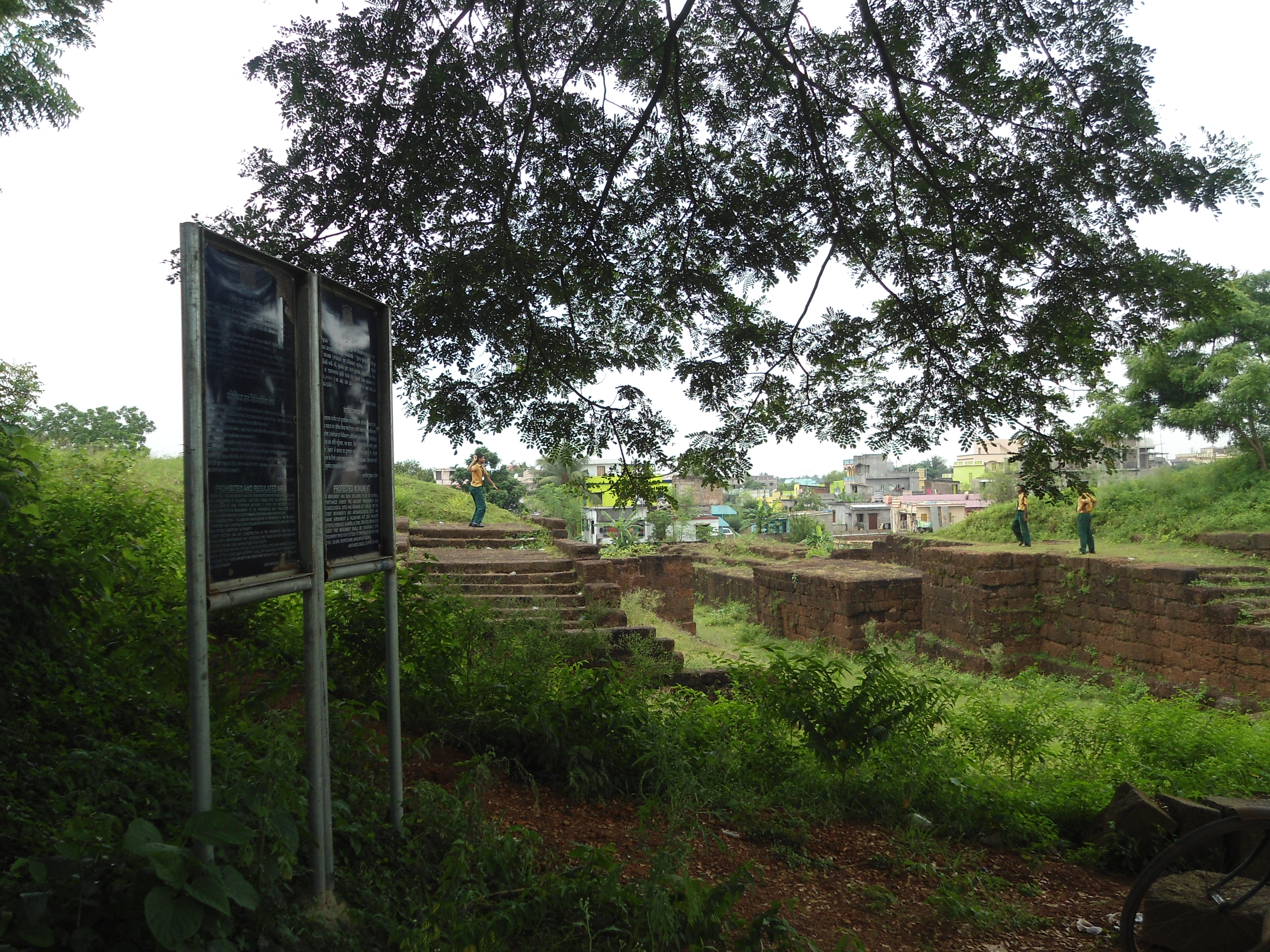
ASI boards at Sisupalgarh site

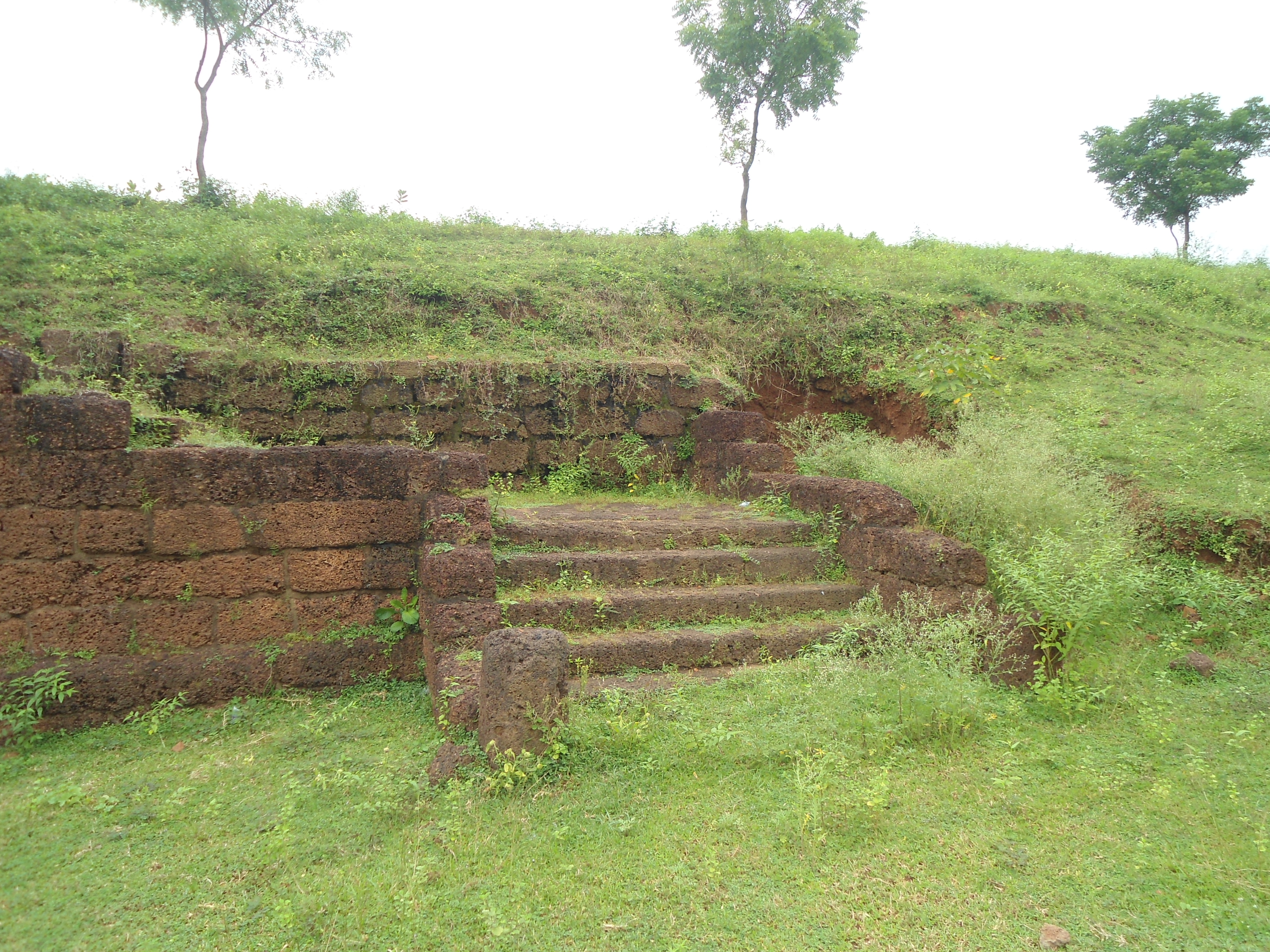
Ruins of the North West gate of Sisupalgarh

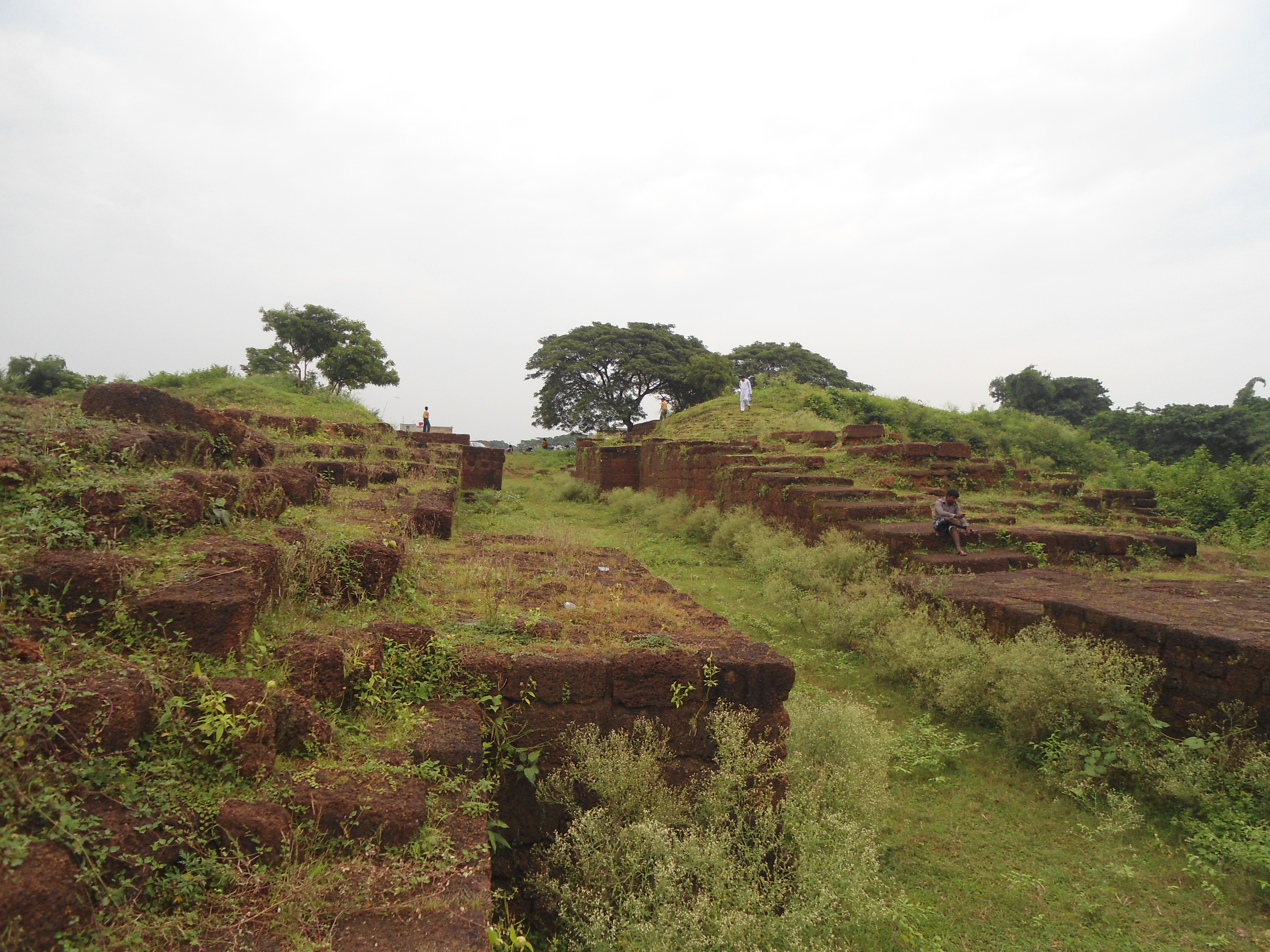
Ruins of the North West gate of Sisupalgarh

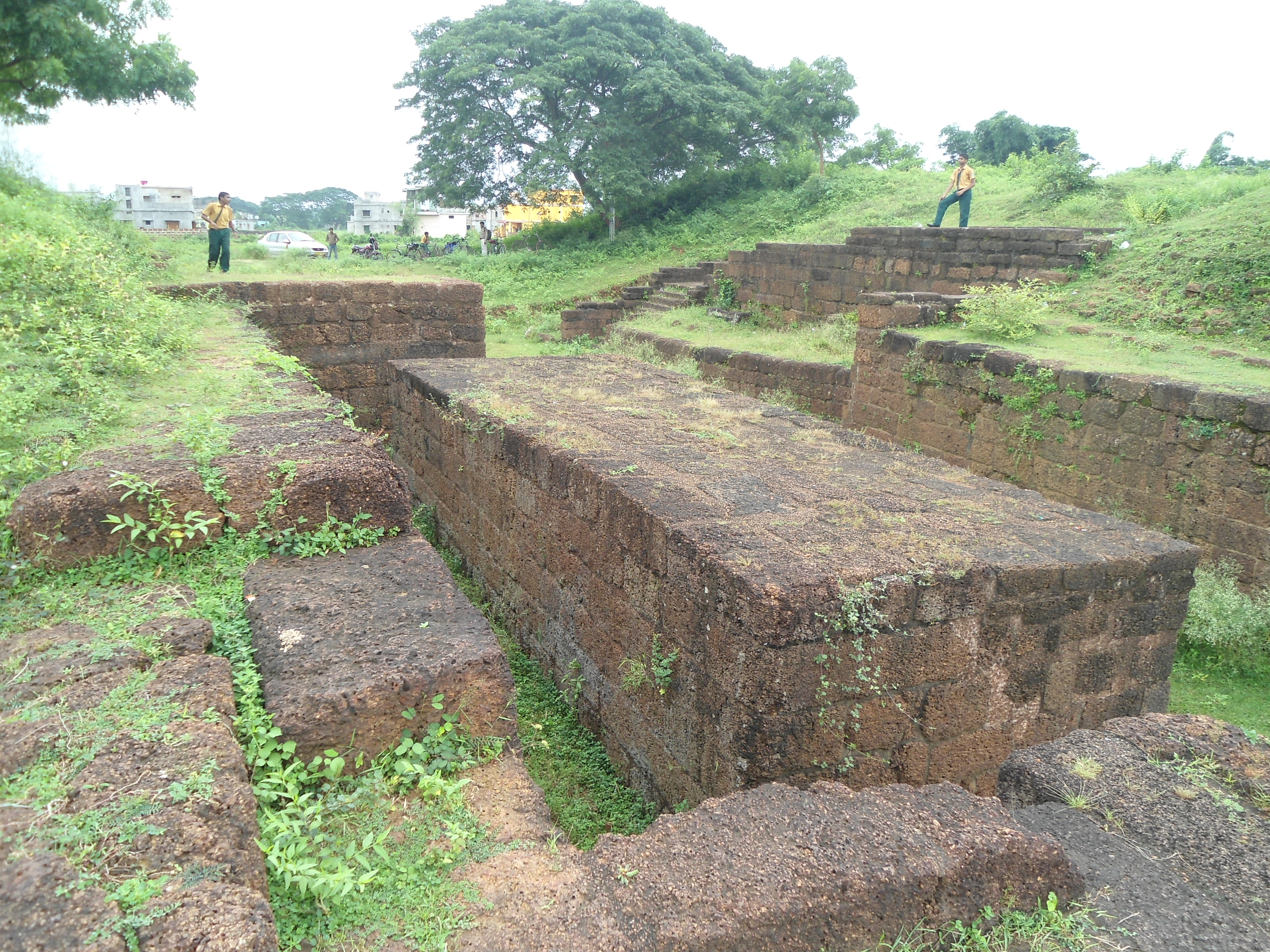
Ruins of the North West gate of Sisupalgarh

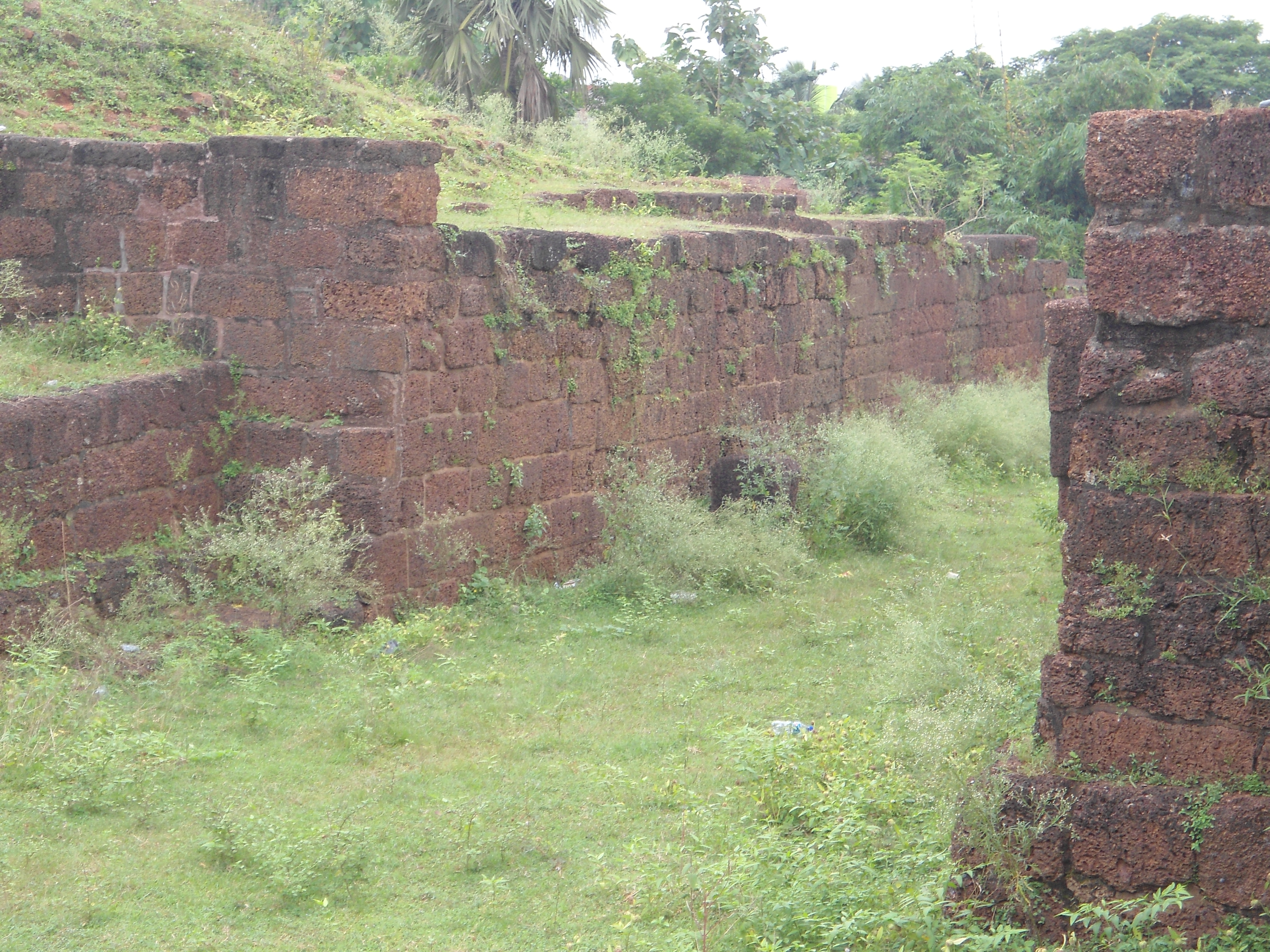
Ruins of the North West gate of Sisupalgarh

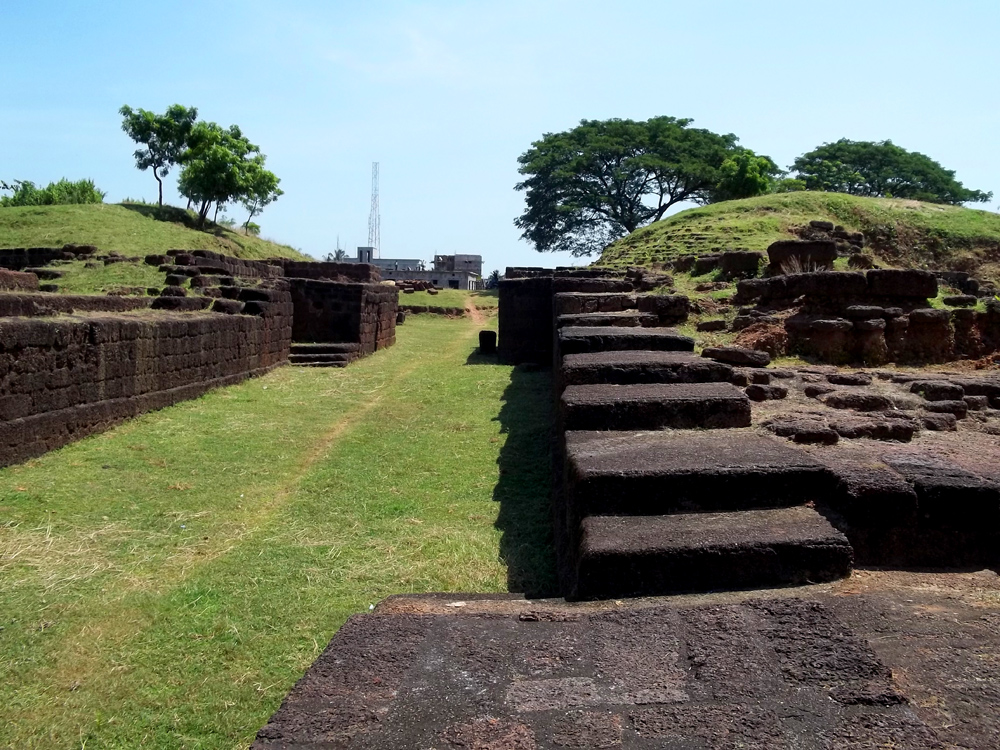
Ruins of the North West gate of Sisupalgarh

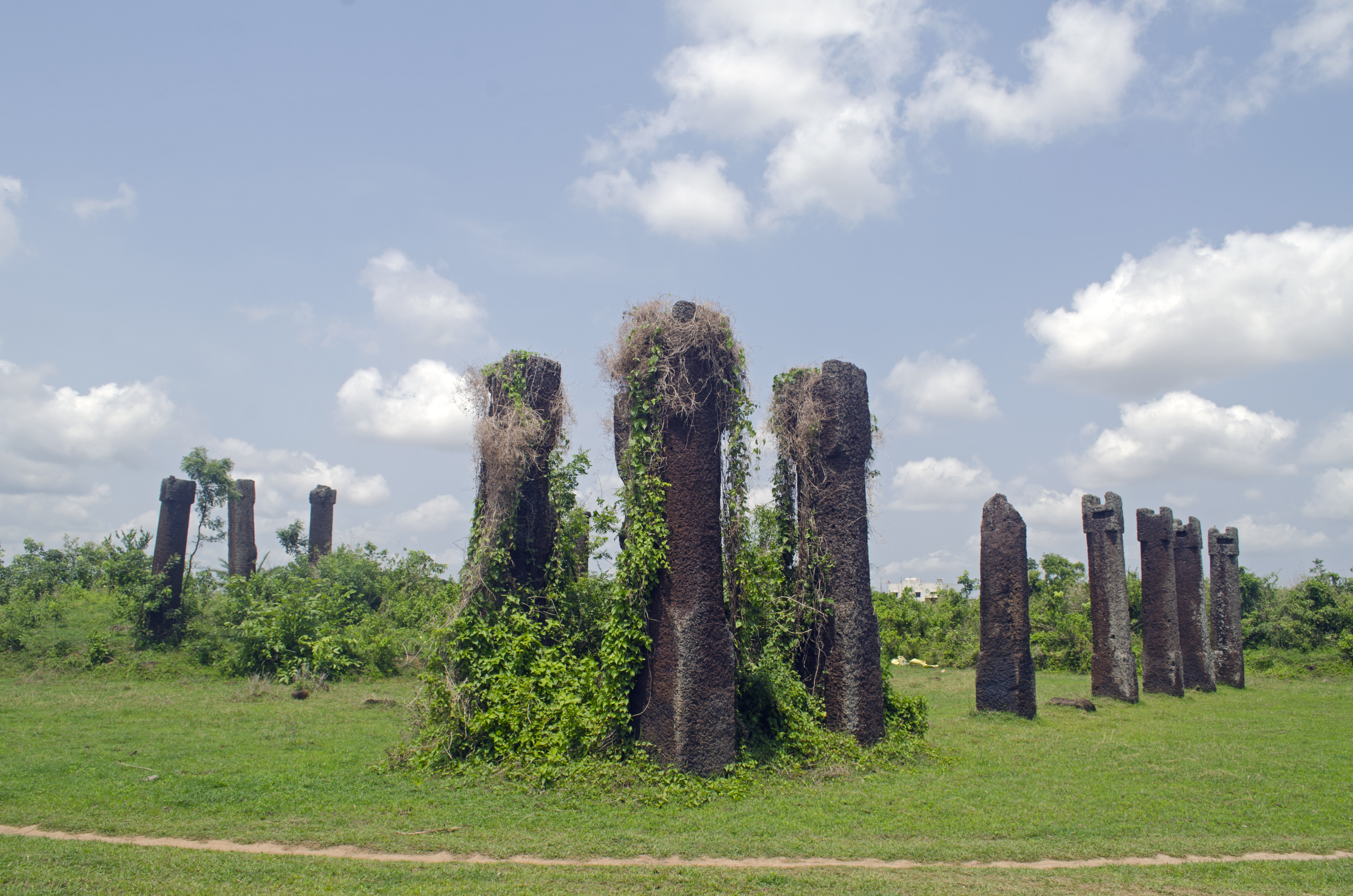
Pillars of Sisupalgarh
