= Annakoteshvara Temple =

Religion
- Affiliation: Hinduism
- District: Dhenkanal district
- Deity: Annakotisvara Siva Temple

Location
- Location: Latadeipur in Gondia tehsil
- State: Odisha
- Country: India
- Interactive map of Annakoteshvara Temple

Annakoteshwara Temple, Annakoteswar Temple, or Annakotisvara Siva Temple is located in Latadeipur in Gondia tehsil in Dhenkanal district, Odisha, India. The Temple is dedicated to Lord Shiva with a stone shivalinga.

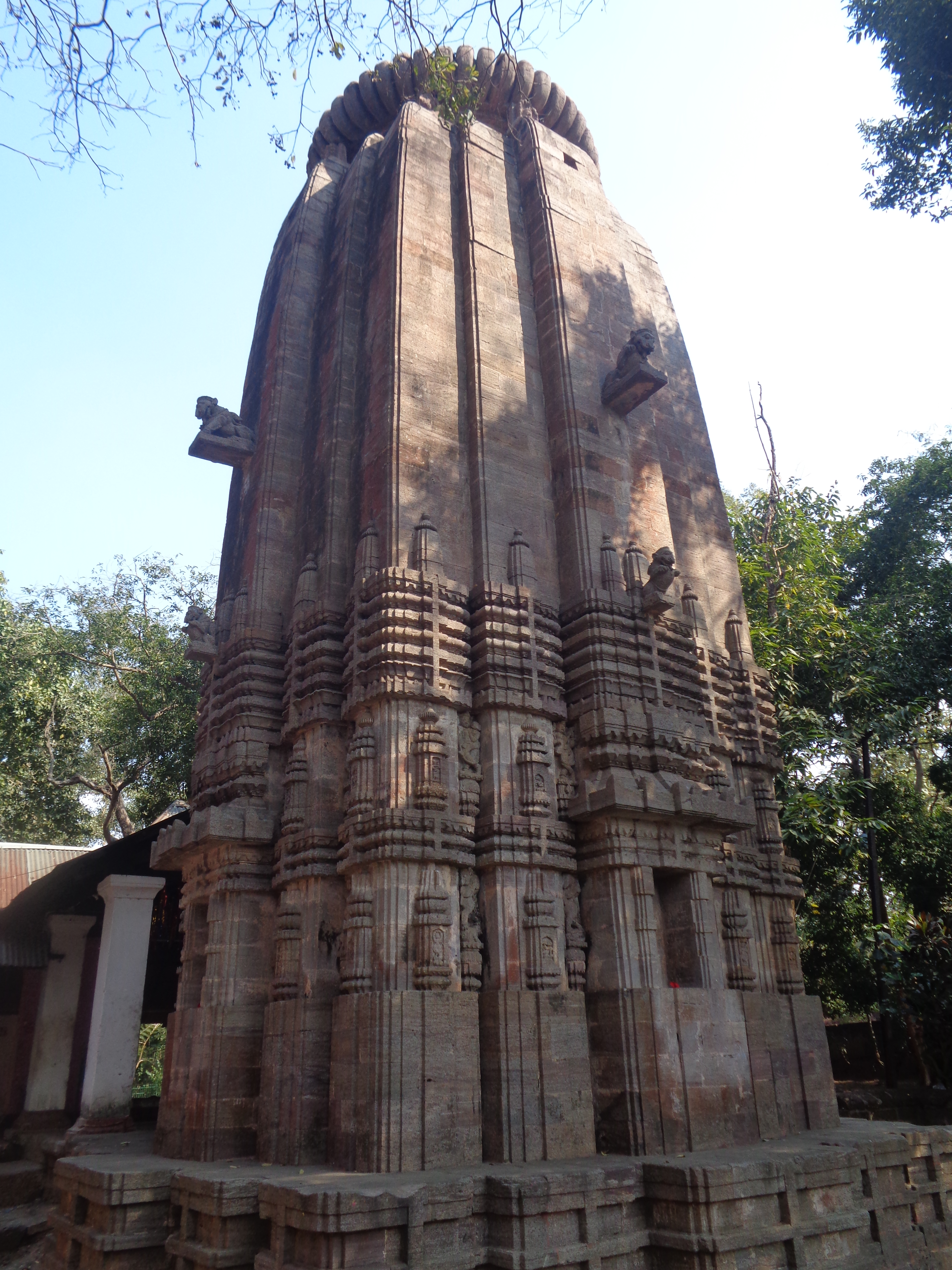
Annakoteshvara Temple, Latadeipur, Dhenkanal

== Architecture ==
The temple is a pancharatha temple having Rekha deula (Vimana) and a Pidha deula. The temple is decorated with Khakharamundi and Pidhamundis along the main Vimana. Several detached sculptures are kept in care. On the basis of construction the temple can be said to be built around 16th century during Suryavamsi Gajapati rule. The Garbhagriha houses a circular Yonipeetha only. The Lingamurthy is displaced by attacks of Kalapahad who was a Muslim invader from the nawabs of Bengal near Murshidabad.

The temple is listed as a monument by the Archaeological Survey of India.
