= Ratnagiri, Odisha =

Buddhist monastery in Odisha, India

Ratnagiri
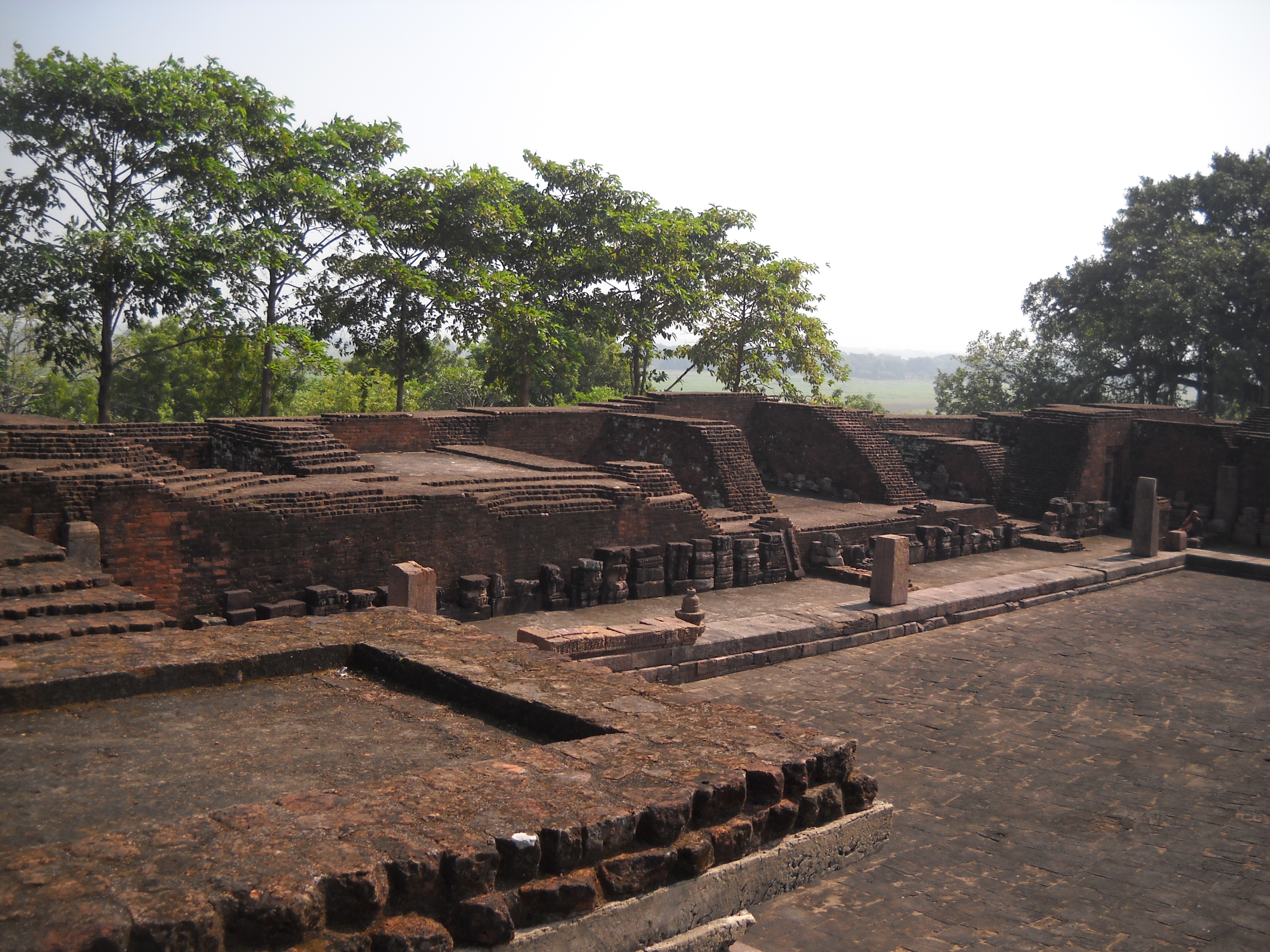
- Ratnagiri Vihara

- Location within India Location within Odisha

Religion
- Affiliation: Buddhism
- Status: Preserved

Location
- Location: India
- State: Odisha
- Interactive map of Ratnagiri
- Coordinates: 20.6412°N 86.3353°E

Architecture
- Type: Stupa
- Style: Buddhist
- Completed: 6th century AD

Ratnagiri (Odia: ରତ୍ନଗିରି, meaning "hill of jewels") is the site of a ruined mahavihara, once the major Buddhist monastery in modern Odisha, India. It is located on a hill between the Brahmani and Birupa rivers in Jajpur district. Together with the nearby Buddhist sites of Lalitgiri and Udayagiri it is known as the Diamond Triangle. Ratnagiri is located 100 km (62 mi) from the state capital Bhubaneswar and 70 km (43 mi) from the former state capital Cuttack.

The Buddhist monuments were constructed from the 5th century CE onwards, with the last work in the 13th century, and the peak period of work done between the 7th to 10th centuries. After perhaps the 16th century the site ceased to be used and fell into ruins. These were little known until the 1960s when major excavations by the Archaeological Survey of India ("ASI") revealed the site, producing large quantities of very fine sculpture. Monastery 1 has been described as "the finest in terms of carved stone decoration to have survived in India". Some of this was removed to museums elsewhere, with much left on site. A museum at the site houses many pieces.

The main elements were an impressive stupa (Stupa 1) surrounded by several hundred smaller stupas of varying dimensions, three quadrangular monasteries (Monasteries 1 to 3). Monastery 1 is by far the largest, with a beautiful carved doorway, spacious open courtyard, cells and verandah facing the courtyard, with a spacious shrine centred on a colossal Buddha.

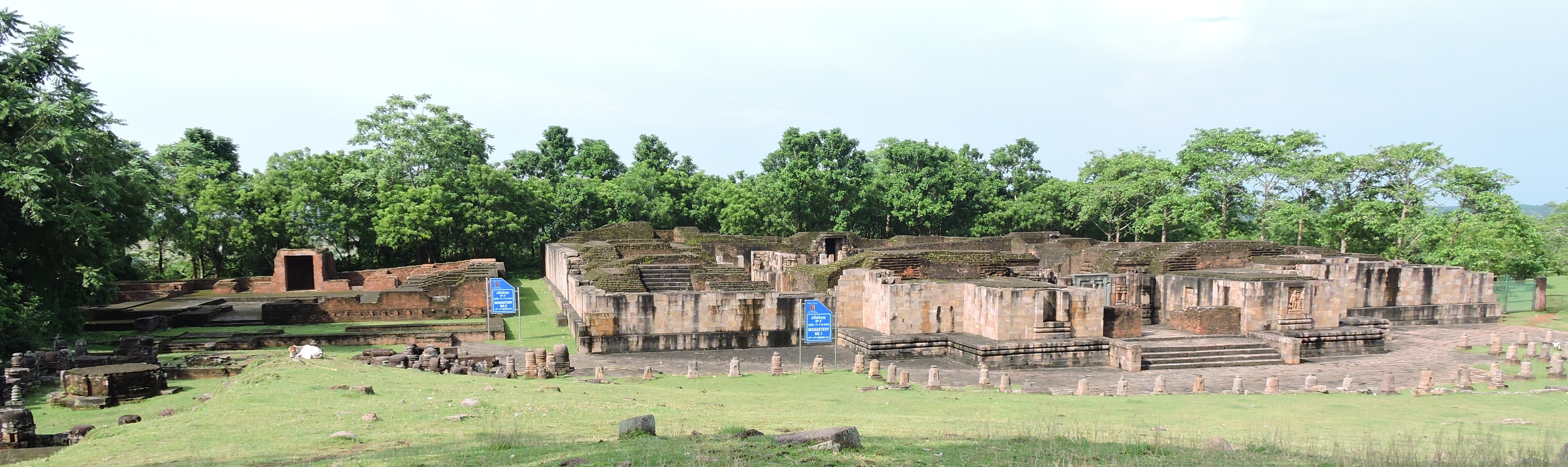
Monastery 2 at left, Monastery 1 at right

The buildings are mainly made up of brick (much of which has now been removed), but the doorways, pillars and sculpture are mostly in two types of stone, which contrast attractively. These are a "blue-green chlorite and the local khondalite, a garniferous gneiss with plum-coloured overtones". The large numbers of sculptures in stone, with a few (27) bronze and brass figures, excavated at the site are mostly in the "Post-Gupta" style, the earlier ones continuing the classic style of Gupta art. They are mostly images of Buddha and the Buddhist pantheon, and analysis of the trends in subjects over time suggests that Ratnagiri turned to become a centre of Tantric Buddhism, as did Nalanda in Bihar. In particular, over two dozen colossal Buddha heads have been found.

== Remains ==
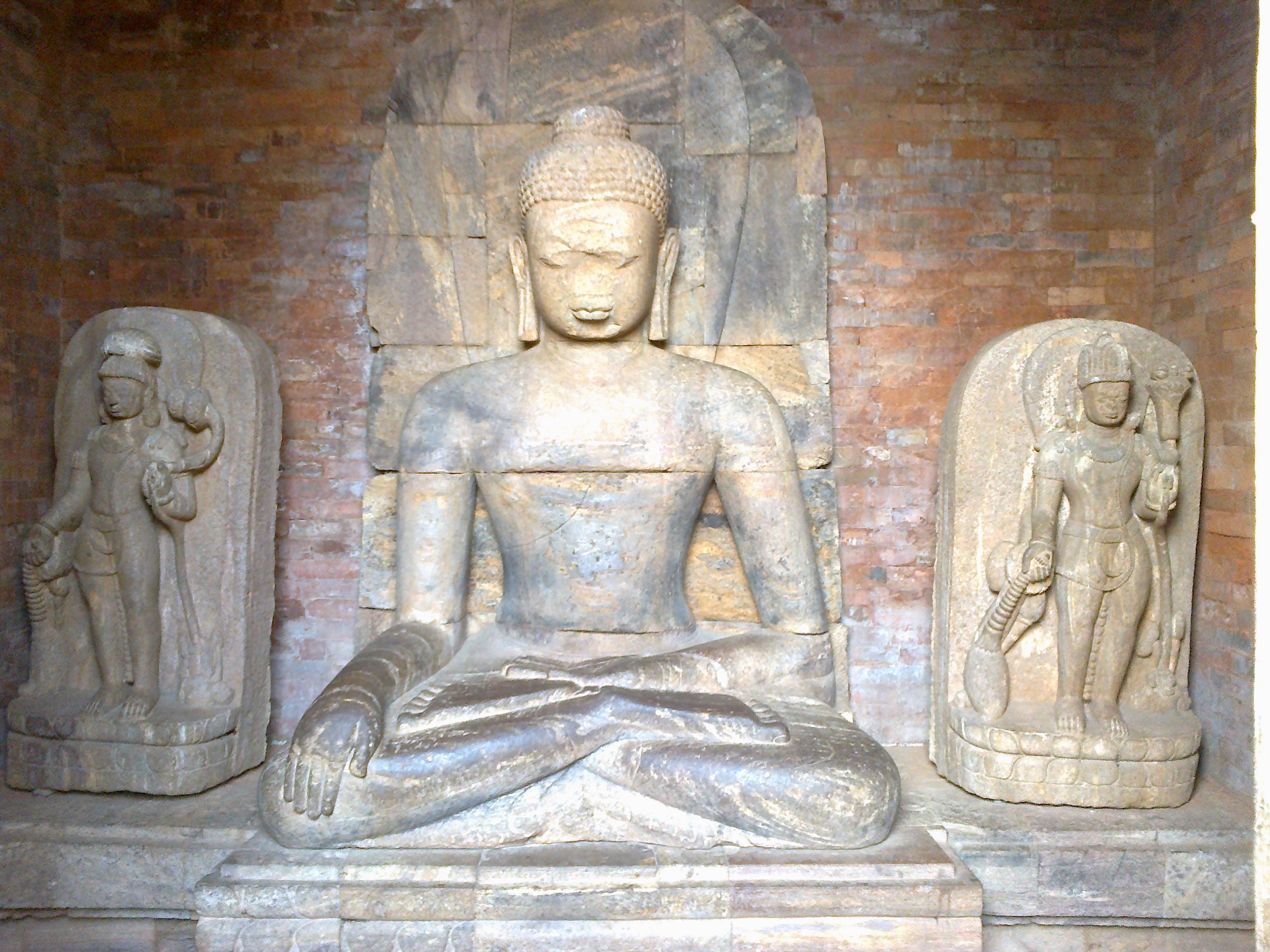
Main shrine Buddha in Monastery 1

=== Monasteries ===
==== Monastery 1 ====
Monastery 1 is among the largest of the three monasteries, with an overall size of 55 square metres, including 21 square metres for the paved central courtyard. It had at least two storeys, but everything above the ground floor has now collapsed. There are 24 surviving cells on the ground floor, relatively large and probably occupied by more than one monk. One was used as the monastery treasury. They are windowless, and were fitted with wooden doors, and probably locks. Across the courtyard from the entrance, which has two layers of porch, is the main shrine, whose elaborately sculpted facade is now isolated in the courtyard. The main shrine image is a colossal seated Buddha, 12 feet (3.7 m) high including the base, flanked by smaller standing figures of Padmapani and Vajrapani holding chamaras. These are in chlorite, with the Buddha carved in a number of horizontal sections.

Monastery 1 was built in at least two major phases, the first dating to the late 8th century, and the second to the 11th or early 12th century; Donaldson prefers the early 10th century for the second phase. The style of sculpture differs considerably between these, and scholars have generally seen the later work as representing a decline in "both moral and artistic standards", as the later work includes some erotic scenes.

The main entrance to the monastery is through an elaborately carved chlorite doorway set back from the main outside wall, which was faced with stone at a later stage than the original construction. The frame was called by Mitra "the loveliest entrance to a structural monastery in the whole of India". It has three main zones, the innermost "an intricate foliated arabesque pattern" with a thin vine stem undulating up it. Next comes a zone with stylized lotus petals, usually seen on curved surfaces, and "quite unique" as a flattened pattern. The outer side elements switch from green chlorite to red stone in mid-composition in the large plant scroll inhabited by playing putti (gelabai), with some bodies half in one stone and half in the other. Across the top lintel there was a relief of vidyadhara figures, of which only the feet remain. In the centre an inset guardian figure of Gaja-Laksmi, borrowed from the Hindu pantheon, runs through two zones. At the bottom of the sides there are two panels each with four richly but lightly dressed lay figures, one holding an umbrella. These are "door guardians" and the innermost figures are large males leaning on clubs; however, the overall impression of the groups is hardly intimidating.

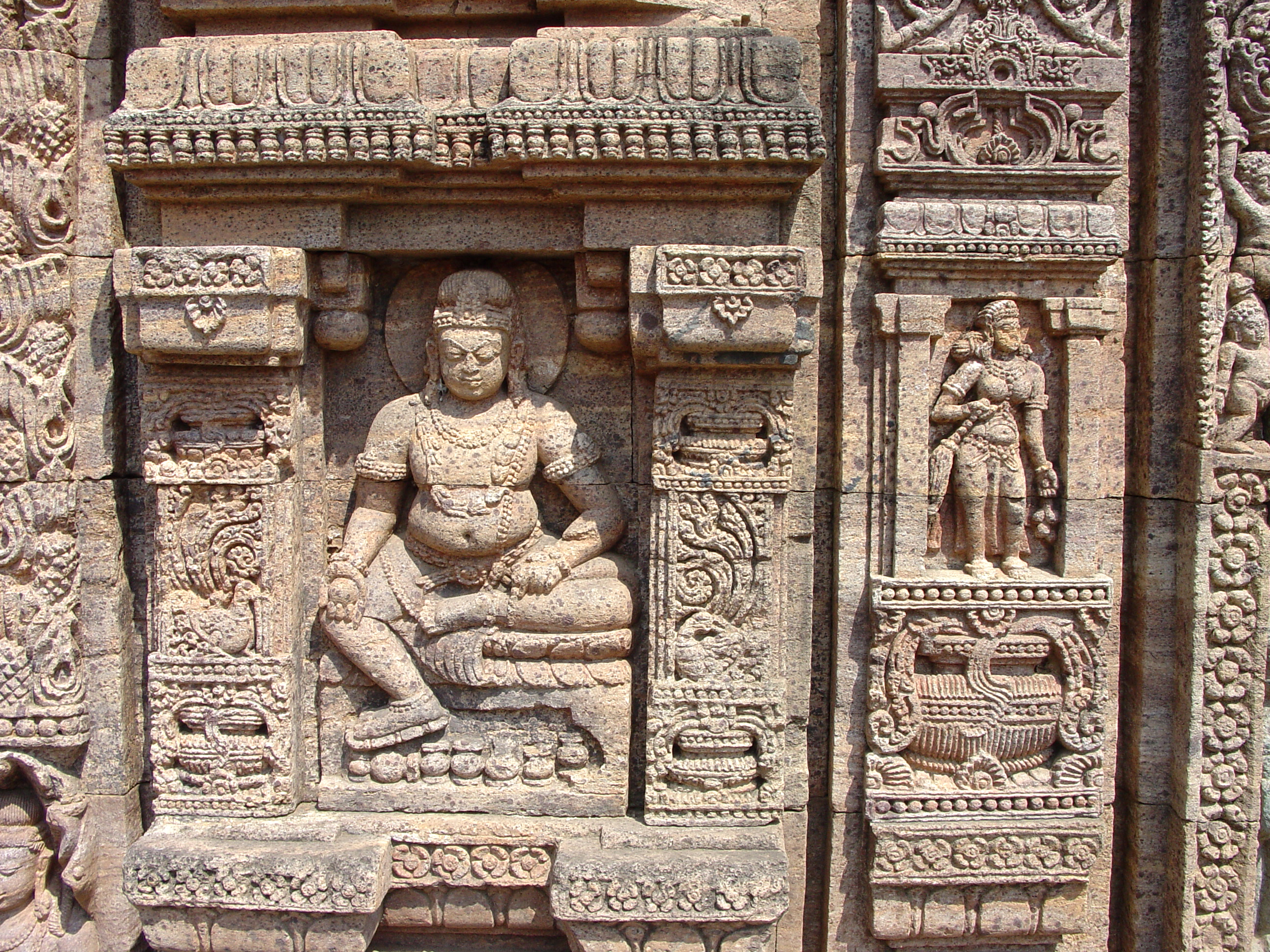
Pancika (the Hindu Kubera), to the side of the main entrance

Around the entrance were a number of large relief panels of standing figures, several now removed elsewhere. On the outside wall the only one left in place is the female figure (illustrated) holding a flowering branch and making the varadamudra with her proper right hand. She is perhaps a river goddess, or Marici. In a niche inside the porch is an image of the river goddess Yamuna in "sisterly camaraderie" with two smaller companions (illustrated below). There was probably a matching Ganga panel on the other side, but this is now missing; the pair are very common figures at the threshold of Buddhist and Hindu establishments. Other common figures in monasteries are pairs of Pancika (the Hindu Kubera) and his consort Hariti, representing material and spiritual wealth at more than one level. The style of these figures demonstrates that they were made at the same period as the sculpture on the Baitala Deula Hindu temple in Bhubaneswar, and it has been suggested that some individual sculptors worked at both sites, "a lack of sectarian specialization" in builders and carvers in India being very common.

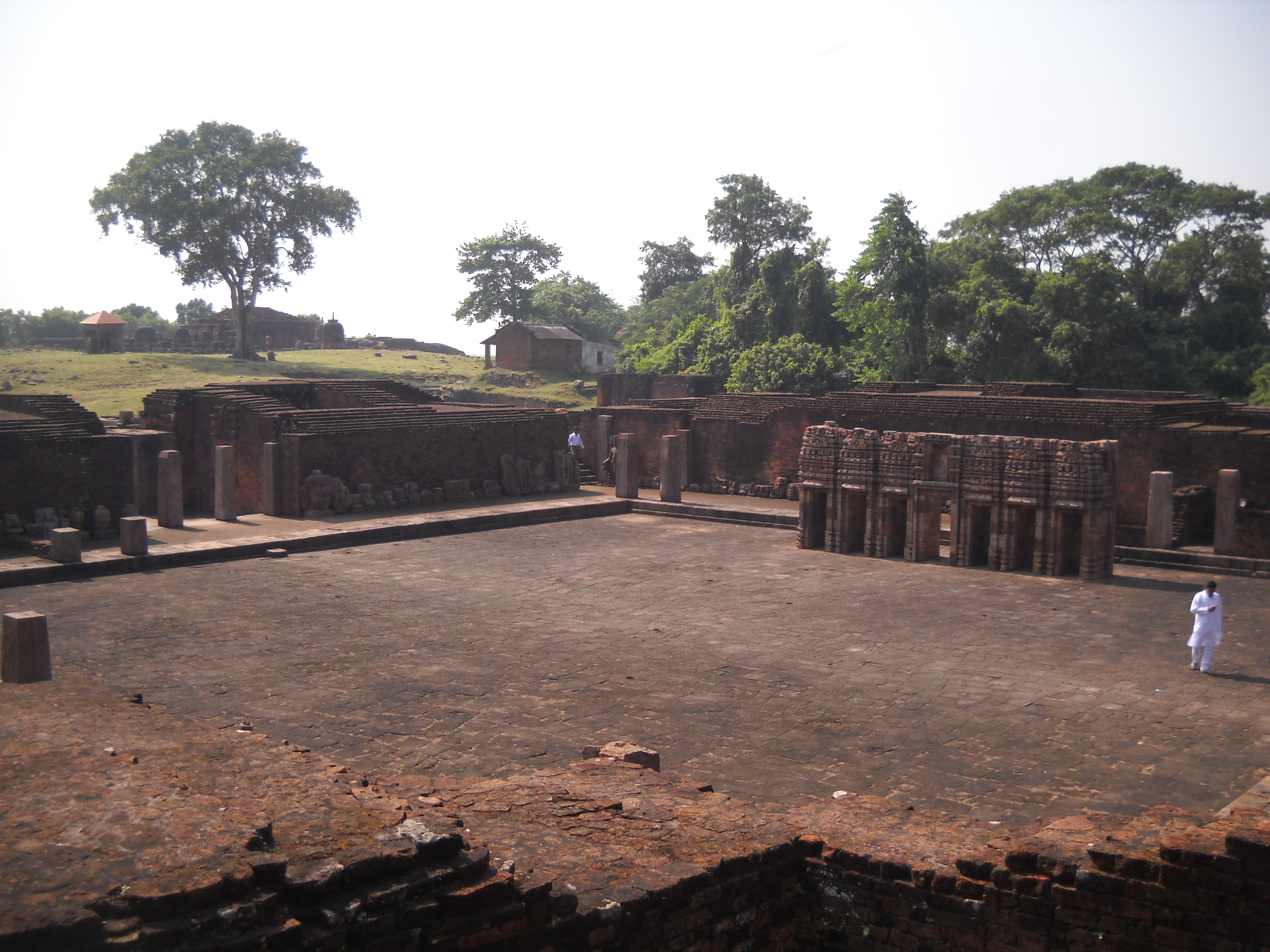
Monastery 1 courtyard; the main stupa in the distance at left

The monastery courtyard had a large verandah, now mostly vanished, probably giving an effect and utility similar to the cloisters of European Christian monasteries. One part, with a central doorway flanked on both sides by three niches, was exceptionally elaborate, and has been reconstructed by the ASI, replacing missing elements with matching shaped but undecorated stone blocks. This was a later addition, called by Reichle the "third facade to rear shrine". The carving includes numerous small figures, often now hard to identify. This now stands alone in the courtyard, not quite in its original position.

==== Monasteries 2 and 3 ====
Monastery 2, next to Monastery 1 but much smaller, features a central paved courtyard flanked by a pillared veranda around which are eighteen cells, a central shrine featuring an image of Shakyamuni in Varada Mudra flanked by Brahma and Sakra, and elaborately ornamented entrance porticos. It only had a single story.

It may have been the first to be built, as Mitra dates the first construction to about the 5th century (as opposed to the 8th for Monastery 1), with more building in the 7th and 11th centuries.

Monastery 3 is on a small hillock to the north-west, and much smaller again, with only three cells in a row, and a portico.

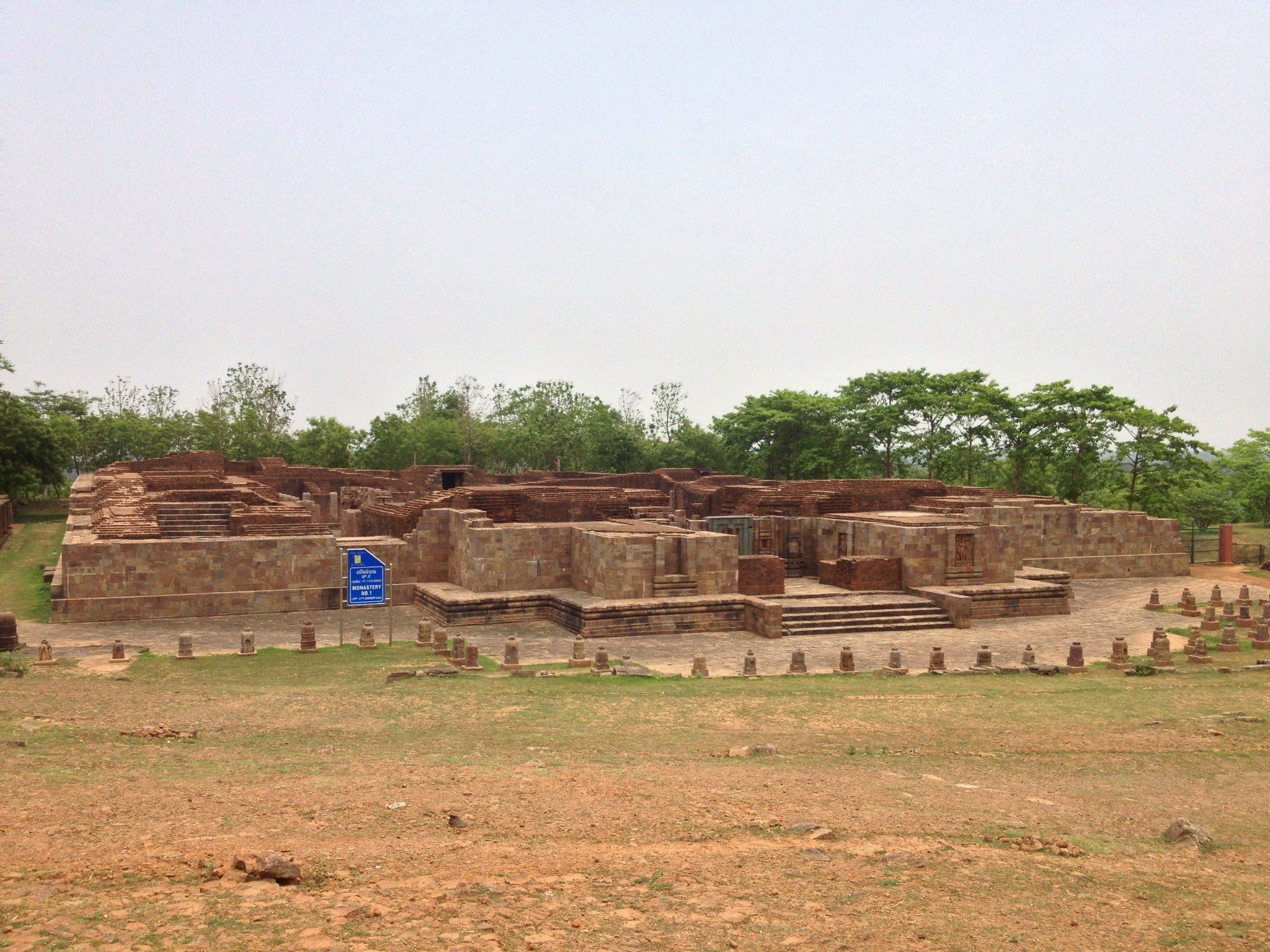
Entrance to Monastery 1

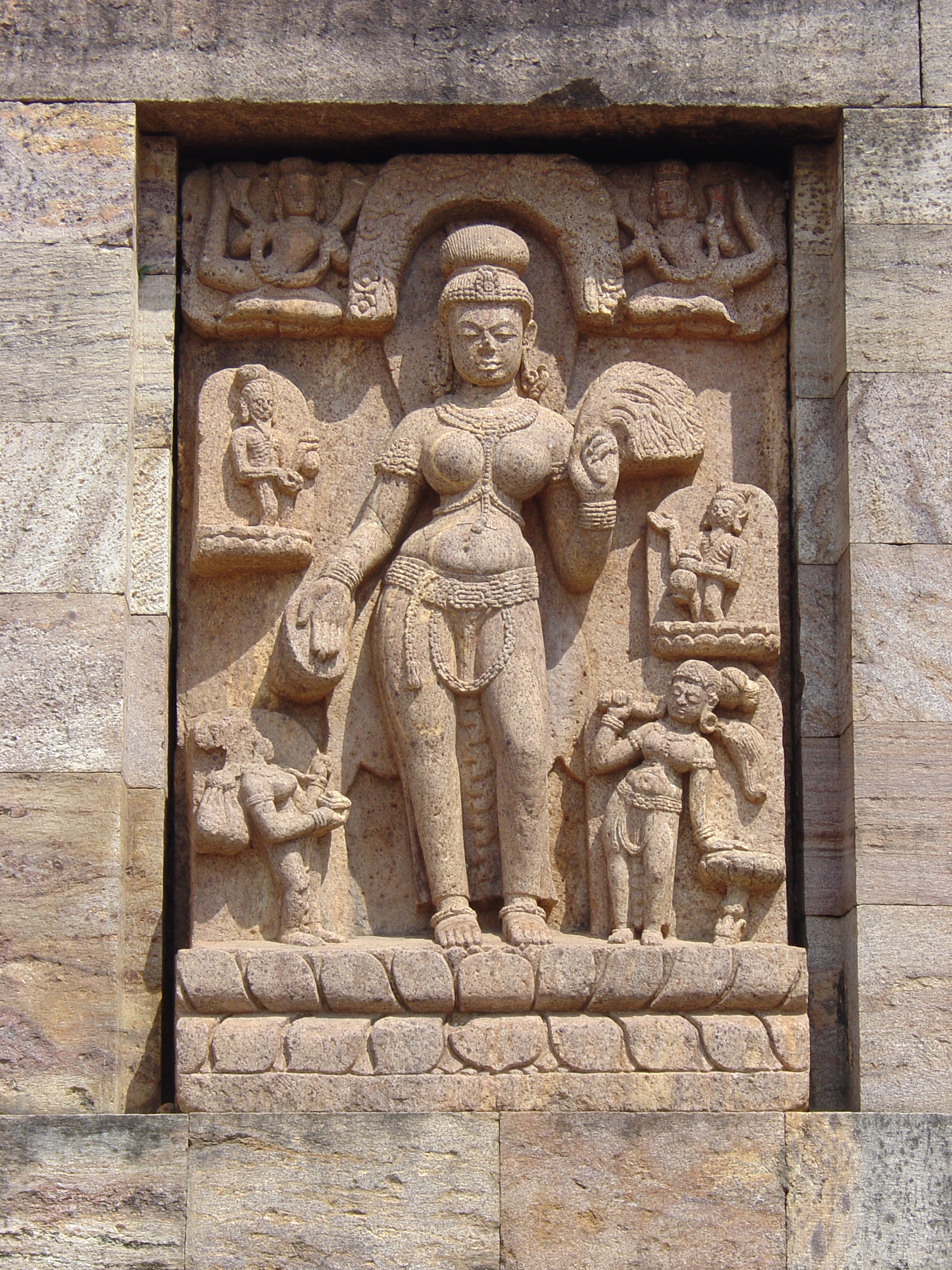
Figure by entrance, Asokakanta-Marici.

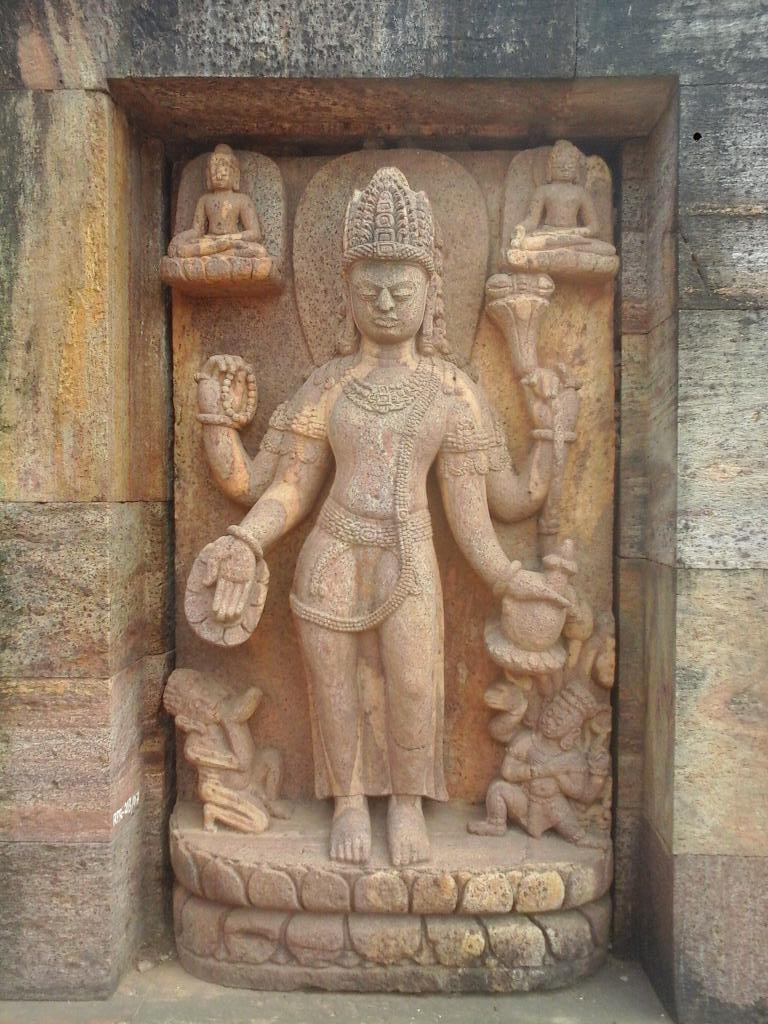
Vajrapani relief panel by entrance.

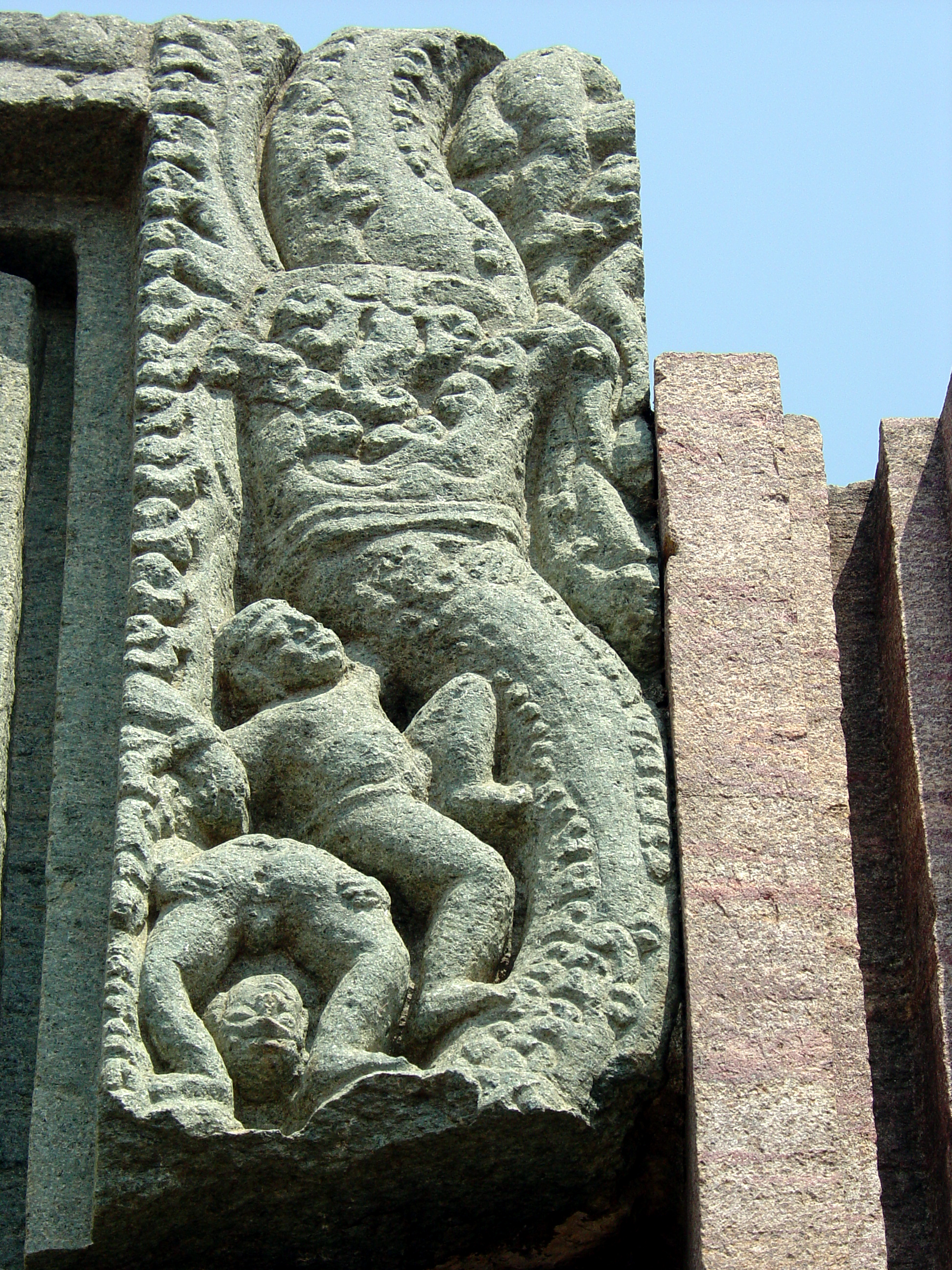
Top-left corner of the scroll round the entrance; the lower boy shows the viewer his bottom

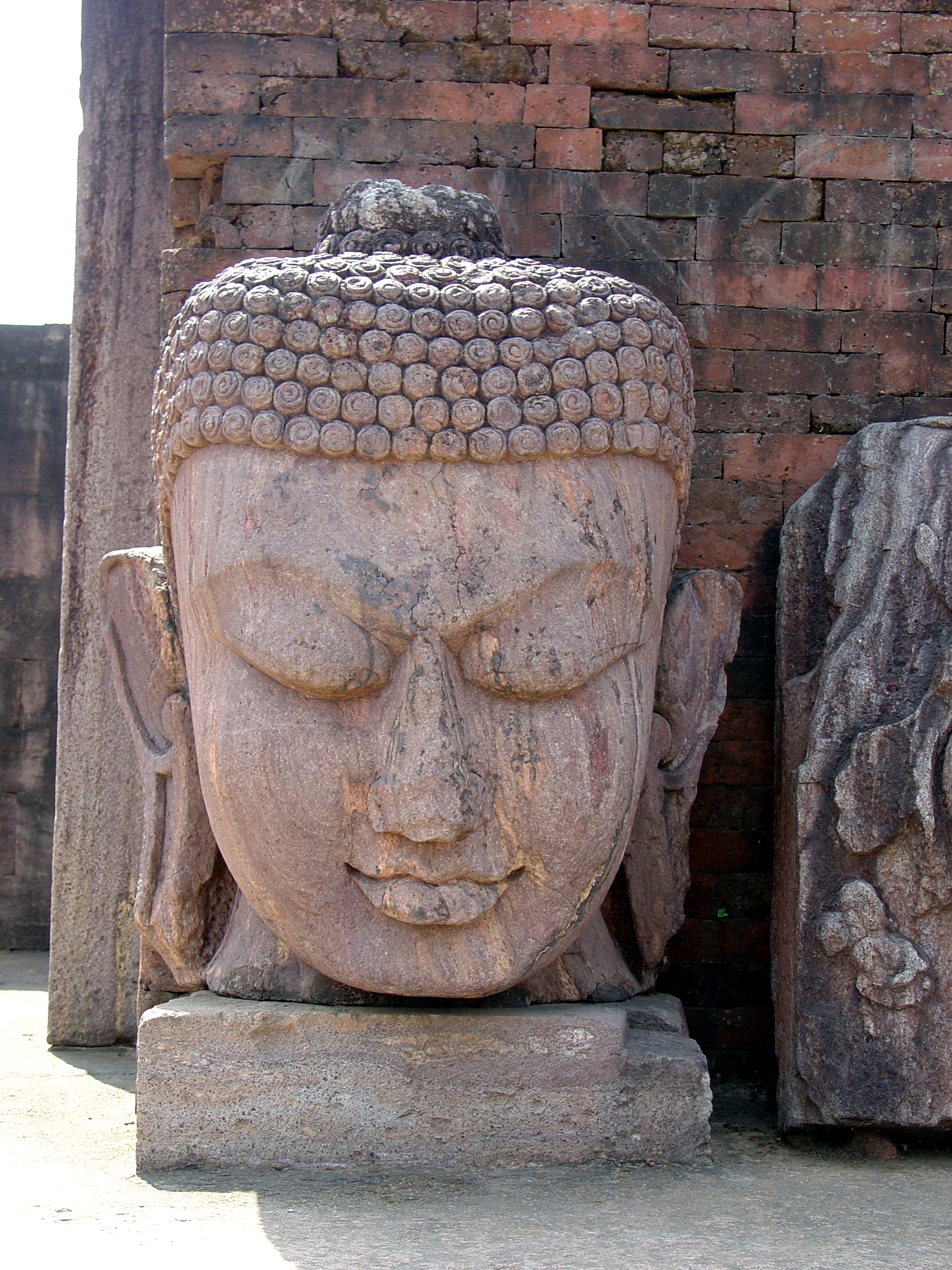
Colossal Buddha head, in Monastery 1

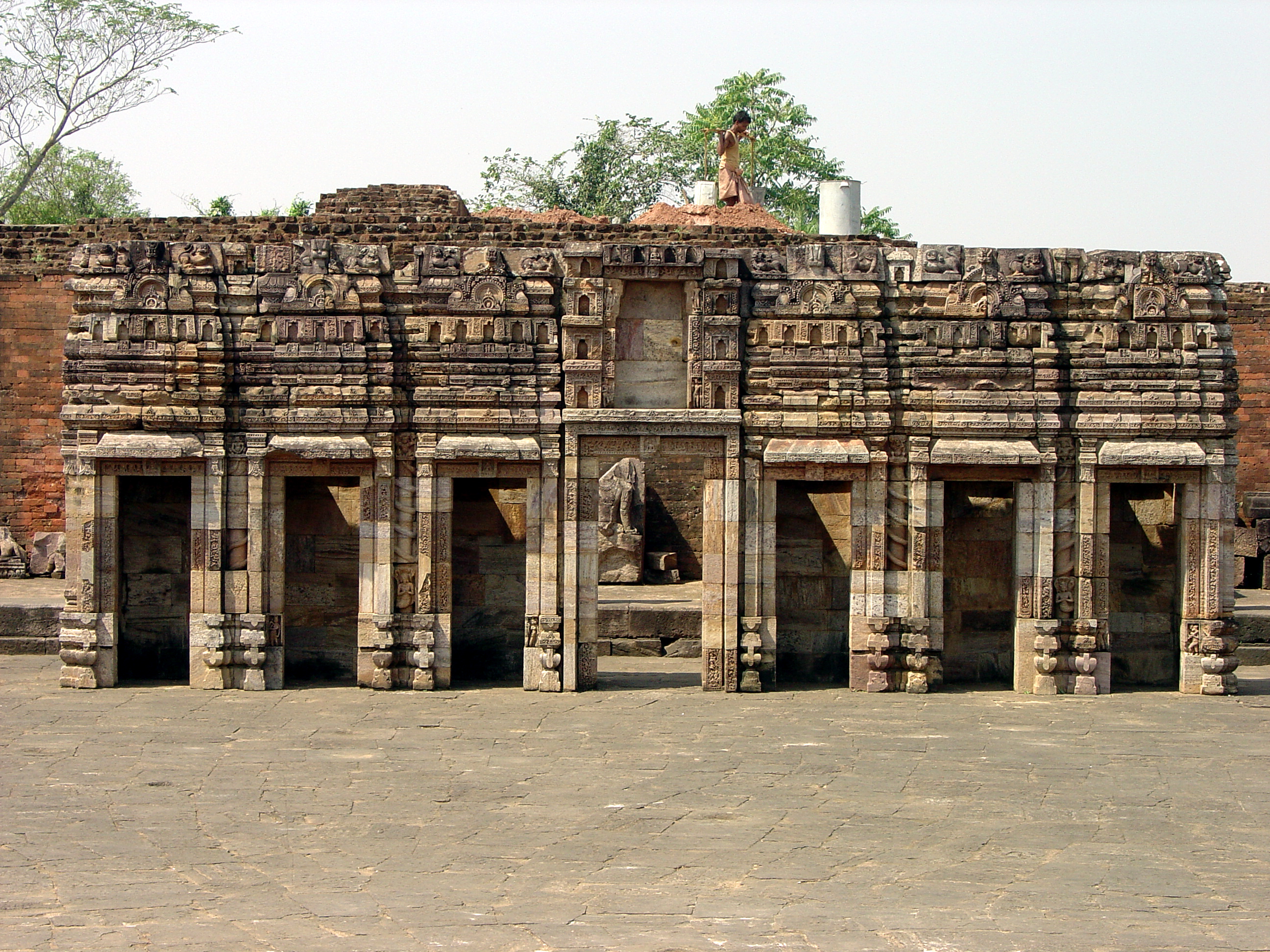
"Third facade to rear shrine", a later addition to Monastery 1.

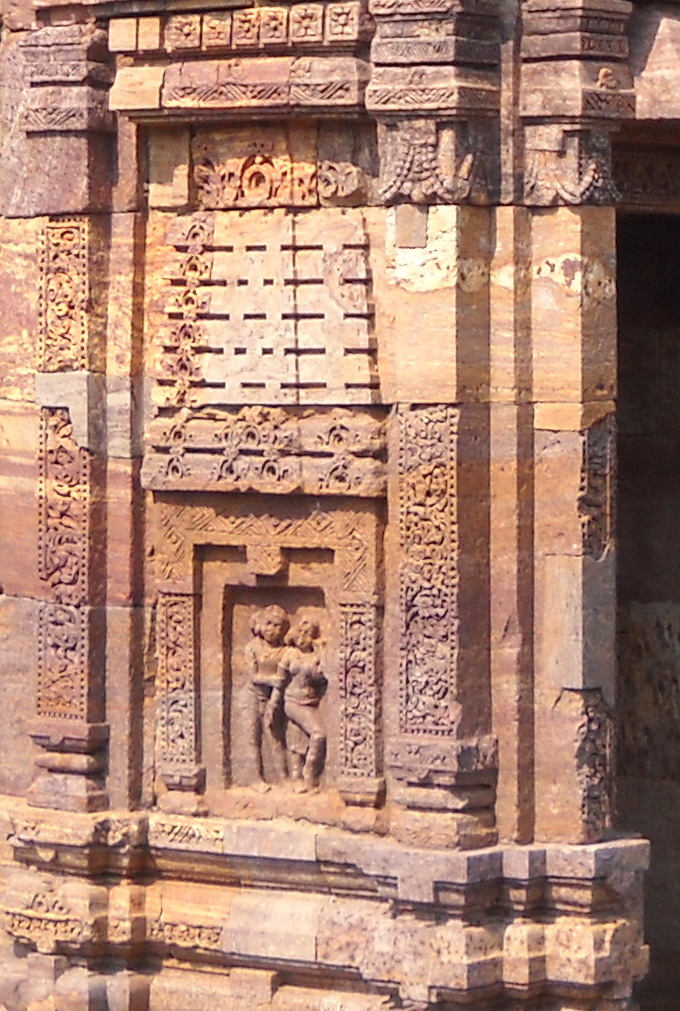
Side of the "third facade", showing an erotic scene (with no haircutting) and the plain shaped restoration pieces.

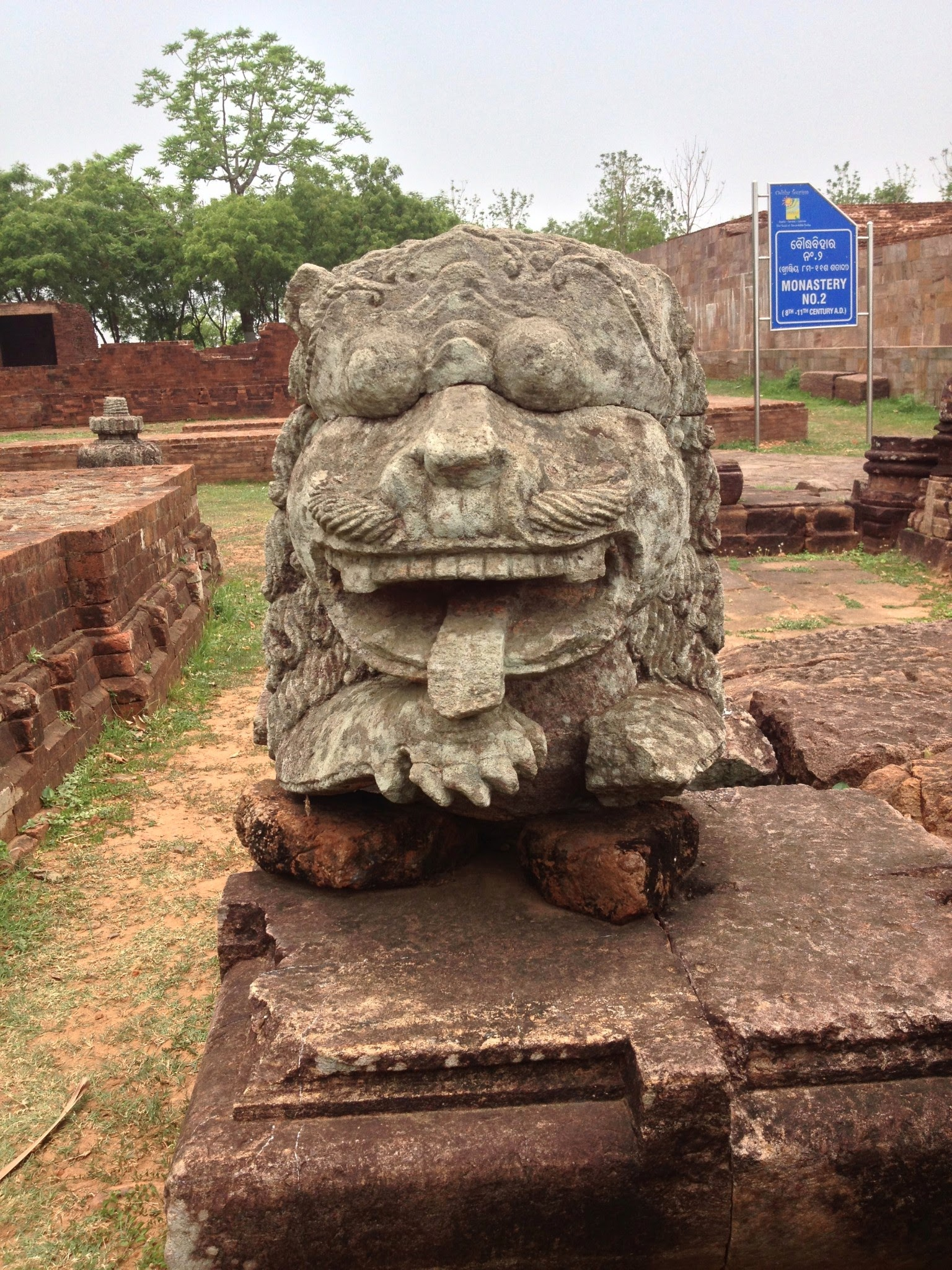
Lion statue in front of Monastery 2.

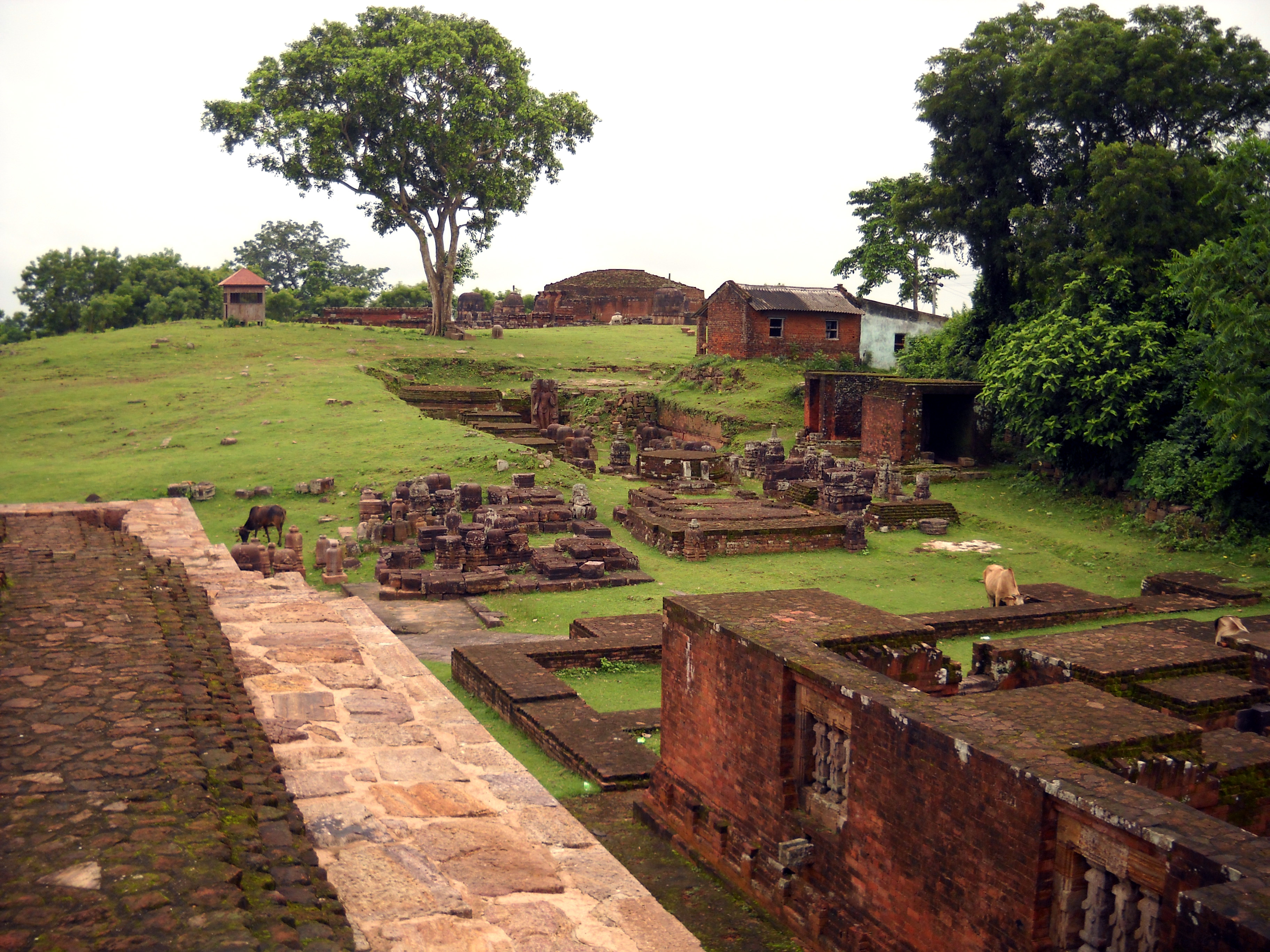
Monastery 2 (right) from Monastery 1, the main stupa in the distance

=== Stupas and temples ===
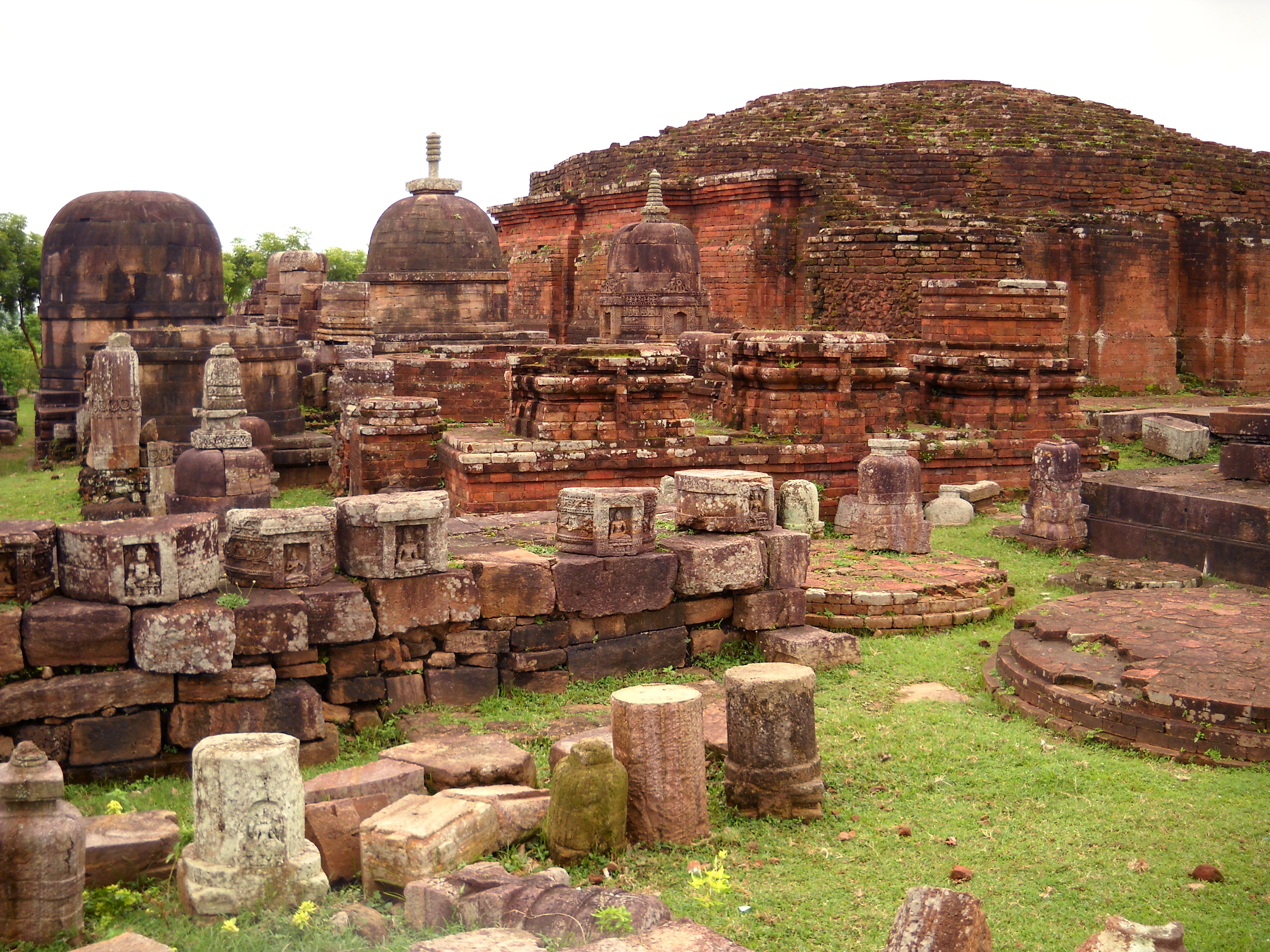
Stump of main stupa, and smaller stupas

The main stupa dates to the 9th century and was likely built on the site of an earlier, Gupta-era stupa. It is on the highest point in the site and has a square base, 47 feet (14 m) metres on each side. The stupa is now 17 feet (5.2 m) high, but was originally a good deal higher, to an unknown extent. There was a pathway between the plinth and outer wall for ritual pradakshina or circumambulation; this was a later addition. Prominent, well-preserved standing statues of the bodhisattvas Vajrapani and Padmapani can be found in niches in a portico.

The stupa is surrounded by large numbers of much smaller stupas, some four or more metres high, but large numbers less than a metre. Most of the smaller ones show a seated deity figure in a niche on one side, and many are decorated with lotus petals and beaded tassels around their shaft. These are mostly carved from a single piece of stone. Many Indian Buddhist sites have some of these, but at Ratnagiri there are more than 700 of them in total, which is an exceptionally large number, and they represent an exceptional range of deities, with 22 identified. Some 535 of the total are found to the south-west to the main stupa.

Most can be dated to between the 9th and 13th centuries, and were evidently made on or very close to the site; some unfinished examples have been found, including those with the space for the figure left blank, to be finished when the customer chose a deity. It is thought they served as memorials and reliquaries for dead monks, and votive offerings by pilgrims.

A total of 1386 clay seals were found, most bearing the legend Sri Ratnagiri Mahavihariya Aryabikshu Sanghasya, which helped to identify the name of Ratnagiri monastery.

One temple has been converted to Hindu use as the Dharma Mahakala temple; this was built over an earlier stupa, and was moved to the side of the site and re-erected by the ASI. It contains a Buddhist standing relief figure of Manjushri. The later parts date to the 11th century.

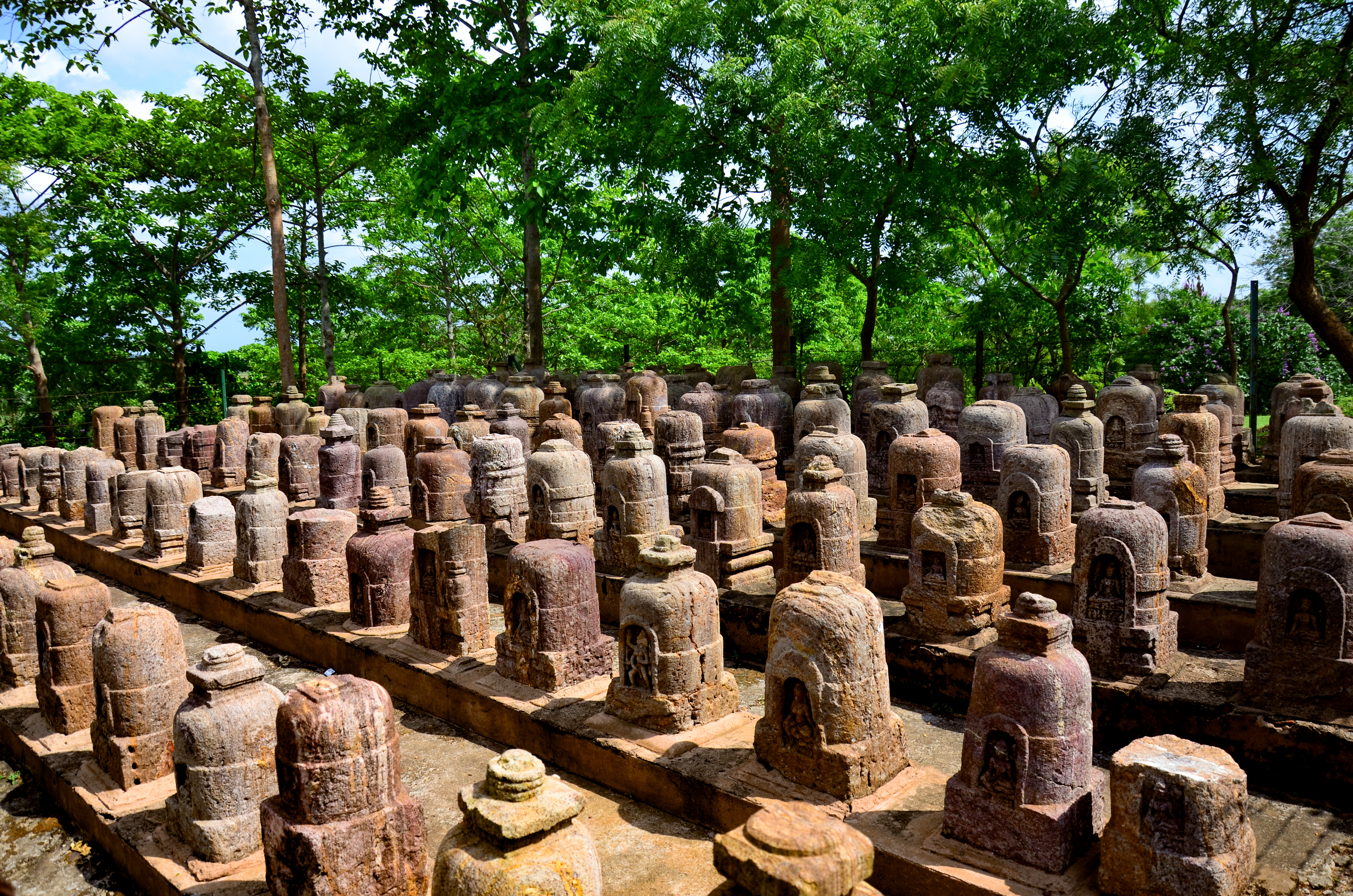
Rows of small stupas

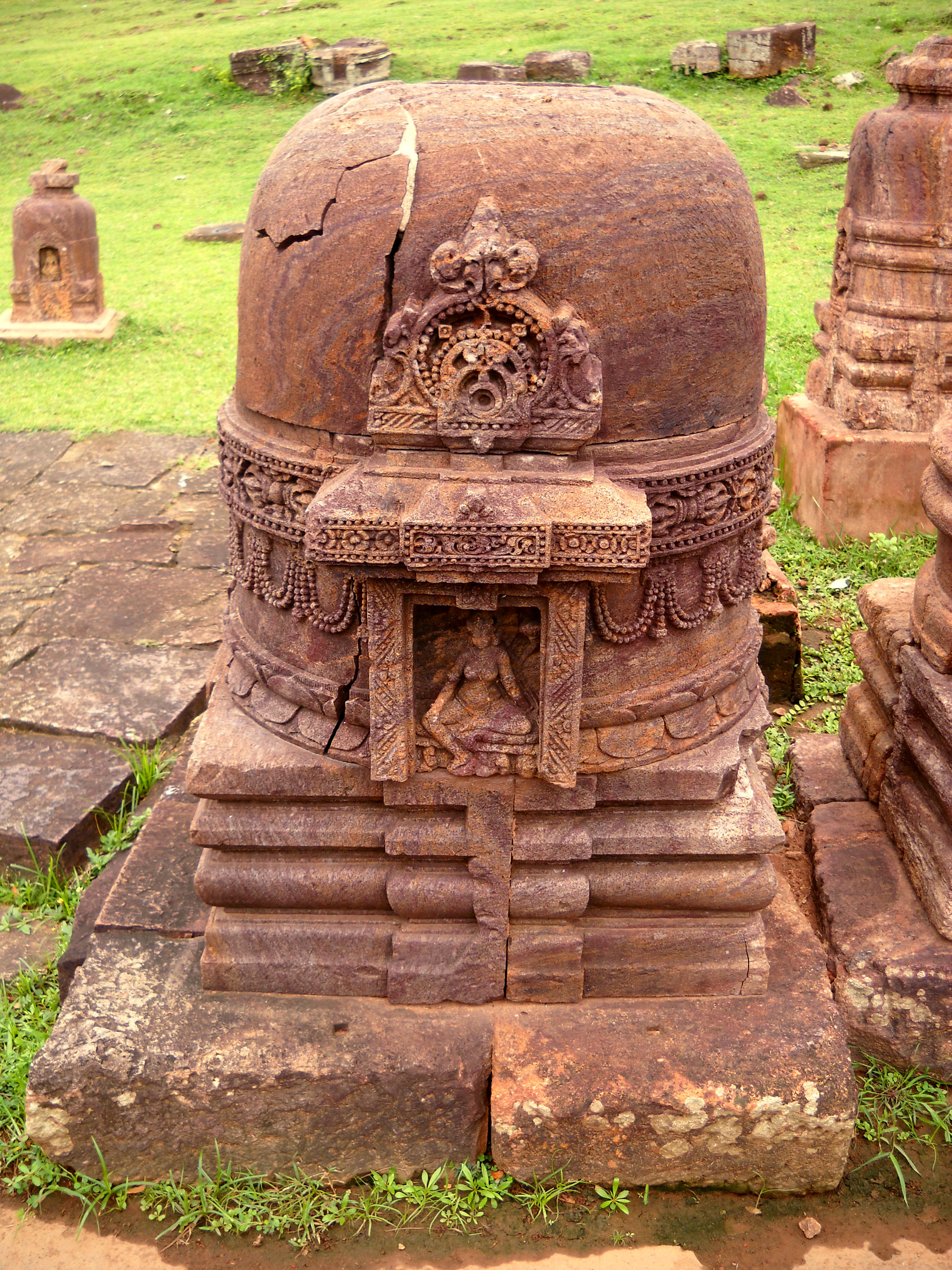
A small votive stupa

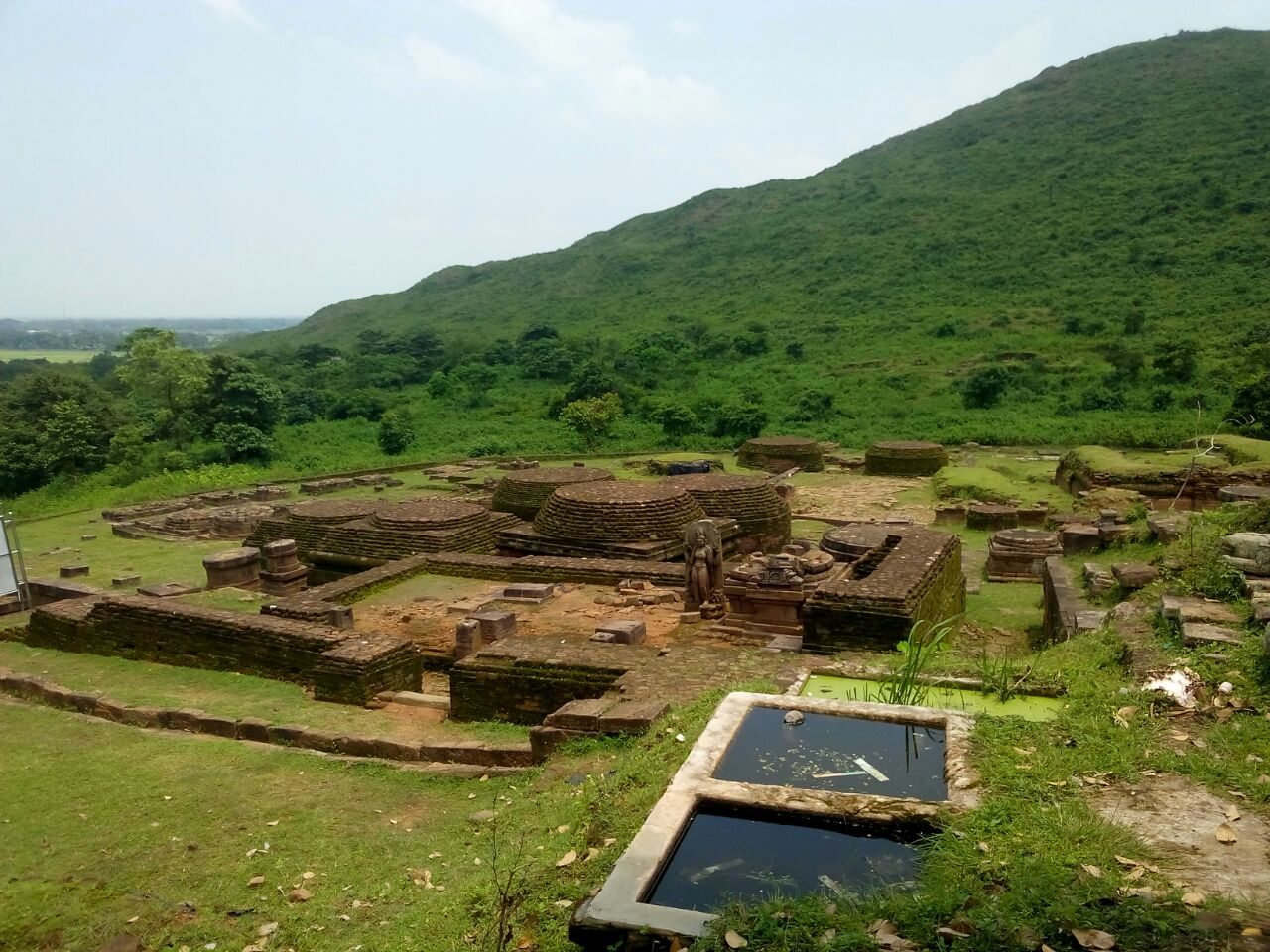
Bases of minor stupas and temples

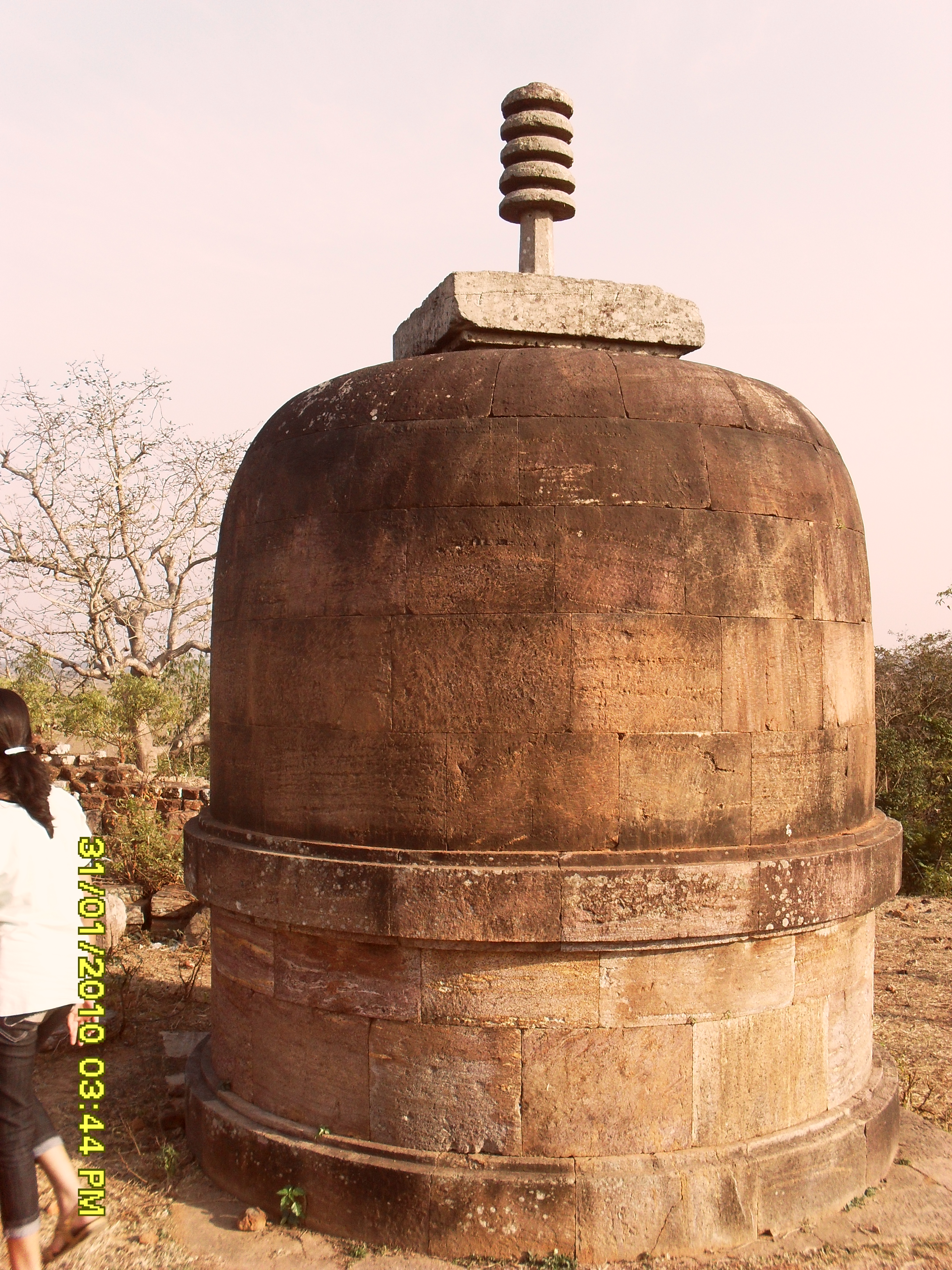
Middle-sized stupa in good condition

== History ==
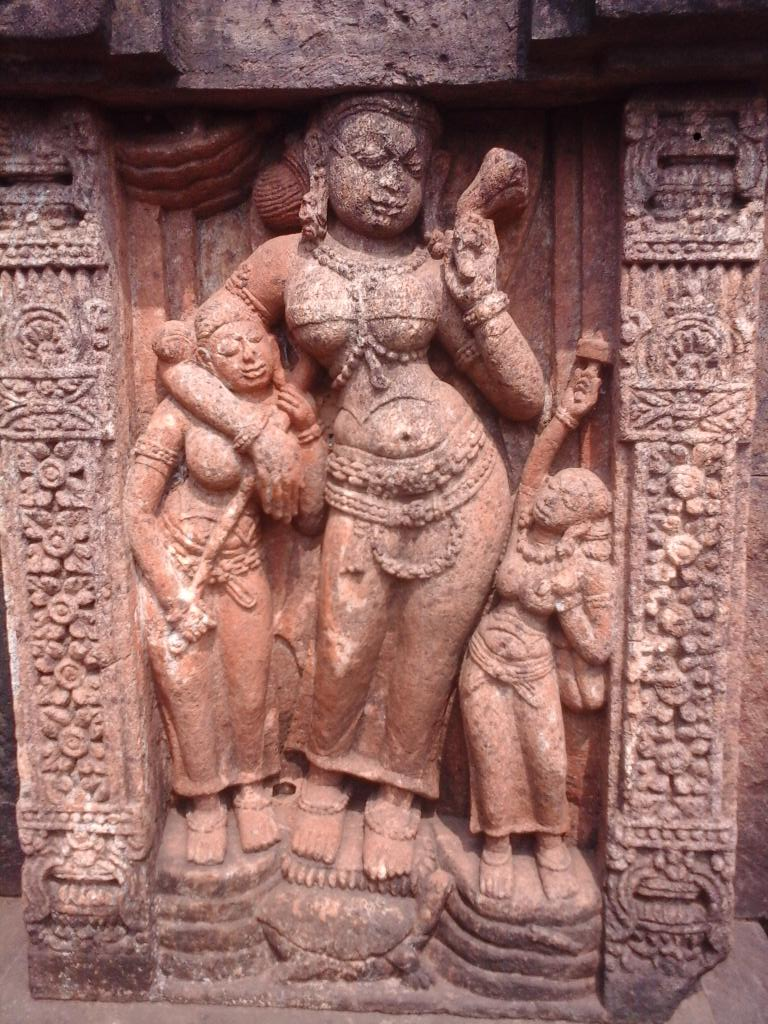
The river goddess Yamuna, rear wall of front porch.

Ratnagiri was likely established no later than the reign of the Gupta king Narasimha Baladitya in the first half of the sixth century, and flourished until the twelfth century. The main construction of the surviving part of Monastery 1 was under the rule of the (mainly) Buddhist Bhauma-Kara dynasty, whose capital was nearby at Jajpur, although no inscription records patronage at Ratnagiri by the dynasty.

A Tibetan history, the Pag Sam Jon Zang, identifies Ratnagiri as an important centre in the development of the Kalachakratantra in the 10th century, an assertion supported by the discovery of a number of votive stupas, plaques, and other artifacts featuring Kalachakra imagery. It was thought, with Lalitgiri and Udaigiri nearby, to be the Pushpagiri Vihara mentioned by the 7th-century Chinese pilgrim Hiuen Tsang, but this has been thrown into doubt by the discovery in the 1990s of a previously unknown site in the area on Langudi Hill, which may be Pushpagiri.

The hundreds of small votive stupas at Ratnagiri suggest it was an important site for pilgrimage, and it was very likely connected to the important trade networks of ancient Kalinga, which stretched to South-East Asia.

North-East India, Bengal and Odisha, was the last stronghold of Buddhism in India, though greatly weakened by the Muslim invasions of the 12th century, which completely destroyed the greatest centre in the region at Nalanda. By the end of the 13th century, Ratnagiri was in decline, and new work ceases. Through no longer in an affluent condition the Buddhist establishment at Ratnagiri is thought to have continued until about the 16th century, during which there was a "modest revival of structural activity", including a restoration of the main stupa.

Unlike, for example, the Ajanta Caves, which were completely forgotten for centuries (except by local villagers), the ruins of Ratnagiri were known about, and are briefly discussed in government reports from the late 19th century onwards, with "brief articles by scholars" from the 1920s onwards. However, Debala Mitra records that when the main ASI excavation began in 1958, the local people had lost all memory of the site as a religious foundation, and believed the mounds had been the palace of a "mythical king", calling them "the queen's mound" ("Ranipukhuri").

A large-scale excavation was conducted at the site by the ASI between 1958 and 1961, uncovering most of what is known today. The report of these excavations was published by the ASI (Mitra, 1981 and 1983). In this twenty year interval a thesis and article were published. There was a further ASI campaign in 1997–2004, which concentrated on moving the temple which had been built over a stupa. The large amount of sculpture surviving has been analysed in a number of publications.

== Religious development ==
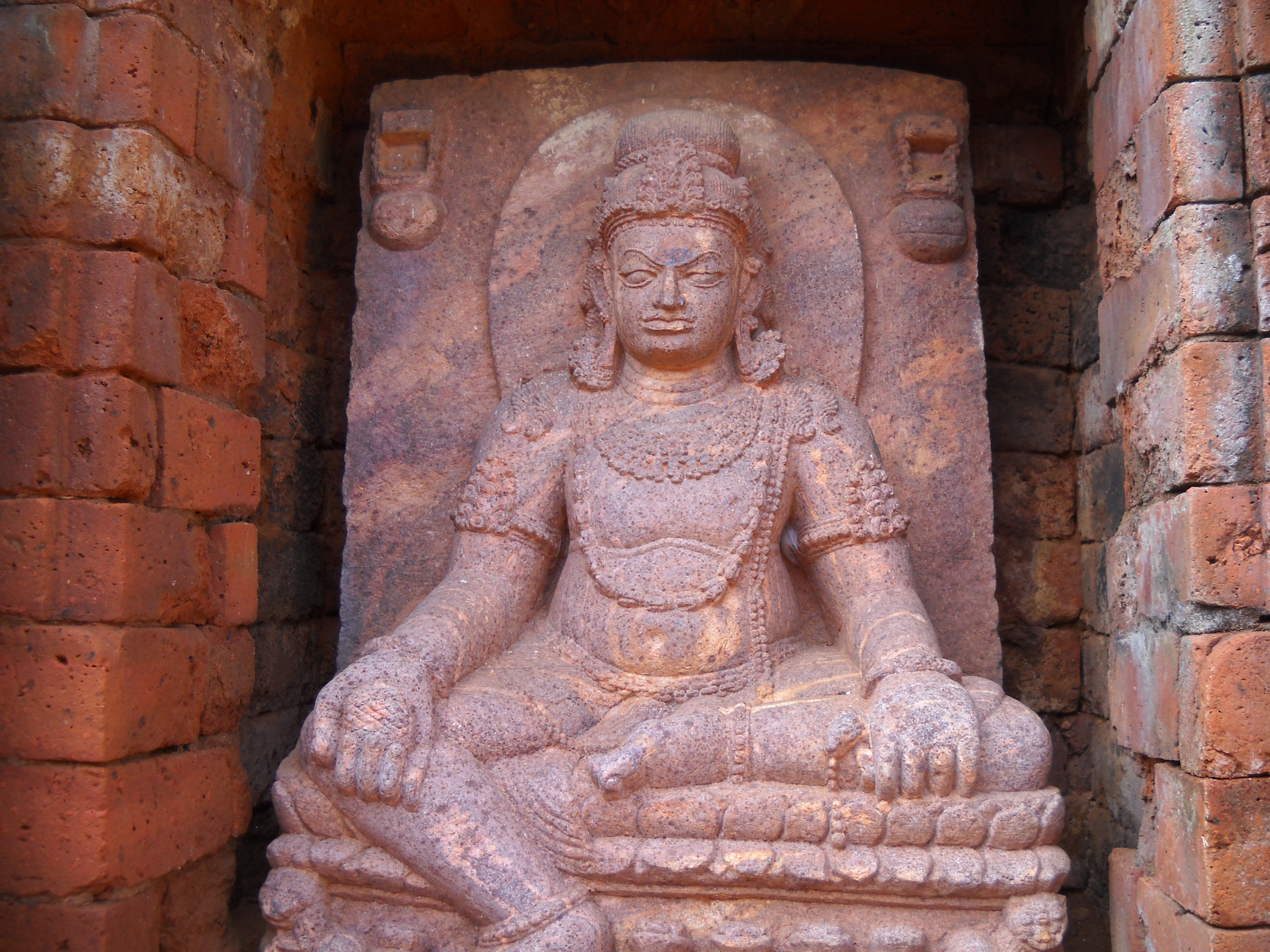
Pancika in second porch.

The identification and iconography of the figures in sculpture at Ratnagiri have been the subject of considerable analysis, although much remains uncertain. The exceptionally large number and range of figures shown, above all on the small stupas, makes Ratnagiri an outstanding Indian site for the study of Buddhist images. An evolution of the prevailing religious thought has been detected, reflected in the choice of images, and relating them to a wider range of Buddhist texts, despite very little evidence as to what texts or practices were used or even known at Ratnagiri itself. The religious affiliations of the monastery probably changed over its long history, and it seems it was often the case that different Buddhist traditions co-existed within a single monastery.

The "overwhelming majority" of the sculpture can be grouped into two phases, the first dating to the 8–9th centuries, dominated by imagery described as Mahayana by Donaldson, followed by a second phase of the 10th and 11th centuries, with mainly Vajrayana choice of subjects and imagery. However, some other scholars question these descriptions, seeing evidence of Tantricism in the earlier phase as well. The issue revolves around the choice of deities, and the form, aspect or just the pose and iconography in which they are depicted.

The site features statues of Tara, Avalokiteshvara, Manjusri, Aparajita, Hariti and a range of other bodhisattvas. Ratnagiri is notable for a larger proportion of female figures than other groups of Buddhist sculpture, which has been connected with an increasing interest in esoteric forms of Buddhism, though writers disagree over which traditions were involved.

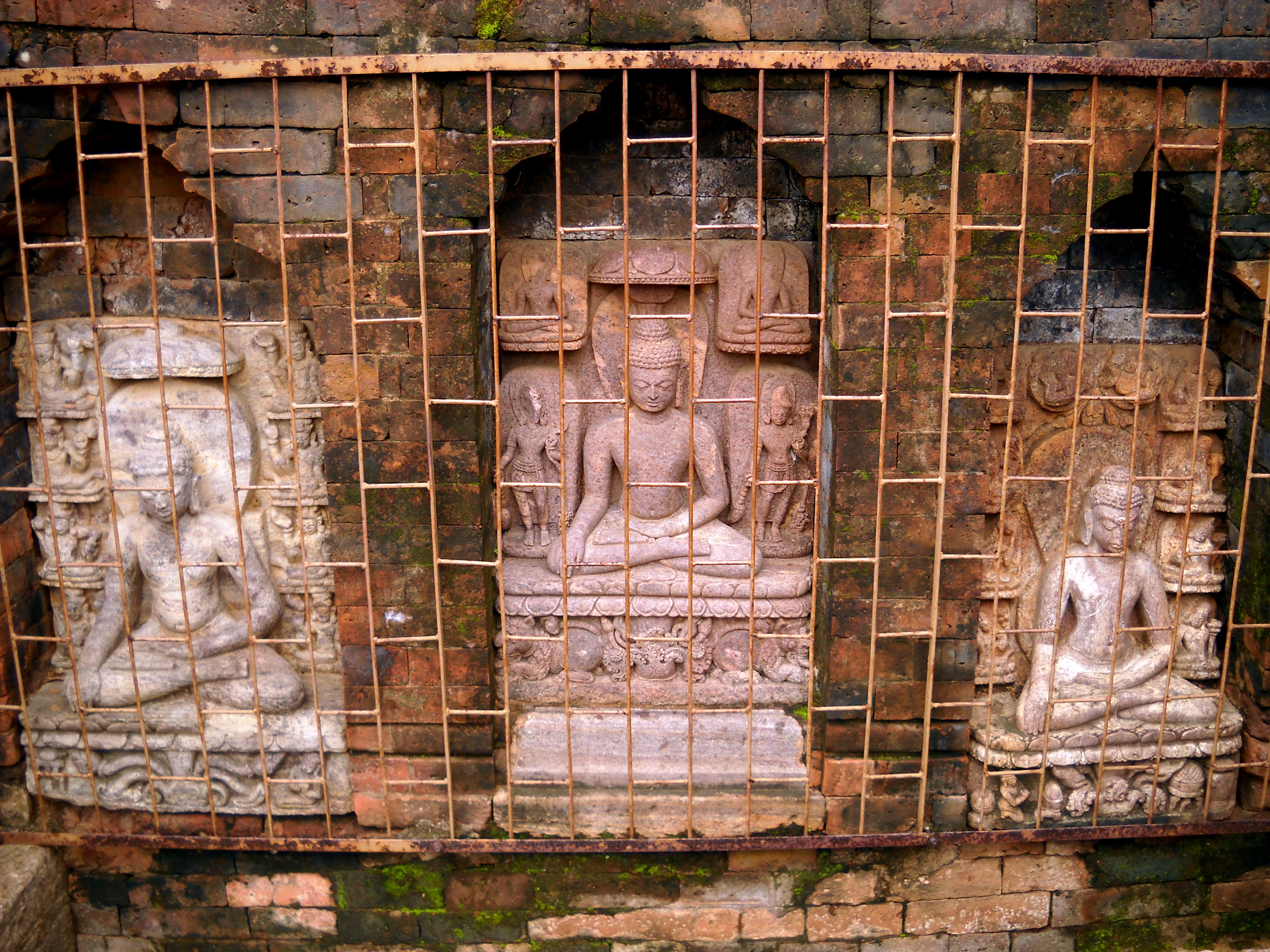
Sculptures now protected by a grille

Apart from the clay seals mentioned above, only three inscriptions of any significance have been found at the site, all extracts from Buddhist texts, in two cases dealing with the rewards accruing to those who erect stupas. One is carved on stone slabs, another written on terracotta plaques before firing, and one engraved on the back of a sculpture.

A growing number of images of "wrathful deities", that is, fierce "aspects" of enlightened Buddhas, Bodhisattvas or Devas (divine beings), may be taken as evidence of a turn towards esoteric Buddhism. Examples include Heruka. Two small scenes, now difficult to interpret, seem to show erotic activity combined with the cutting of hair. These are very rare, and may relate to the practice, described in some Hindu Tantric texts but no known Buddhist ones, of offering both semen and cut hair to a deity (Kali especially). They are on the later second and third facades to the main shrine room.

== Museums ==
The Ratnagiri museum occupies a purpose-built modern building at the site. It has three storeys and four galleries, with a range of objects found on the site on display. Three galleries mainly feature stone sculpture, and the fourth bronze and ivory sculptures, terracottas, clay seals, inscribed copper plates, and other finds.

Other sculptures are "scattered in local villages", and several are in museums, including the Patna Museum, Indian Museum, Kolkata, National Museum, New Delhi, and Odisha State Museum in Bhubaneswar. The only holding outside India mentioned by Donaldson is a figure in the Brooklyn Museum, New York.

== Diamond Triangle ==
Together with the comparable nearby monastic sites of Lalitgiri and Udayagiri, it is part of the so-called "Diamond Triangle" of the "Ratnagiri-Udayagiri-Lalitgiri" sites. It used to be thought that one or all of these were the Pushpagiri Vihara known from ancient records, but this has now convincingly located at a different site. As the crow flies, Ratnagiri and Udaygiri are about 11 km apart, and both about 7 km from Lalitgiri. The site now recognised as Puspagiri is some 18 km distant from Udaygiri, the closest to it of the "triangle" sites.

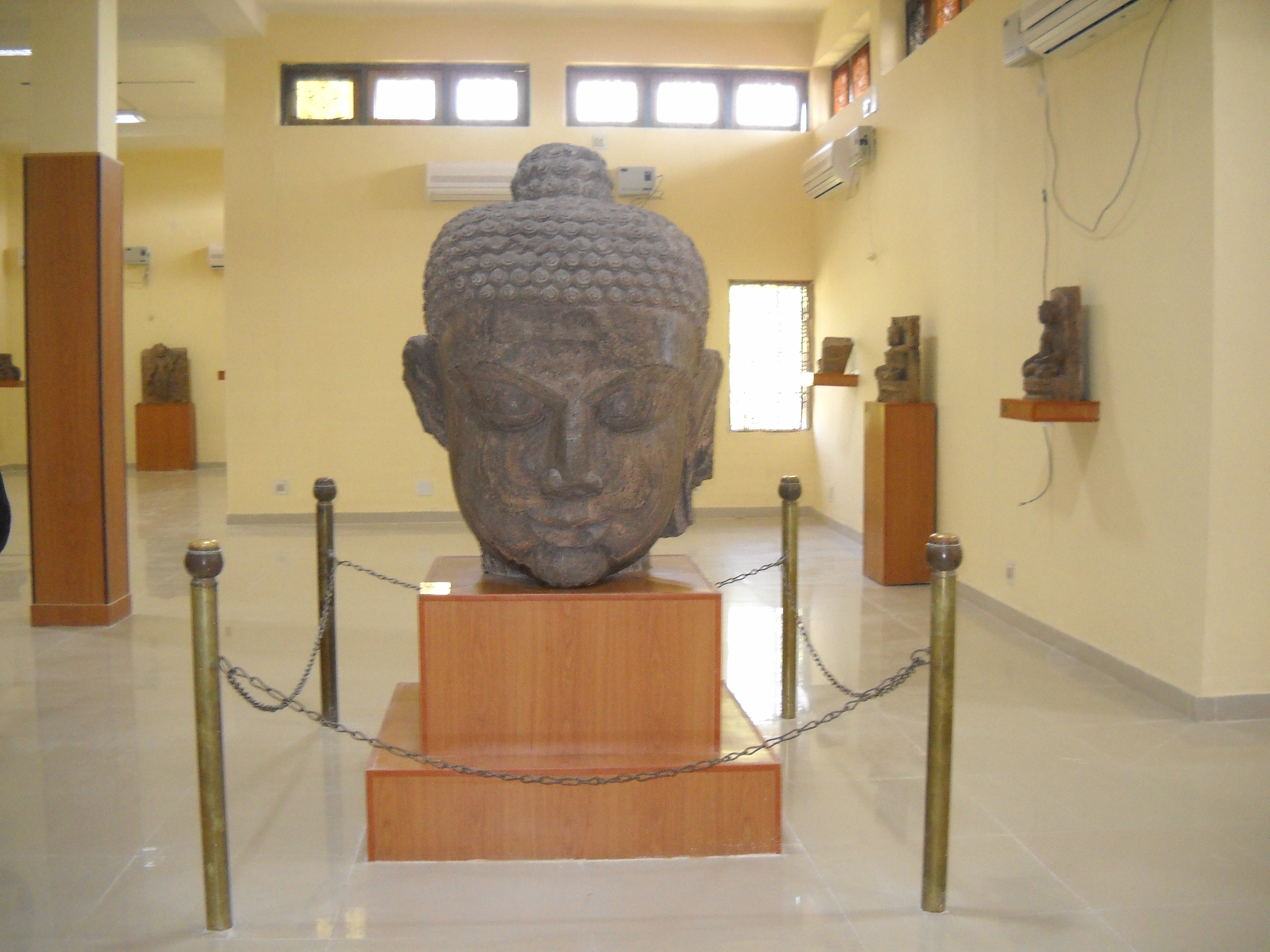
Colossal Buddha head, in the Ratnagiri Museum

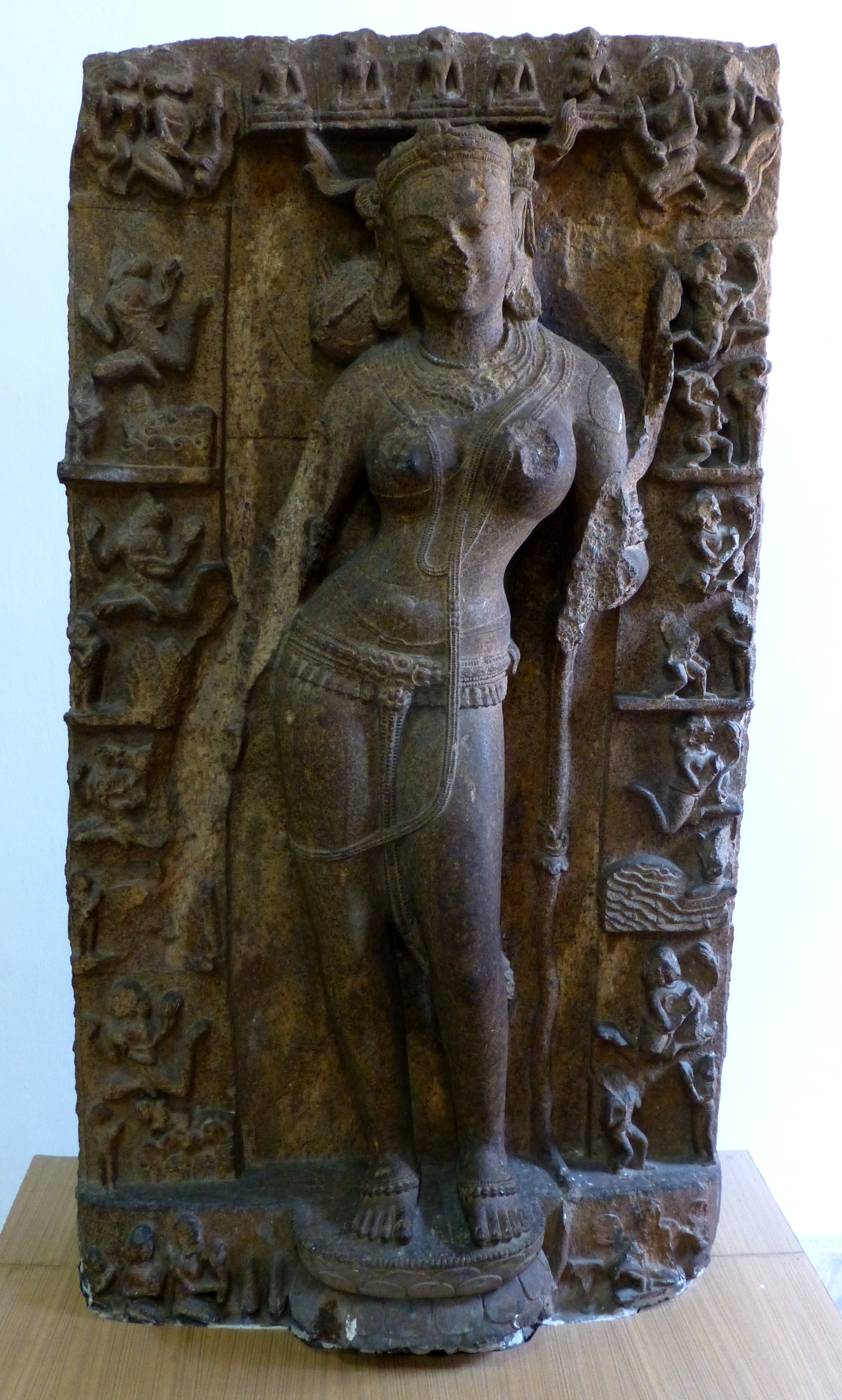
Tara in the Patna Museum

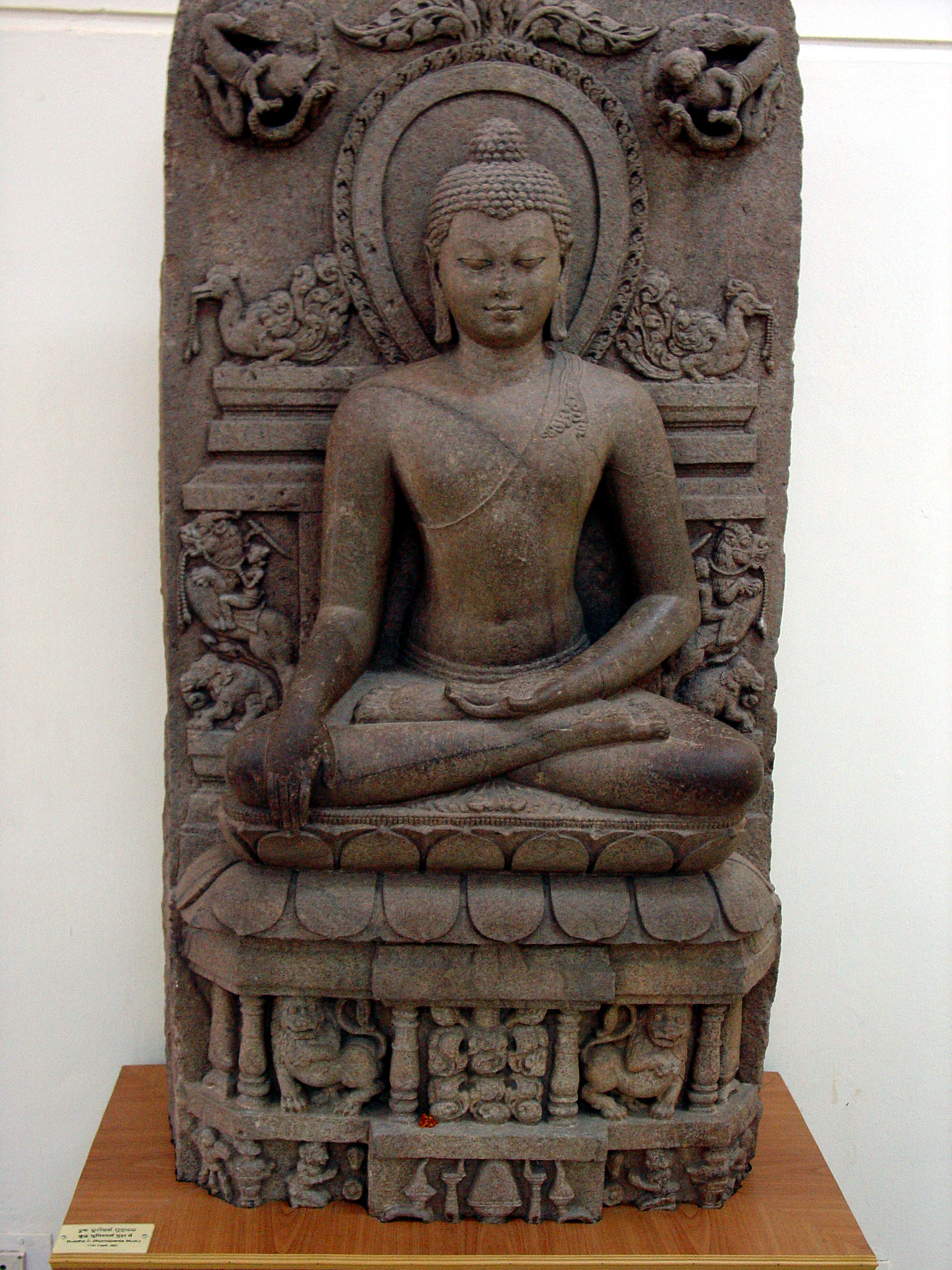
Seated Buddha, 11th century, in Ratnagiri Museum

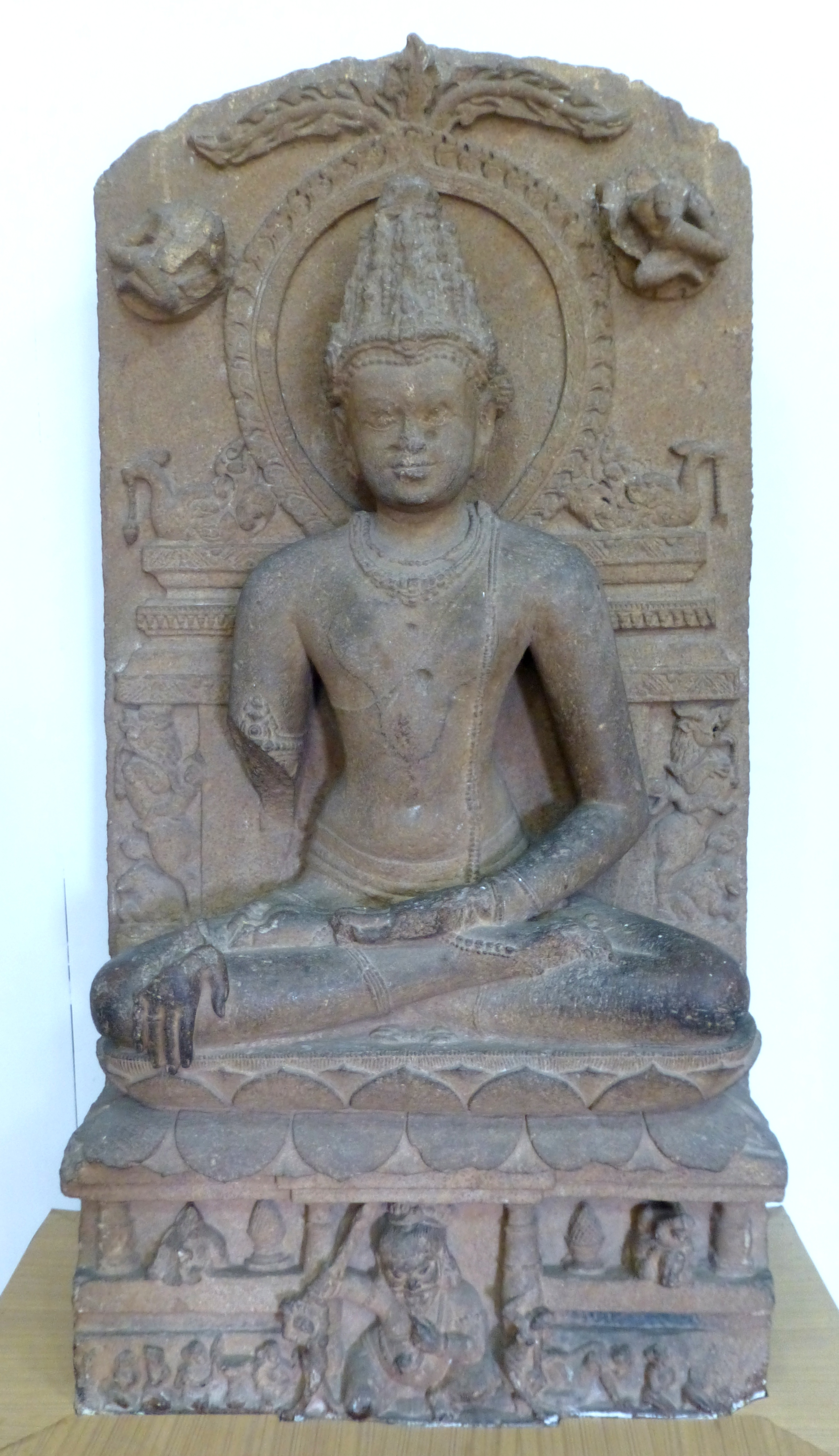
Crowned Buddha calling Earth, 11th century, in Patna Museum

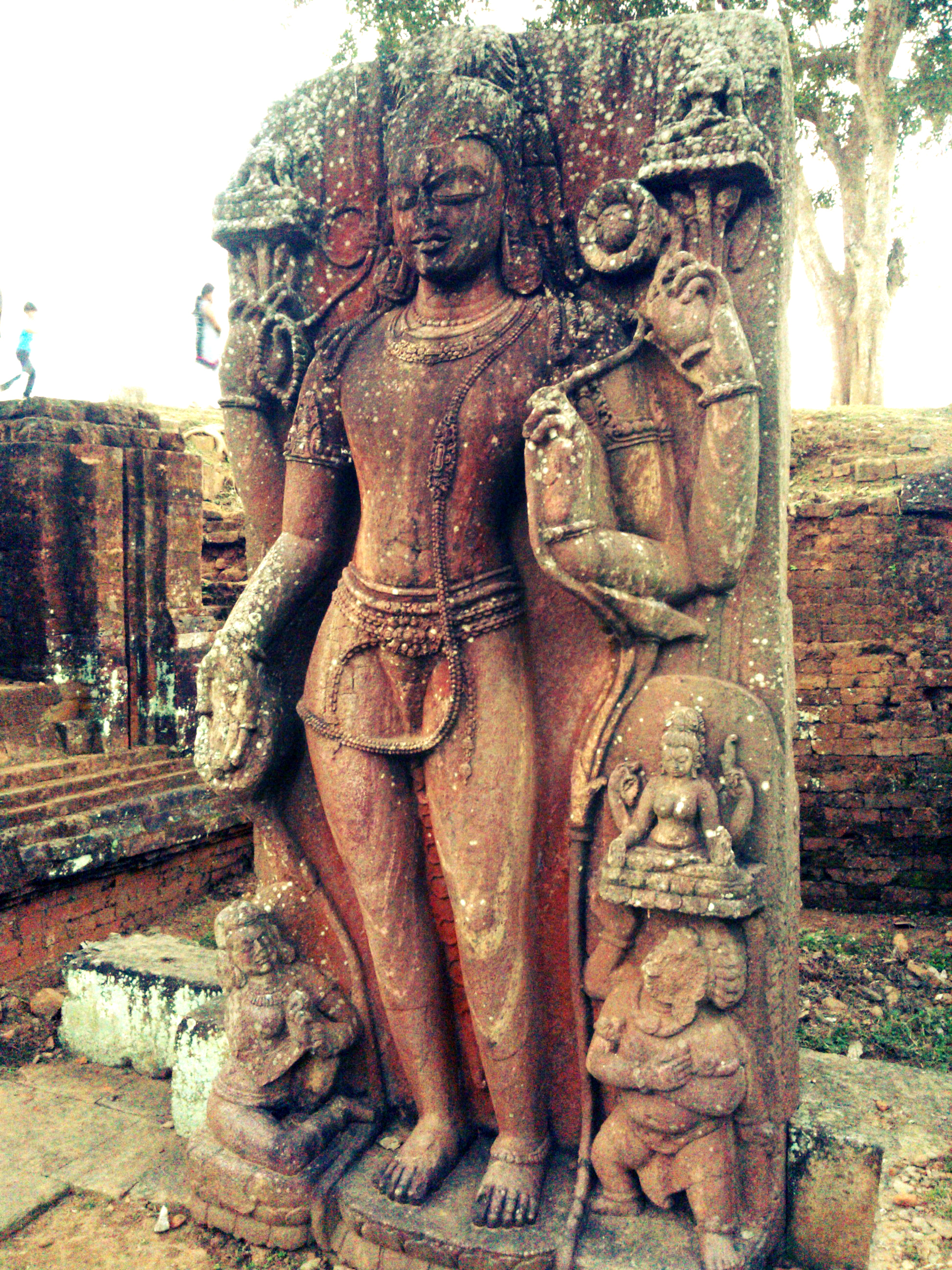
Vajrapani relief panel

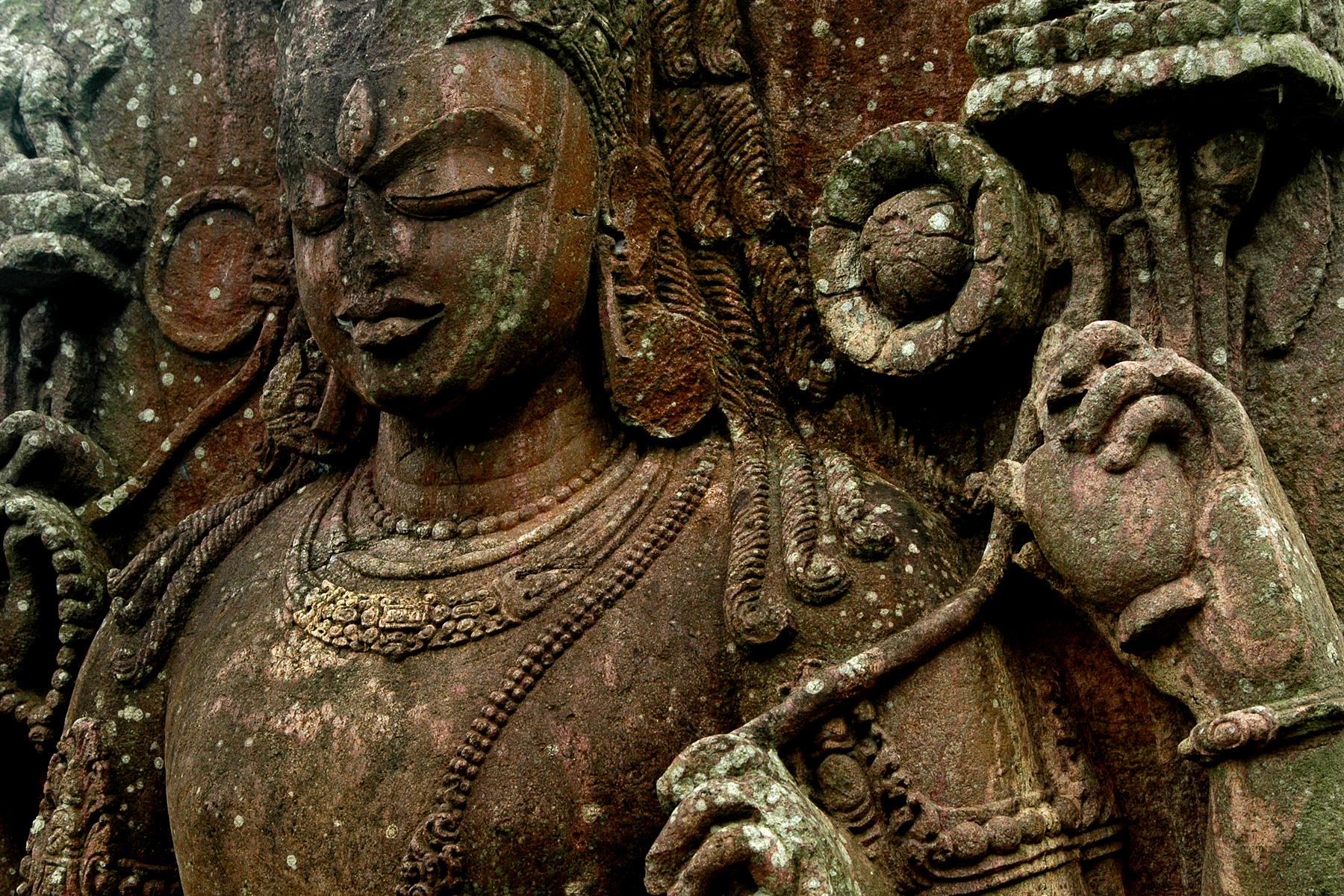
Detail of last

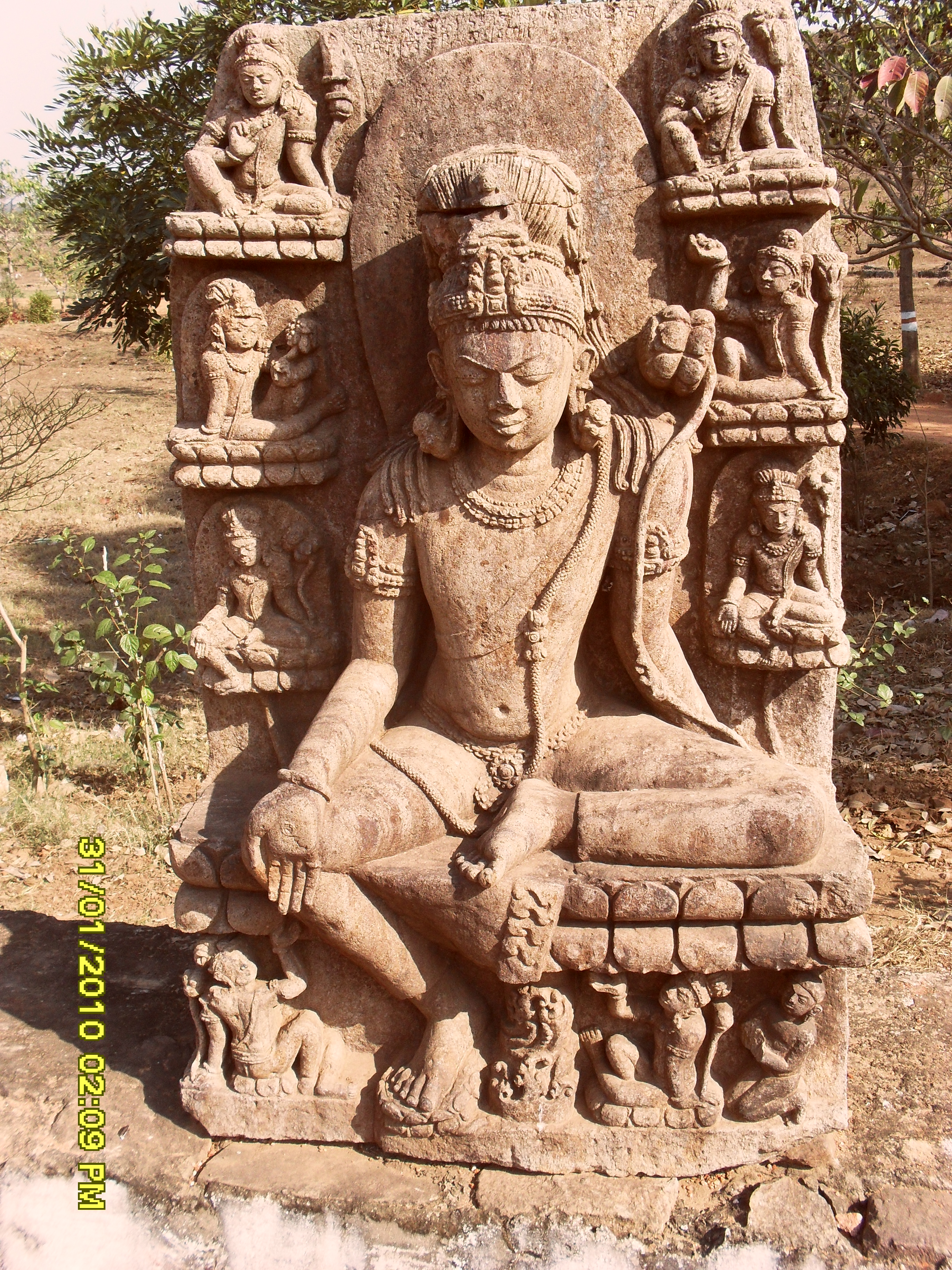
Relief panel

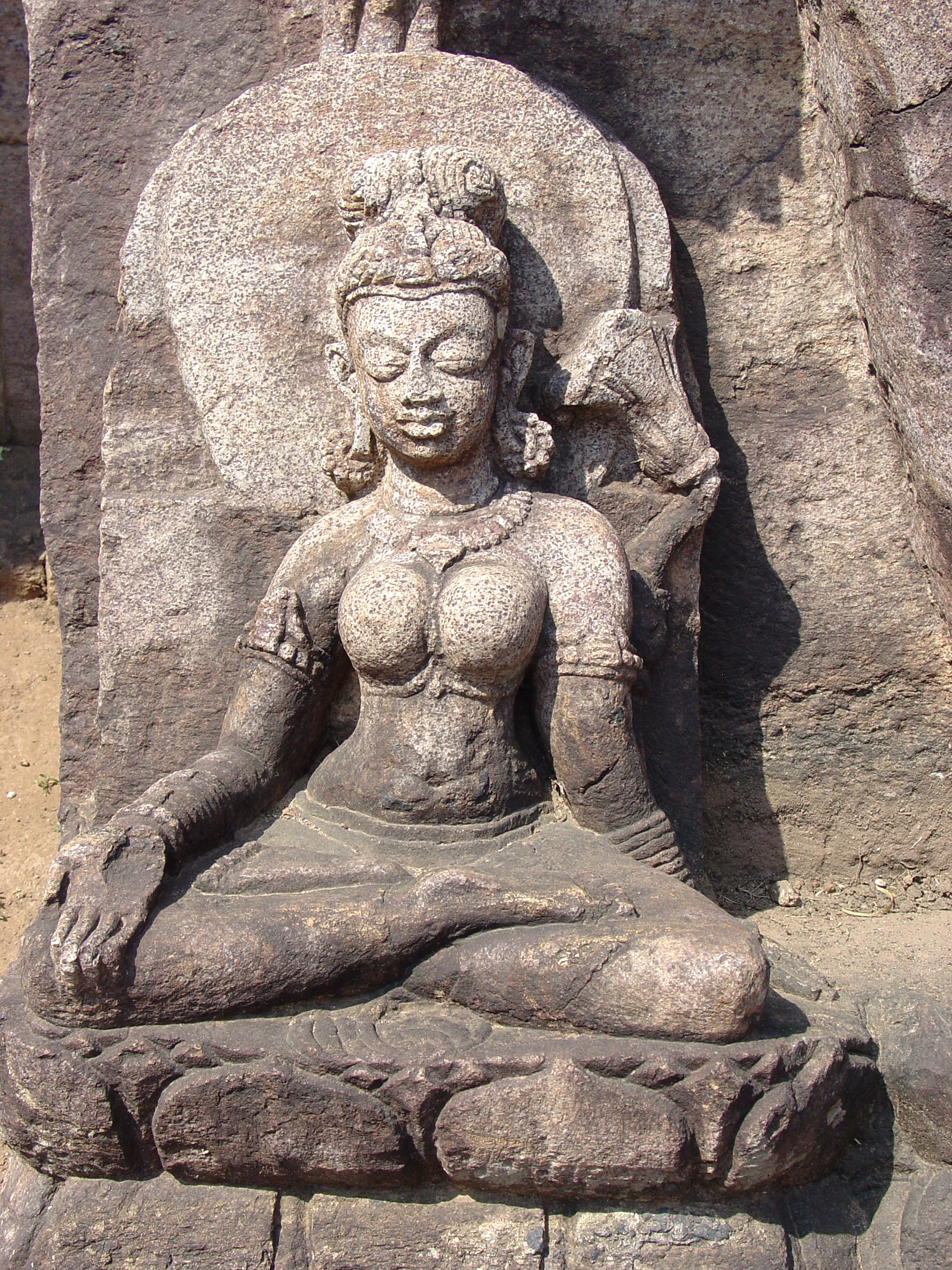
Seated Tara, minor figure from next photo (bottom left)

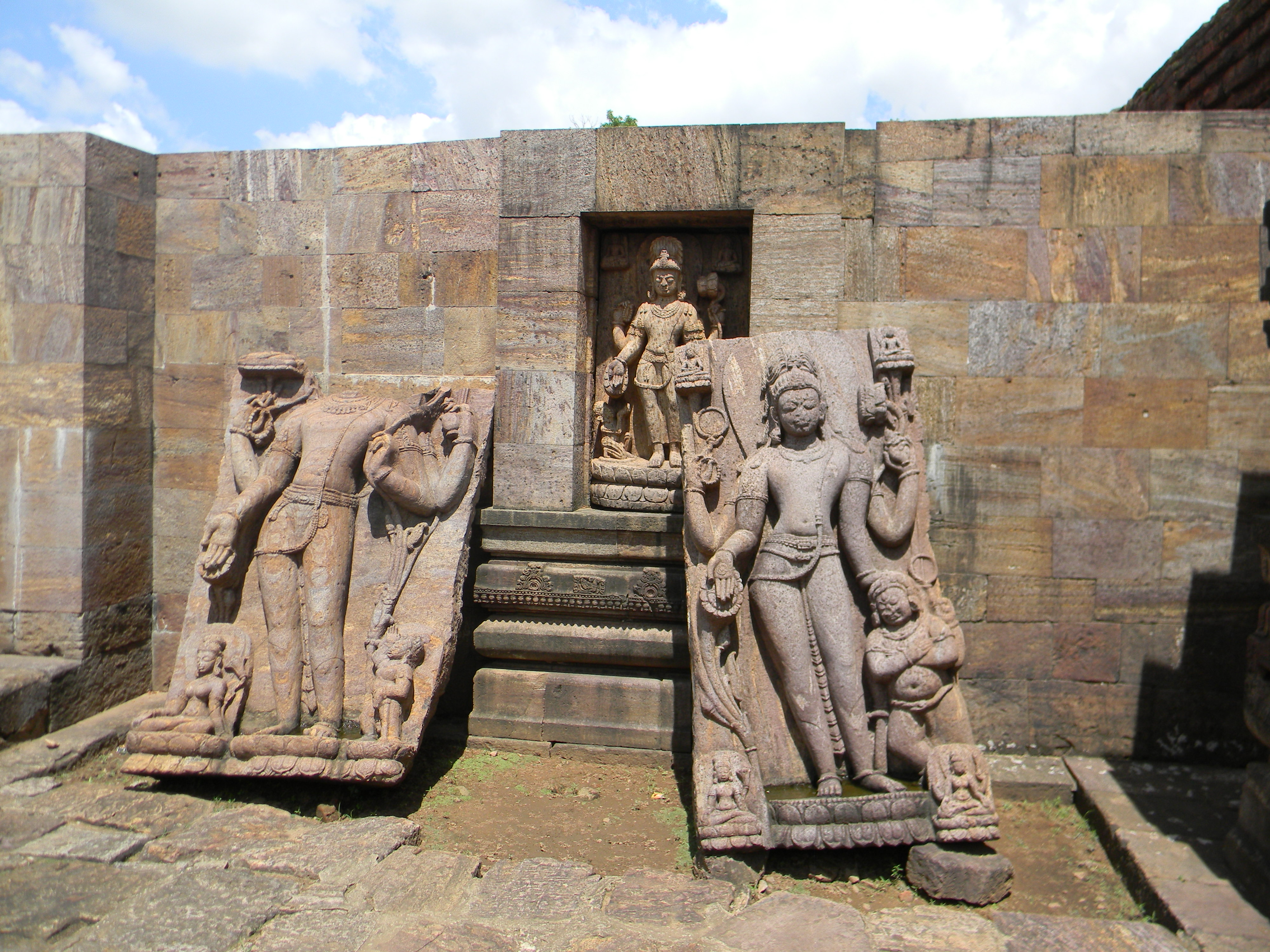
Statues in porch, Avalokiteshvara at centre.

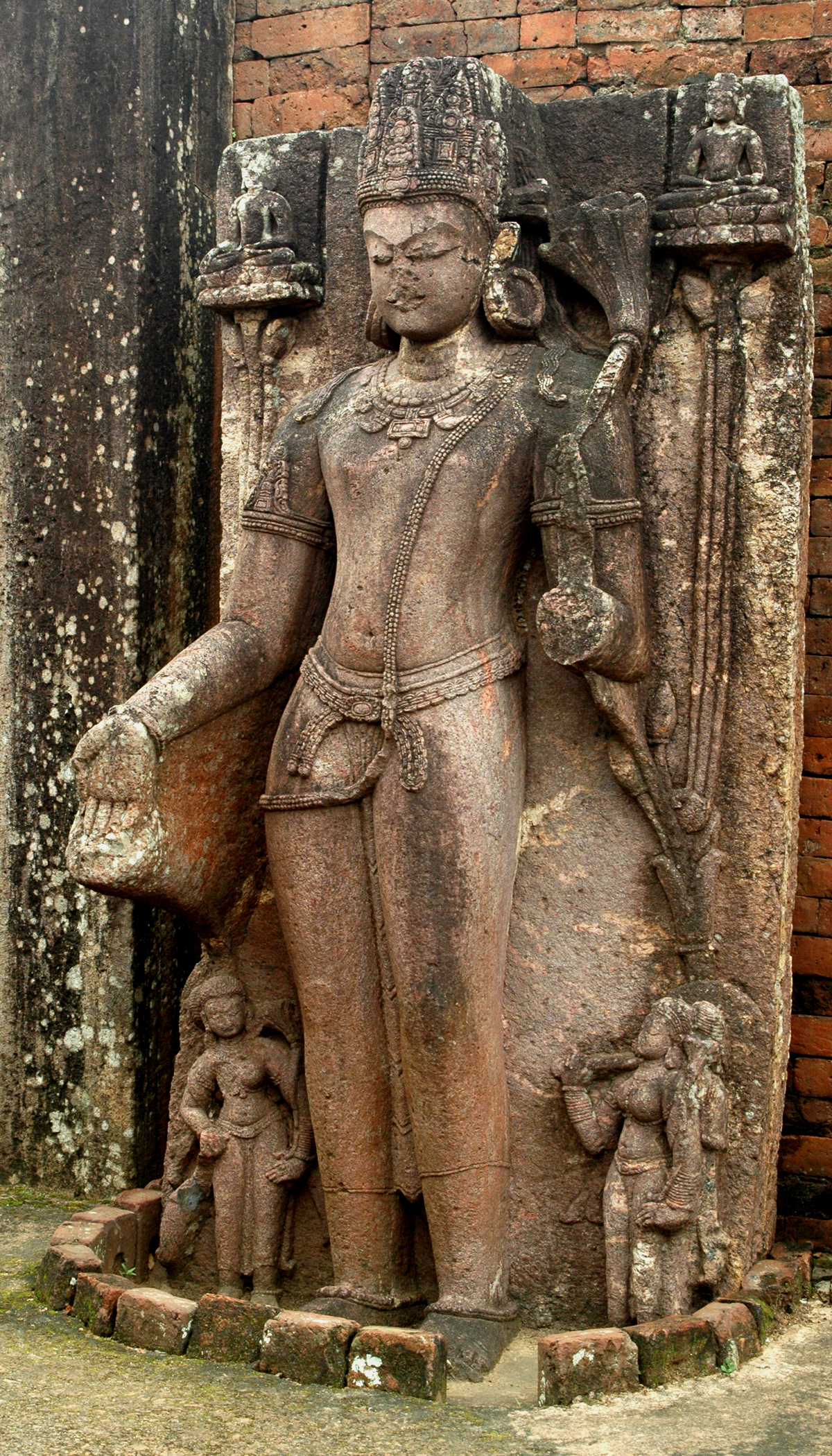
Relief "standing figure of Manjushri" in the Buddhist temple.
