= Chamara =

Chamara (Sinhala: චාමර, Pronounced: chā-mɘ-rɘ) is a Sinhalese name that may refer to the following notable people:

Given name

- Chamara Dunusinghe (born 1970), Sri Lankan cricketer
- Chamara Fernando (born 1988), Sri Lankan cricketer
- Chamara Janaraj Peiris (born 1970), Sri Lankan journalist, screenplay writer, television director and filmmaker
- Chamara Kapugedera (born 1987), Sri Lankan cricketer
- Chamara Lasantha (born 1981), Sri Lankan cricketer
- Chamara Repiyallage (born 1992), Sri Lankan judoka
- Chamara Sampath Dassanayake, Sri Lankan politician
- Chamara Silva (born 1979), Sri Lankan cricketer
- Chamara de Soysa (born 1978), Sri Lankan cricketer

Surname

- Hashan Chamara (born 1995), Sri Lankan cricketer
- Iresh Chamara (born 1994), Sri Lankan cricketer
- Nuwan Chamara (born 1983), Sri Lankan cricketer

== See also ==
- Fly-whisk, also known as chāmara
- Cāmara yoga
