= List of heritage sites in Odisha =

List of heritage sites in Odisha is a compilation of notable cultural, historical, architectural, and archaeological sites located in the Indian state of Odisha. The state is known for its rich heritage, which spans ancient Kalinga architecture, Buddhist monastic complexes, medieval temples, and colonial-era structures.

Odisha possesses a diverse range of heritage sites protected at different levels, including monuments recognized by the Archaeological Survey of India (ASI), State Protected Monuments, and sites listed under the UNESCO World Heritage and Tentative Lists. The state has over 200 protected monuments and thousands of unprotected heritage structures.

The Sun Temple at Konark is the only site in Odisha inscribed as a UNESCO World Heritage Site (since 1984). Additionally, the Buddhist complexes of Lalitgiri, Udayagiri, and Ratnagiri, collectively known as the "Diamond Triangle", are included in India's UNESCO Tentative List.

== UNESCO World Heritage Site ==
Site	Location	Type	Year Inscribed	Description
Konark Sun Temple	Konark, Puri district	Cultural	1984	A 13th-century temple dedicated to the Sun God Surya, designed as a colossal chariot with intricately carved stone wheels and horses.

== UNESCO Tentative List ==
Site	Location	Type	Description
Lalitgiri	Cuttack district	Cultural	One of the oldest Buddhist sites in Odisha, featuring stupas, monasteries, and relics.
Udayagiri	Jajpur district	Cultural	A major Buddhist complex known for its monasteries and sculptural remains.
Ratnagiri	Jajpur district	Cultural	A prominent center of Vajrayana Buddhism with extensive ruins of monasteries and stupas.

== Major heritage temples ==
Site	Location	Period	Description
Jagannath Temple, Puri	Puri	12th century	One of the Char Dham pilgrimage sites dedicated to Lord Jagannath.
Lingaraj Temple	Bhubaneswar	11th century	A classic example of Kalinga architecture dedicated to Lord Shiva.
Mukteshvara Temple	Bhubaneswar	10th century	Known for its ornate torana (archway) and intricate carvings.
Rajarani Temple	Bhubaneswar	11th century	Famous for its unique red and yellow sandstone architecture.
Ananta Vasudeva Temple	Bhubaneswar	13th century	Dedicated to Lord Krishna and one of the few Vaishnavite temples in Bhubaneswar.

== Buddhist heritage sites ==
Site	Location	Period	Description
Dhauli	Bhubaneswar	3rd century BCE	Site associated with the Kalinga War and Ashokan edicts.
Lalitgiri	Cuttack district	1st century CE	Early Buddhist settlement with relics and monasteries.
Udayagiri	Jajpur district	2nd century BCE	Largest Buddhist complex in Odisha.
Ratnagiri	Jajpur district	5th century CE	Major center of Buddhist learning.

== Rock-cut caves and archaeological sites ==
Site	Location	Period	Description
Udayagiri and Khandagiri Caves	Bhubaneswar	2nd century BCE	Ancient Jain rock-cut caves built during the reign of King Kharavela.
Sisupalgarh	Bhubaneswar	3rd century BCE	One of the earliest fortified urban settlements in eastern India.
Langudi Hills	Jajpur district	Ancient	Archaeological site with Buddhist remains and stupas.

== Forts and palaces ==
Site	Location	Period	Description
Barabati Fort	Cuttack	14th century	Historic fort built by the Eastern Ganga dynasty.
Sisupalgarh	Bhubaneswar	Ancient	Fortified settlement with archaeological significance.
Dhenkanal Palace	Dhenkanal	Colonial era	Residence of the royal family of Dhenkanal.

== Other notable heritage sites ==
Site	Location	Type	Description
Chilika Lake	Odisha coast	Natural heritage	Asia's largest brackish water lagoon known for biodiversity.
Hirakud Dam	Sambalpur	Industrial heritage	One of the longest earthen dams in the world.
Pipili	Puri district	Cultural heritage	Famous for traditional appliqué handicrafts.

== See also ==
- Tourism in Odisha
- List of State Protected Monuments in Odisha
- List of Monuments of National Importance in Odisha
- Culture of Odisha
