= Arabal =

- Village
- Interactive map of Arabal
- Coordinates: 20.56°N 85.63°E
- Country: India
- State: Odisha

Government
  - Sarpanch: Nirmal Samal

Population
  - Total: 3,411

Languages
  - Official: Oriya, Hindi, English
- Time zone: UTC+5:30 (IST)
- PIN: 755005
- Vehicle registration: OD-04, OD-34
- Nearest city: Jaraka
- Literacy: 86.19%
- Climate: Aw (Köppen)
- Precipitation: 1,014 millimetres (39.9 in)
- Avg. summer temperature: 38 °C (100 °F)
- Avg. winter temperature: 12 °C (54 °F)
- Website: www.jajpur.nic.in

Arabal is a village in Dharmasala Block of Jajpur District Odisha, India. It is located at the bank of the River Kelua. Arabal 12 km from its block Dharmasala. The village is bounded by Janak on its south, Kotapur on its west, Bandhadiha on its north and Nathapur on its east.

== Geography ==
The village is 2 square kilometres (0.77 sq mi) in area, of which .8 square kilometres (0.31 sq mi) is forested. The population is approx. 2500 and the literacy rate is 86.19%. Annual rainfall is 1,771.8 millimetres (69.76 in).

== Agriculture ==
Rice is traditionally grown in two well defined seasons, of which the rainy season is the most important, covering over 85% of the total rice area. It depends entirely on the southwest monsoon, and is sown in June and harvested in October–December. Almonds are grown as a cash crop.

== Population ==
The total population of Arabal is 3411. There are 746 houses in the village.

== Population by Sex ==
There are total of 1699 male persons and 1712 females and a total number of 425 children below 6 years in Arabal. The percentage of male population is 49.81%. The percentage of female population is 50.19%. The percentage of child population is 12.46%. Males: 1699. Females: 1712. Children: 425.
