= Bandhadiha =

- Village
- Location in Orissa, India
- Coordinates: 20.56°N 85.63°E
- Country: India
- State: Odisha

Government
  - Sarpanch: Bijay Kumar Jena

Languages
  - Official: Oriya, Hindi, English
- Time zone: UTC+5:30 (IST)
- PIN: 755005
- Vehicle registration: OD-04
- Nearest city: Jaraka
- Literacy: 86.19%
- Climate: Aw (Köppen)
- Precipitation: 1,014 millimetres (39.9 in)
- Avg. summer temperature: 38 °C (100 °F)
- Avg. winter temperature: 12 °C (54 °F)
- Website: www.jajpur.nic.in

Bandhadiha is a village in the Rasalupur Block of Jajpur District Odisha, India. It is located at the bank of the Brahmani River. Bandhadiha 20 km from its block Rasalupur. The village is bounded by Janak on its south, Kotapur on its west, Nathapur on its north and Arabal on its east.

== Geography ==
The village is 2 square kilometres (0.77 sq mi) in area, of which .8 square kilometres (0.31 sq mi) is forested. The population is approx. 2500 and the literacy rate is 86.19%. Annual rainfall is 1,771.8 millimetres (69.76 in).

== See also ==
- Jaraka
