= Pushpagiri Vihara =

Buddhist site in Odisha, India

Puspagiri
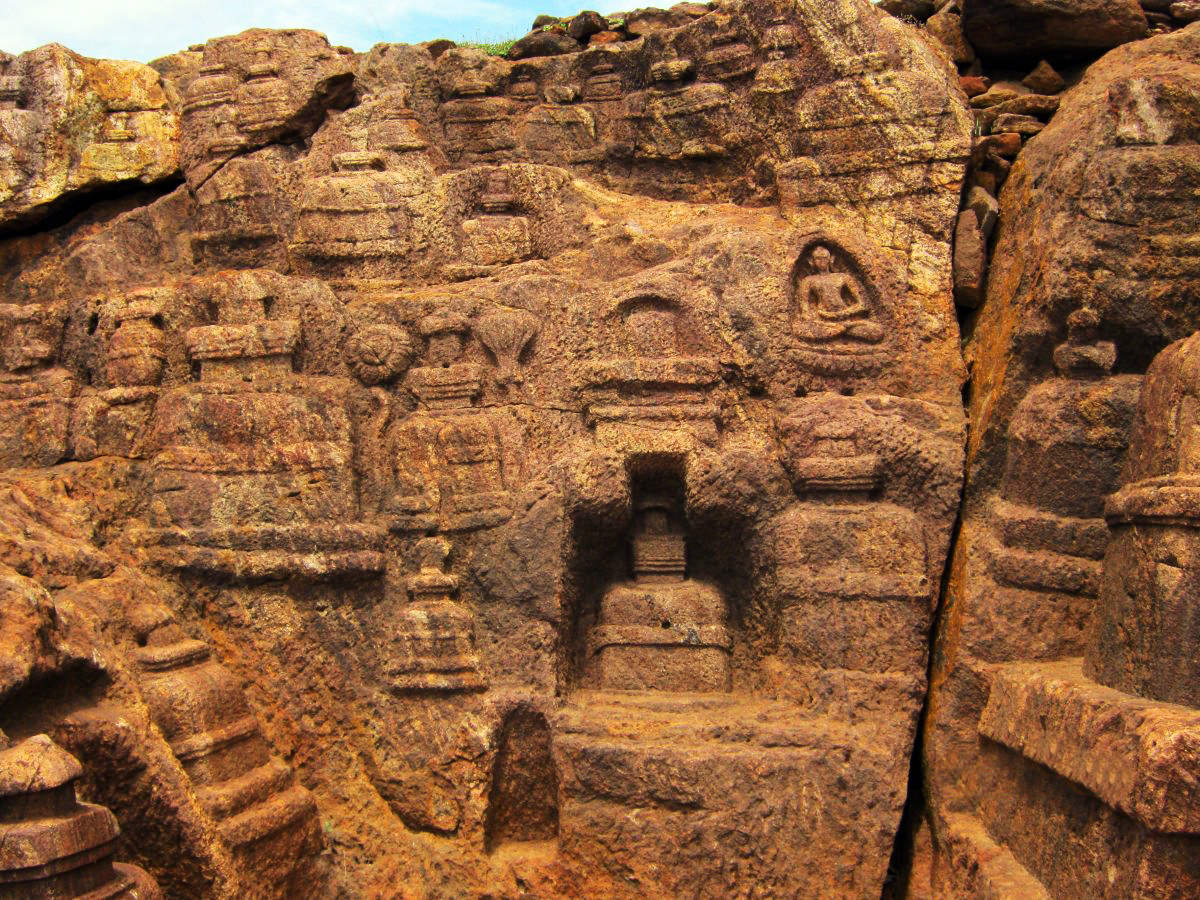
- Carvings on a rock face

- Location within Odisha Location within India

Religion
- Affiliation: Buddhism
- District: Jajpur
- Region: Eastern India
- Status: Preserved

Location
- Location: India
- State: Odisha
- Coordinates: 20.722739°N 86.190338°E

Pushpagiri (Odia: ପୁଷ୍ପଗିରି) was an ancient Indian mahavihara or monastic complex located atop Langudi Hill (or Hills) in Jajpur district of Odisha, India. Pushpagiri was mentioned in the writings of the Chinese traveller Xuanzang (c. 602 – c. 664) and some other ancient sources. Until the 1990s, it was hypothesised to be one or all of the Lalitgiri-Ratnagiri-Udayagiri group of monastic sites, also located in Jajpur district. These sites contain ruins of many buildings, stupas of various sizes, sculptures (many now removed to museums), and other artifacts.

However, archaeological excavations conducted at Langudi Hills during 1996-2006 resulted in the discovery of another site, with inscriptions describing the local monastery as puṣpa sabhar giriya, and identified by the excavators as Pushpagiri. This has now become the general view among scholars. The site has now been made accessible for tourism.

The visit of Xuanzang indicates that Pushpagiri was an important Buddhist site in ancient India. Along with Nalanda, Vikramashila, Odantapuri, Takshashila and Vallabhi, it is believed to be a major ancient centre of learning. It flourished between 3rd and 11th centuries CE.

== Historical mentions ==
The Chinese traveler Xuanzang (c. 602–644) describes a sangharama (monastery) named Pu-se-p'o-k'i-li in the south-west region of a country, whose name is variously transliterated as U-Cha or Wu-T-U. Scholars such as Stanislas Julien and Samuel Beal restored Pu-se-po-k'i-li as "Pushpagiri", and name of the country as Ota or "Udra". Scholars identify this country as Odra in present-day Odisha. Xuanzang describes the monastery as follows:

In the south-west of the country was the Pu-sie-p'o-k'i-li monastery in a mountain; the stone top of this monastery exhibited supernatural lights and other miracles, sunshades placed by worshippers on it between the dome and the amalaka remained there like needles held by a magnet.

A 3rd century inscription of the Andhra Ikshvaku king Vira-purusha-datta, found at Nagarjunakonda (in present-day Andhra Pradesh), mentions that an upasika named Bodhisiri made numerous endowments to Buddhist establishments. One of these included sponsoring the erection of a stone mandapa at "Puphagiri". According to Thomas E. Donaldson, this is likely same as the Pushpagiri mentioned in Xuanzang's records ("Puphagiri" being the Pali form of the Sanskrit "Pushpagiri), and was located in the present-day Odisha. Pratapaditya Pal notes that if this identification is true, the site in Odisha must have been established by at least 3rd century. However, some other scholars, such as Dineshchandra Sircar and B. S. L. Hanumantha Rao, identify this "Puphagiri" with Pushpagiri Temple Complex in the present-day Cuddapah District of Andhra Pradesh.

The 9th century Buddhist monk Prajna, after spending 18 years in various places including Nalanda, settled in an unnamed monastery of Wu-ch'a (identified with Odra), before going to China. A few scholars, such as Prabhat Mukherjee, identify this monastery with Pushpagiri. Xuanzang, the Chinese Buddhist scholar and traveler, visited the site and referred to it as "Puspagiri." The Mahastupa located here is one of the ten illustrious stupas that Emperor Ashoka is said to have erected.

== Identification ==
Location of Pushpagiri on Langudi Hill (star), Lalitgiri (yellow circle), Ratnagiri (green circle) and Udayagiri (blue circle) As the crow flies, Ratnagiri and Udaygiri are about 11 km (6.8 mi) apart, and both about 7 km (4.3 mi) from Lalitgiri

In the 20th century, a number of scholars identified the Pushpagiri mentioned in Xuanzang's records with various sites in present-day Odisha. Ramaprasad Chanda (1930) of the Archaeological Survey of India believed that either Udayagiri or Lalitgiri could be the historical Pushpagiri. Based on archaeological finds, K. C. Panigrahi (1961) hypothesized that Udayagiri, Lalitgiri and Ratnagiri formed a common complex, which was called Pushpagiri. As the crow flies, Ratnagiri and Udaygiri are about 11 km (6.8 mi) apart, and both about 7 km (4.3 mi) from Lalitgiri. N. K. Sahu (1958) placed Pushpagiri somewhere in the Phulbani- Ghumsur region, based on geographical descriptions in Xuanzang's works.

In 1985, the Archaeological Survey of India (ASI) started excavation at Lalitgiri to confirm its relation to Pushpagiri. The excavation led to several important archaeological discoveries, but none of these confirmed the identification of Lalitgiri with Pushpagiri.

=== Langudi Hill excavations ===
In the 1990s, college lecturer Harish Chandra Prusty discovered a Buddhist site on the Langudi Hill in Jajpur district. This is some 18 km (11 mi) distant from Udaygiri, the closest of the "triangle" sites, further up the river. In 1993, he and Pradeep Mohanty described the Langudi site in an article published in the Bulletin of the Deccan College Research Institute. In 1996, the Orissa Institute of Maritime and South East Asia Studies and the Odisha state's archaeology department started exploring the site. Between 1996 and 2006, the Institute carried out excavations of an area stretching over 143 acres (0.58 km^{2}).

A fragmented Brahmi inscription discovered at the site names the site as puṣpa sabhar giriya ("flower-filled hill"), identified by the excavators as Pushpagiri. In 2000, an excavation conducted by the institute, under the supervision of archaeologist Debraj Pradhan, resulted in the discovery of a large stupa as well as several other archaeological artifacts. The artifacts included pillars, a fragmentary Brahmi inscription, terracota seals and Northern Black Polished Ware. Debraj Pradhan believed the stupa to have been erected by the Mauryan emperor Ashoka (304–232 BCE): Although Xuanzang suggests that Odra had 10 stupas erected by Ashoka, this is the only one to have been discovered so far. According to B. N. Mukherjee of Calcutta University, who deciphered the Brahmi inscription, the stupa may have been erected by "a lay Buddhist worshipper called Ashoka".

By 2007, 34 rock-cut stupas of various sizes had been discovered on the northern part of the hill. A number of Buddhist rock-cut sculptures were discovered on the southern spur of the hill, including sculptures of Dhyani Buddhas in various postures. According to D. K. Dimri, the superintendent of the ASI's Orissa circle, the archaeological finds at the site cover a period between 1st century CE and 9th century CE, and suggest the existence of a major Buddhist monastic establishment. In 2007, the ASI took over the excavated site.

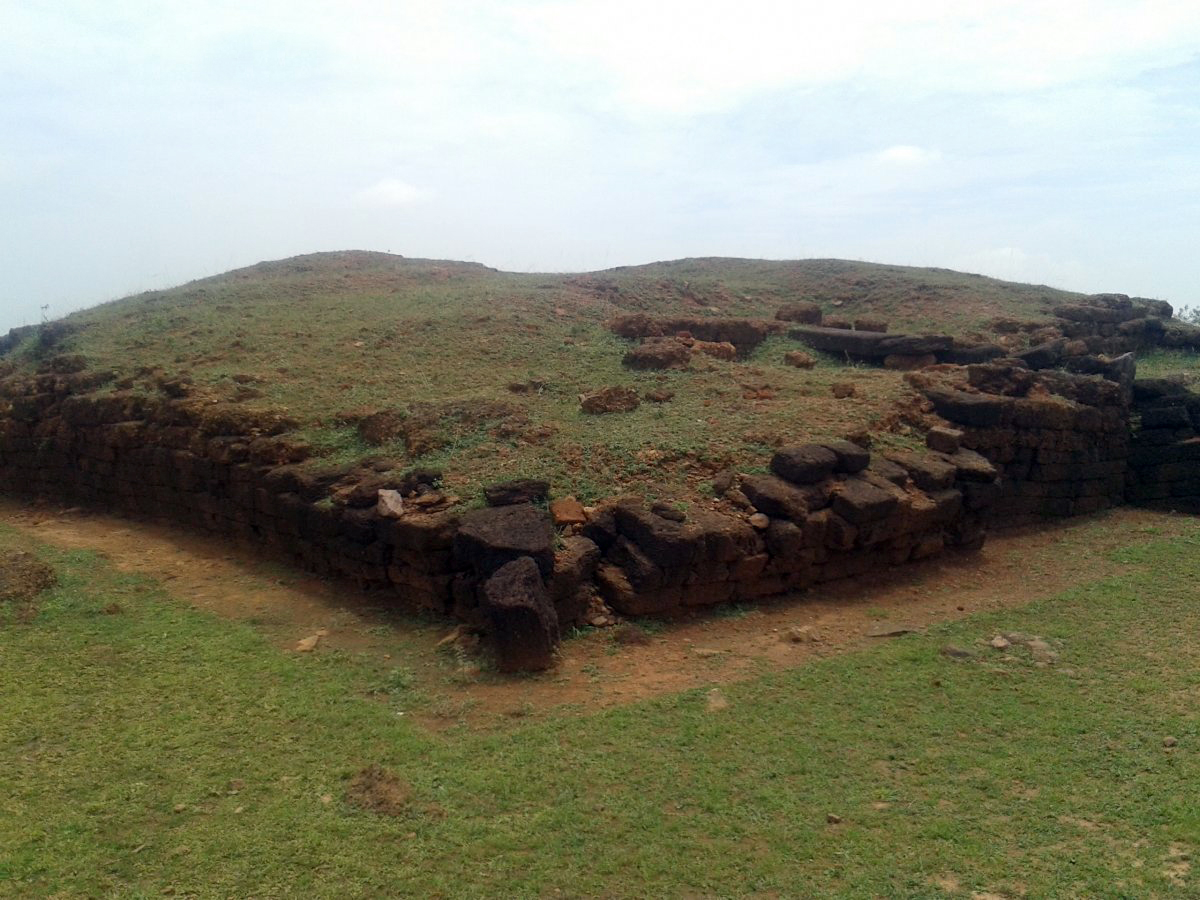
Ruins of the large stupa with a square base

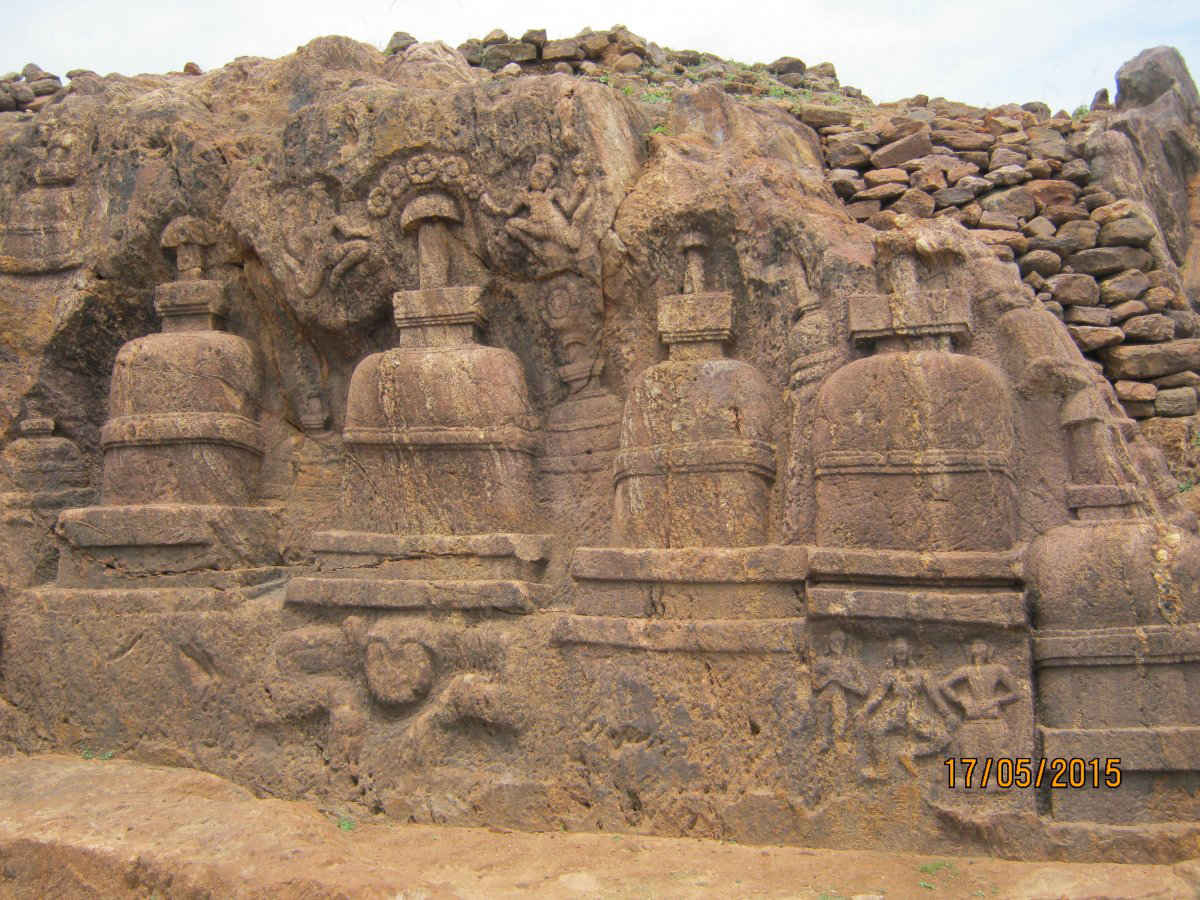
Rock-cut stupas

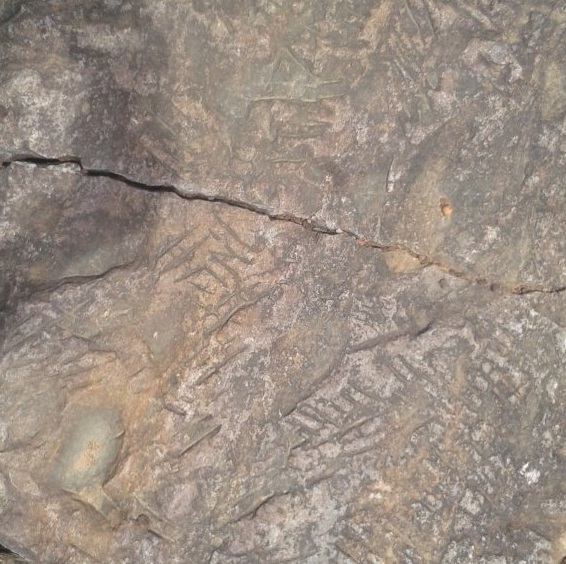
Pali stone inscription

== Tourism ==
In 2005, the Odisha State Government began developing the Langudi Hills site as a tourist place by constructing roads and other facilities.

There are other Buddhist attractions around Langudi hills. Kaima hill, in its immediate vicinity, contains a unique rock-cut elephant surrounded by four monolithic khondalite pillars; this dates from the Mauryan period in the 3rd century, BCE. Deuli, a hill situated in the confluence of the Brahmani and Kimiria rivers, has preserved five rock-cut Buddhist chambers inside caves. Additional Buddhist sites have been discovered at Bajragiri, Sarapur and Paikrapur. The Langudi sites are perhaps the largest historic Buddhist complex in India.

Langudi can be approached from Jaraka and Chandikhol on the National Highway 5, and is easily accessible from the urban centres of Cuttack and Bhubaneswar. The best months to visit the place are during October to February which are the cooler months.
