= Dhenkanal Palace =

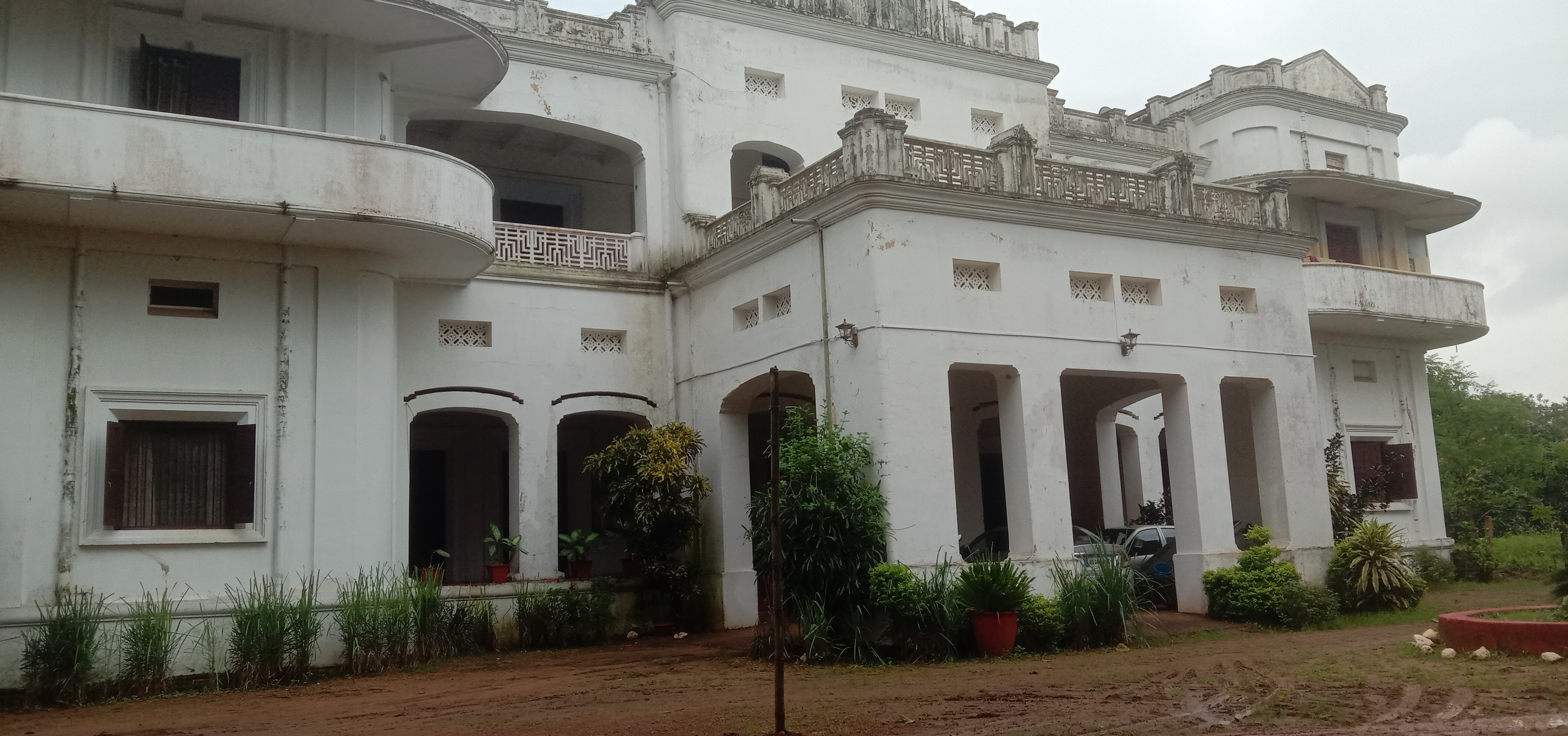
- The Façade
- Interactive map of Dhenkanal Palace
- 20°38′55.20″N 85°36′27.63″E
- Location: Dhenkanal, Odisha

History
- Built: latter part of 19th century

Site notes
- Owner: Brig Raja Kamakhya Prasad Singh Deo Mahindra Bahadur
- Website: www.dhenkanalpalace.com//

Dhenkanal Palace (Odia: ରାଜବାରି) is the official palace of the Bhoi dynasty of Dhenkanal princely state, India. Built by the Bhois of Dhenkanal, this palace is located in Dhenkanal town, Odisha.

This palace was turned into a homestay in 1992.

== Location ==
Dhenkanal Palace is located on the slopes of the Paniohala Hill in Dhenkanal.

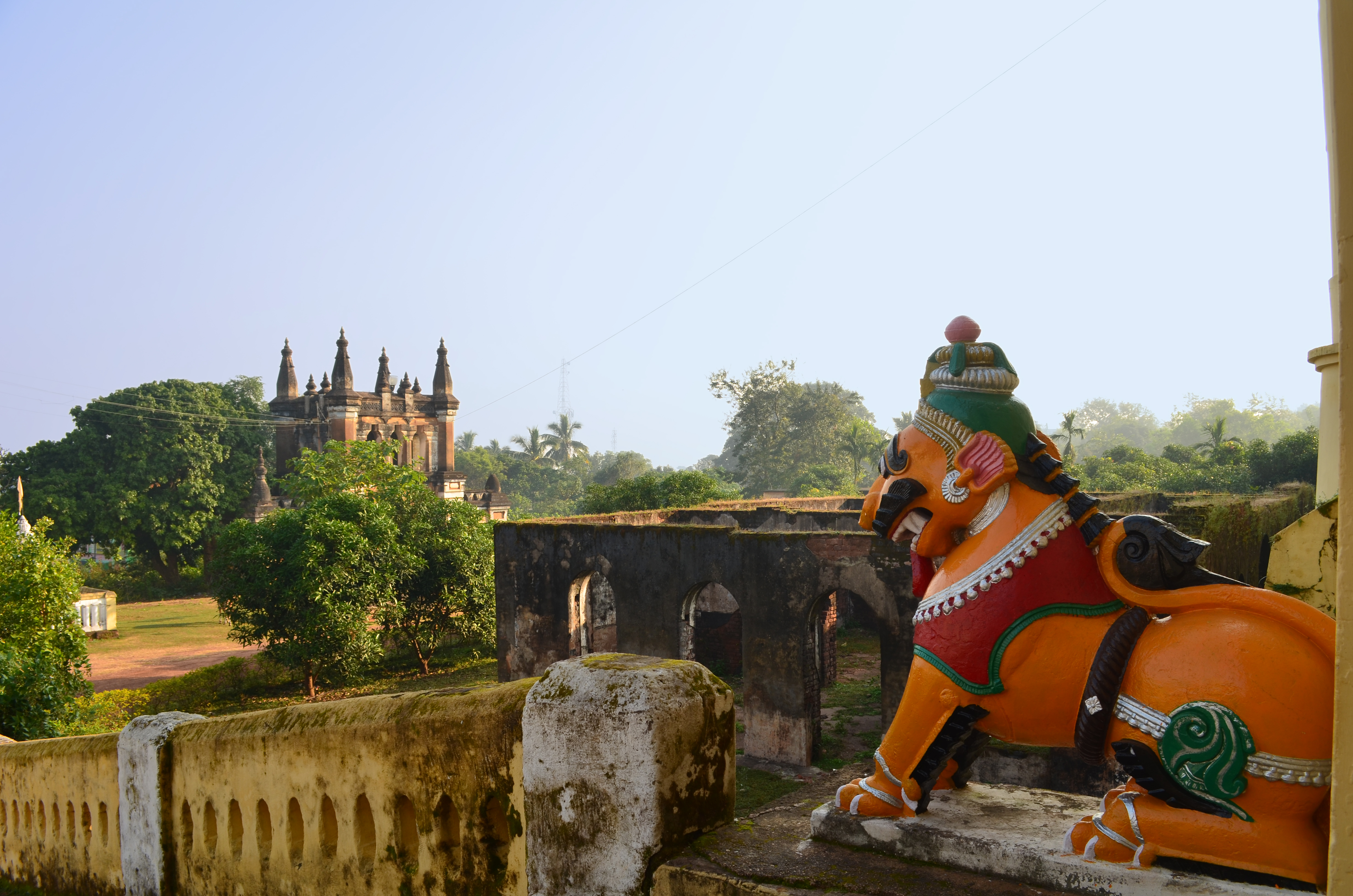
Outer gate of Dhenkanal Palace

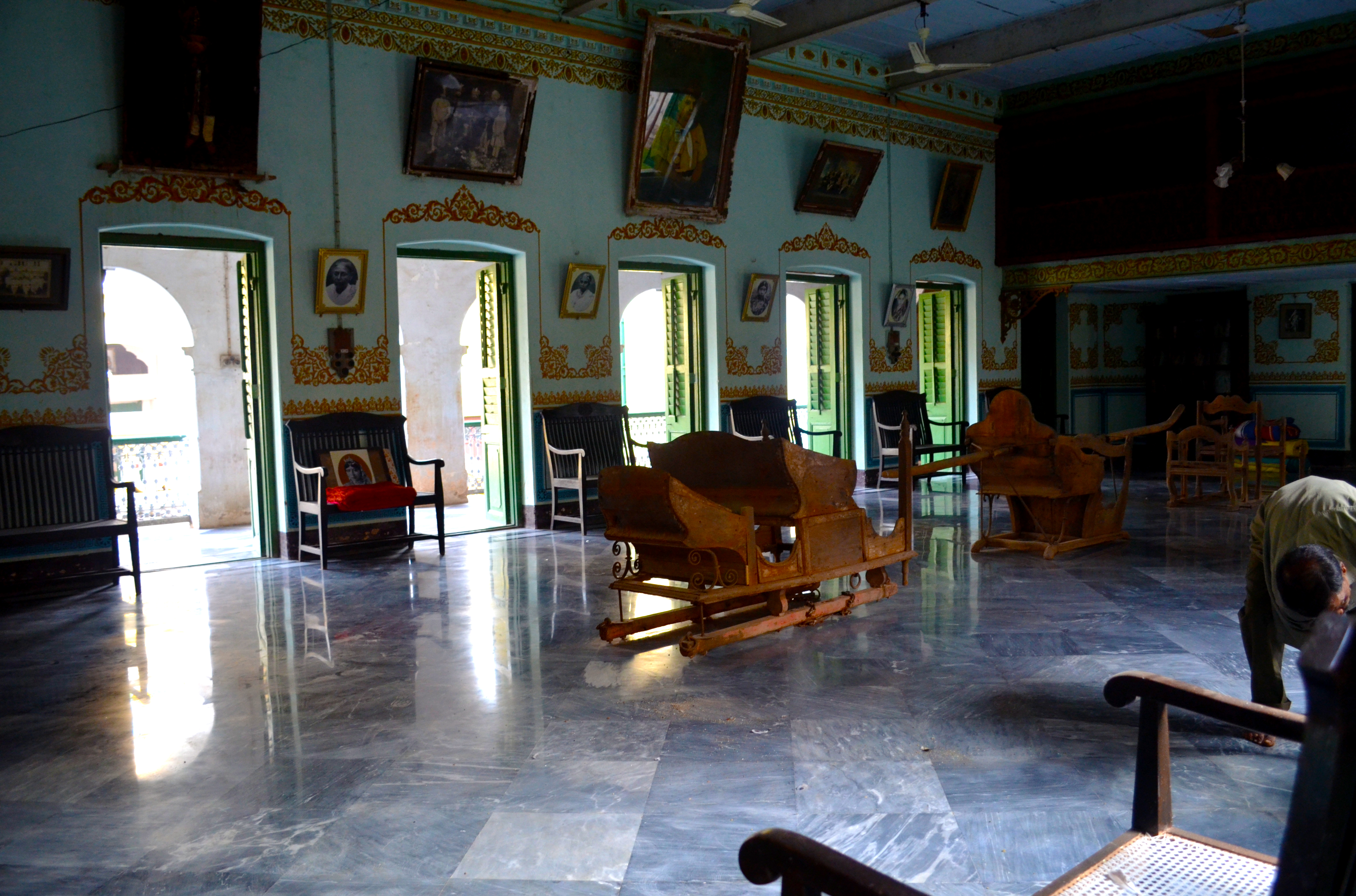
Interior of Dhenkanal palace

== See also ==
- Dhenkanal State
