= Udayagiri, Odisha =

Buddhist complex in Odisha, India

Udayagiri
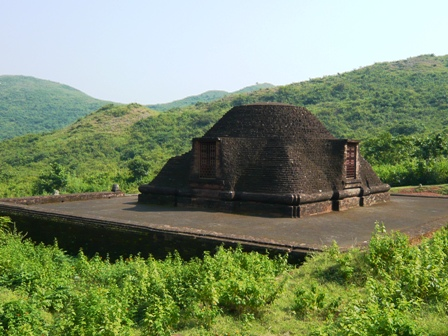
- Main Stupa

- Location within India Location within Odisha

Religion
- Affiliation: Buddhism
- Status: Preserved

Location
- Location: India
- State: Odisha
- Interactive map of Udayagiri
- Coordinates: 20.6416°N 86.2692°E

Udayagiri (Odia: ଉଦୟଗିରି) is the largest Buddhist complex in the Indian state of Odisha. It is composed of major stupas and monasteries (viharas). Together with the nearby complexes of Lalitgiri and Ratnagiri, it is part of the "Diamond Triangle" of the "Ratnagiri-Udayagiri-Lalitgiri" complex. It used to be thought that one or all of these were the Pushpagiri Vihara known from ancient records, but this has now been convincingly located at a different site. Per epigraphical artifacts found at the site, Udayagiri's historical name was "Madhavapura Mahavihara." This Buddhist complex, preceded by the Ratnagiri and Lalitgiri sites, with their monasteries, is believed to have been active between the 7th and the 12th centuries.

== Location ==
Udayagiri is situated in the foothills, 90 kilometres (56 mi) to the north-east from Bhubaneswar, and 70 kilometres (43 mi) north-east of Cuttack in Jajpur district. As the crow flies, Ratnagiri and Udaygiri are about 11 km apart, and both about 7 km from Lalitgiri. The site now recognised as Puspagiri is some 18 km distant from Udaygiri, the nearest of the "triangle" sites.

== Findings ==
Numerous excavations by the Archaeological Survey of India (ASI) have been conducted at Udayagiri since 1958. The Udayagiri Site 1, the first site to be excavated, is in a depression between two valleys. In the excavations done between 1985–86 and 1989–90 at the Udayagiri Site 2, the antiquities exposed consisted of a Buddhist Monastic complex enclosed within a compound wall, including a stupa of 7 metres (23 ft) height with four images of dhyani Buddhas fixed at its four cardinal points. On the basis of the epigraphical evidence, archaeologist have inferred that this site is "Madhavapura Mahavihara". During the large excavation from 1997 to 2000, a second part of Udayagiri-2 was discovered with additional stupas and monasteries. These antiquities consist of two eighth century monastic complexes, statues of Buddha, Tara, Manjusri, Avalokiteśvara, Jatamukuta Lokesvara and many terracotta (earthenware) seals. A stepped stone well with epigraphic inscriptions has also been discovered. Also seen near one of the entry gates at the site is a human figure swinging on a rope, with eyes closed, in a state of perfect happiness.

During the recent investigations conducted between 2001 and 2004 the antiquities unearthed included a stone finish flooring in the foreground of the excavated monastery, the main drain of the monastery flowing out to the north, a large stone raised platform 14.05 by 13.35 metres (46.1 ft × 43.8 ft) in size built in seven layers with ashlar masonry accessed through a series of steps, and marked in its northern end by a chandrashila (moon rock). Also found were apsidal chaitya-grihas (an old one replaced by another built in brick) facing east with a stupa deified in it, built with stone and bricks, founded on the raised platform, and remnants of stone jali embellished with the theme of a three-hooked snake inferred as gavakshas (horse-shoe arches).

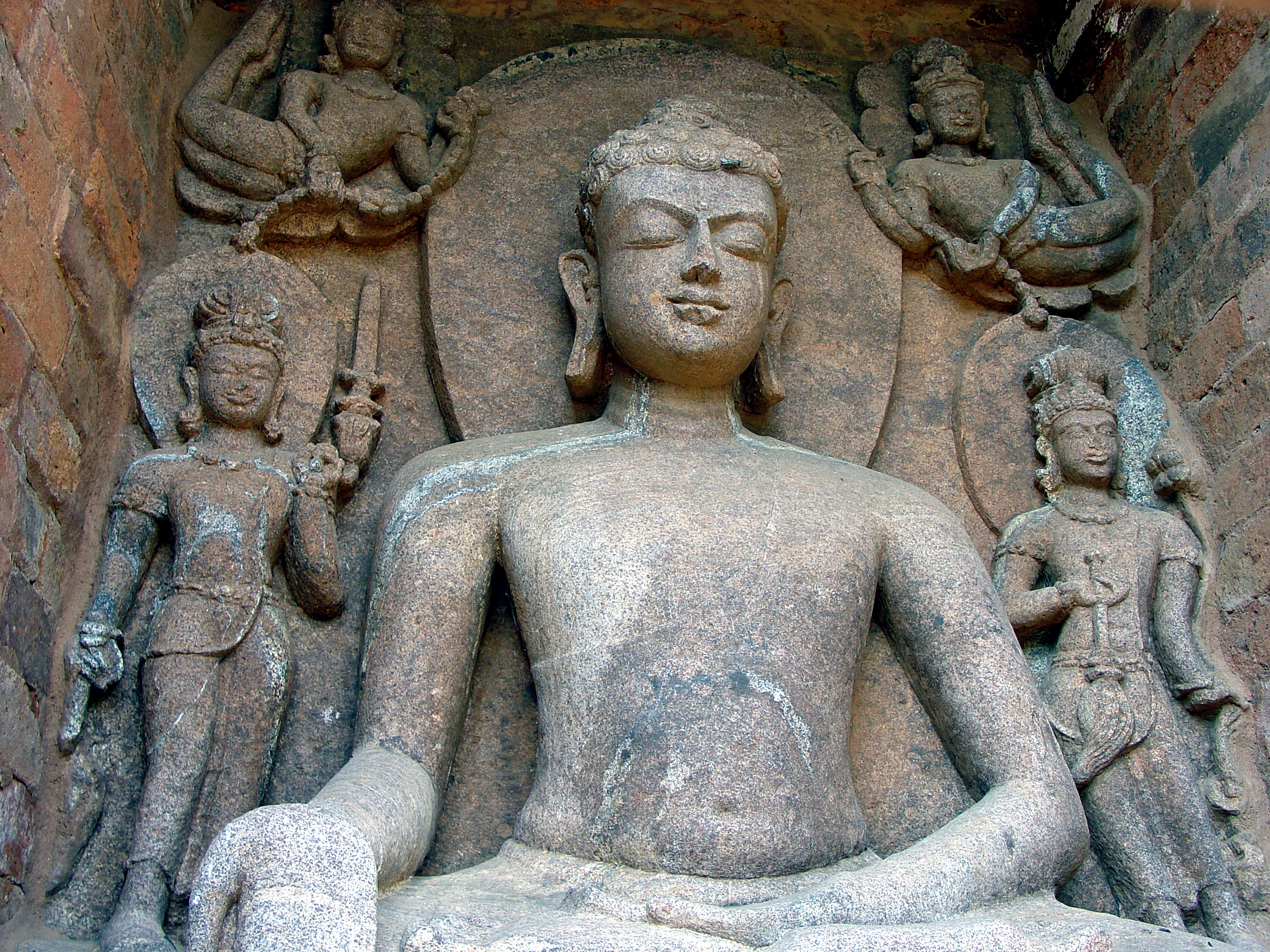
Buddha, flanked by Manjusri (left), holding an upraised sword (his attribute) and a chauri, partially broken off. To the right is Avalokiteshvara, holding a lotus and chauri.

Images of Tara in the form of Tara Kurukulla or Kurukulla Tara have been reported from Udayagiri and also from Lalitgiri and Ratnagiri; these are an emanation form of Amitābha seated in a lalitasana posture. Images of Hariti have been found in Udayagiri and also in Lalitgiri and Ratnagiri. This image portrays the goodess in a seated position breast feeding a child or with the child seated on its lap. Hariti was once a child abductor, but Buddha persuaded her to become the protector of children.

Also seen in the western, southern and northern parts of the chaitya-griha are remnants of a number of stupas in three groups, built in stone with only their plain plinths seen in a preserved state. An important discovery in the precincts of the chaitya-griha, is of statues of Avalokiteswara, Tathāgata, Bhikruti-Tara and Chunda embedded in niches, marking the four cardinal points. Other findings are of 14 stupas (built in brick with mud mortar) dated between the 1st and 12th centuries, and also many 5th- to 13th-century epigraphs. Votive stupas, made of stone, are also seen along a stone paved path. At the eastern part of the chaitya-griha are residential houses consisting of six rooms with artifacts of domestic goods. Though located only 5 kilometres (3.1 mi) away from Ratnagiri, the site has not revealed any artifacts which could provide a link to the Vajrayana tantric cult found at Ratnagiri.

== Gallery ==
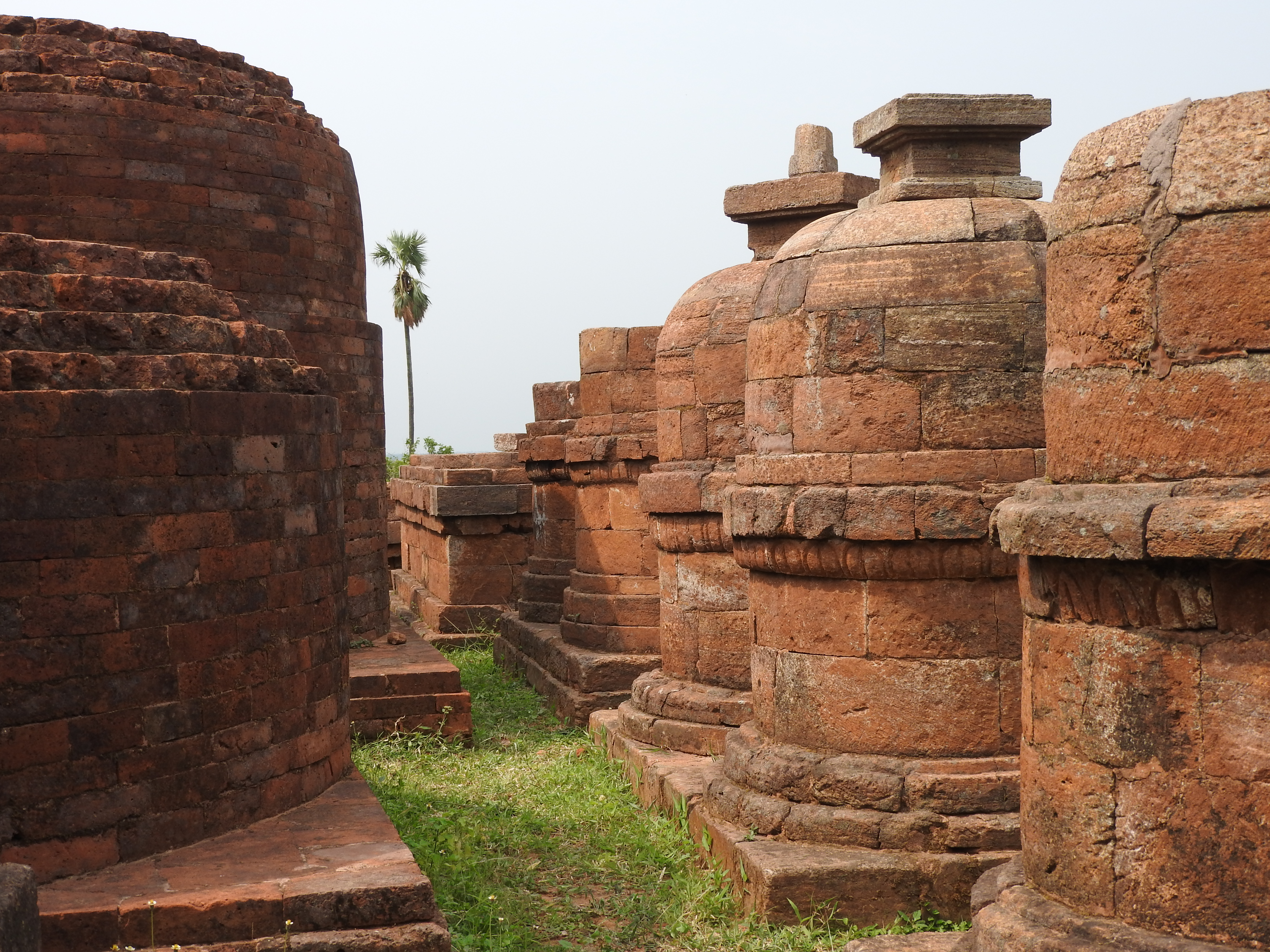
Stupas of Udayagiri Buddhist complex, Odisha

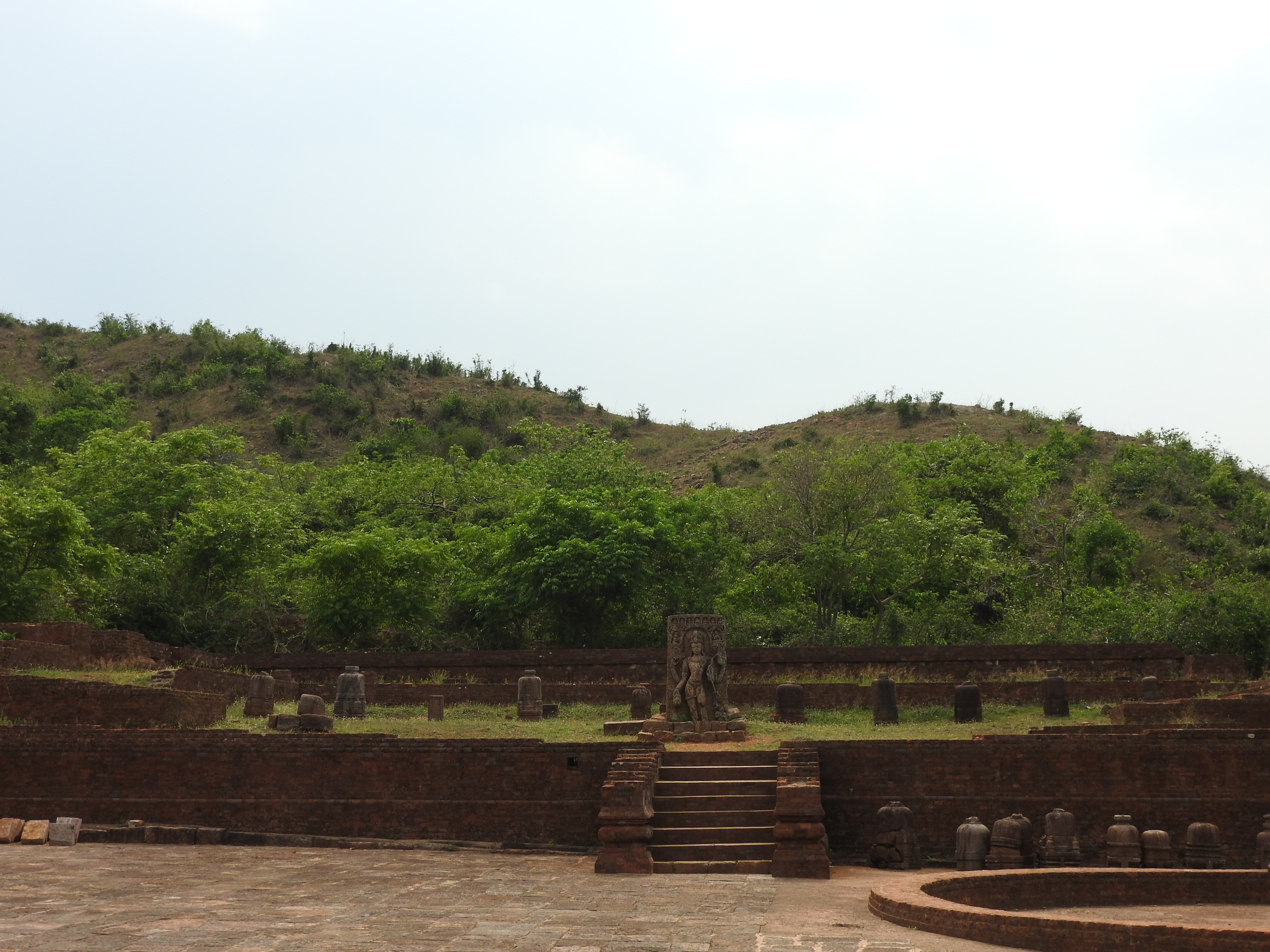

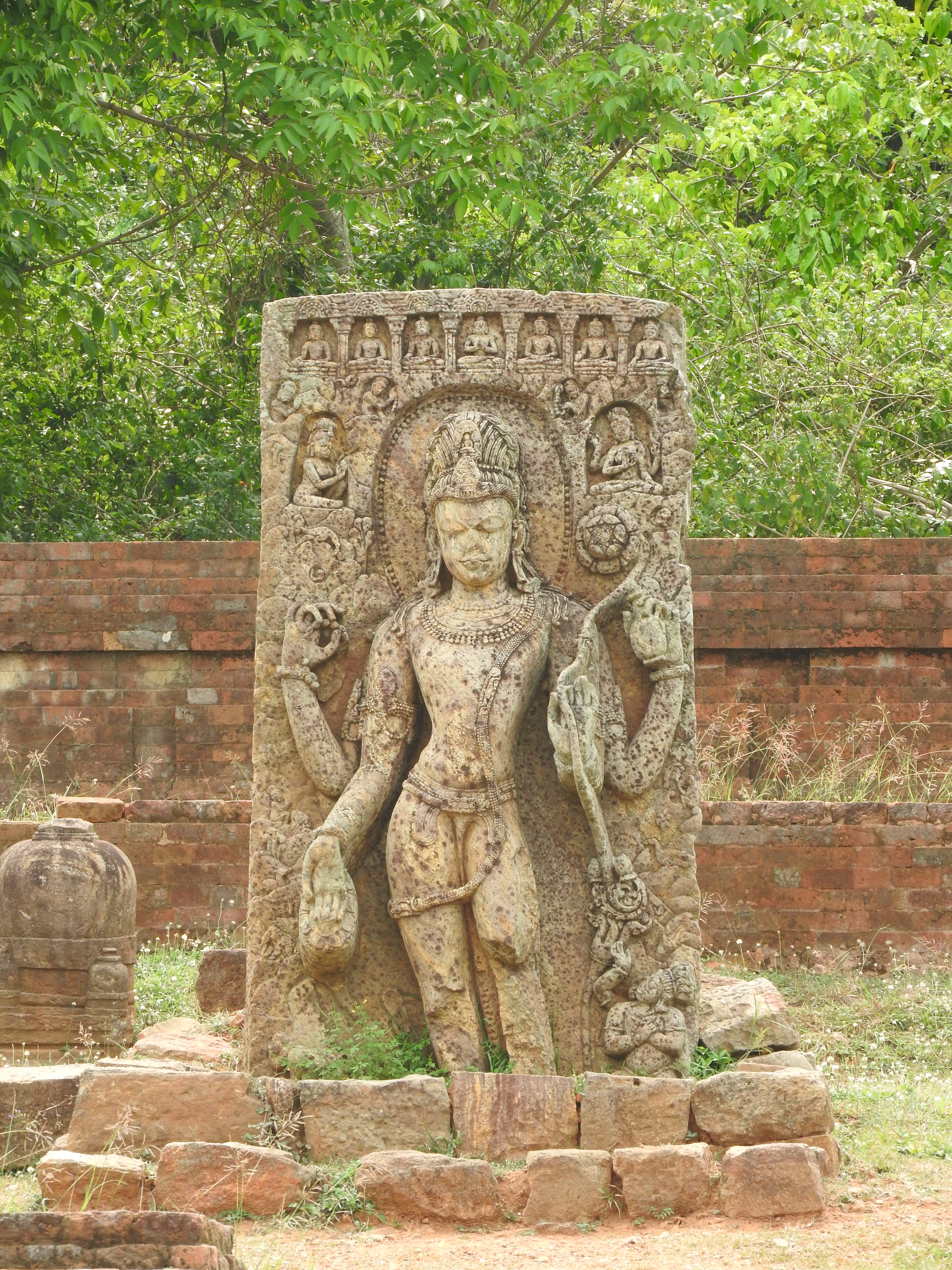

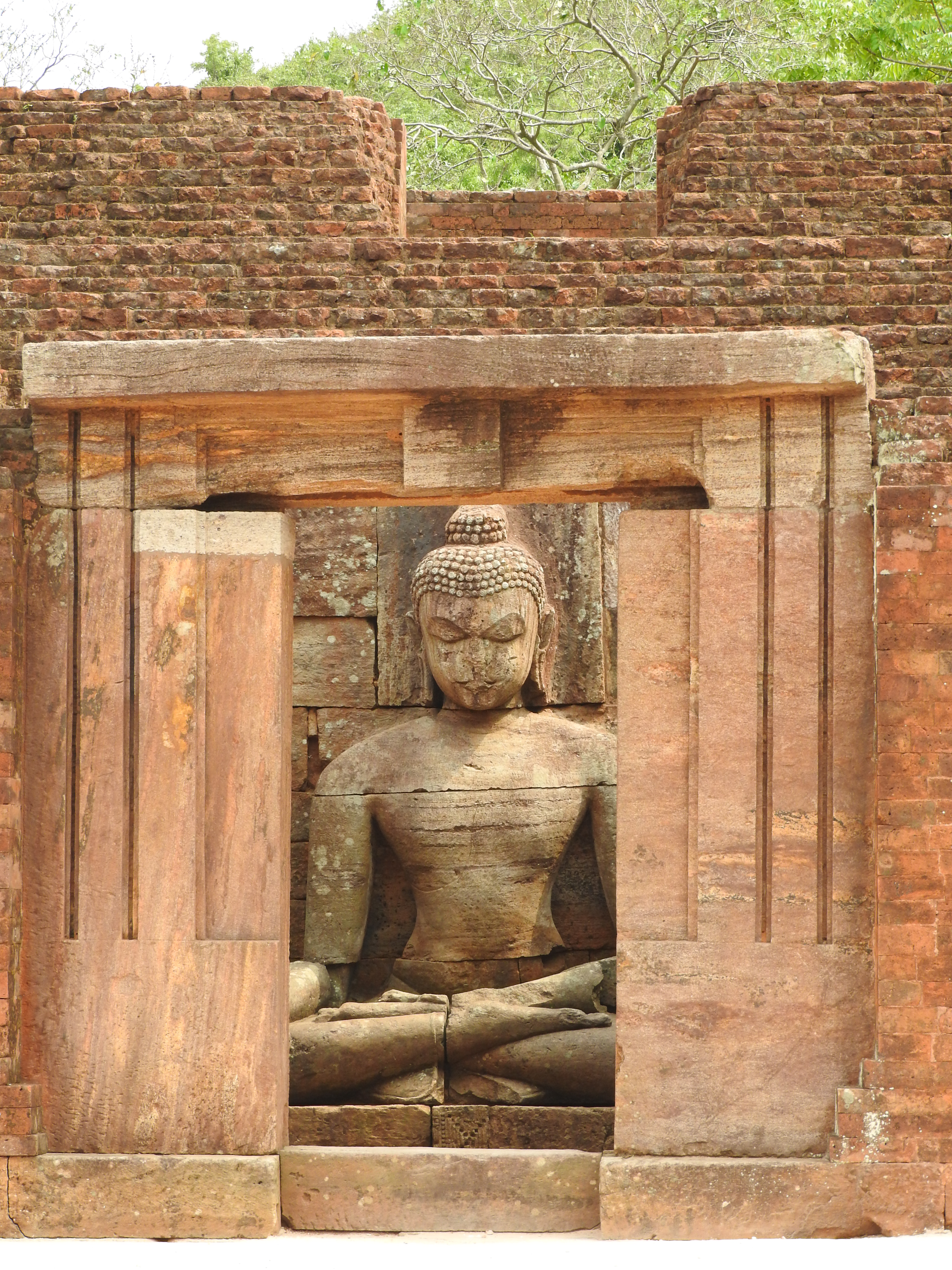

== Bibliography ==
- Hoiberg, Dale; Ramchandani, Indu (2000). Students' Britannica India. Popular Prakashan. ISBN 978-0-85229-760-5.
- Session, Indian Art History Congress (2000). Proceedings of Indian Art History Congress. Indian Art History Congress.
