= Lalitagiri =

Buddhist complex in the Indian state of Odisha

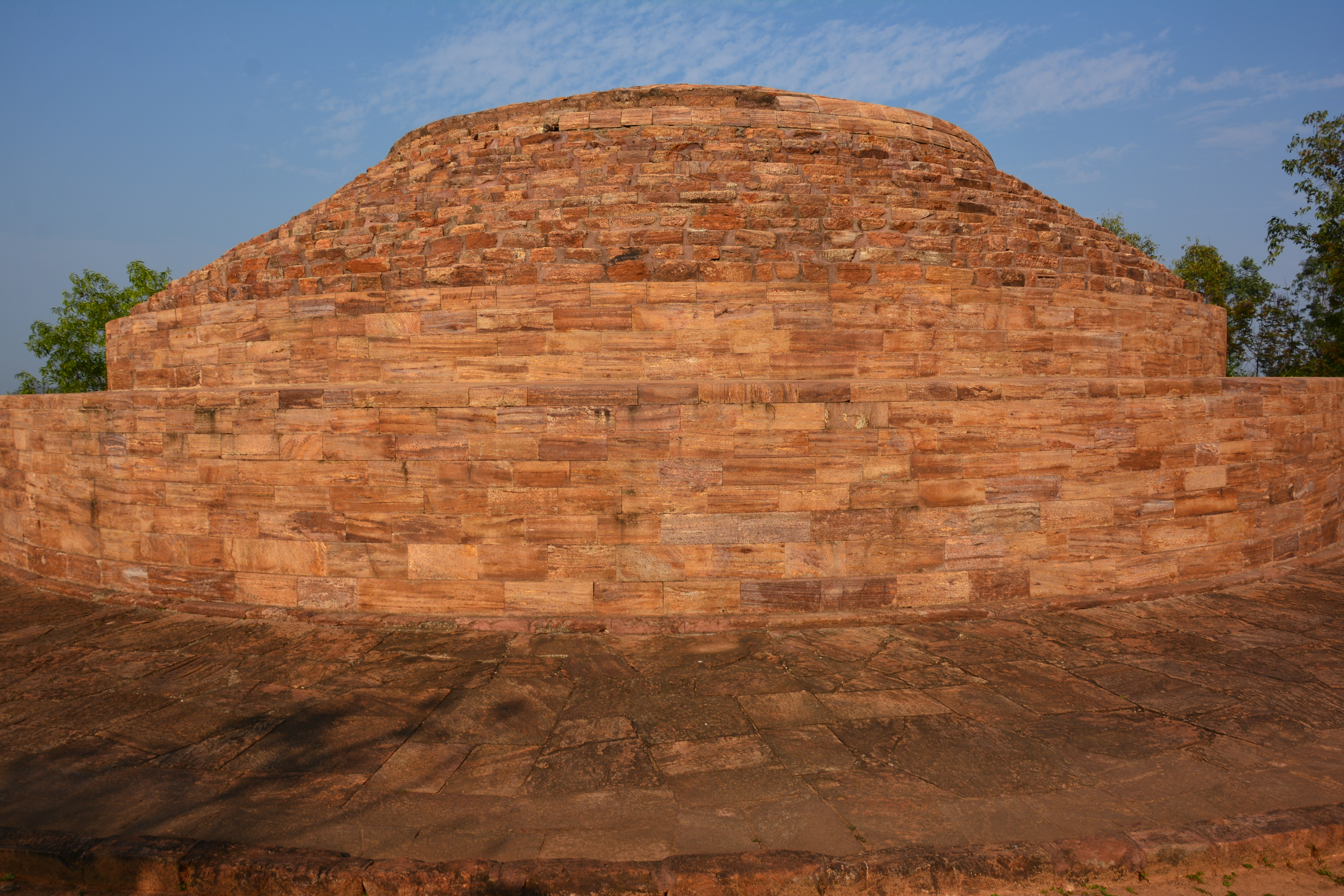
- Lalitagiri Mahastupa

- Location within India

Religion
- Affiliation: Buddhism
- Region: Coastal
- Status: Preserved

Location
- Location: India
- State: Odisha
- Interactive map of Lalitagiri
- Coordinates: 20.5894°N 86.2506°E

Lalitagiri (Odia: ଲଳିତଗିରି) (also known as Nalitagiri) is a major Buddhist complex in the Cuttack district in the Indian state of Odisha. The complex is home to stupas, 'esoteric' Buddha images, and monasteries (viharas), which is the oldest site in the region. Significant finds at this complex include Buddha's relics. Tantric Buddhism was practiced at this site.

Together with the Ratnagiri and Udayagiri sites a short distance away, Lalitagiri is part of the "Diamond Triangle" of Buddhist sites. It used to be thought that one or all of these were the large Pushpagiri Vihara known from ancient records, but this has now convincingly located at a different site.

== Location ==
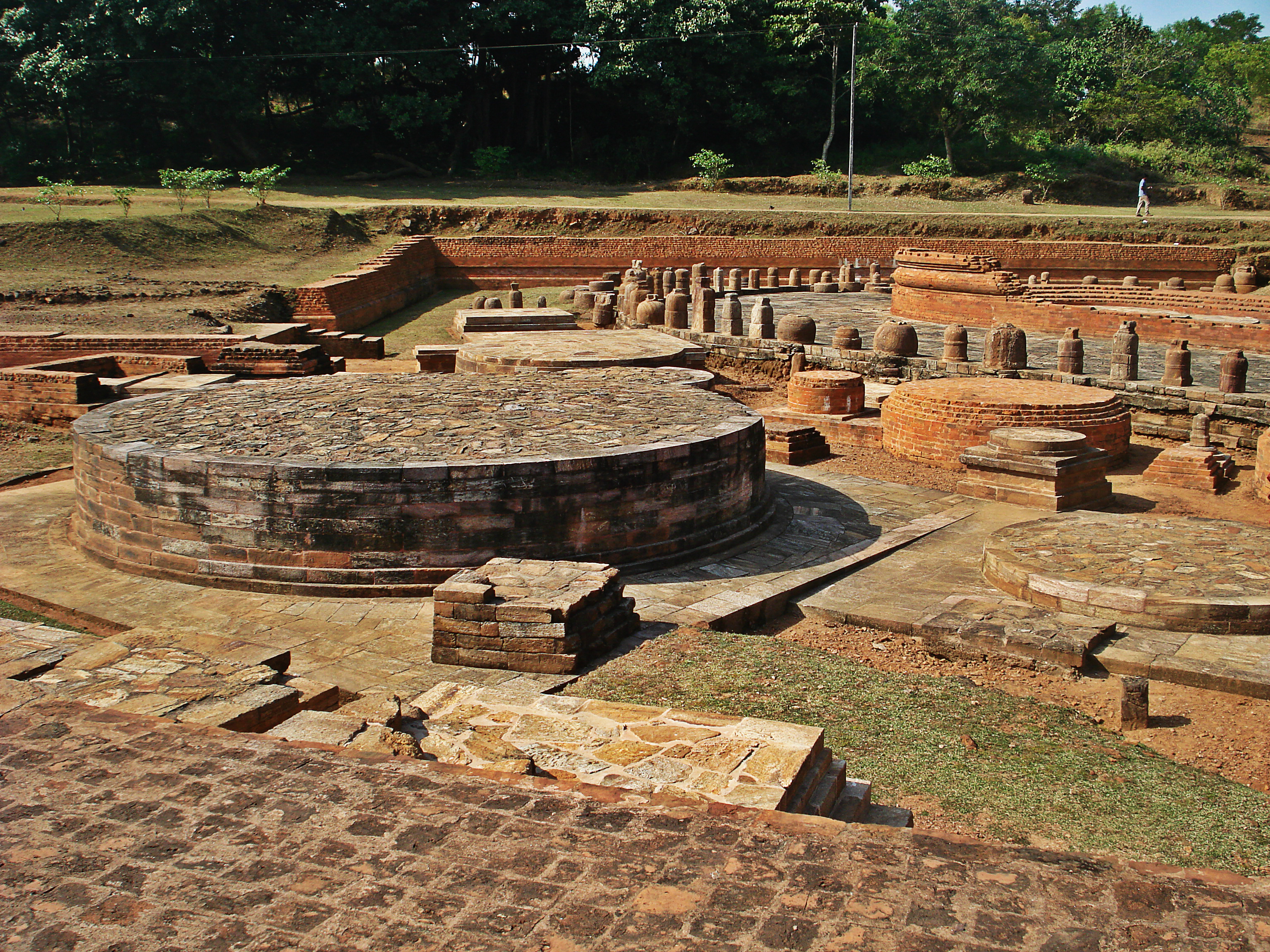
Full view of the chaityagriha stupa complex in Lalitagiri

Lalitagiri is a major center of Buddhism hemmed between the Parabhadi and Landa sandstone hills in the standalone Assian hill range. It is situated in the Mahanga Tahsil in Cuttack district. Bhubaneswar, the state capital of Odisha, is 90 kilometres (56 mi) from the site, while Cuttack, the former state capital is 60 kilometres (37 mi) away; Udaigiri is 8 kilometres (5.0 mi) from Lalitagiri and Ratnagiri is 12 kilometres (7.5 mi) away. Cuttack is well connected by road, rail and air services with the rest of the country.

== History ==
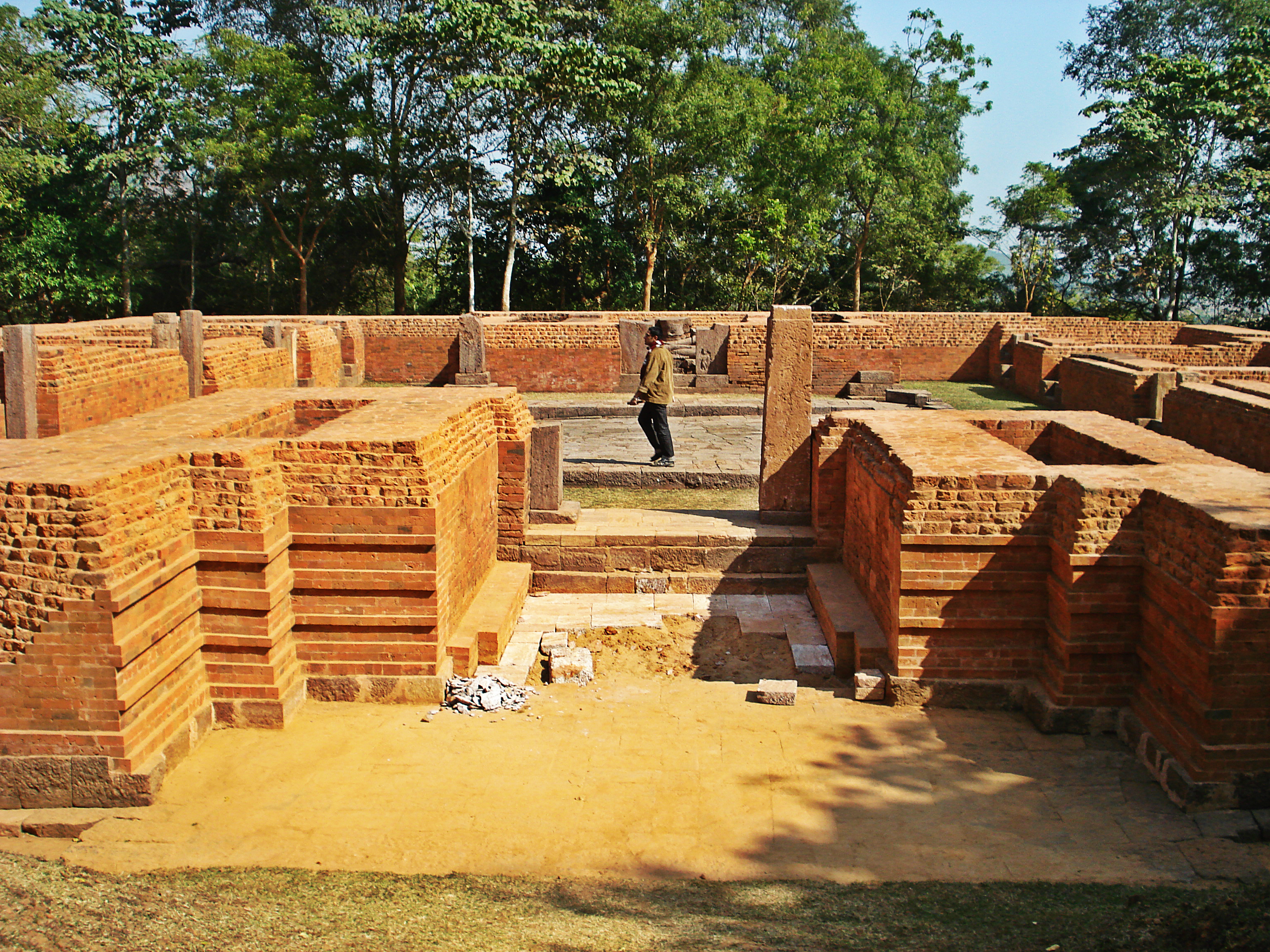
Lalitagiri Ruins

The first identification of archaeological antiquities from the Diamond Triangle sites was conducted in 1905 by M.M. Chakravarty, the then Sub Divisional Officer in Jajpur. Later, in 1927 and 1928, R.P. Chanda of the Indian Museum in Kolkata documented the site in the Memoirs of Archaeological Survey of India (ASI). In 1937, the site was officially declared a protected monument by the central government. In 1977, some excavations were done at the site by the Utkal University. Detailed excavations by the Bhubaneswar Circle of the Archaeological Survey of India were conducted between 1985 and 1991. From these investigations, it has been inferred that Lalitagiri, one of the earliest Buddhist sites in Orissa, maintained a continuous cultural sequence starting from the post Mauryan period (322–185 BC) till 13th century AD. It is also inferred that this site maintained a continuous presence of Buddhism, unbroken, from 3rd century BC to 10th century AD.

In 1985, the Archaeological Survey of India (ASI) started excavation at Lalitagiri to locate Pushpagiri, an important Buddhist site mentioned in the writings of the 7th-century Chinese traveler Xuanzang. The excavation led to several important archaeological discoveries, but none that identified Lalitagiri with Pushpagiri. Later, excavations at Langudi Hill suggested that Pushpagiri was located there.

== Archaeological finds ==
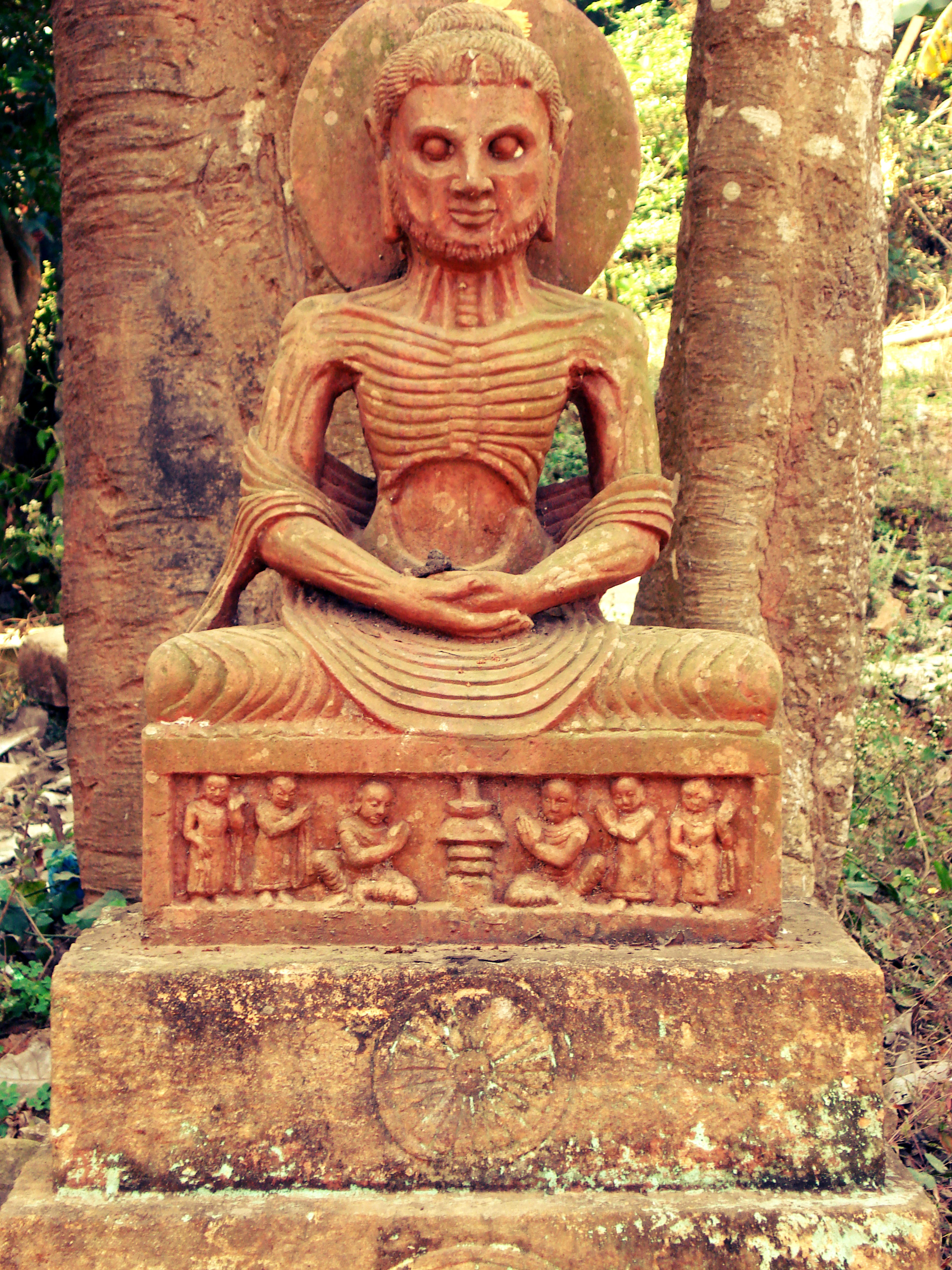
Sculpture of the fasting Buddha

The excavations carried out by the ASI at Lalitagiri have unearthed remnants of a large stupa on the hill. Within the stupa, two rare stone caskets were found with relics of Buddha; this was the first such find in Eastern India. The stone caskets, like Chinese Puzzle boxes, made of Khondalite stone, revealed three other boxes within them, made of steatite, silver and gold respectively; the gold casket, which is the last one, contained a relic or dhatu in the form of a small piece of bone.

Another interesting find is that of an east facing apsidal chaityagriha, built of bricks, 33 by 11 metres (108 ft × 36 ft) in size with 3.3 metres (11 ft)-thick walls. This edifice, the first such Buddhist structure found in Odisha, contains a circular stupa at its center. Also found were a series of Kushana Brahmi inscriptions made on shells with cuts on moonstone at the periphery of the edifice. Another find is a piece of a pillar railing with a lens-shaped decoration with the theme of a half lotus medallion. From these finds it is inferred that such structures belonged from the early Christian era to 6th–7th century period.

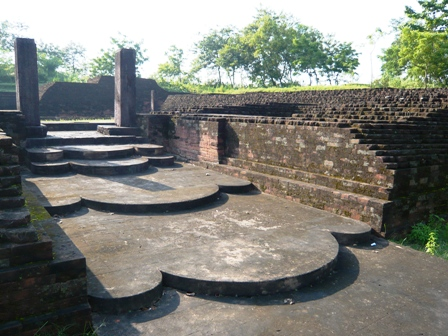
Entrance to one of the monasteries

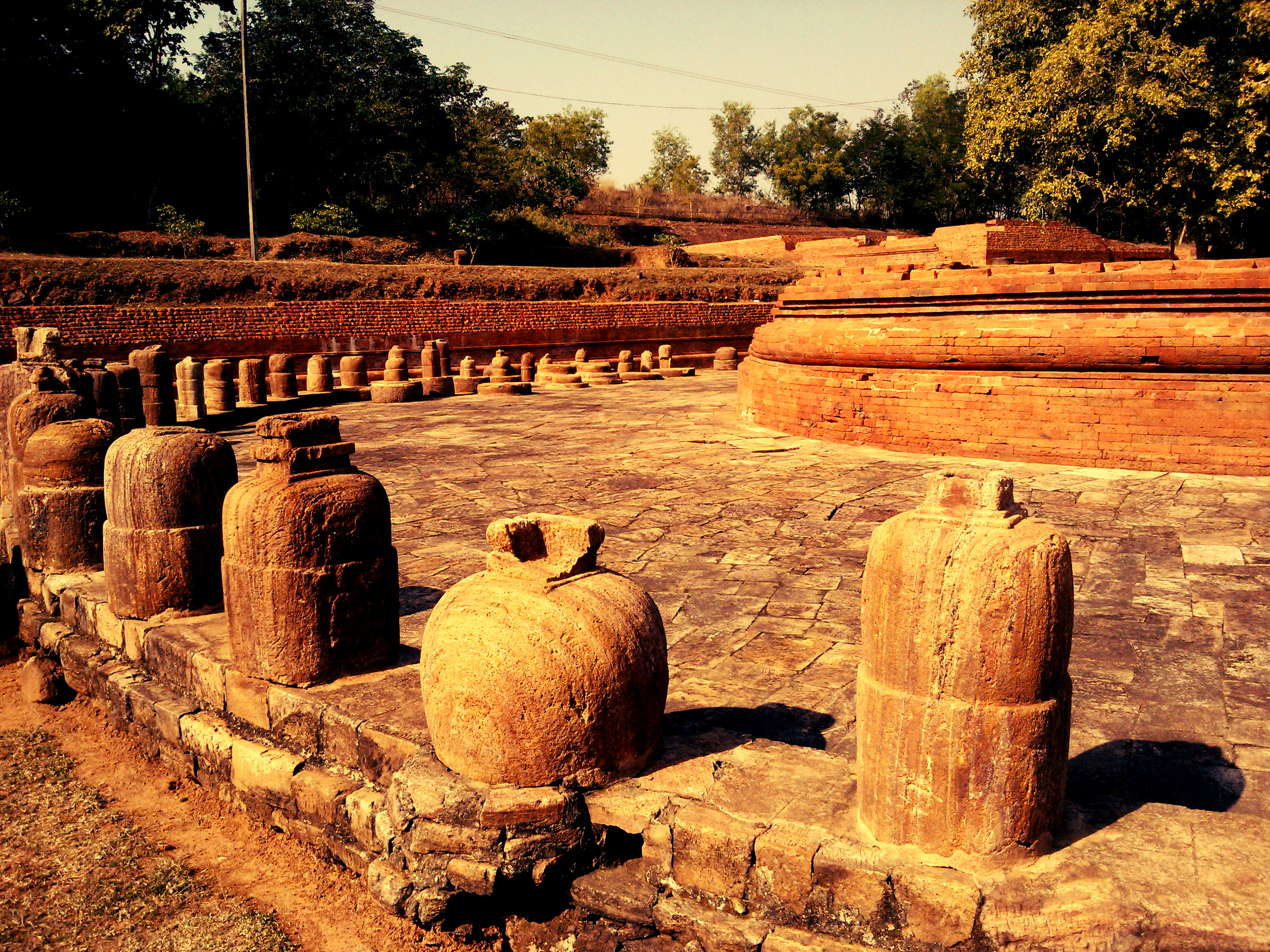
Lalitagiri Central structure

Also found were remnants of four monasteries. The first and the largest monastery, facing east, a two storied structure measuring 36 square metres (390 sq ft), has at its center a 12.9 metres (42 ft) square open space; it is dated to 10th–11th century AD. Adjoining the monastery at the rear end is a rainwater cistern built of bricks. The second monastery, in the northern extremity of the hill, is believed to have been built when Buddhism was losing its importance in Lalitagiri. The third monastery faces south-east and has dimensions of 28 by 27 metres (92 ft × 89 ft) with a central open space of 8 square metres (86 sq ft) and represents the end stages of apsidal chaitya. The fourth monastery, 30 square metres (320 sq ft), in size, has many large sized Buddha heads deified in the sanctum sanctorum. A terracotta monastic seal with the inscription "Sri Chandraditya Vihara Samagra Arya Vikshu Sanghasa" is dated to the 9th–10th century AD.

The antiquities unearthed include a plethora of images of Buddha in different meditative forms from the Mahayana Buddhism period. The finds also include a gold pendant, silver jewellery, stone tablets with imprints of Ganesha and Mahisasurmardini, a seal matrix-cum-pendant, and a small image of Avalokiteśvara.

Images of Tara in the form of Tara Kurukulla or Kurukulla Tara have been reported in Lalitagiri and also from Udayagiri and Ratnagiri, including an emanation form of Amitabha seated in a lalitasana posture. Images of Hariti have also been found in Lalitagiri and also in Udayagiri and Ratnagiri. These images portray the goddess in a seated position, breast feeding a child or with the child seated in its lap. Hariti was once a child abductor, but Buddha persuaded her to become the protector of children.

Also found are potsherds with inscriptions dated from the post Mauryan period to 8th–9th century AD, which indicate that Buddhists belonging to the Hinayana and Mahayana sects lived here. The last period of occupation is identified as belonging to Vajrayana, the Tantric period of Buddhism during the reign of Bhauma-Kara dynasty (8th–10th century AD).

== Museum ==
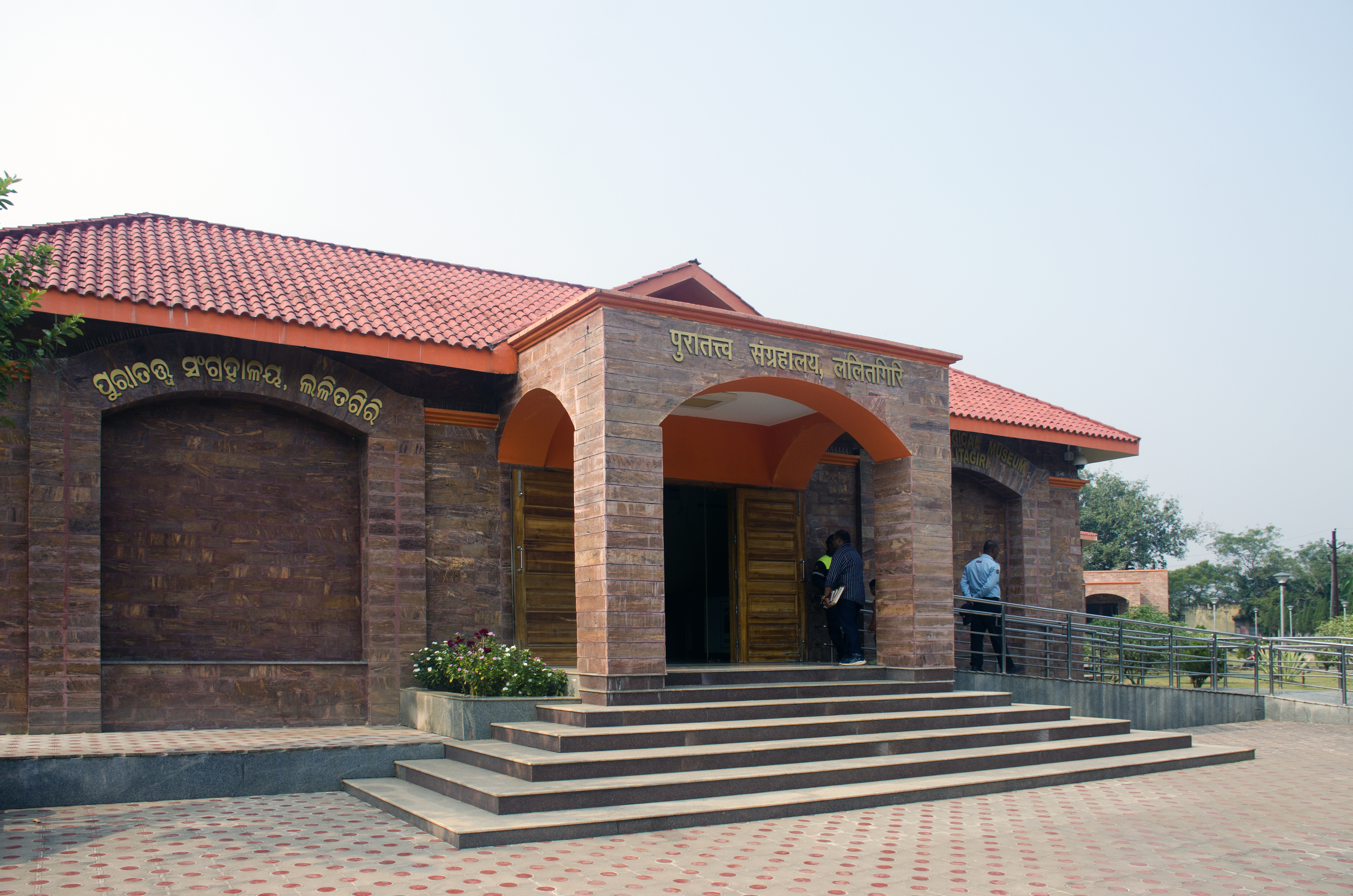
Lalaitgiri Site Museum (New)

Initially, a makeshift enclosure housed the sculptures unearthed from the site for display. Now the permanent museum established houses sculptures of Buddha from the Mahayana period. The huge stone statues, with inscriptions on some of them, are of Buddha, Boddhisattva, Tara, Jambhala and many others. The statues of Buddha, portrayed in a standing position and attired with a drape adorned from shoulder level to the knee, is reflective of the Gandhara and Mathura schools of sculpture. The relic caskets recovered from the stone stupa on the hill are also on display.

== Bibliography ==
- Biswas, Subhash C (29 September 2014). India the Land of Gods. PartridgeIndia. ISBN 978-1-4828-3655-4.
- Goldberg, Kory; Decary, Michelle (26 June 2012). Along the Path: The Meditator's Companion to the Buddha's Land. Pariyatti. ISBN 978-1-928706-56-4.
- Hoiberg, Dale; Ramchandani, Indu (2000). Students' Britannica India. Popular Prakashan. ISBN 978-0-85229-760-5.
- Session, Indian Art History Congress (2000). Proceedings of Indian Art History Congress. Indian Art History Congress.
- Sinha, Chitta Ranjan Prasad; Das, Harish Chandra (1996). Proceedings of the Indian Art History Congress, 4th Session, Patna – 1996. Indian Art History Congress.
