= Jaraka =

Jaraka ଜାରକା
- Town
- Location of Jaraka on Map of Odisha Jaraka (India)
- Coordinates: 20°46′1.055″N 86°9′10.287″E
- Country: India
- State: Odisha
- District: Jajpur

Languages
  - Official: Odia
- Time zone: UTC+5:30 (IST)
- PIN: 755050
- Vehicle registration: OD-04
- Climate: Aw (Köppen)
- Website: https://www.jajpur.nic.in/

Jaraka is a town in Dharmasala Block of Jajpur district in Odisha, India. Located on the banks of Brahmani River, it is one of the fastest-growing areas in the district.

== Geography ==
It is located on the banks of River Brahmani and is split into two parts by National Highway 16.

The Western part mainly consists of Bada Bazaar, Hanuman Market, College Road, Telephone Exchange Road, Stadium Road, IDCO Industrial Estate and several Residential areas. There are a number of colonies here, the major ones are Kumari Colony, Surya Vihar Colony (Jamubania) and Pandua. It also has the Block Headquarters Office, Treasury and several Govt. Offices.

The Eastern Part consists of mainly Market areas namely Main Market, Bus Stand, Cuttack Road, Gopabandhu Chhak and Shanti Baazar.

To the north of the town, Deuli Hill is located on the banks of the Brahmani River. Tourism has increased, with new cafes and the hilltops serving as primary attractions. Located in the Jajpur district, the town features natural scenery and various points of interest.

== Population ==
The Population of the town is around 10,000.

== Education ==
=== Literacy ===
The town has a literacy rate of 87.28%, Males having 92.04% and females having 81.74%.

Literacy in Jaraka
Literacy	Percent
Male	92.04%
Female	81.74%
All	87.28%

=== Educational institutions ===
The town has several Schools and Colleges namely –

- Dharmasala public school
- Jaraka High School
- Jaraka UP School
- Jaraka Primary School
- Dharmasala Mahavidyalaya
- Venkateswar School
- Vivekananda Shiksha Kendra
- Vivekananda Shiksha Niketan
- Renaissance Higher Secondary School
- Gokarnika Higher Secondary School
- Dharmasala Women's College
- Children's paradise public school

== Tourist Attractions ==
=== Gokarneswar Temple ===
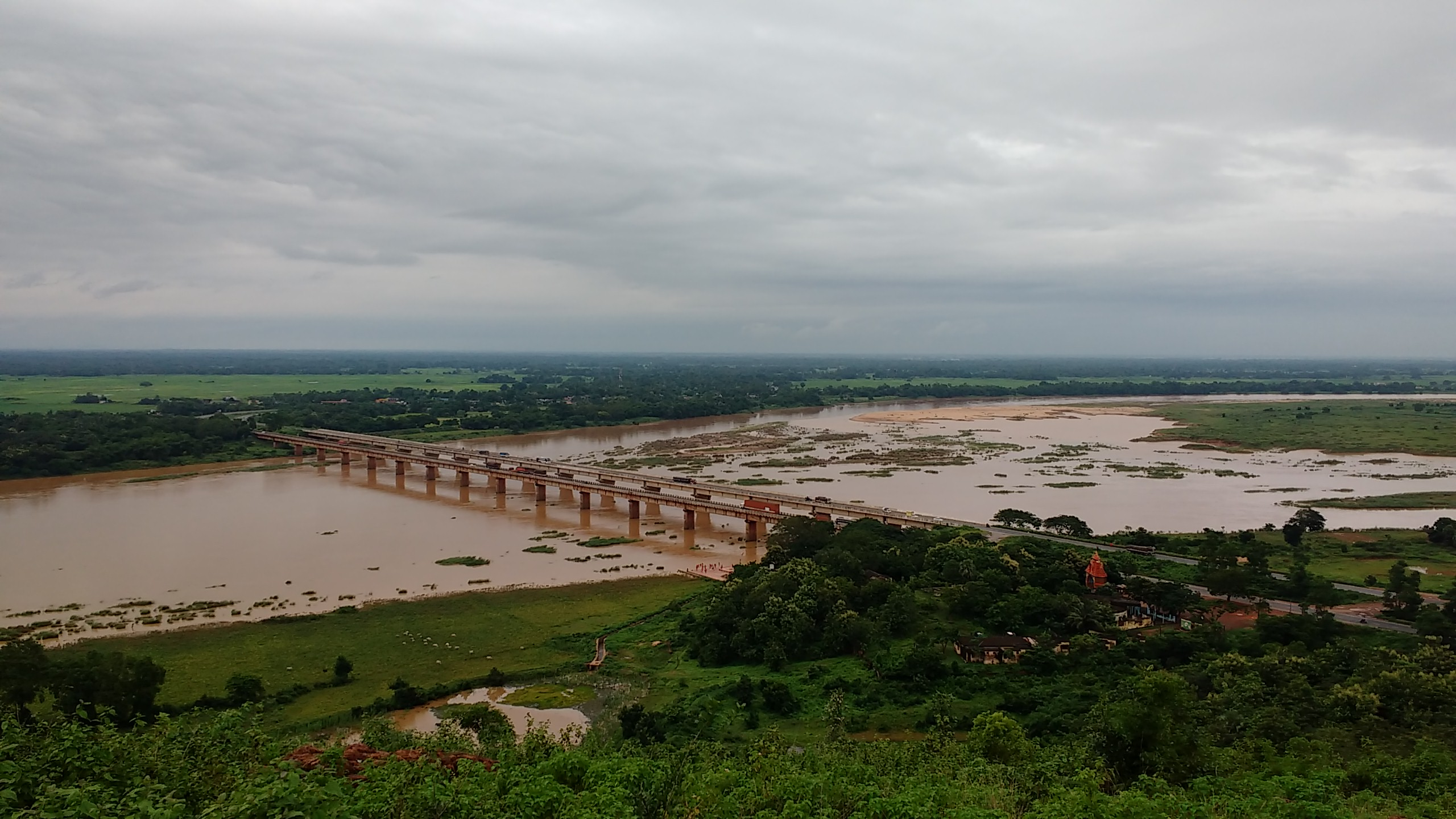
View from the Deulipal hill to the Brahmani river and the bridge of the NH 16 across

Gokarneswar Temple is a temple dedicated to Lord Shiva which is present on the banks of river Brahmani adjacent to NH-16 and Bramhani Bridge.

=== Pushpagiri Vihara (Langudi Hill) ===
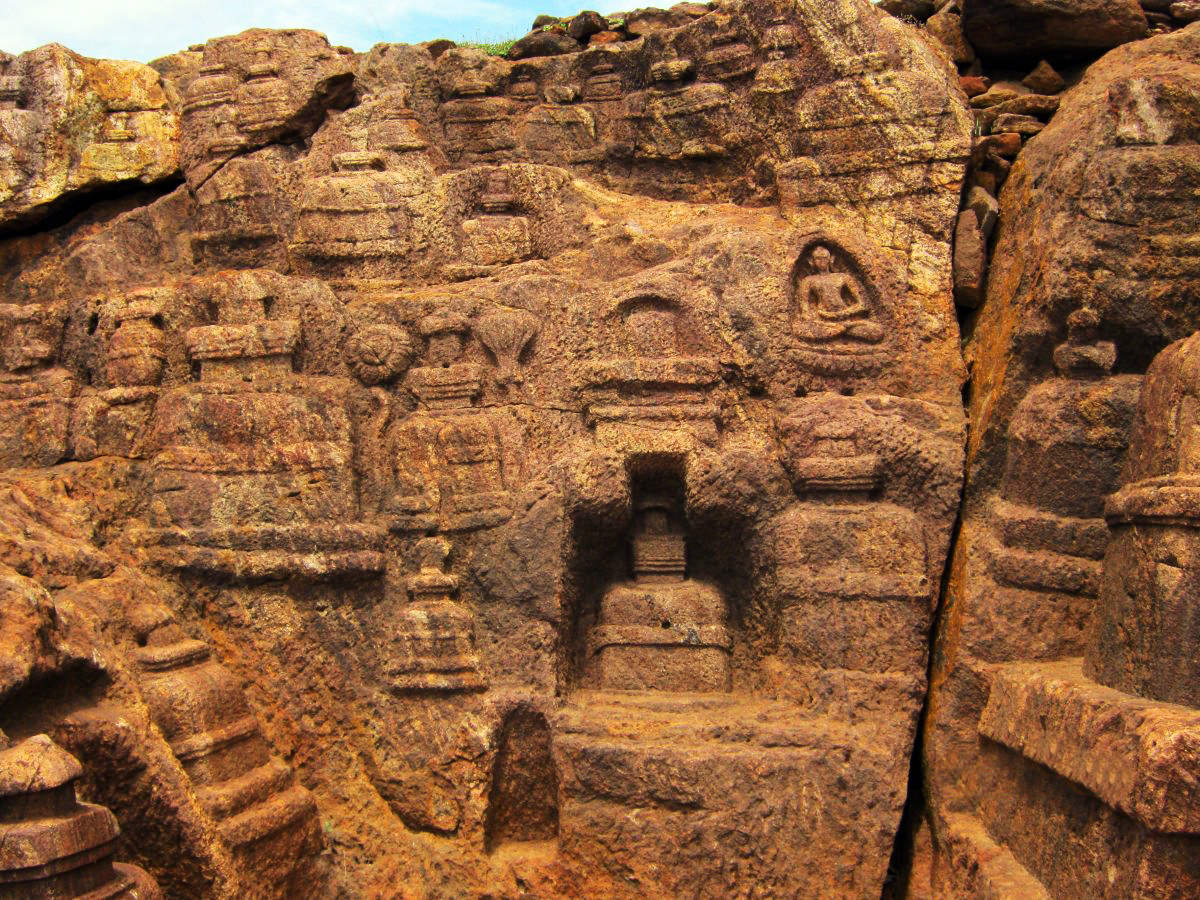
Pushpagiri Vihara (Langudi Hill)

Langudi Hill is another Buddhist Site known for its monastic complex called Pushpagiri Vihara. These sites contain ruins of many buildings, stupas of various sizes, sculptures and many other artefacts related to Buddhism.

=== Deuli Hill and view point ===
The Deuli Hill was discovered as an archeological site with ancient Buddhist remains and is now a tourist attraction. A new viewpoint tower has been built recently at the sunset view spot to maximise the views of the town and the banking river Bramhani.

== Industry ==
The town also has many small and medium scale industries at IDCO Industrial Estate. The only Large Scale industrial facility present in the area is Ramco Cement Manufacturing Plant located at Haridaspur.

== Notable people ==
- Kalpataru Das
- Debi Prasanna Dash
- Bira Kishore Dash
- Tushar Parida
