= Kotapur =

Village in Odisha, India

Coordinates: 20.845182°N 86.553169°E

Kotapur is a village in the Jajpur district of India.
