= List of Monuments of National Importance in Tiruchirapalli circle =

This is a list of Monuments of National Importance (ASI) as officially recognized by and available through the website of the Archaeological Survey of India in the Indian state Tamil Nadu. 162 Monuments of National Importance have been recognized by the ASI in Trichy circle of Tamil Nadu.

== List of monuments ==
SL. No.	Description	Location	Address	District	Coordinates	Image
N-TN-T1	Brihadisvara Temple	Jayankonda Cholapuram		Ariyalur	11°12′23″N 79°26′56″E	Brihadisvara Temple More images
N-TN-T2	Jain Statue Built Of Granite ( Moved to museum )	Jayankonda Cholapuram		Ariyalur		Upload Photo
N-TN-T3	Jain Statue Called Paluppar	Jayankonda Cholapuram		Ariyalur	11°12′32″N 79°21′54″E	Jain Statue Called Paluppar More images
N-TN-T4	Mandapakkadu (Structure With Mound)	Chettipalayam		Coimbatore	10°56′54″N 77°03′04″E	Mandapakkadu (Structure With Mound) More images
N-TN-T5	Fort on Rock	Dindigul		Dindigul	10°21′38″N 77°57′47″E	Fort on Rock More images
N-TN-T6	Dolmens Near Palamalai	Adukkam		Dindigul	10°12′32″N 77°33′03″E	Upload Photo
N-TN-T7	Cave In Sitharmalai	Mettupatti		Dindigul	10°04′28″N 77°50′44″E	Upload Photo
N-TN-T8	Dolmens Near Machur Reserved Forest	Panaikkadu		Dindigul	10°16′22″N 77°36′24″E	Upload Photo
N-TN-T9	Dolmens Near Machur	Panaikkadu		Dindigul	10°16′11″N 77°32′27″E	Upload Photo
N-TN-T10	Dolmens Near Talayar River On Top Of The Hill	Panaikkadu		Dindigul	10°16′02″N 77°30′04″E	Upload Photo
N-TN-T11	Dolmens	Vilpatti		Dindigul	10°17′15″N 77°37′45″E	Upload Photo
N-TN-T12	Rock-amidst Sea where Swami Vivekananda meditated	Kanyakumari		Kanyakumari	8°04′41″N 77°33′20″E	Rock-amidst Sea where Swami Vivekananda meditated More images
N-TN-T13	Rock cut Cave temple Rock-cut cave temple together with adjacent land in survey plot nos. 2632/8, 2632/9 and 2632/10	Thirunanthikarai		Kanyakumari	8°23′55″N 77°17′52″E	Rock cut Cave temple Rock-cut cave temple together with adjacent land in survey plot nos. 2632/8, 2632/9 and 2632/10 More images
N-TN-T14	Chitharal Jain Monuments (Bhagavati Temple and Jaina-bas Relief) with adjacent land comprised in part of survey plot no. 4752	Chithral		Kanyakumari	8°19′57″N 77°14′19″E	Chitharal Jain Monuments (Bhagavati Temple and Jaina-bas Relief) with adjacent land comprised in part of survey plot no. 4752 More images
N-TN-T15	Vattakottai Fort Vattakottai Forttogether with adjacent area comprised in survey plot nos. 1342, 1344/5 andpart of survey plot nos. 1340/4, 1340/3, 1341/1, 1341/4, 1344/6 and 1343/1	Vattakottai		Kanyakumari	8°07′30″N 77°33′54″E	Vattakottai Fort Vattakottai Forttogether with adjacent area comprised in survey plot nos. 1342, 1344/5 andpart of survey plot nos. 1340/4, 1340/3, 1341/1, 1341/4, 1344/6 and 1343/1 More images
N-TN-T16	Parthasarathi and Krishna Temples Parthasarathiand Krishna Temples Complextogether with adjacent area comprised in surveyplot nos.535/1, 534/2, 535/10, part of survey plot nos. 534/1, 533/7, 535/8, 533/2, 534/4,533/5, 533/6 and 535/9	Parthivapuram		Kanyakumari	8°16′31″N 77°10′16″E	Parthasarathi and Krishna Temples Parthasarathiand Krishna Temples Complextogether with adjacent area comprised in surveyplot nos.535/1, 534/2, 535/10, part of survey plot nos. 534/1, 533/7, 535/8, 533/2, 534/4,533/5, 533/6 and 535/9 More images
N-TN-T17	Rock (Kundankal)	Vaigainallur		Karur	10°53′56″N 78°23′20″E	Rock (Kundankal) More images
N-TN-T18	Jain Statues, Rock Inscription And Panchapandava Beds On The Hill	Kalluthu		Madurai	10°04′28″N 77°50′43″E	Upload Photo
N-TN-T19	Rock Cut Bas Relief And Beds And A Mutilated Jain Stone Image	Karadipatti		Madurai	9°55′51″N 78°01′24″E	Rock Cut Bas Relief And Beds And A Mutilated Jain Stone Image More images
N-TN-T20	Rock cut Bas-relief of Jain images with inscriptions in Vattalethu in Ammanamalai or Samanarmalai.	Keelakuilkudy		Madurai	9°55′20″N 78°02′57″E	Rock cut Bas-relief of Jain images with inscriptions in Vattalethu in Ammanamalai or Samanarmalai. More images
N-TN-T21	Panchapandava Bed, Jain Statues, And Brahmi And Vatteluttu (Malai Inscription On The Panchapandar)	Kilaiyur Keelavalavu		Madurai	10°03′49″N 78°24′00″E	Panchapandava Bed, Jain Statues, And Brahmi And Vatteluttu (Malai Inscription On The Panchapandar) More images
N-TN-T22	Rock Cut Beds Under Natural; Rock Shelter In Amanarmalai Or Samanar Malai	Melakuilkudy		Madurai	10°03′47″N 78°23′55″E	Upload Photo
N-TN-T23	Alagarmalai cavern with Panchapandava beds midway between Alagarmalai and Kidanpatti.	Melur		Madurai	10°04′52″N 78°14′18″E	Alagarmalai cavern with Panchapandava beds midway between Alagarmalai and Kidanpatti. More images
N-TN-T24	Cavern with Panchapandava beds on western slope of the hills and similar beds behind the Sikkandar mosque on the top.	Thiruparankundram		Madurai	9°52′41″N 78°04′00″E	Cavern with Panchapandava beds on western slope of the hills and similar beds behind the Sikkandar mosque on the top. More images
N-TN-T25	Rock–Cut Cave And Inscription	Thiruparankundram		Madurai	9°52′27″N 78°04′15″E	Rock–Cut Cave And Inscription More images
N-TN-T26	Ramapada Mandapam	Kodiakkadu		Nagapattinam	10°19′56″N 79°50′33″E	Ramapada Mandapam More images
N-TN-T27	Inscribed Stone	Kodiyakarai		Nagapattinam	10°16′29″N 79°48′49″E	Upload Photo
N-TN-T28	Kambarmedu	Melaiyur		Mayiladuthurai	11°02′38″N 79°34′44″E	Kambarmedu More images
N-TN-T29	Excavated remains and Buddhist vihara and temple at Pallananesvaram	Melaiyur (Kaveripattinam)		Mayiladuthurai	11°08′51″N 79°49′50″E	Excavated remains and Buddhist vihara and temple at Pallananesvaram More images
N-TN-T30	Town Gateway	Tranquebar (Tarangambadi)		Mayiladuthurai	11°01′34″N 79°51′07″E	Town Gateway More images
N-TN-T31	Group of sculptured dolmens	Banagudi Sholai		Nilgiris	11°23′34″N 76°51′46″E	Upload Photo
N-TN-T32	Jain Theerthankara Images	Alangudipatti		Pudukkottai	10°38′24″N 78°48′50″E	Upload Photo
N-TN-T33	Jain Image	Alathur		Pudukkottai	10°28′43″N 78°37′13″E	Upload Photo
N-TN-T34	Dolmens and Cairns	Amburapatti		Pudukkottai		Upload Photo
N-TN-T35	Prehistoric Burial Site (Known as Kurangapattarai)	Ammachatram		Pudukkottai	10°30′19″N 78°47′11″E	Prehistoric Burial Site (Known as Kurangapattarai) More images
N-TN-T36	Whole cave with the two Jain figures carved on the rock over it on the eastern side of Aluruttimalai in Ammachatram village and damaged inscription on the northern side of the sloping sheet of the rock below the same cave.	Ammachatram		Pudukkottai	10°31′34″N 78°46′27″E	Whole cave with the two Jain figures carved on the rock over it on the eastern side of Aluruttimalai in Ammachatram village and damaged inscription on the northern side of the sloping sheet of the rock below the same cave. More images
N-TN-T37	The Whole Of the Siva Temple (Meenakshi Sundareswarar Temple) And The Inscribed Stone In The Front Mandapam	Ammankurichi		Pudukkottai	10°20′37″N 78°32′04″E	Upload Photo
N-TN-T38	Prehistoric Burial Site, Stone Circle, and Menheirs	Annavasal		Pudukkottai	10°26′47″N 78°41′57″E	Upload Photo
N-TN-T39	Two Jain Tirthankara Images In A Coconut Plantation	Annavasal		Pudukkottai	10°27′51″N 78°41′46″E	Two Jain Tirthankara Images In A Coconut Plantation More images
N-TN-T40	Siva Temple	Ariyur		Pudukkottai	10°25′14″N 78°43′59″E	Upload Photo
N-TN-T41	Jain Tirthankara Image And Inscribed Stone	Chettipatty		Pudukkottai	10°39′55″N 78°49′31″E	Upload Photo
N-TN-T42	Ruined Jain Temple	Chettipatty		Pudukkottai	10°39′46″N 78°48′59″E	Upload Photo
N-TN-T43	Sarangatheeswara temple known as Thiruvagneeswarar temple.	Chittur		Pudukkottai	10°22′03″N 78°41′37″E	Sarangatheeswara temple known as Thiruvagneeswarar temple. More images
N-TN-T44	The dolmens in the right flank of Chokkanatham kanmoi.	Chokkanatha; Patti		Pudukkottai		Upload Photo
N-TN-T45	Rock-Cut Siva Shrine	Devarmalai		Pudukkottai	10°21′12″N 78°44′14″E	Rock-Cut Siva Shrine More images
N-TN-T46	Kalabham Udaiyar Temple	Irumbanadu		Pudukkottai		Upload Photo
N-TN-T47	Siva Temple (Agastheeswarar Temple) And Lion Pillar	Irumbanadu		Pudukkottai	10°03′30″N 78°59′16″E	Upload Photo
N-TN-T48	Soundararaja Perumal Temple	Irumbanadu		Pudukkottai	10°03′21″N 78°58′53″E	Upload Photo
N-TN-T49	Stone Idols Of Ganesa And Anjaneya	Irumbanadu		Pudukkottai		Upload Photo
N-TN-T50	Jain Thirthankara Idol	Kannangarakudi		Pudukkottai	10°13′19″N 78°48′06″E	Upload Photo
N-TN-T51	Jain Image, Stone Lion And Foundations Of A Jain Temple	Kannangudi		Pudukkottai	10°40′23″N 78°50′21″E	Upload Photo
N-TN-T52	Balasubrahmanya Temple	Kannanur		Pudukkottai	10°15′35″N 78°40′53″E	Balasubrahmanya Temple More images
N-TN-T53	Dolmens	Kilaiyur		Pudukkottai		Upload Photo
N-TN-T54	Uttamadanisvara Temple	Kilattaniyam		Pudukkottai	10°24′11″N 78°36′45″E	Uttamadanisvara Temple More images
N-TN-T55	Ruined Siva Temple	Kilayur(Kaliyapatti)		Pudukkottai	10°38′45″N 78°53′16″E	Ruined Siva Temple More images
N-TN-T56	Uttamanathaswamy Temple	Kiranur		Pudukkottai	10°34′19″N 78°47′03″E	Uttamanathaswamy Temple More images
N-TN-T57	Mucucundeswara temple and the tank in front of it	Kodumbalur		Pudukkottai	10°32′40″N 78°30′44″E	Mucucundeswara temple and the tank in front of it More images
N-TN-T58	Muvar Koil surrounding sub-Shrines, stone enclosure and stone well on the north-west corner.	Kodumbalur		Pudukkottai	10°32′30″N 78°31′09″E	Muvar Koil surrounding sub-Shrines, stone enclosure and stone well on the north-west corner. More images
N-TN-T59	Remains Of Aivar Koil	Kodumbalur		Pudukkottai	10°32′23″N 78°31′14″E	Upload Photo
N-TN-T60	Remains Of Structural Temples And Antiquities	Kodumbalur		Pudukkottai	10°32′32″N 78°31′09″E	Remains Of Structural Temples And Antiquities More images
N-TN-T61	Cavern on the western side of the Kudumiamalai temple hill.	Kudumiyanmalai		Pudukkottai	10°24′59″N 78°39′28″E	Cavern on the western side of the Kudumiamalai temple hill. More images
N-TN-T62	Amman Shrine (Akhilandeswari Temple)	Kudumiyanmalai		Pudukkottai	10°25′00″N 78°39′31″E	Amman Shrine (Akhilandeswari Temple) More images
N-TN-T63	Musical Inscription	Kudumiyanmalai		Pudukkottai	10°24′59″N 78°39′31″E	Musical Inscription More images
N-TN-T64	The rock-cut shrine called Melakkovil with mantapam in front.	Kudumiyanmalai		Pudukkottai	10°24′59″N 78°39′31″E	The rock-cut shrine called Melakkovil with mantapam in front. More images
N-TN-T65	The Sikhanathaswami temple.	Kudumiyanmalai		Pudukkottai	10°24′59″N 78°39′34″E	The Sikhanathaswami temple. More images
N-TN-T66	Eight Natural Caverns, Jain Idols And Inscriptions In Kudagumalai, Aladiperumal Paraika	Kulathur		Pudukkottai	10°31′38″N 78°46′47″E	Upload Photo
N-TN-T67	Ruined Siva Temple (The Iswaran Kovil)	Kulathur		Pudukkottai	10°33′17″N 78°46′57″E	Ruined Siva Temple (The Iswaran Kovil) More images
N-TN-T68	Rock-Cut Cave Siva Temple, Hall of Hundred Pillared Mandapam Or Car Mandapam With Wheels In Front Part Of The Plinth	Kunnandarkoil		Pudukkottai	10°34′55″N 78°53′52″E	Rock-Cut Cave Siva Temple, Hall of Hundred Pillared Mandapam Or Car Mandapam With Wheels In Front Part Of The Plinth More images
N-TN-T69	Jain Idols And Remains Of The Jain Temple	Letchumanpatti		Pudukkottai	10°37′02″N 78°45′48″E	Upload Photo
N-TN-T70	Idols In The Southern Bund Of Teppakulam Or Urani	Madarapatti		Pudukkottai	10°32′08″N 78°31′44″E	Upload Photo
N-TN-T71	(i) The Jain Theerthankara image in Sighasana posture lying in bas-relief on a slab (ii) The Remains of the temple (iii) The Ganesa image (iv) The Nandi, with the inscriptions on the basement and the surrounding portions in the Karuppar hill.	Mailapatti		Pudukkottai	10°23′04″N 78°45′07″E	Upload Photo
N-TN-T72	Two Rock-Cut Siva Shrines On The Eastern And Southern Slopes Of The Hill	Malakkoil (Malaiyakoil)		Pudukkottai	10°20′07″N 78°42′45″E	Two Rock-Cut Siva Shrines On The Eastern And Southern Slopes Of The Hill More images
N-TN-T73	Rock-cut Siva Temple (Pallava 8th century A.D.).Rock-Cut Siva Temple	Malayadipatti		Pudukkottai	10°39′14″N 78°53′49″E	Rock-cut Siva Temple (Pallava 8th century A.D.).Rock-Cut Siva Temple More images
N-TN-T74	Rock-cut Vishnu cave Temple (Pallava 8-9th century A.D.). Rock-Cut Vishnu Temple	Malayadipatti		Pudukkottai	10°39′15″N 78°53′48″E	Rock-cut Vishnu cave Temple (Pallava 8-9th century A.D.). Rock-Cut Vishnu Temple More images
N-TN-T75	Jain Temple Site	Mangathevanpatti		Pudukkottai	10°33′24″N 78°49′20″E	Jain Temple Site More images
N-TN-T76	Ruins of the Jain shrine.	Mangathevanpatti		Pudukkottai	10°33′24″N 78°49′20″E	Upload Photo
N-TN-T77	Siva And Pillayar Temple	Mangudi		Pudukkottai	10°24′52″N 78°42′54″E	Upload Photo
N-TN-T78	Jain Tirthankara Idol (Aiyanar) And Devi Idols	Marudur		Pudukkottai	10°34′37″N 78°49′28″E	Jain Tirthankara Idol (Aiyanar) And Devi Idols More images
N-TN-T79	Melanilaipatti, Mennandar Pilliar Temple (Mennaanda Moorthi Vinayagar Temple)	Melanilaivayal		Pudukkottai	10°11′28″N 78°50′38″E	Upload Photo
N-TN-T80	Prehistoric Burial Site	Melur		Pudukkottai	10°27′18″N 78°46′23″E	Upload Photo
N-TN-T81	The Stone circles, Prehistoric burials, slabs Jain Tirthankara idol and the relics of the old Jain temple.	Melur		Pudukkottai	10°27′21″N 78°46′26″E	Upload Photo
N-TN-T82	Vishnu Idol	Melur		Pudukkottai	10°27′17″N 78°46′27″E	Upload Photo
N-TN-T83	Dolmens	Muttampatti		Pudukkottai		Upload Photo
N-TN-T84	The Tirupperumanadar temple called Madattukovil.	Nangupatti (Madattukkoil)		Pudukkottai	10°34′43″N 78°40′40″E	Upload Photo
N-TN-T85	Jain idol, inscribed stone slab ,two Durga idols and Vishnu idol.	Nanjur		Pudukkottai	10°34′45″N 78°48′24″E	Upload Photo
N-TN-T86	The old burial sites in the three groups	Narangiyan; Pettai		Pudukkottai		Upload Photo
N-TN-T87	Amman Koil (Melaikadambar Koil And The Siva Temple To Its West)	Narthamalai		Pudukkottai	10°30′47″N 78°46′03″E	Amman Koil (Melaikadambar Koil And The Siva Temple To Its West) More images
N-TN-T88	Rock-cut Siva Temple called Paliyili Iswaran with structural moulded plinth in front.	Narthamalai		Pudukkottai	10°30′49″N 78°46′04″E	Rock-cut Siva Temple called Paliyili Iswaran with structural moulded plinth in front. More images
N-TN-T89	Rock-cut Vishnu shrine called Samanar Kudagu with structural moulded plinth in front.	Narttamalai		Pudukkottai	10°30′23″N 78°45′26″E	Rock-cut Vishnu shrine called Samanar Kudagu with structural moulded plinth in front. More images
N-TN-T90	Vijayala Choliswaram and the group of Sub-Shrines around it.	Narttamalai		Pudukkottai	10°30′17″N 78°45′29″E	Vijayala Choliswaram and the group of Sub-Shrines around it. More images
N-TN-T91	Jain Image And The Inscription To The South Of It On The Summit Of The Sadayaparai	Nathampannai		Pudukkottai	10°23′19″N 78°47′35″E	Upload Photo
N-TN-T92	Siva (Valarmadhiswarar) Temple	Nirpalani		Pudukkottai	10°37′16″N 78°42′39″E	Siva (Valarmadhiswarar) Temple More images
N-TN-T93	Siva Temple	Panangudi		Pudukkottai	10°26′16″N 78°43′00″E	Siva Temple More images
N-TN-T94	Vishnu Temple	Panangudi		Pudukkottai	10°26′11″N 78°42′57″E	Upload Photo
N-TN-T95	The dolmens	Perungulur		Pudukkottai		Upload Photo
N-TN-T96	Prehistoric Dolmens	Peyal		Pudukkottai		Upload Photo
N-TN-T97	Rajendracolisvaram Temple (Siva Temple)	Ponamaravati		Pudukkottai	10°16′36″N 78°32′18″E	Rajendracolisvaram Temple (Siva Temple) More images
N-TN-T98	Dolmens and Ayyanar Images	Poyyamanai And Virudupatti		Pudukkottai	10°34′51″N 78°28′02″E	Upload Photo
N-TN-T99	Jain Theerthankara images now lying in the dry lands to the north-east of Alangudipatti hamlet.	Puliyur		Pudukkottai	10°38′18″N 78°48′55″E	Upload Photo
N-TN-T100	Jain Image And The Surrounding Temple Site Locally Called 'Mottai Pillayarkovil'	Puttambur		Pudukkottai	10°28′11″N 78°50′27″E	Upload Photo
N-TN-T101	Prehistoric Burial Site	Puttambur		Pudukkottai		Upload Photo
N-TN-T102	The Rock-cut shrine called Pushpavaneswara.	Puvalakkudi		Pudukkottai	10°20′02″N 78°37′33″E	The Rock-cut shrine called Pushpavaneswara. More images
N-TN-T103	Stone Sluice With Nandipottan's Inscription	Rajalipatti		Pudukkottai	10°36′44″N 78°28′34″E	Upload Photo
N-TN-T104	Stone Idols Of Vishnu And Devi And Siva Temple	Rasipuram		Pudukkottai	10°39′01″N 78°43′20″E	Upload Photo
N-TN-T105	Prehistoric Burial Site	Satyamangalam		Pudukkottai		Upload Photo
N-TN-T106	Jain Mound, Jain Images, Other Idols And Lion Pillars	Sembattur		Pudukkottai	10°28′53″N 78°50′16″E	Upload Photo
N-TN-T107	Natural Cavern Called Andarmatam	Sembuthi		Pudukkottai	10°20′10″N 78°35′19″E	Upload Photo
N-TN-T108	Cairns and Urns	Sendakudy		Pudukkottai	10°17′58″N 79°04′40″E	Upload Photo
N-TN-T109	Dolmens and Urns	Sengalur		Pudukkottai	10°40′13″N 78°53′06″E	Dolmens and Urns More images
N-TN-T110	Vishnu And Sridevi Idols	Sengirai		Pudukkottai	10°16′21″N 78°52′42″E	Upload Photo
N-TN-T111	The Bumisvaraswami temple.	Sevalur		Pudukkottai	10°17′36″N 78°38′00″E	The Bumisvaraswami temple. More images
N-TN-T112	Rock-cut Jain Temple (Ariver Koil).	Sittannavasal		Pudukkottai	10°27′21″N 78°43′33″E	Rock-cut Jain Temple (Ariver Koil). More images
N-TN-T113	Dolmens in Annavasal Vattam	Sittannavasal		Pudukkottai	10°26′52″N 78°43′08″E	Upload Photo
N-TN-T114	Natural Cavern With Stone Beds And Brahmi And Old Tamil Inscriptions Called Enaadipattam	Sittannavasal		Pudukkottai	10°27′01″N 78°43′30″E	Natural Cavern With Stone Beds And Brahmi And Old Tamil Inscriptions Called Enaadipattam More images
N-TN-T115	Tiruvilangudi Siva Temple	Suriyur		Pudukkottai	10°37′42″N 78°38′16″E	Upload Photo
N-TN-T116	Dolmens (Known As Kurangupattarai)	Tayinipatti		Pudukkottai	10°31′36″N 78°45′44″E	Upload Photo
N-TN-T117	The Jain Theerthankara image seated on a pedestal to the east of the bund of Periakanmoi and to the west of Siva temple.	Tekkatur		Pudukkottai	10°17′53″N 78°47′14″E	The Jain Theerthankara image seated on a pedestal to the east of the bund of Periakanmoi and to the west of Siva temple. More images
N-TN-T118	Siva Temple	Tennangudi		Pudukkottai	10°28′23″N 78°51′54″E	Upload Photo
N-TN-T119	Prehistoric Burial Site	Thekkattur		Pudukkottai		Upload Photo
N-TN-T120	The Todaiyur Siva Temple by side of the bundof Todaikulam.	Thodaiyur		Pudukkottai	10°29′58″N 78°48′32″E	Upload Photo
N-TN-T121	The Sanctum of the old Siva Temple.	Tirukalambur		Pudukkottai	10°12′22″N 78°29′56″E	Upload Photo
N-TN-T122	Sundareswara Temple with 7 sub-shrines	Tirukkattalai		Pudukkottai	10°22′11″N 78°51′04″E	Sundareswara Temple with 7 sub-shrines More images
N-TN-T123	Kalasakkadu Burial Site	Tirukkattalai		Pudukkottai	10°22′22″N 78°50′31″E	Upload Photo
N-TN-T124	Rock-Cut Siva Temple (Satyagiriswara Temple)	Tirumayam		Pudukkottai	10°14′49″N 78°45′06″E	Rock-Cut Siva Temple (Satyagiriswara Temple) More images
N-TN-T125	Rock-Cut Vishnu Temple (Satyamurti Temple)	Tirumayam		Pudukkottai	10°14′49″N 78°45′07″E	Rock-Cut Vishnu Temple (Satyamurti Temple) More images
N-TN-T126	Stone And Brick Fort (Thirumayam Fort)	Tirumayam		Pudukkottai	10°14′51″N 78°45′03″E	Stone And Brick Fort (Thirumayam Fort)
N-TN-T127	Jain Image In Water spread Of Pudukulam	Tiruppur		Pudukkottai	10°33′18″N 78°50′44″E	Upload Photo
N-TN-T128	The Choliswara Udayar temple.	Tiruppur		Pudukkottai	10°33′23″N 78°50′52″E	The Choliswara Udayar temple. More images
N-TN-T129	Group of Dolmens	Tiruppur		Pudukkottai	10°33′28″N 78°50′52″E	Upload Photo
N-TN-T130	Prehistoric Burial Site	Vadugapatti		Pudukkottai		Upload Photo
N-TN-T131	Jain Tirthankara Image And Inscribed Stone	Valavambatti (valavanpatti)		Pudukkottai	10°33′41″N 78°59′29″E	Upload Photo
N-TN-T132	Siva Temple (Agatheeswarar Temple)	Varappur		Pudukkottai	10°27′45″N 78°58′35″E	Upload Photo
N-TN-T133	The Sivan Koil and its premises on the western of Enadi kanmoi.	Varpet		Pudukkottai	10°15′55″N 78°31′19″E	The Sivan Koil and its premises on the western of Enadi kanmoi. More images
N-TN-T134	Prehistoric Burial Site	Vathanna; Kurichi		Pudukkottai		Upload Photo
N-TN-T135	Jain Tirthankara Image	Veerakkudy		Pudukkottai	10°32′53″N 78°51′44″E	Jain Tirthankara Image More images
N-TN-T136	Agastisvara Temple	Vellanur		Pudukkottai	10°27′24″N 78°47′36″E	Upload Photo
N-TN-T137	Kailasanatha Temple	Vellanur		Pudukkottai	10°27′22″N 78°47′49″E	Upload Photo
N-TN-T138	Prehistoric Burial Site	Vilapatti		Pudukkottai		Upload Photo
N-TN-T139	The Two lion pillars in the Vahanamantapam attached to the sri Subramanyaswami temple.	Viralimalai		Pudukkottai	10°36′10″N 78°32′46″E	Upload Photo
N-TN-T140	Siva Temple	Visalur		Pudukkottai	10°38′36″N 78°51′56″E	Siva Temple More images
N-TN-T141	Boulder Stone Bed And Brahmi Inscriptions On The Hill And Rock-Cut Temple With Inscription At The Foot Of The Hill	Kunnakudi		Sivaganga	10°06′52″N 78°41′55″E	Boulder Stone Bed And Brahmi Inscriptions On The Hill And Rock-Cut Temple With Inscription At The Foot Of The Hill More images
N-TN-T142	Two rock cut temples with inscriptions in Varunachimalai	Thirumalapuram		Tenkasi	9°04′31″N 77°24′28″E	Two rock cut temples with inscriptions in Varunachimalai More images
N-TN-T143	Airavatesvara Temple	Chatram Darasuram		Thanjavur	10°56′54″N 79°21′24″E	Airavatesvara Temple More images
N-TN-T144	Big Cannon (Rajagopaol Cannon) In The First Rampart and the Bastions in Ts No 608 Of Ward III	Thanjavur		Thanjavur	10°47′36″N 79°08′20″E	Big Cannon (Rajagopaol Cannon) In The First Rampart and the Bastions in Ts No 608 Of Ward III More images
N-TN-T145	Schwartz (Christ) Church in the north-east portion of the little Fort.	Thanjavur		Thanjavur	10°47′09″N 79°07′53″E	Schwartz (Christ) Church in the north-east portion of the little Fort. More images
N-TN-T146	Sivaganga Little Fort Enclosing The Big Temple	Thanjavur		Thanjavur	10°47′04″N 79°07′54″E	Sivaganga Little Fort Enclosing The Big Temple More images
N-TN-T147	Karuppannasvami Rock And Jain Sculpture	Uttamapalayam		Theni	9°48′43″N 77°19′49″E	Karuppannasvami Rock And Jain Sculpture More images
N-TN-T148	Bhaktavatsala Temple	Seramadevi		Tirunelveli	8°41′59″N 77°34′16″E	Bhaktavatsala Temple More images
N-TN-T149	Valliswara temple	Tiruvalisvaram		Tirunelveli	8°44′22″N 77°26′24″E	Valliswara temple More images
N-TN-T150	Ancient Site	Kunnathur		Tirunelveli	8°41′50″N 77°40′20″E	Ancient Site More images
N-TN-T151	Prehistoric Site	Adichanallur		Thoothukudi	8°37′57″N 77°52′37″E	Prehistoric Site More images
N-TN-T152	Prehistoric Site	Kalvoi		Thoothukudi	8°37′44″N 77°52′31″E	Upload Photo
N-TN-T153	Prehistoric Site	Karungulam		Thoothukudi	8°37′51″N 77°52′30″E	Upload Photo
N-TN-T154	Head Sluice Periavoikal alias Nattu vaikal	Musiri		Tiruchirappalli	10°56′44″N 78°26′27″E	Upload Photo
N-TN-T155	Rock Fort (i) Path leading to the site in front of the lower cave (ii) Site in front of the lower cave (iii) Lower cave (iv) Path leading to the upper cave (v) Upper cave	Rock Fort, Trichy		Tiruchirappalli	10°49′41″N 78°41′50″E	Rock Fort (i) Path leading to the site in front of the lower cave (ii) Site in front of the lower cave (iii) Lower cave (iv) Path leading to the upper cave (v) Upper cave More images
N-TN-T156	Kovil (Korangunatha Temple)	Srinivasanallur		Tiruchirappalli	10°58′24″N 78°21′45″E	Kovil (Korangunatha Temple) More images
N-TN-T157	Fort Gateway	Tiruchirappalli		Tiruchirappalli	10°49′36″N 78°41′36″E	Fort Gateway More images
N-TN-T158	Sri Erumbeswaraswami Temple	Tiruverumbur		Tiruchirappalli	10°47′33″N 78°46′05″E	Sri Erumbeswaraswami Temple More images
N-TN-T159	Pre-historic sites popularly known as "pandava graves"	Kanyampundi		Tiruppur	11°07′08″N 77°17′18″E	Pre-historic sites popularly known as "pandava graves" More images
N-TN-T160	Sugrivesvara Temple and Tank	Sircar Periyapalayam		Tiruppur	11°08′02″N 77°23′56″E	Sugrivesvara Temple and Tank More images
N-TN-T161	Muruganathasvami Temple	Tirumurugan-poondi		Tiruppur	11°09′50″N 77°18′41″E	Muruganathasvami Temple More images
N-TN-T162	Tirumal Nayak's Palace	Srivilliputhur		Virudhunagar	9°30′28″N 77°37′56″E	Tirumal Nayak's Palace More images

== See also ==
- List of Monuments of National Importance in India for other Monuments of National Importance in India
- List of State Protected Monuments in Tamil Nadu
