= Schwartz Church =

Church in India

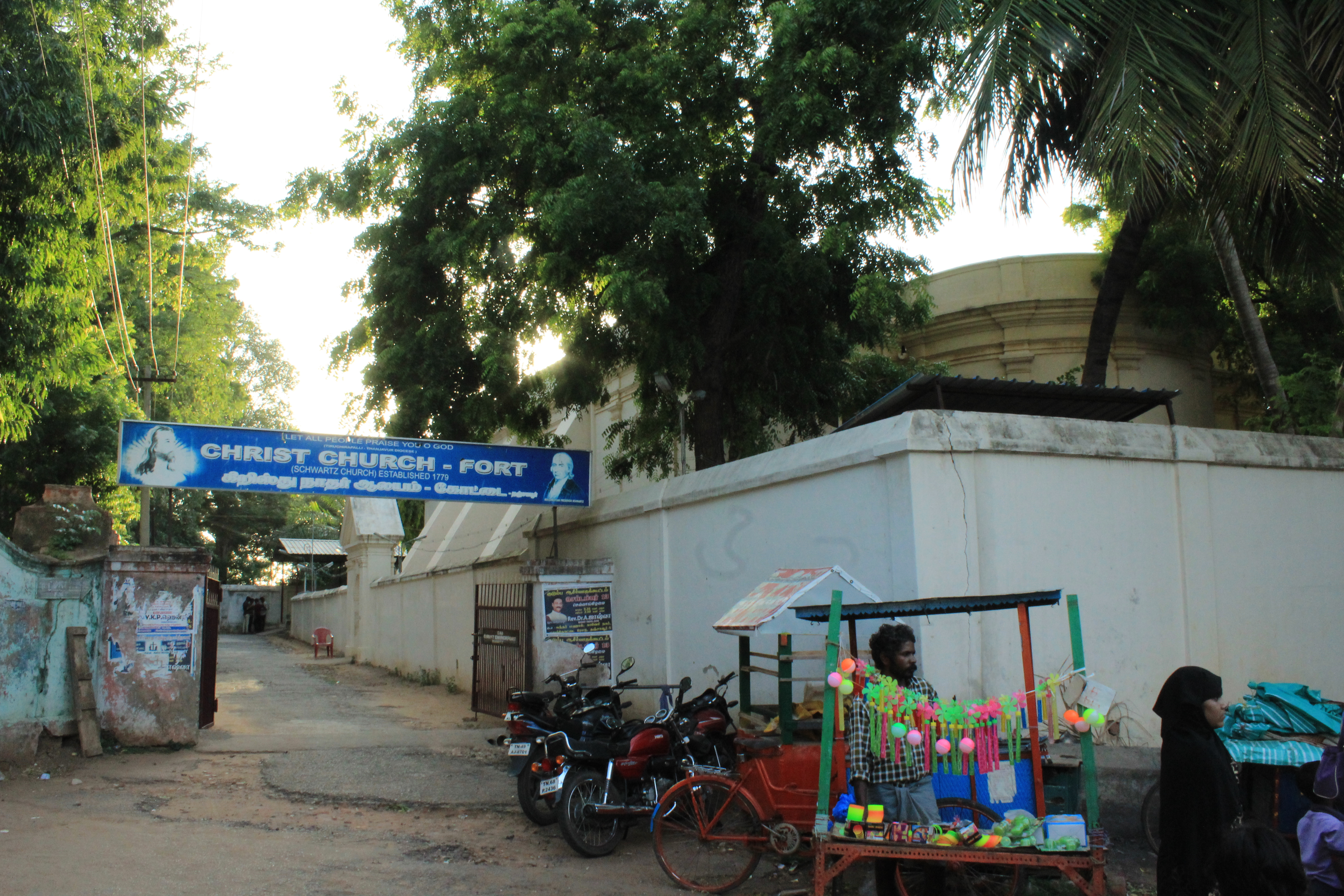
Outer view of the church

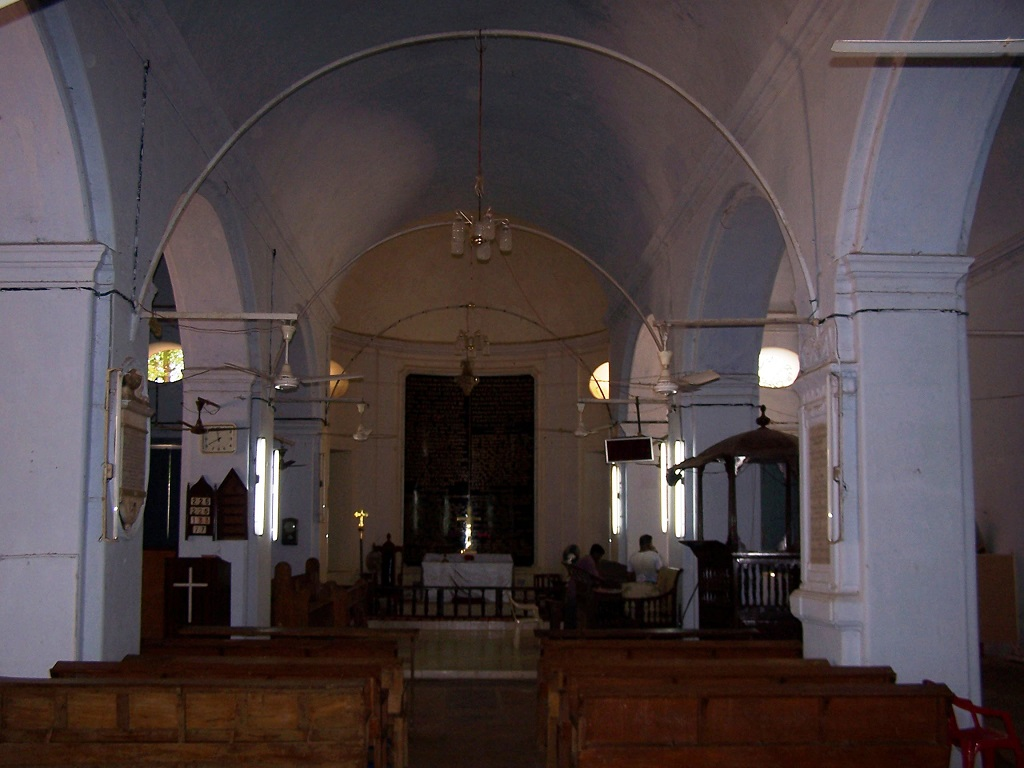
Church interior

Schwartz Church is a church situated in Thanjavur, India. Constructed by the Danish missionary Christian Friedrich Schwarz in 1779, the church is a plain building with few distinctive features. There is a note to the effect that Major Stevens has laid a foundation stone for the church under nine feet depth.Father Schwartz has conducted regular masses in this church from April 1780.

John Flaxman an Italian sculptor who lived in London has sculpted this statue in 1807 on the request of King Serfoji II. This statue was installed in this church in the year 1811. This was known from the writings of Tanjore Vedanayagam Sastriar a court poet in the palace of Serfoji II who has recorded that this statue was installed in the year 1811 the year in which his daughter Gnanadeepam was born. He has further recorded that the white marble statue bearing the images of the King Serfoji II and Father Schwartz was installed in the big church in small fort called Sivaganga Park. In those days this church was known as big church.

Within the precincts of the church is a 1797 sculpture of Schwartz on his death-bed with the Thanjavur Maratha king Serfoji II and the missionary Guericke beside him. Schwartz used to live in a house to the north-west of the church, which has since been converted into a school.
