= Thirunanthikarai =

Thirunanthikarai is a village situated in Thirparappu panchayat, in the Kanyakumari district of Tamil Nadu, India. This village comes under the post office of Kulasekharam, 3 km away, and is located along the Kulasekharam–Pechiparai road.

The Thirunadhikkara Cave Temple is a popular destination for Shivalaya Ootam, the 100 km pilgrimage run by Shiva devotees.

== See also ==
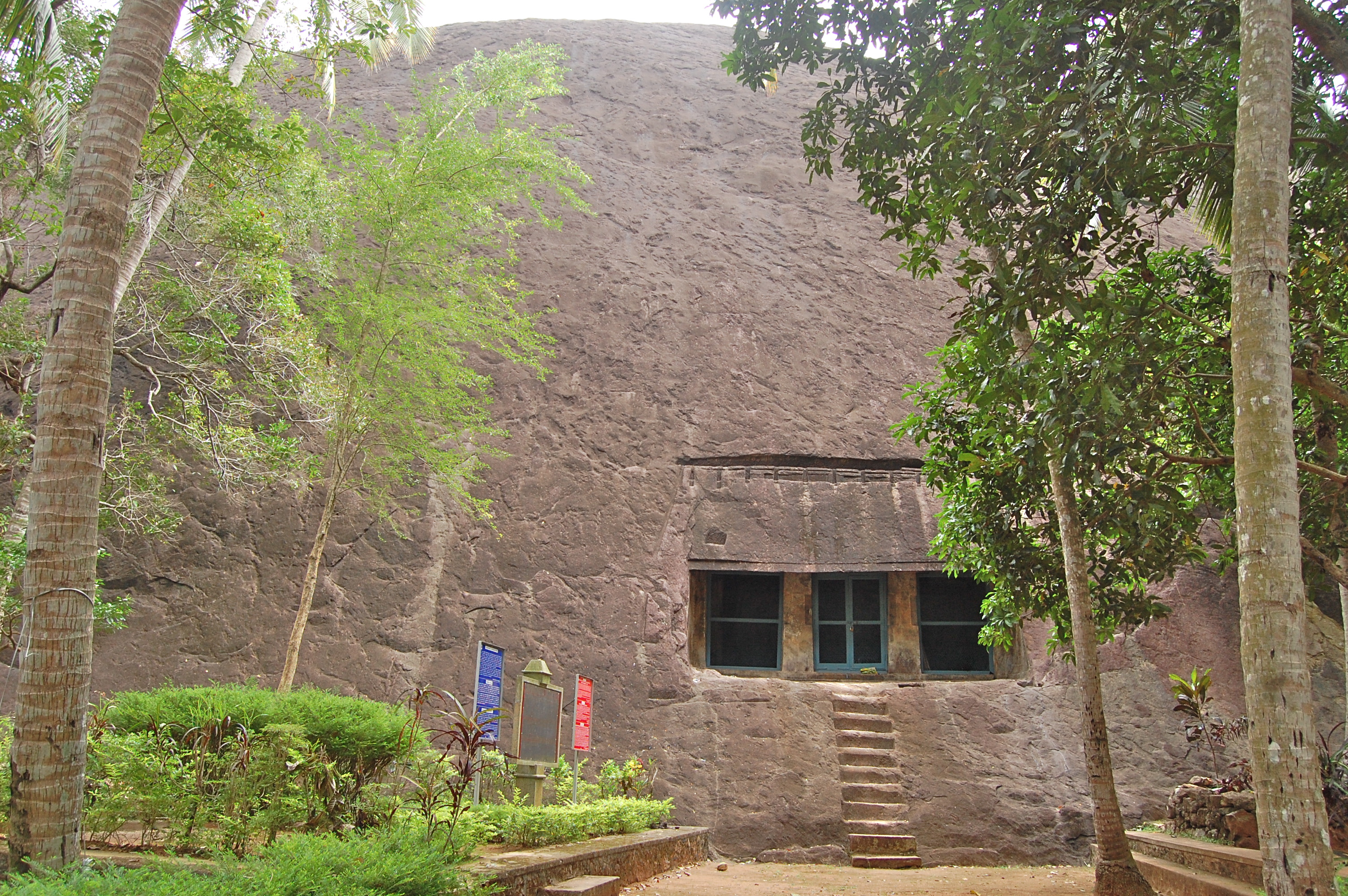
9th-century rock-cut cave temple to the north of Nandeeswara temple, Tirunandikkare, Kanyakumari district

- Thirunadhikkara Cave Temple, also referred to as Thirunanthikarai rock-cut Shiva temple, is a 9th-century rock-cut Hindu cave temple in Kanyakumari district.
