= Thirupparankundram Rock-cut Cave and Inscription =

Cave in India

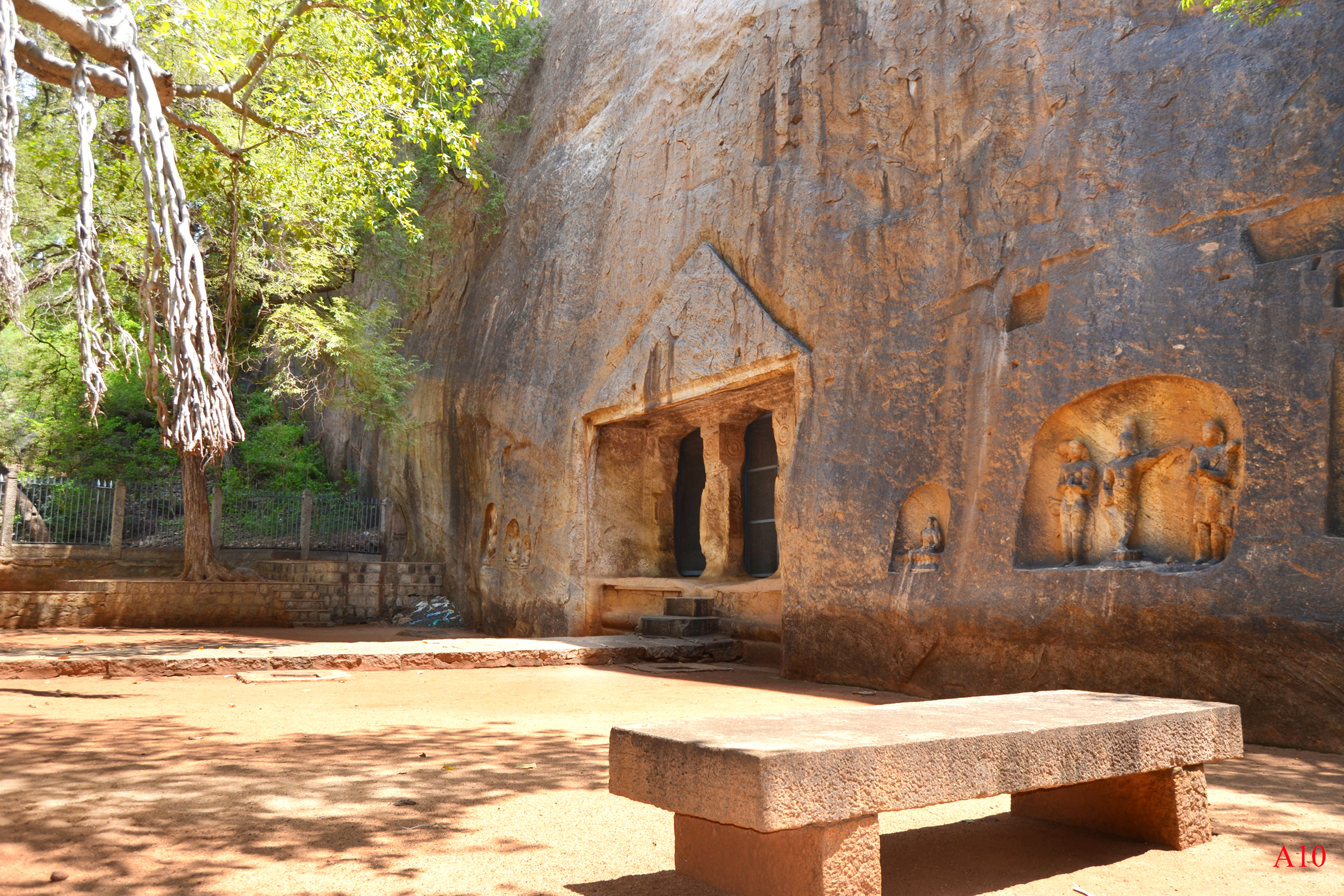
- Thirupparankundram rock-cut cave temple entrance

Religion
- Affiliation: Hinduism, Jainism

Location
- Location: south Skandamalai, Thirupparankundram, Tamil Nadu
- Interactive map of Thirupparankundram Rock-cut Cave and Inscription
- Coordinates: 09°52′27″N 78°04′14″E

Architecture
- Completed: 8th–13th century

Thirupparankundram Rock-cut Cave and Inscription, also known as Umai Andar or Umaiyandar temple, is a rock cut cave temple with inscriptions at the foot of the Thirupparankundram rock hill's south face. It is located in the town of Thirupparankundram, about 10 kilometres (6.2 mi) southwest of Madurai city, Tamil Nadu, India. It consists of several layers of construction, the earliest is dated to the 8th-century early Pandya period, and the last to the 13th century.

== Location ==
Thirupparankundram Rock-cut Cave and Inscription is located in Thiruparankundram in its landmark hill that towers to a height of 1,048 feet (319 m) and has a circumference of over 2 miles (3.2 km). This hill contains some of the earliest cave temples of Shaivism tradition in the Madurai region, of which this temple is one. The hill is sacred to the Hindus. They call it Skandamalai (lit. "hill of Skanda (Murugan, Kartikeya) – the god of war"). One of the early Shaivism-tradition cave temple at the northern foot of the hill, which expanded between the 7th and 15th centuries into what is now a major temple complex known as the Thirupparamkunram Murugan temple. On the western edge of this hill are some of the oldest known Jain beds with a few Tamil-Brahmi inscriptions dated between the 2nd century BCE and the early centuries of the common era. Additional Jain beds, Tamil language inscriptions in later era script and Jain bas-reliefs are found in several caverns along a trail that climbs up the hill towards the rock-cut Kasi Viswanathar temple. The temple and these upper level Jain monuments are dated to between the 7th and 11th century. A small Saptamatrika temple, a spring called Saraswati Tirtha, and the Thirupparankundram Rock-cut Cave and Inscription monument are found near the foot of the south face of the hill. The last is dated between the 8th and 13th century.

The Thirupparankundram rock-cut monument is a protected national monument and is managed by the Archaeological Survey of India (ASI N-TN-C88). The set of six Jain beds are locally called Pancha Pandava after the Mahabharata brothers and Draupadi. It is a misnomer, and with the Tamil Brahmi inscribed Jain beds on the west edge and Jain bas-reliefs along the trail to rock-cut Kasi Viswanathar temple at the south-side top, it is also a protected monument (ASI N-TN-C87).

== Description ==
The Thirupparankundram Rock-cut cave monument is at the foot of Skandamalai with a south facing single entrance. The rock-cut monument façade has Shaiva bas-reliefs to the left and right before the entrance. They are in minimalist style with no background ornaments or decorative reliefs. All are defaced and damaged to varying degrees but with enough iconographic details left to be identified. These are Bhairava with a his dog, a Vighneswara (Ganesha), and a few pre-8th century and post 5th-century Shaiva poet saints such as Appar, Sambandar and Siruthondar. These help date and confirm the association of this rock-cut temple to the Shaivism tradition of Hinduism. There is another rishi, defaced and damaged, who is likely Vedavyasa, much admired over Indian history for his contributions to major Hindu texts.

=== Mandapam ===
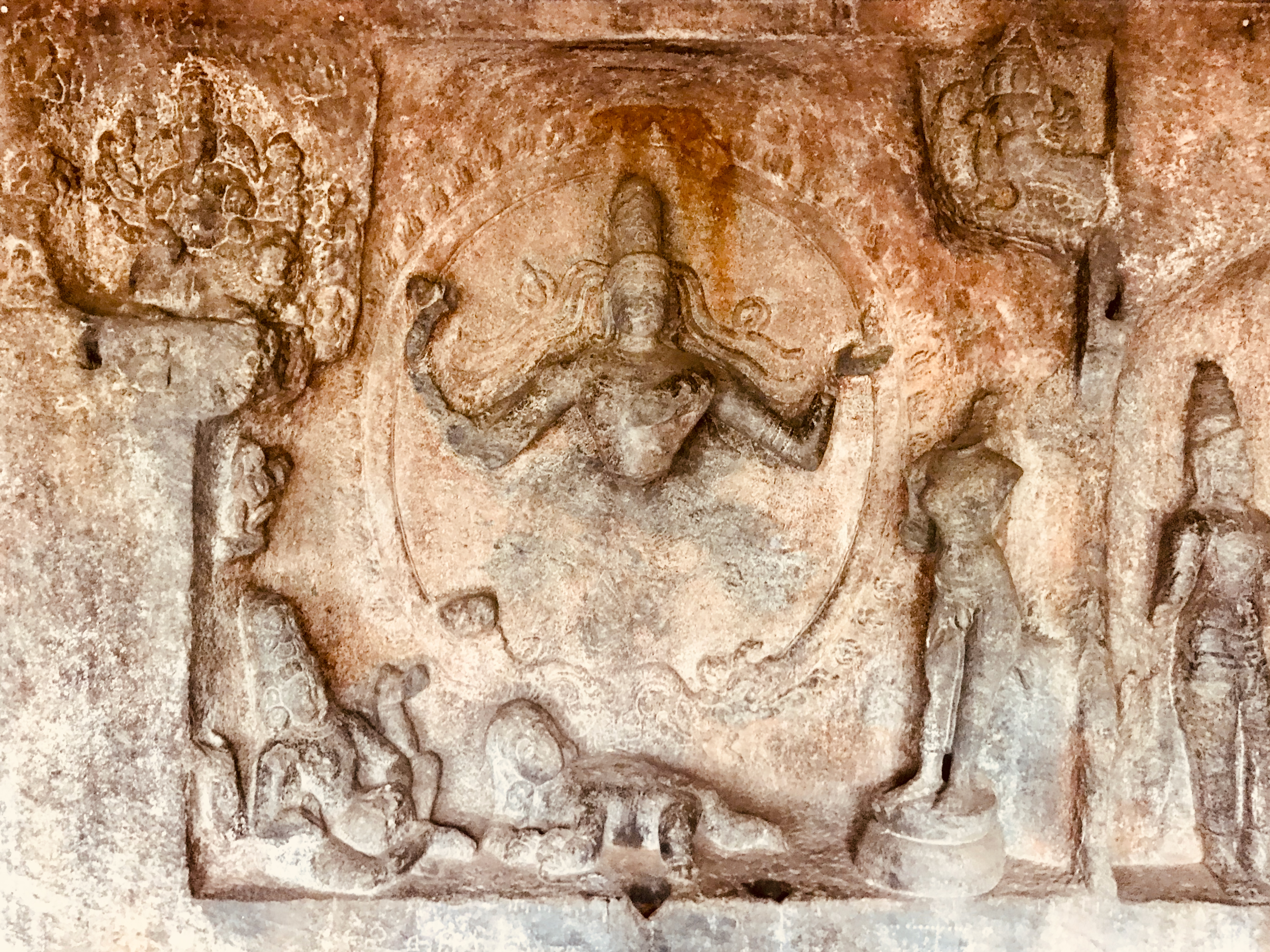
The Nataraja panel in the mandapam.

Inside is a mandapam that is 20.2 feet (6.2 m) by 7.7 feet (2.3 m), an unusual size suggesting a likely expansion with two or more stages of construction. The mandapam's northern wall has two badly damaged panels, both minimalist with no background ornaments or decorative reliefs, but with all the essential iconography. One with carvings of Nataraja Shiva and his family members, another which has been interpreted as Skanda or a king with two wives. On the other walls of the mandapam are two major, long inscriptions predominantly in Tamil language and Vatteluttu script, with some Sanskrit in Grantha script.

The Nataraja panel is heavily damaged with most of the relief below his waist chopped off. The upper portion is also defaced, his hands also chopped off. Yet, it is dancing Shiva in the South Indian style, surrounded by the flaming tiruvasi (Hindu iconographic detail commonly found with a major god or goddess). This flaming tiruvasi is found in Nataraja bronzes. The Nataraja stands on a miniaturized demon at the bottom of the panel. Above on the pilasters are ten-handed Ganesha with his bowl of sweets (left), and Subramanya (Kartikeya, Skanda) with his peacock (right). Kali and Nandi too are in the panel, and there is one goddess who survives in beheaded form with her hands chopped off (likely Parvati). (Note: This cave monument and other Hindu temples in Madurai and Thirupparankundram were likely damaged during the Delhi Sultanate invasion and the Hindu-Islamic wars associated with the Madurai Sultanate. Like elsewhere in India, some of the surviving Islamic monuments in the Madurai area are built with Hindu and Jain temple parts.)

The panel that is east of the Nataraja panel is likely Subramanya with his wives Valli and Devayani. The minimalist style is found here again, something that has led some to suggest that this is the king who expanded this rock-cut cave.

=== Grabhagriya ===
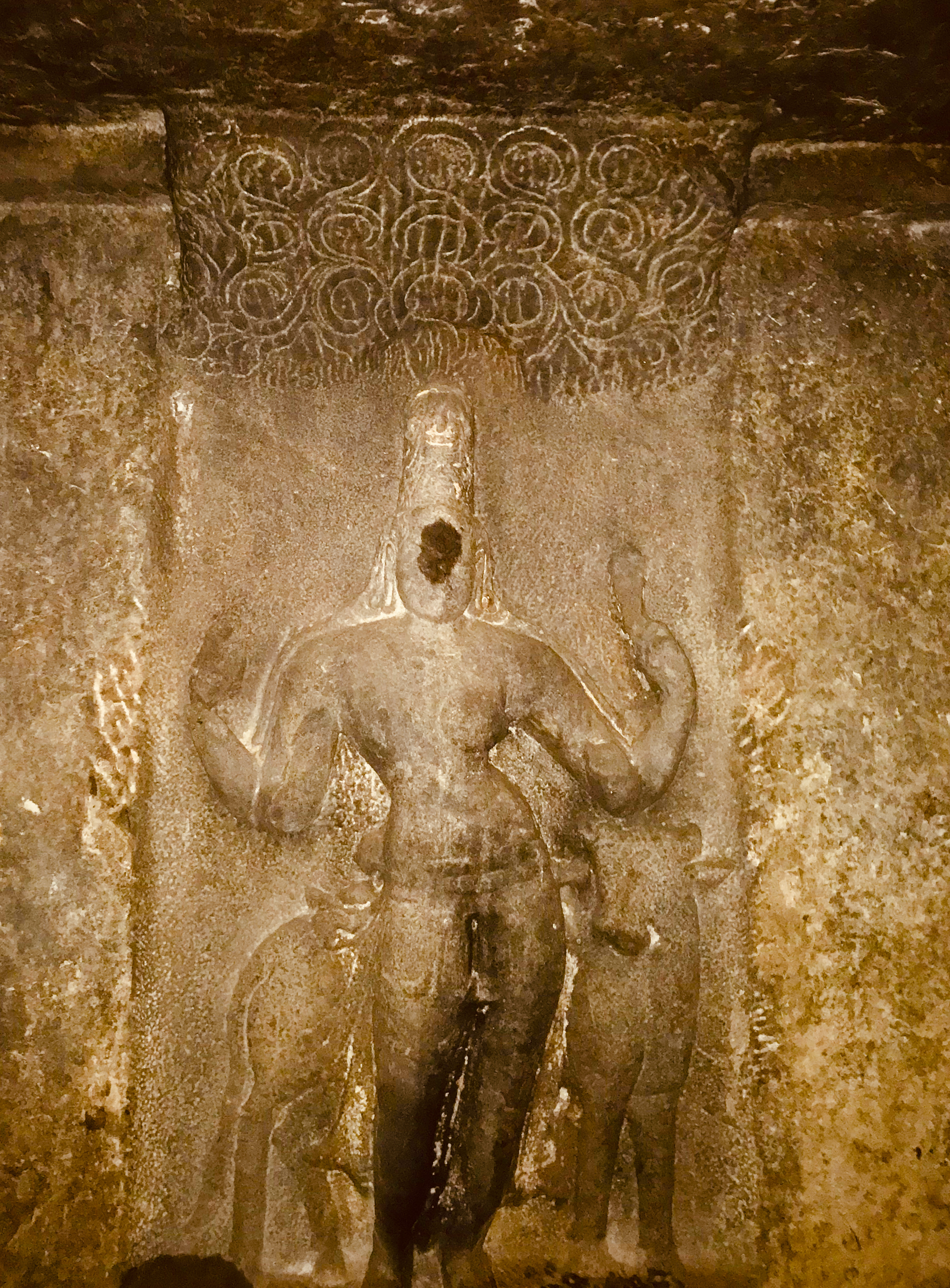
The Ardhanarisvara with Nandi panel in the sanctum; the decoration above the head has been variously interpreted as leaf-like or floral or clouds.

The mandapam leads to a garbhagriya (sanctum) dedicated to Shiva. This sanctum opens to the east. On the back wall of the sanctum is a carving of Ardhanarishvara – half Shiva and half Parvati, with Nandi standing behind and a limited floral, leaf-like decoration above the head. This carving is also minimalist, with no background ornaments or decorative reliefs. It has been controversial. Some state that there was a Jain Tirthankara relief here which was chiseled out and transformed into Ardhanarishvara in the 8th century because of the creeper-like "pepal leaf" (Ficus religiosa) motif above. Outside, one of the reliefs is a damaged Bhairava with his iconographic dog, which shares iconographic features of a standing Tirthankara. The Jain temple to Shaiva temple theory was originally additionally supported by a mistranslation along with a speculative commentary about destruction of Madurai Jain temples by an 11th-century Pandya-Chola king by James Nelson – a colonial-era civil services official. As more inscriptions about dynasties and Thirupparankundram monuments were discovered in Tamil Nadu, epigraphists starting with Robert Sewell, J.F. Fleet and V. Rangacharya rejected the 11th century and other speculations of Nelson.

Beyond the technicalities associated with transforming a flat-chested Tirthankara into an Ardhanarishvara panel where the Parvati half is shown with a generous forward-projecting breast and the Shiva side is flat, other scholars have questioned why numerous other Jain caverns and Tirthankara reliefs near the Thirupparankundram Rock-cut Cave were left intact. This would not be the case if the local Shaiva Hindus were violently seeking to punish or erase Jain artwork. The historian and epigraphist Champakalakshmi counters that as more and more Jain artwork and inscriptions have been discovered in Tamil Nadu, it is clear that Jain artwork and inscriptions increased over the 7th to the 13th, in some cases to the 17th century. Further, these Jain inscriptions state that Tamil kings patronized and helped Jains build monasteries and temples over this period in their kingdom. This, states Champakalakshmi, "does not seem to indicate a conflict" over these centuries between Tamil Jains and Tamil Hindus, though she acknowledges that a section of Shaiva literature does criticize and denigrate the Jains. Swamy, a scholar of Tamil texts and history, states that the Tamil literature such as the Tevaram, whose Shaiva saints are depicted on the outer walls of this temple, and one that includes stories about a single Shaiva poet-saint simultaneously debating and defeating 8,000 Jain scholars and thereafter Tamil Jains committing mass suicide after losing the philosophical debate, are mythical because the context of these Purana-style poetic legends is mythical.

The questions about the iconography in the sanctum and the Bhairava relief outside remains unresolved. The cave temple as it has survived into the modern era only has Shaiva reliefs.

=== Inscription ===
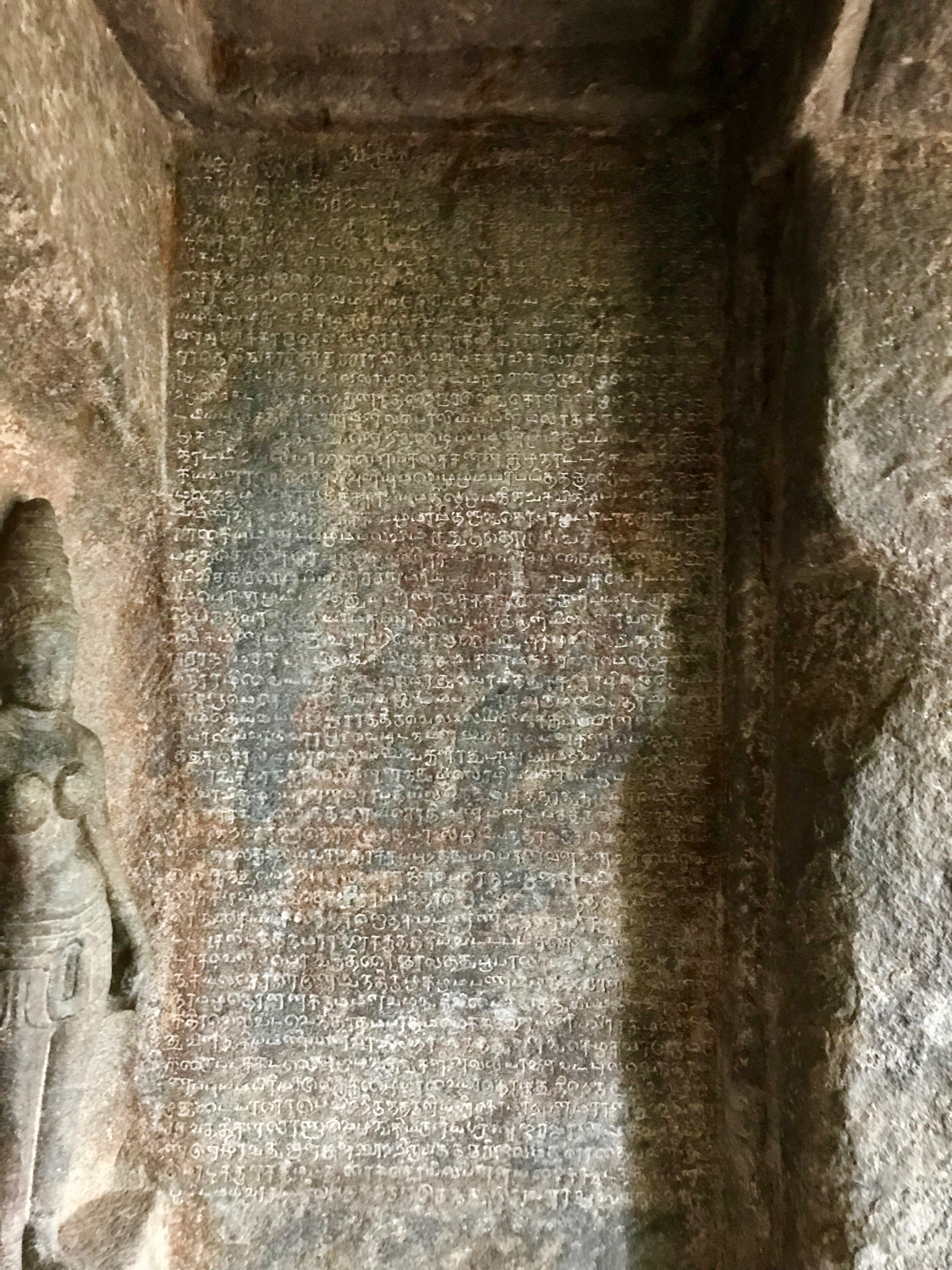
One of the inscriptions at the temple.

The east wall on the mandapa has a long inscription attributed to Maravarman Sundara Pandya (1216–1239 CE).

The inscription and its translation was first published by James Nelson in 1858, where he acknowledged the help of Hindu monks from a Shaiva monastery in Madurai who introduced it to him and guided him in the translation. Nelson then added his own commentary and speculations, which proved to be incorrect.

The inscription begins by invoking Vishnu with the Hindu goddesses Lakshmi and Bhumi Devi (earth), then Brahma and Saraswati, followed by allusions to Shiva who together help "virtues flourish in this world". It then praises the four Vedas, lists the Sanskrit arts and literature, and six sub-divisions of the Shaiva tradition – Bhairava, Vama, Kalamukha, Mahavrata, Pashupata and orthodox Saiva. The inscription includes gratitude to the Shaiva poet-saints, the major Tamil region rivers and of the north. Thereafter, it has a large section praising the family of Sundara Pandya and him, his conquests and compare him to the virtues of Vishnu in his generosity. The inscription proceeds to the expansion and greatness of "this temple to the south of Thirupparankundram". There is no direct or implied mention of any Jaina temple or Jaina terms in the inscription. It adds that the king Sundara Pandya in his generosity has granted rent-free, tax-free land to the temple for its maintenance, supplies for the daily Pujei (Skt: Puja, prayers), and the survival of the Adisiva Brahmins associated with the temple. Thereafter, the inscription has a long list of 24 officials attesting as witness to the grant that shall last "till sun and moon shall last".

The inscription is notable for several reasons. First, its contents confirm that the temple was expanded and artwork was added in the 13th century. Second, the temple and its artwork must have been completely Shaiva and in good condition in the 13th century for the king to sponsor this inscription. Third, the details provided have been significant in helping date the chronology of Tamil dynasties.

== Gallery ==
Thirupparankundram cave, south side of the Skandamalai (rock hill)
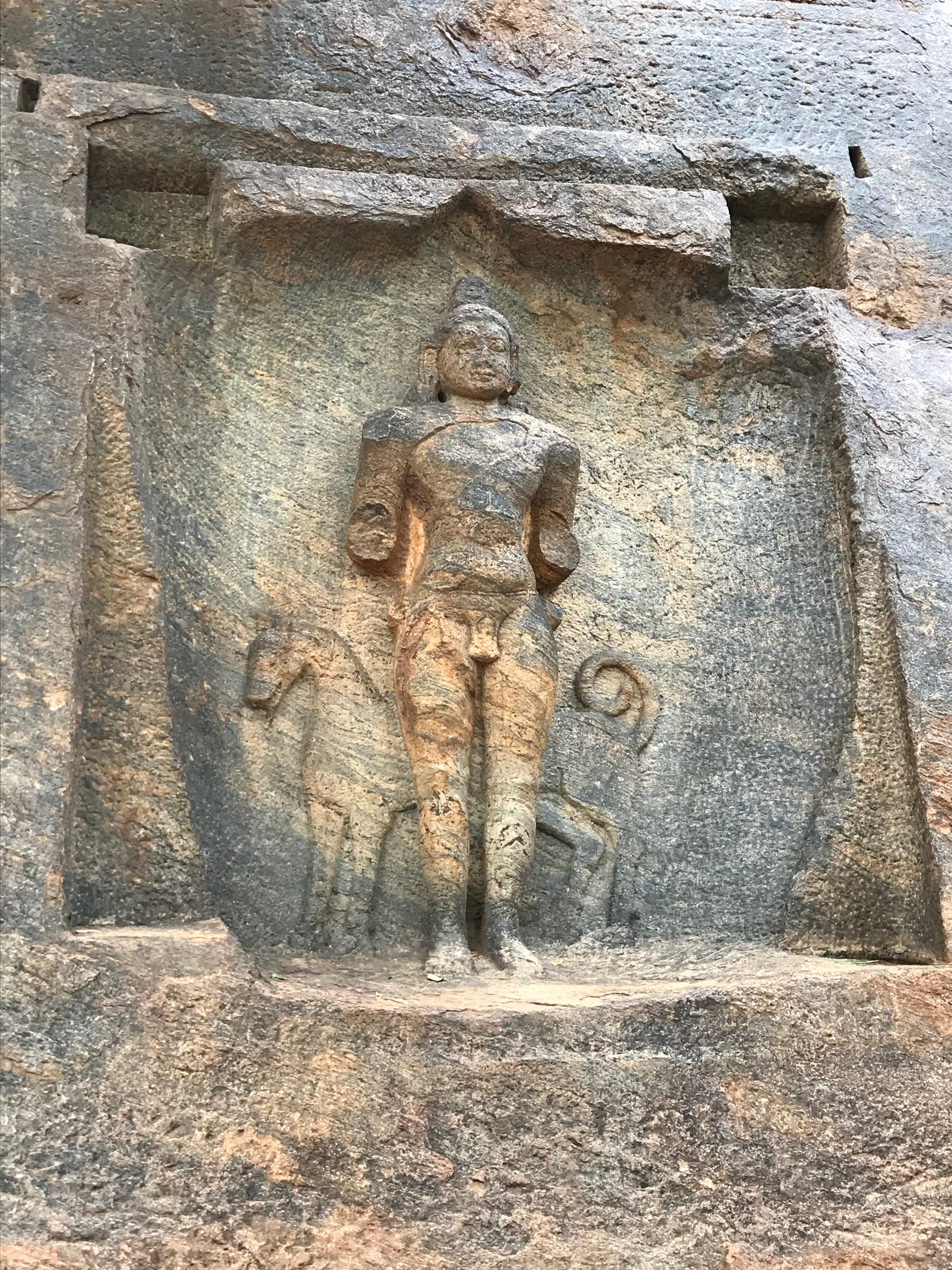
Bhairava with his dog, some iconography reminds of a Tirthankara

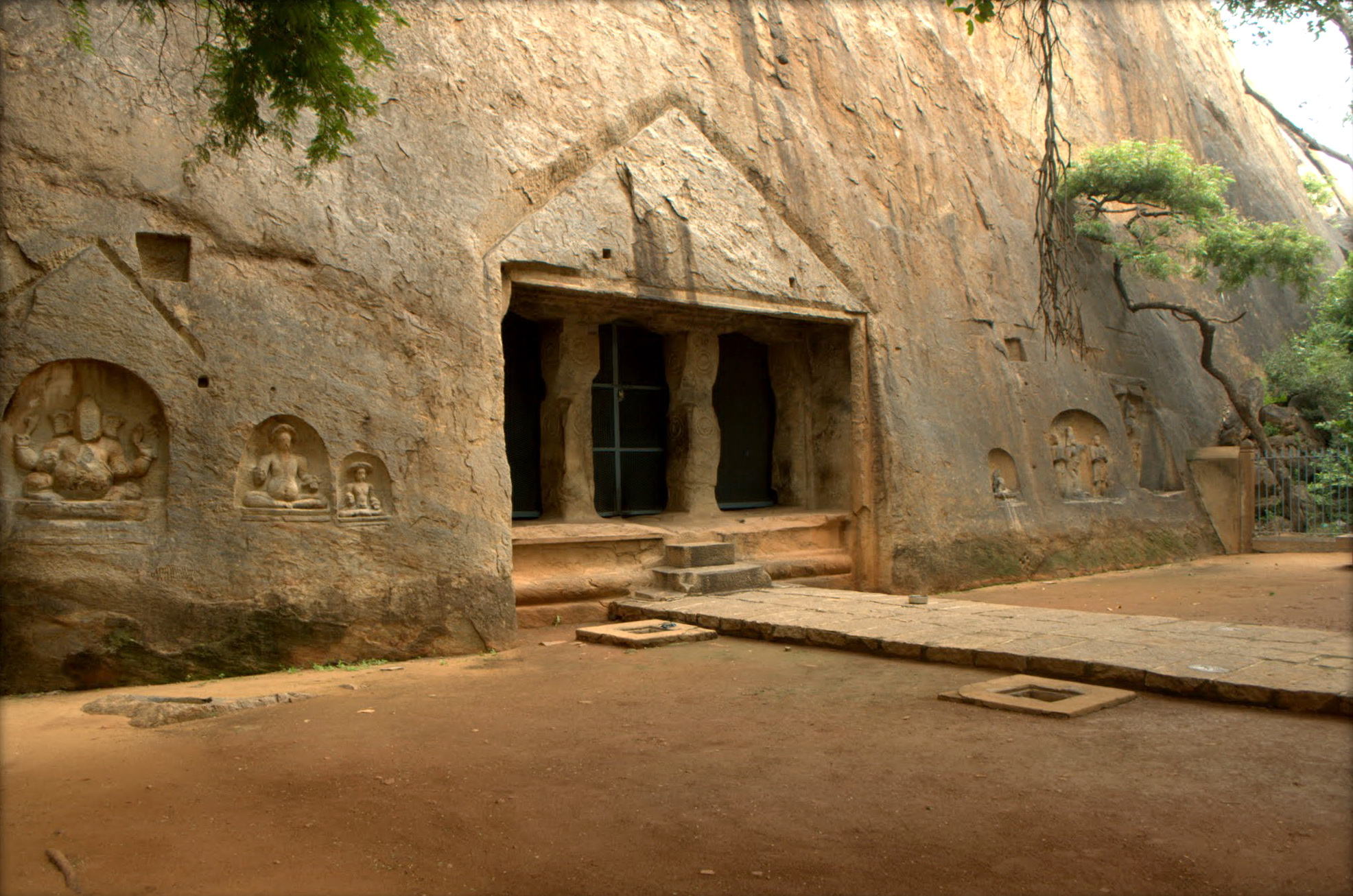
Another view of the Cave Temple

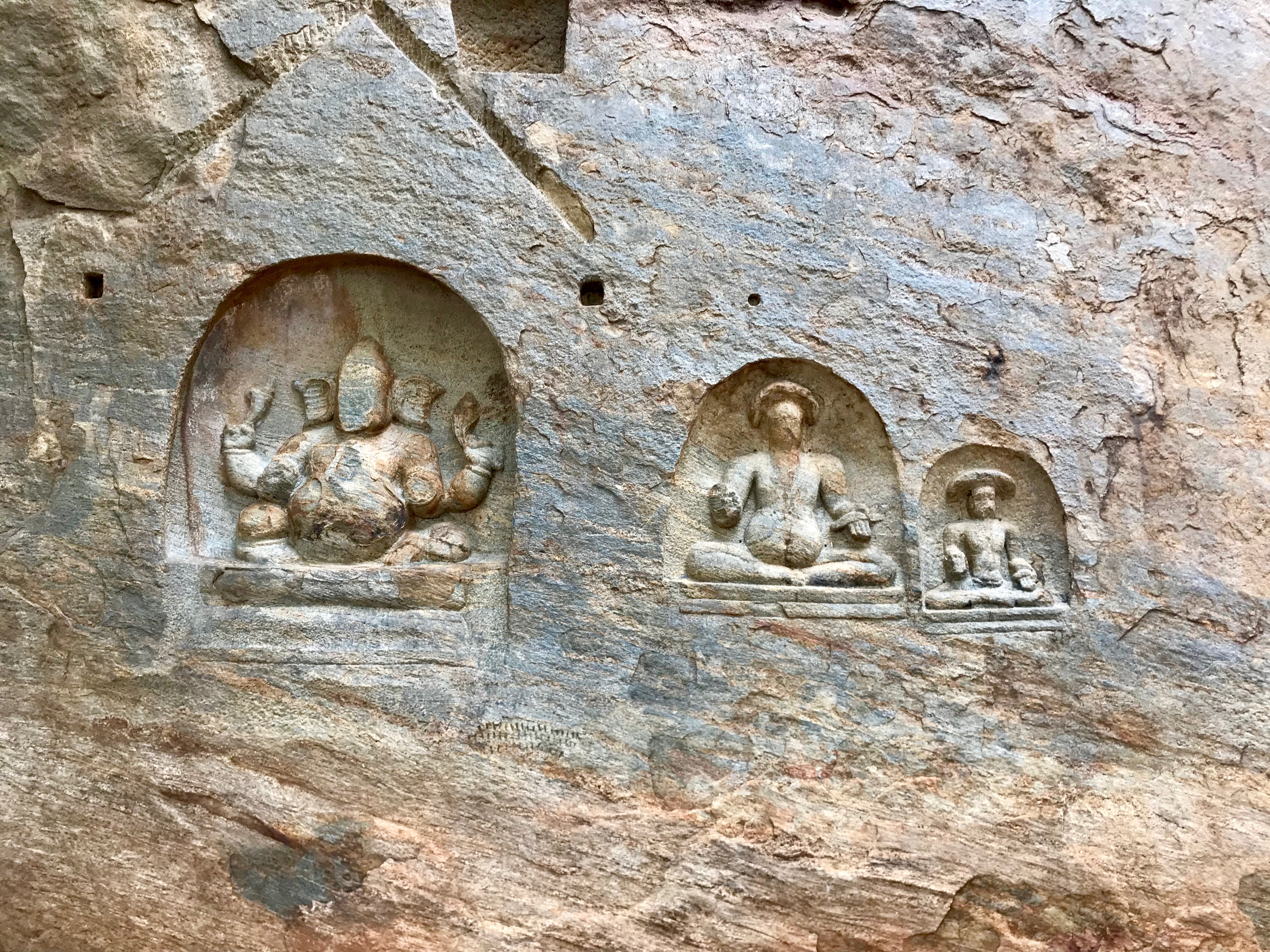
Bas-reliefs on the left side of cave temple entrance.

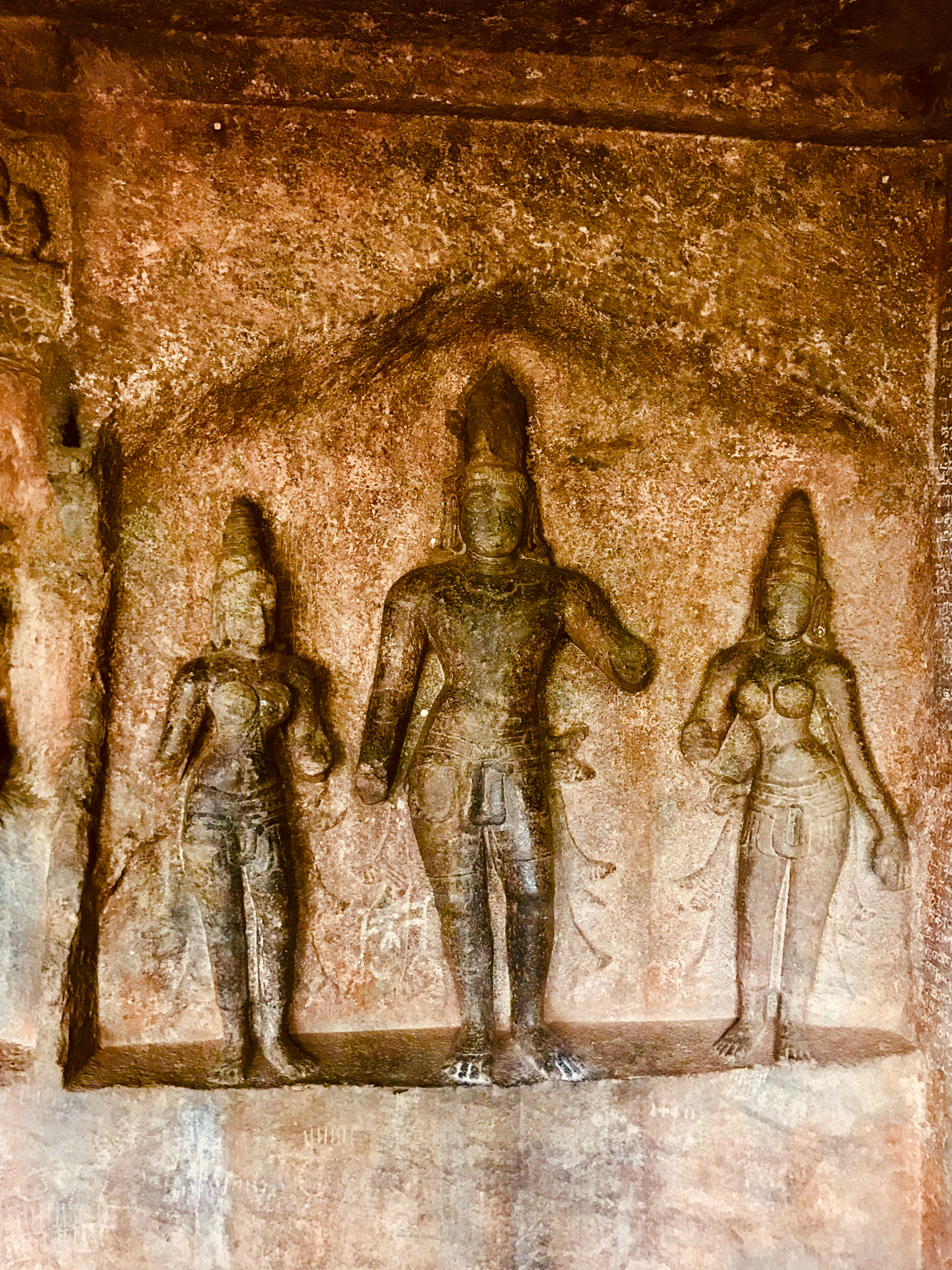
Damaged and defaced Skanda (or king) with two wives
