= Thirunadhikkara Cave Temple =

- Location in Tamil Nadu, India
- 8.3986°N 77.2977°E
- Location: Thirunanthikarai, Kanyakumari, India

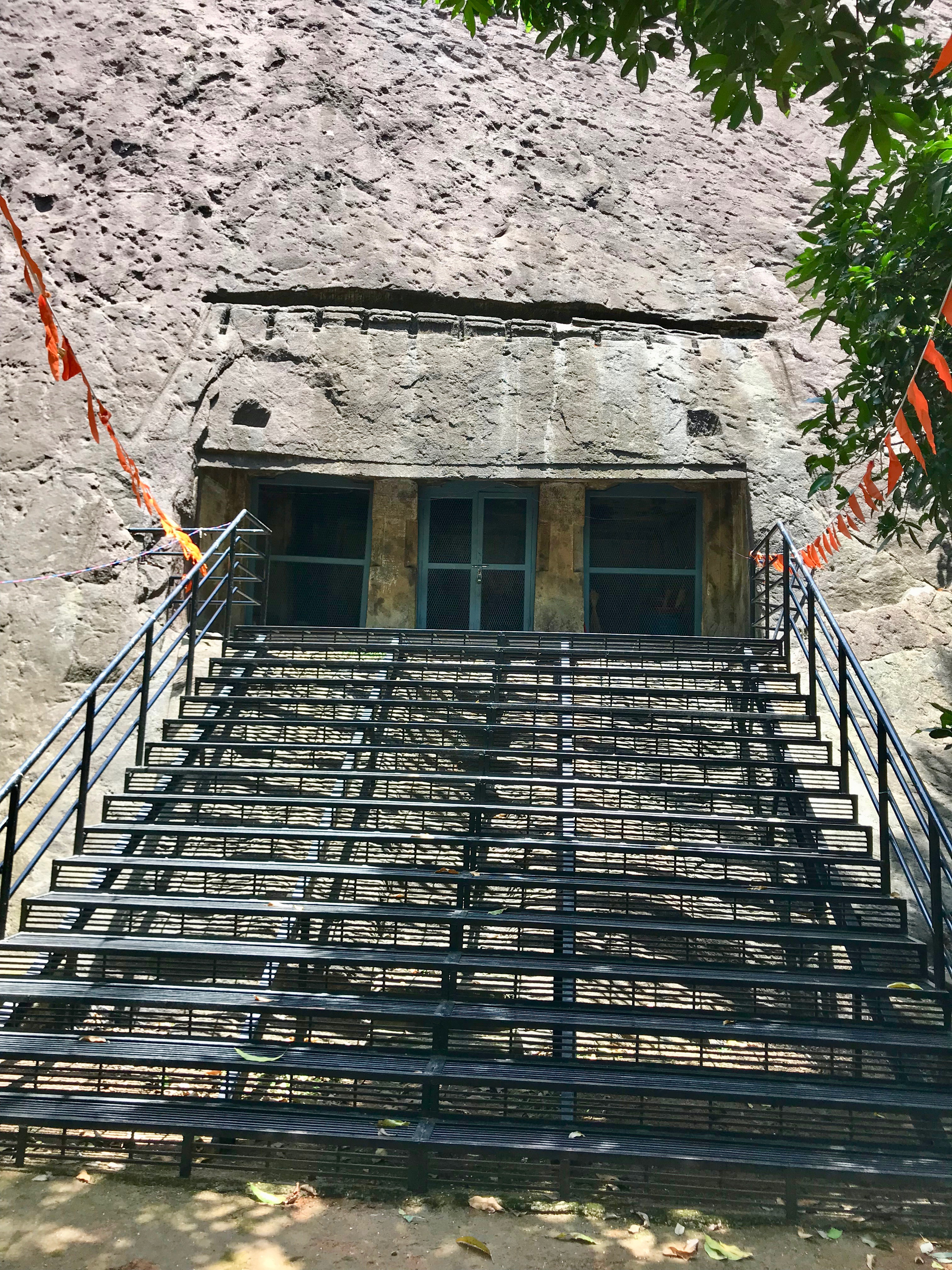
Thirunandikkara Temple

Thirunandikkara Cave Temple, also referred to as Thirunanthikarai rock-cut Shiva temple, is a 9th-century rock-cut Hindu cave temple in Kanyakumari district, Tamil Nadu, India. It is dedicated to Shiva, with murals and inscriptions. It is attributed to the Ay king Vikramaditya Varaguna by Archaeological Survey of India, but to Pandya rulers (Nedunjadaiyan) a few decades earlier by Ajit Kumar, an archaeologist. It is part of a larger active temple complex named the Thirunanthikarai Shri Nandeeswara temple, Thirunanthikarai and is carved out of the side of a rocky hillock to the north of the temple complex. According to Rao, one of the inscriptions suggests that this may be a late 8th-century cave temple or early 9th.

The square-plan temple consists of a mandapam and a small, slightly raised cell sanctum facing east. In the sanctum is a Shiva Linga. The mandapam has four Vatteluttu script inscriptions on the pillars and pilaster surface, as well as faded murals in the Kerala style. The inscriptions are in Tamil language and describe gifts made to the temple. The earliest inscription (c. 800 CE) mentions a donation to maintain the continuous lighting of a sacred lamp, pay for musicians (drummers) and offerings. The last inscription in this cave temple is from Chola era, and it too mentions a gift to maintain the perpetual lamp along with an autumn festival.

The most visible part of the mural is in the southwest corner showing Ganesha in red outline with a devotee making offerings and palace scenes. The more eroded frescoes show a Vaishnava theme of Narasimha (half lion, half man Vishnu avatar) with a female devotee. The ceiling has a faded painting of lotus and nature, somewhat reminiscent of the Sittannavasal cave. The frescoes or murals in this cave temple represent the early stages of Kerala style of murals in a Hindu temple. Thus, although this temple is now a part of Tamil Nadu, it incorporates the historic Kerala Tranvancore heritage of this region.

The Thirunadhikkara Cave Temple is a protected monument (N-TN-T5) and managed by ASI, Thrissur circle.

== Gallery ==
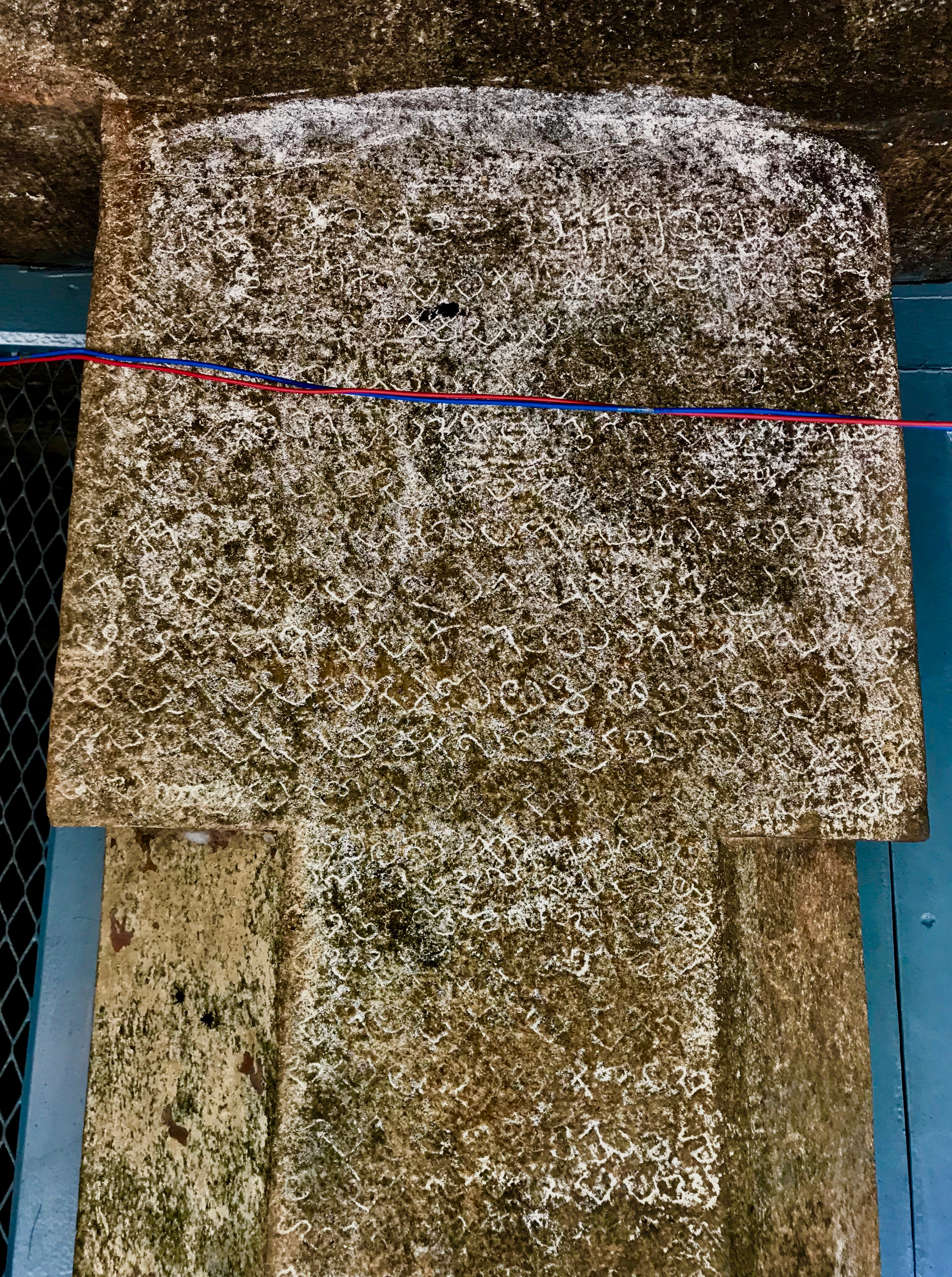
Pillar 1 inscription at the Cave temple

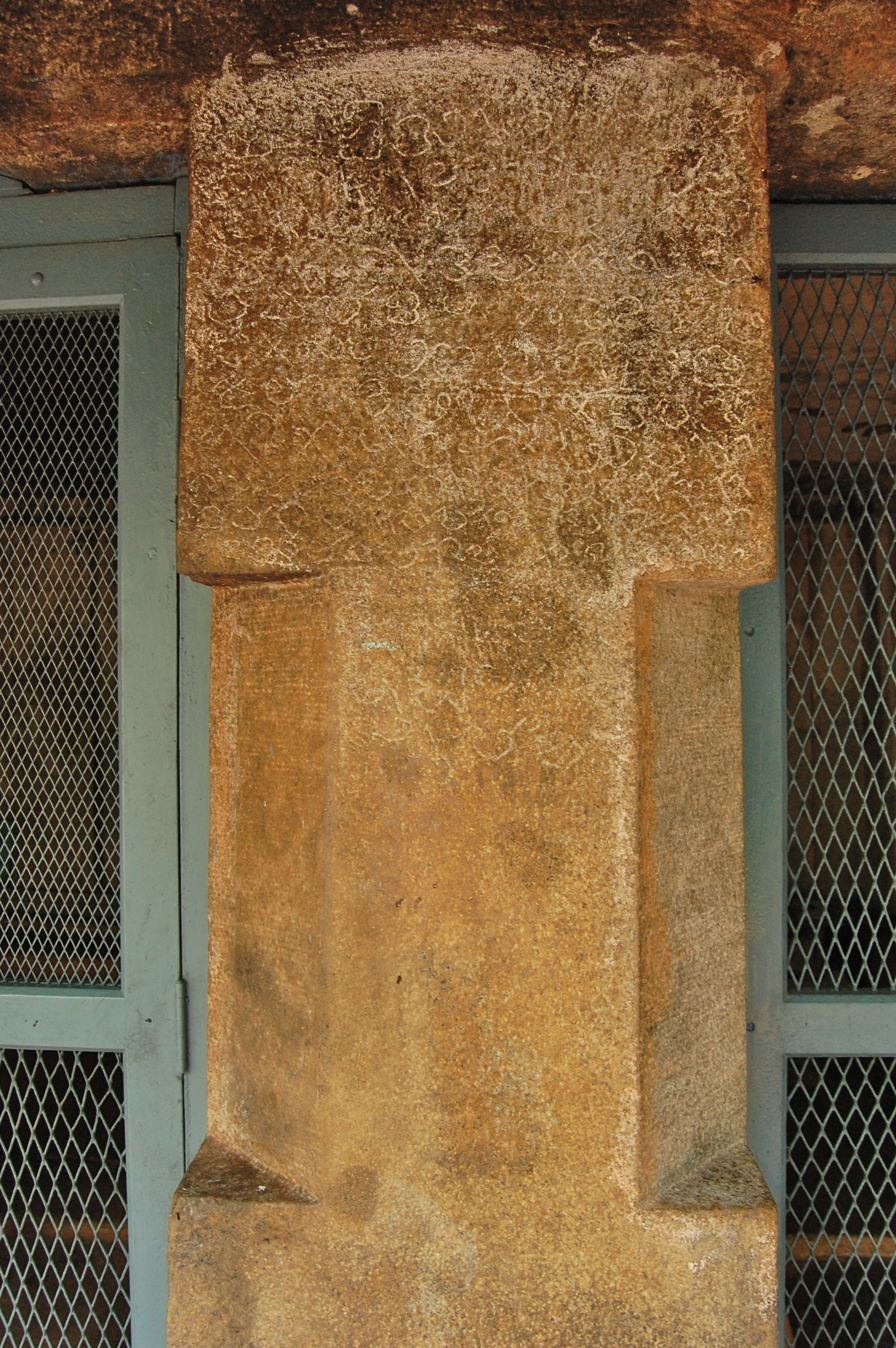
Pillar 2 inscription

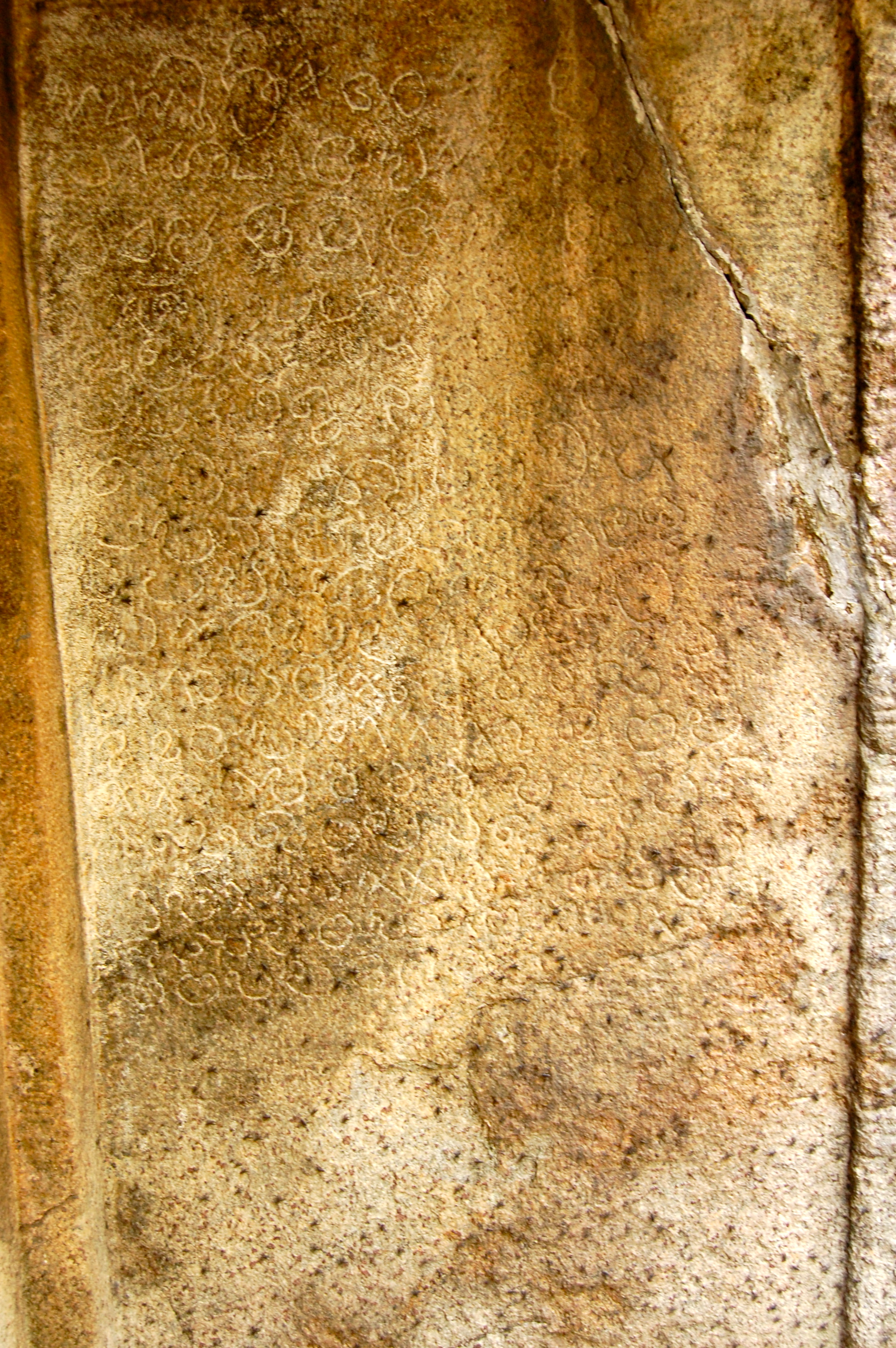
Inscription on the entrance pilaster

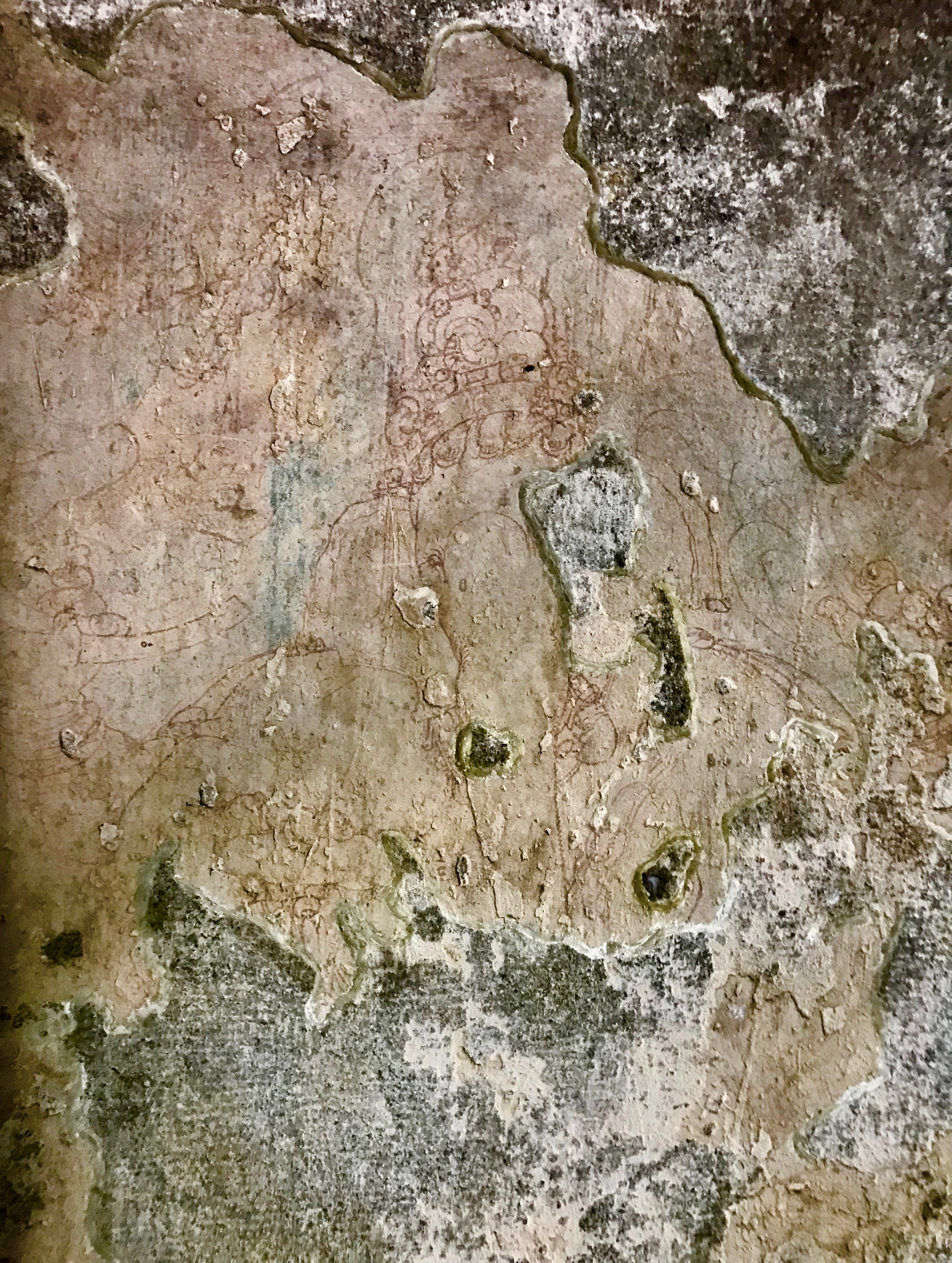
Faded Ganesha mural

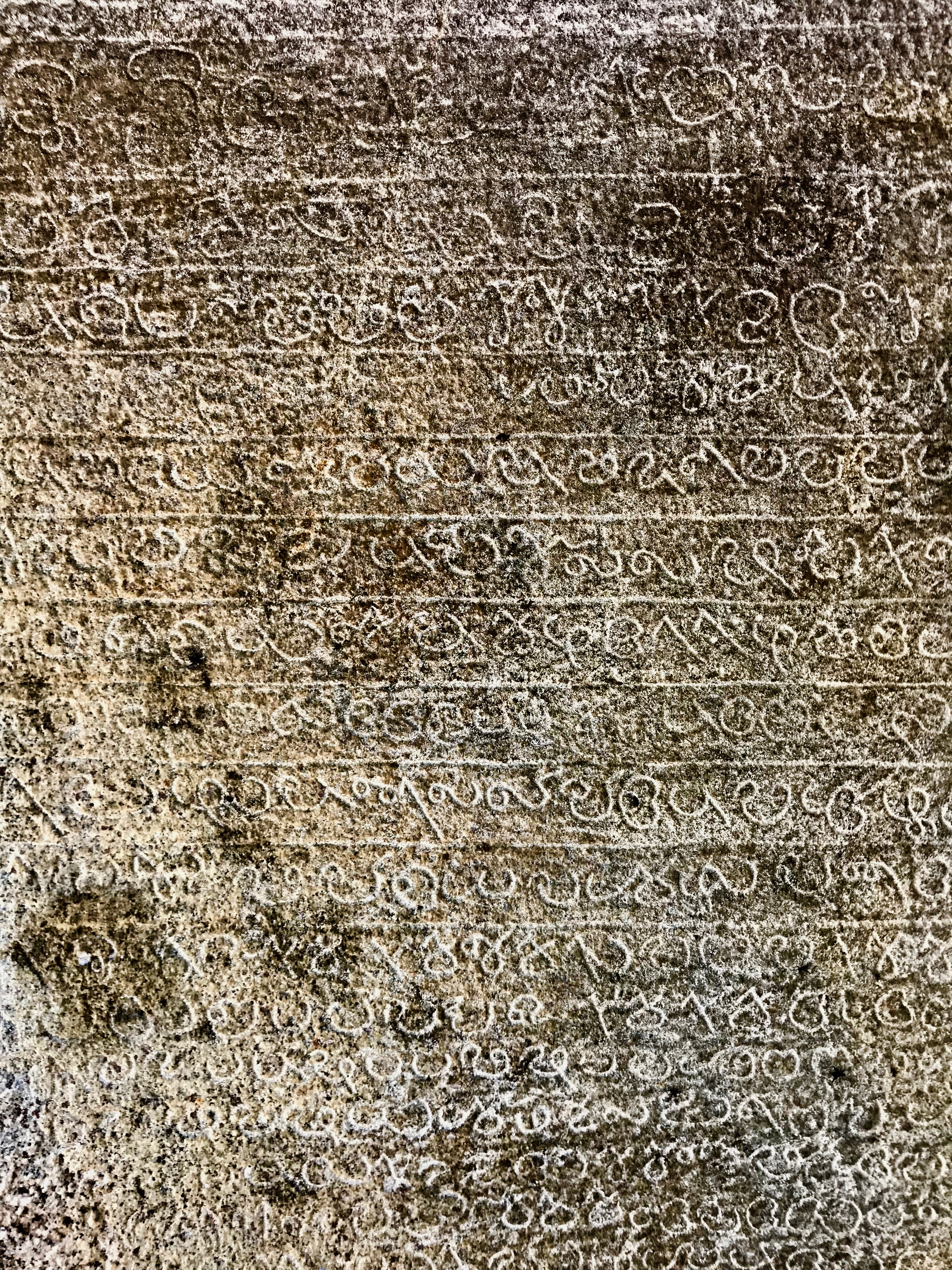
A Vatteluthu inscription in the temple

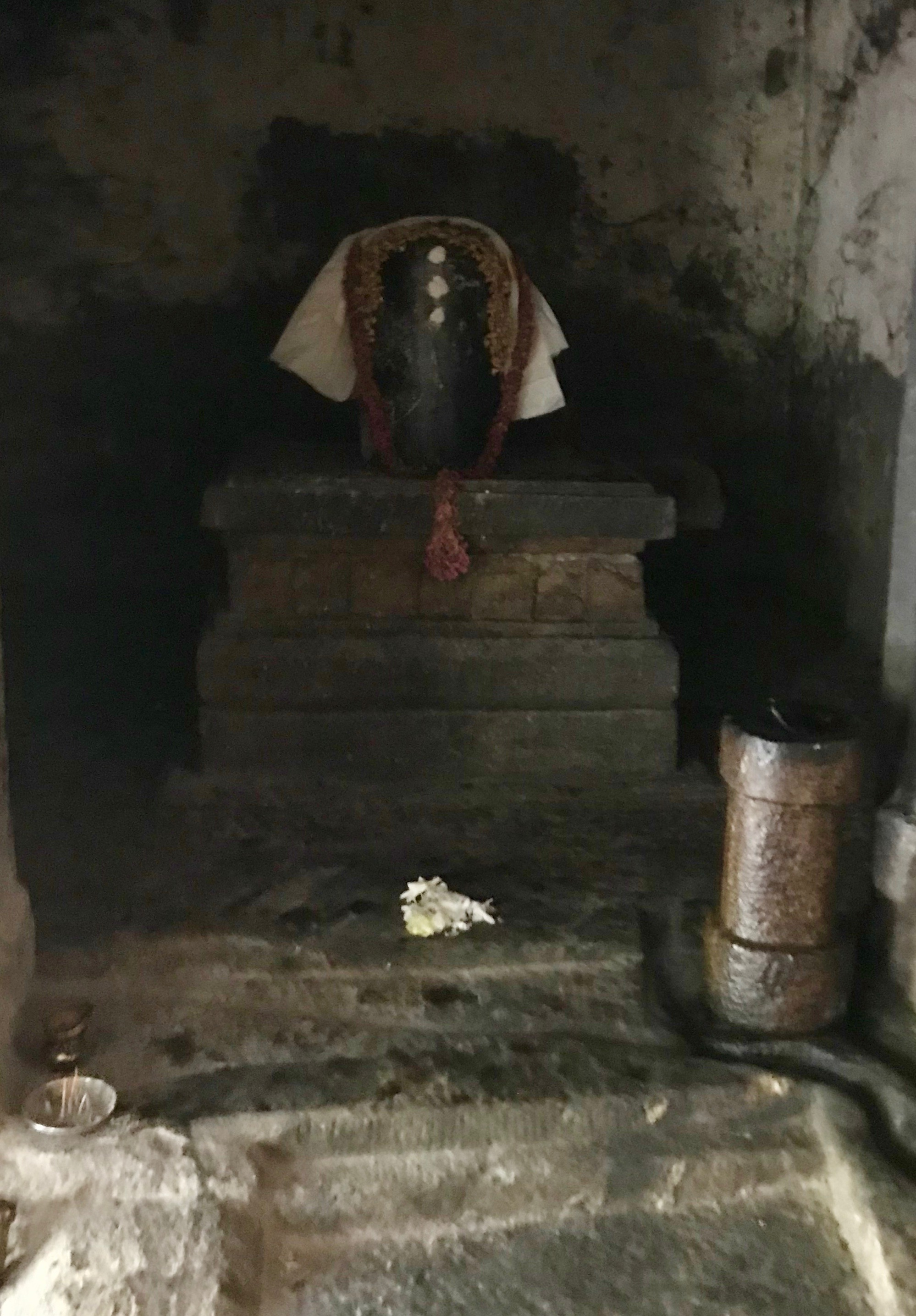
Shiva Linga in the sanctum
