= Vahisvaramudayar Temple, Malayadipatti =

Hindu temple in Tamil Nadu, India

Vahisvaramudayar Temple is a Hindu temple dedicated to the deity Shiva, located at Malayadippatti in Kulathur taluk of Pudukkottai district in Tamil Nadu, India.

== Location ==
This cave temple is located at a distance of 33 km from Pudukottai, in Killukkottai.

== Cave temples ==
In Malayadippatti, two cave temples are found. While one is devoted for Shiva another is devoted for Vishnu. This is a twin temple. Shiva temple is known as Vahisvaramudayar Temple and Vishnu temple is known as Pallikonda Perumal Temple.

== Presiding deity ==
The presiding deity is known as Vahisvaramudayar. The goddess is known as Periyanlayaki.

== Specialities ==
In one cave both Shiva and Vishnu Temples are found. This is Shiva temple. In this temple inscription of Nandivarma Pallava, 775-826 C.E., is found. From this inscription it is learnt that this temple was built around 730 C.E. by Kuvaavan Satthan who is also known as Vitel Vidugu Muttharayan.

== Puja ==
Pujas are held four times daily at Kalasanthi (7.00 a.m.), Uttchikkalam (noon 12.00), Sayaratchai (6.00 p.m.) and arthajamam (8.30 p.m.).The temple is opened for worship from 6.00 to 12.00 noon and 5.00 to 8.00 p.m.
