= Devarmalai =

Kathir Narasinga Perumal temple in Devar Mala or Devarmalai is a five-centuries-old Hindu shrine. This temple is famous for its legend, which goes back to Hiranya Samhara.

After Hiranya Samharam, the ferocious Narasimha, came to the forest area of Devar Malai, where he was intercepted by the Devas who had congregated in large numbers. In an effort to calm him down, the Devas brought sacred water and performed abishekam for Narasimha.

Pleased with the gesture, Lord Narasimha provided darshan in a majestic seated posture (veera asana pose) with his right feet placed on the ground and the left leg in a folded position. His left hand is positioned as if He is inviting the devotees (Aghwana Hastham) while His right is in abhaya hastham posture blessing them. The Sacred water (Brahma Theertham) here is believed to liberate those with Brahma Hathi dosham. The perumal is known as Kathir narasimhar which means Jwala Narashimhar, because he is in an angry mood. There is a komuhi or water source behind the temple, where the water from unknown source comes through a mouth.

== Special features ==
1. Veerasana Kolam of Lord Narasimha.
2. Moolavar: Kathir Narasinga Perumal facing east in a sitting posture
3. Goddess: Kamalavalli Thaayar in a separate sannidhi
4. The first of the ‘Palayams’ of the Nayaks.
5. Several ancient inscriptions are found at the entrance to the Thaayar sannidhi.
6. Moolavar idol is believed to be over 1,000 years old.

== Special events ==
1. 10-day Brahmotsavam in the month of Vaikasi (mid-May to mid-June).
2. Navarathri kolu for Kamalavalli Thaayar.
3. Chakkarai pongal presented to Sri Lakshmi Narayana every Monday.
4. Special abishekam on ashtami to swarna akharshana bhairavar.
5. Panakam neivedhyam done everyday to Swami
6. Special Abhishegam on every Swati nakshatram
