= Kunnandarkoil Cave Temple =

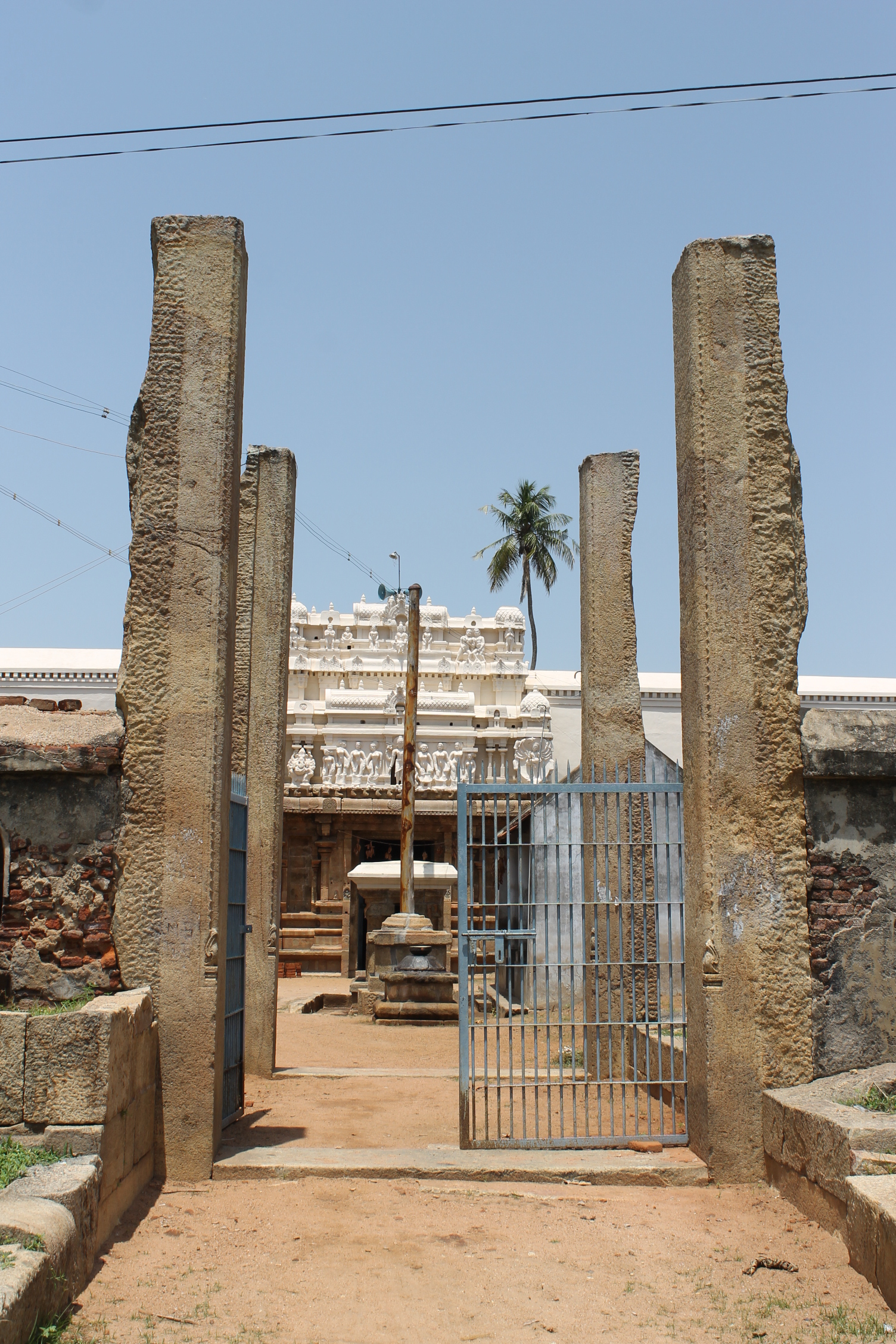

- Location in Tamil Nadu

Religion
- Affiliation: Hinduism
- District: Pudukottai
- Deity: Shiva

Location
- Location: Kunnandarkoil
- State: Tamil Nadu
- Country: India
- Interactive map of Kunnandarkoil Cave Temple
- Coordinates: 10°34′56″N 78°53′50″E

Architecture
- Type: Rock-cut architecture
- Completed: 8th century

Kunnandarkoil Cave Temple in Kunnandarkoil, a village in Pudukottai district in the South Indian state of Tamil Nadu, is dedicated to the Hindu god Shiva. Constructed in Rock-cut architecture, the temple is believed to have been built during the 8th century by Muttaraiyar kings, the cardinals of Pallavas, with later expansion from the Vijayanagar Empire. The rock-cut architecture in the temple is a specimen of the late Pallava Art and an early example of Chola Art. The temple has various inscriptions from Cholas, Chalukyas, Pandyas and Vijayanagar Empire. The temple is considered one of the oldest stone temples in South India. The temple is maintained and administered by Department of Archaeological Survey of India as a protected monument.

== History ==
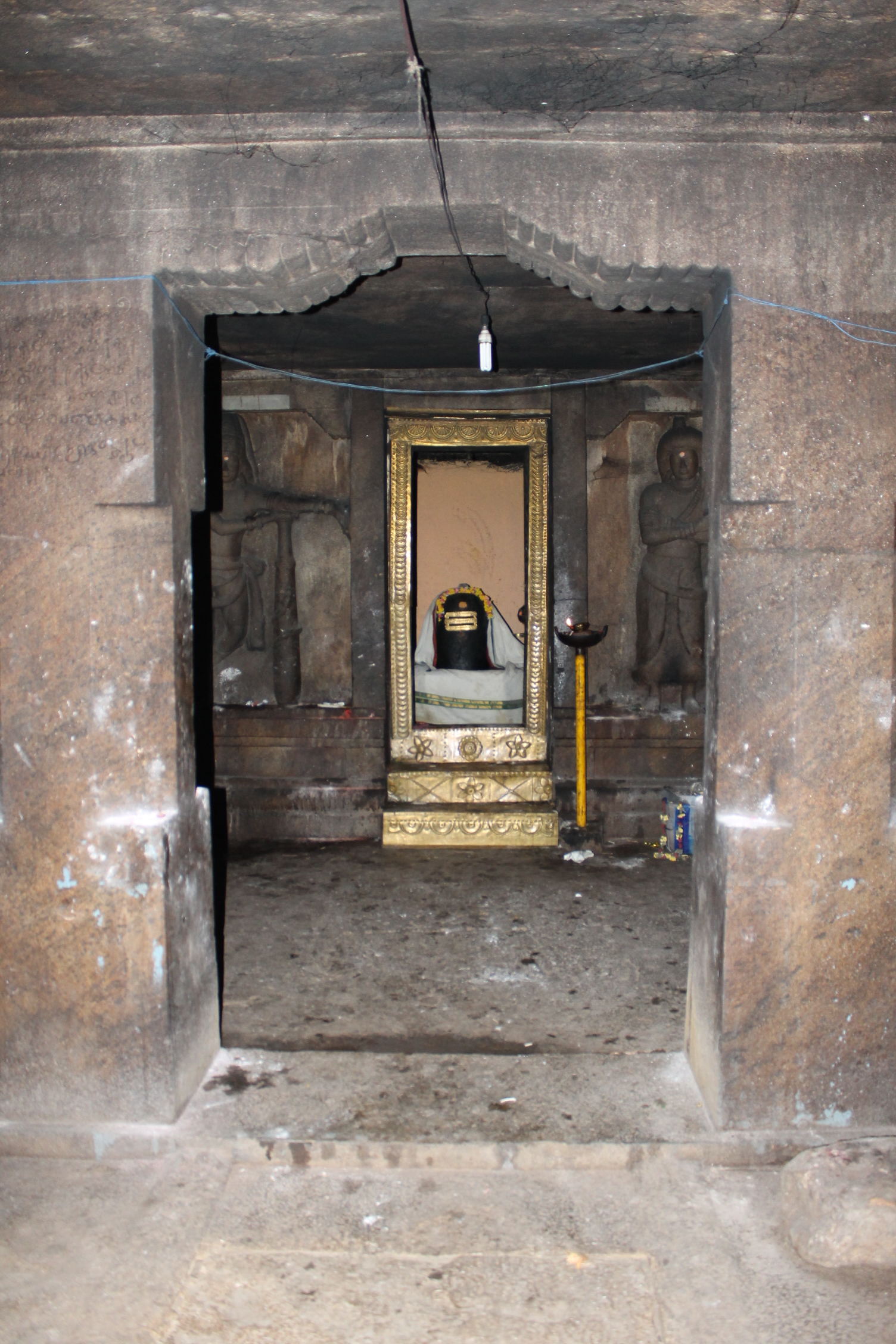
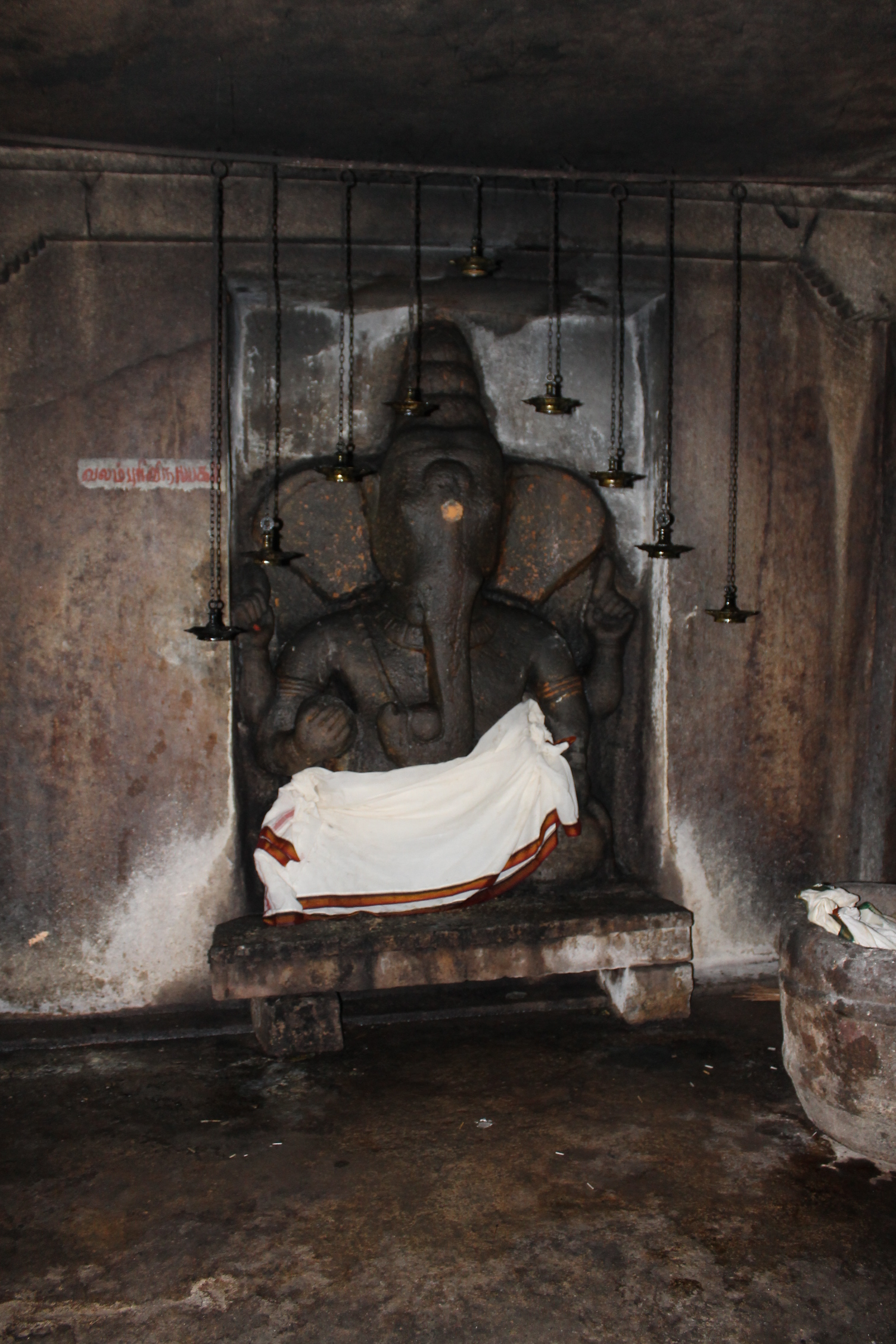
Image of Shiva and Vinayaga in the temple

Kunnandarkoil derives its name from Kundru-Andan-Koil meaning the Lord of the hill in the temple. Kunnandarkoil and the region around it was ruled by the Mutharaiyars during the 7th to 9th centuries, where were lieutenants under the Pallavas. The region was later captured by Medieval Cholas. The cave temple was originally built by Muttaraiyar king who was the lieutenant of the Pallava king Nandivarman II (710-775 CE), who was also called Nandivarman Pallava Malla. The earliest inscription is from the period of Nandivarman and his son Dantivarman indicating generous contribution to Vedic people (learned) during the Thiruvadirai festival. Soundara Rajan identifies the temple to an addition during the early half of the 8th century. There are later inscriptions from Cholas, Chalukyas, Pandyas and Vijayanagar Empire. During the 14th century, the village had two divisions for the Kallar community. Some of the epigraphic studies reveal that there were strict punishments levied to people robbing in remote villages like Kunnandarkoil.

In modern times, the temple is maintained and administered by Department of Archaeological Survey of India as a protected monument.

== Architecture ==
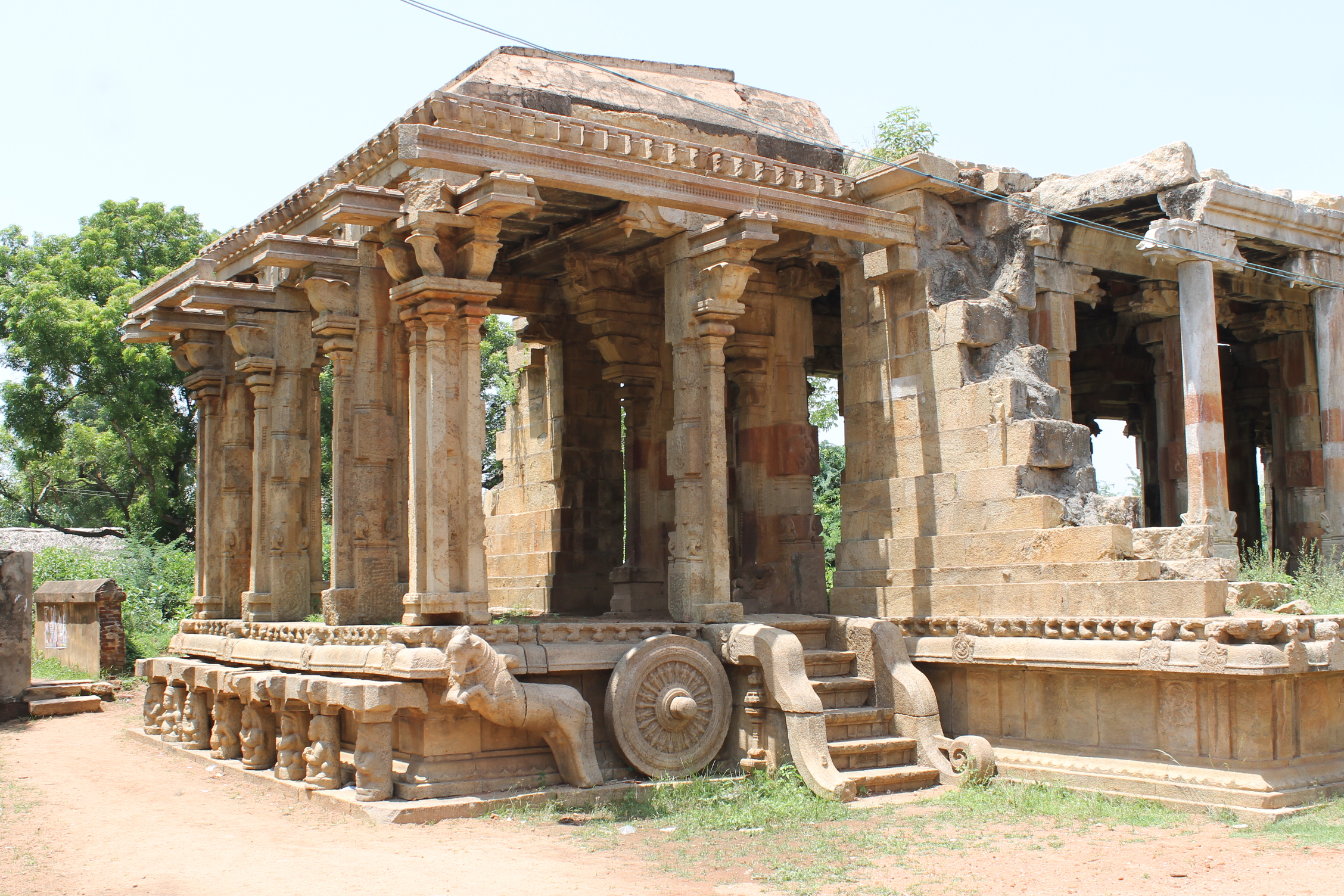
The hall of hundred pillars

The temple is located in Kunnandarkoil, a rockyhill in Pudukottai district in southern Tamil Nadu. The cave houses three life size sculptures of various forms of Shiva. The main shrine faces East and the sanctum houses the image of Lingam, an iconic representation of Shiva. Shiva is worshipped as Parvathagiriswarar. The walls of the sanctum are plain, unlike later Chola temples that have niches to house different images. The sanctum is approached through an Arthamandapa, a hall supported by pillars. The sanctum is guarded by Dvarapalas on either sides. The inscriptions are made on the base of the Dvarapalas. There are two portrait images, one of which is identified as the Mutharaiyar chief who built the temple and other being his assistant.

== Significance ==
The temple in rock-cut architecture is an early example of Cholan Art, continuing the tradition of the Pallavas. The individual images retrieved from the place are maintained in the Pudukottia Government Museum. The hundred pillared Nrita Mandapa has sculpted pillars, a typical of Vijayanaagar art. The bronze images in temple are earliest specimen of exquisite sculpted images in South Indian art. The Somaskanda bronze with Shiva and Parvathi, with their child Skanda is the most prominent among the bronzes in the temple.
