= Pallikonda Perumal Temple, Malayadippatti =

Hindu temple in Tamil Nadu, India

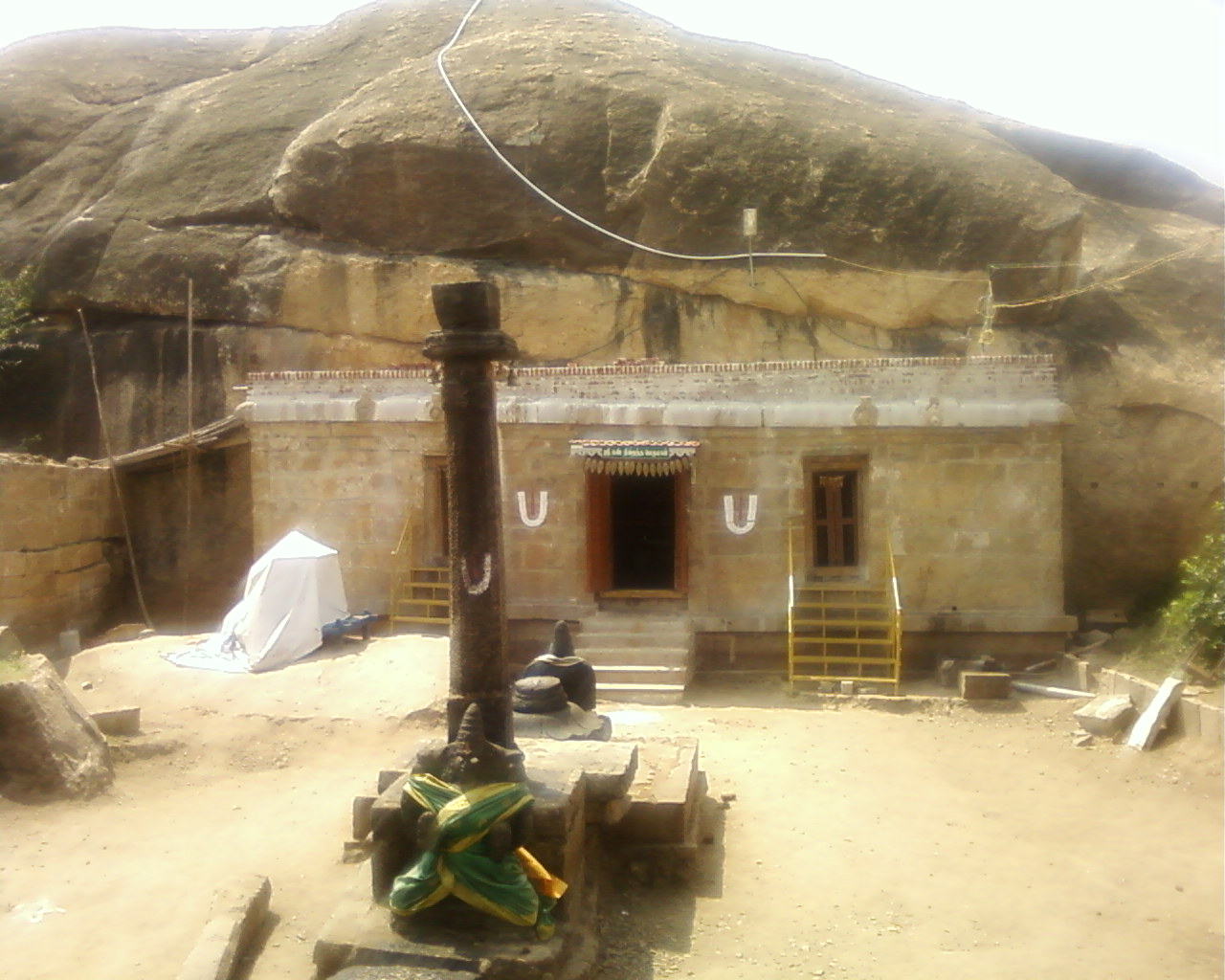
Pallikonda Perumal Temple, Malayadippatti

Pallikonda Perumal Temple is a Hindu temple dedicated to the deity Vishnu, located at Malayadippatti in Kulathur taluk of Pudukkottai district in Tamil Nadu, India. This is a small village and one of the important rock cut temples of Pudukkottai district such as Thirumayam Rock cut temple. The Dvarapala's have only 2 hands unlike the other Dvarapala's who have 4 hands in other Vishnu temples.

== Location ==
This cave temple is located at a distance of 33 km from Pudukottai, in Killukkottai.

== Legend ==
Legend, says that Dhivakara Maharishi performed penance in this place so that Maha Vishnu will shover his blessings to him. He also wanted lord to recede in this place as Archa roopam so that people of Kali Yuga can offer prayers. He is called as Kannniraintha perumal and is believed that he will cure eye related problems. This temple is taken care by ASI by Archaeological Survey of India. Lord vishnu is in Archa roopam which means the lord formed into a statue for the devotees.

== Cave temples ==
In Malayadippatti, two cave temples are found. While one is devoted for Shiva another is devoted for Vishnu. This is a twin temple. Shiva temple is known as Vahisvaramudayar Temple and Vishnu temple is known as Pallikonda Perumal Temple. This temple meant for Vishnu is known as Kan Thirantha Perumal Temple.

== Presiding deity ==
The deity, in reclining posture, is known as Pallikonda Perumal. The Goddesses are Mahalakshmi and Boodevi.

== Specialities ==
In the west part of the Shiva cave, Vishnu cave is found. In this cave temple, Pallikonda Perumal is found, sculpted in the cave itself. From the inscriptions it is learnt that this temple belonged to 7-8th century CE. The presiding deity is found like the presiding deity found in Thirumayam cave temple.

== Puja ==
Pujas are held four times daily at Kalasanthi (7.00 a.m.), Uttchikkalam (noon 12.00), Sayaratchai (6.00 p.m.) and arthajamam (8.30 p.m.).The temple is opened for worship from 6.00 to 12.00 noon and 5.00 to 8.00 p.m.

== Gallery ==
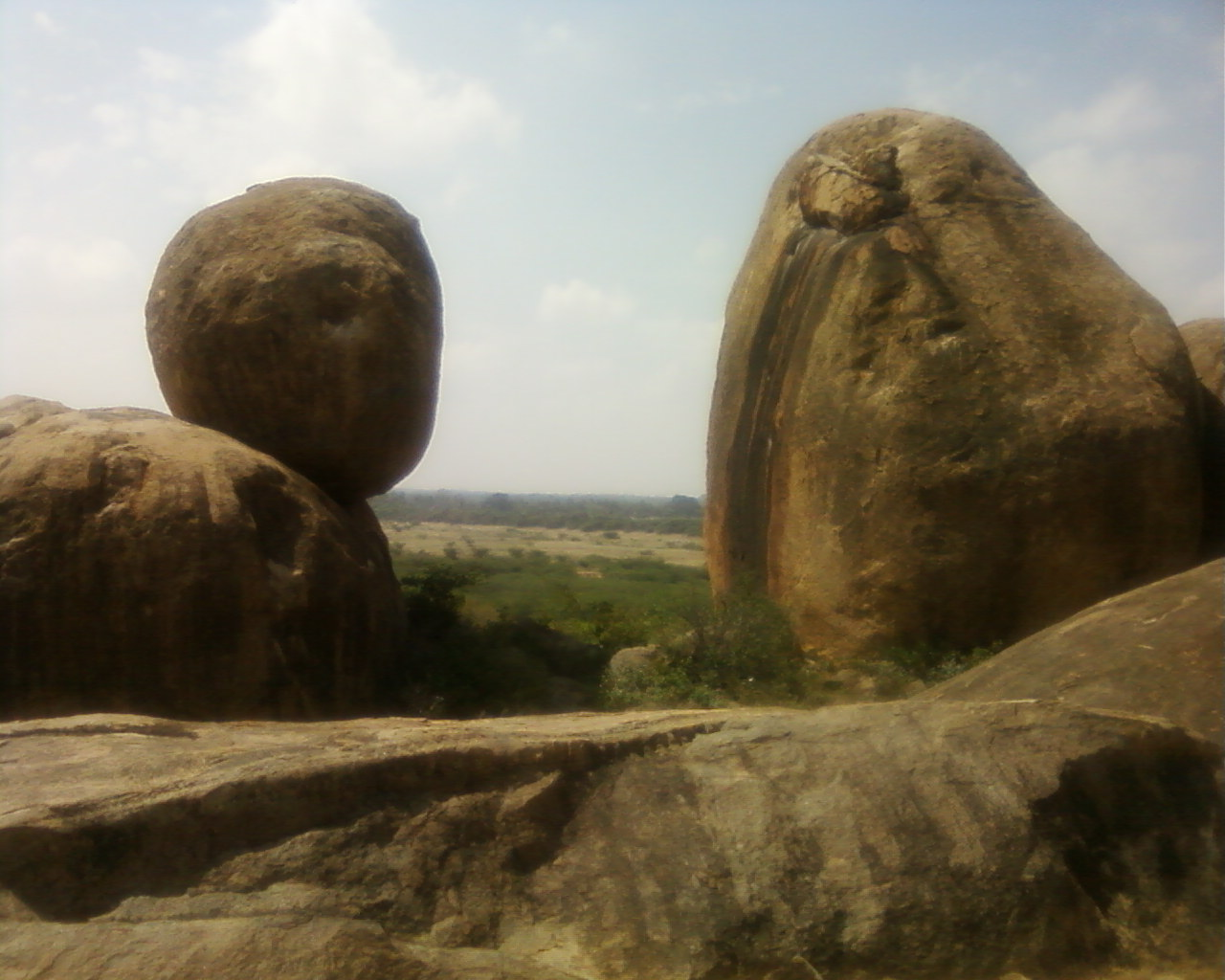

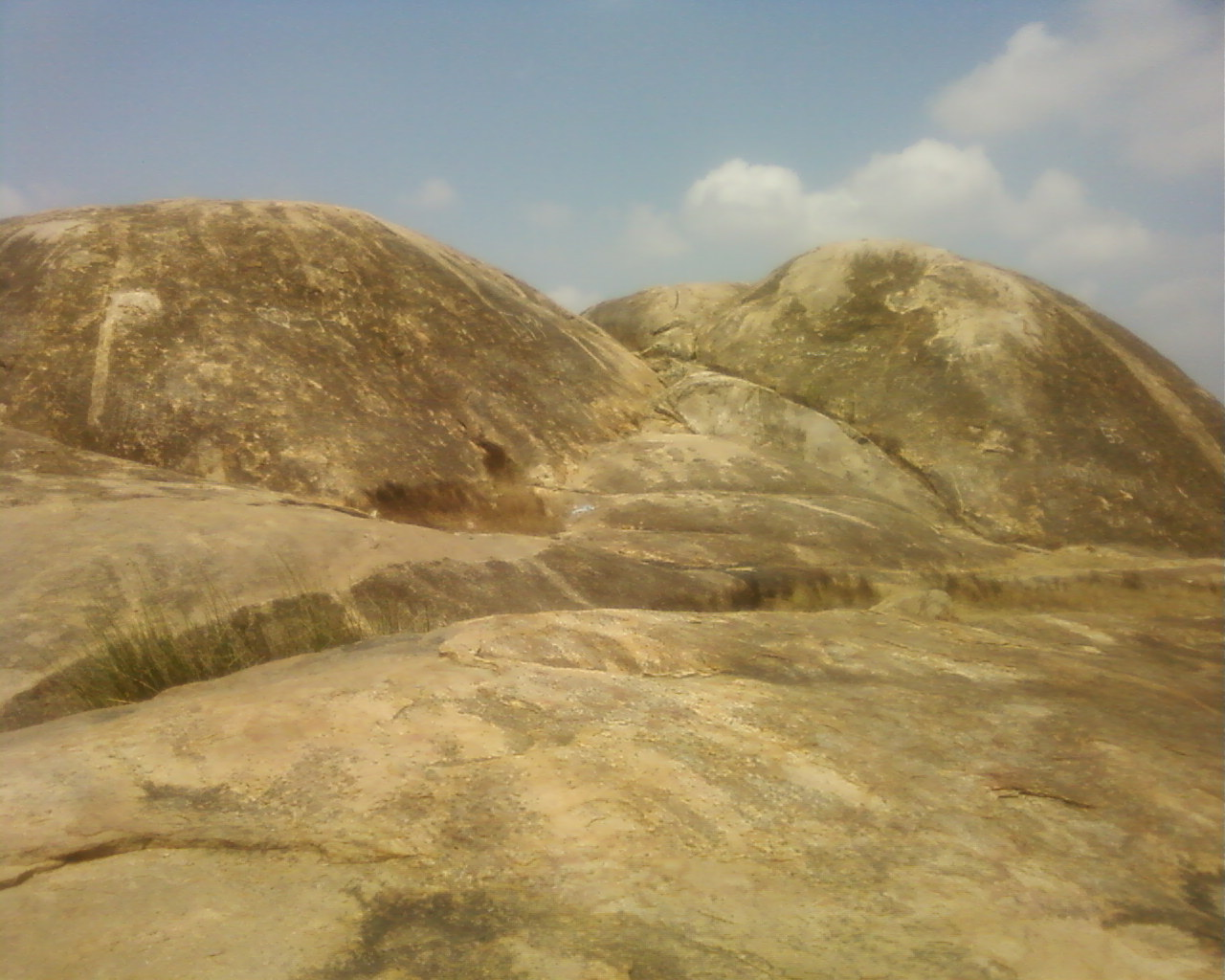
