= Sivaganga Park =

Sivaganga Park is a recreational park in the city of Thanjavur in Tamil Nadu, India. It adjoins the Brihadeeswarar Temple, a popular tourist destination.

== History ==
The Sivaganga Park was created as a people's park by the Tanjore municipality in 1871–72. It is situated to the east of the 11th century Brihadeeswarar Temple and encompasses the Sivaganga Tank believed to have been built by the Medieval Chola king Raja Raja Chola. In the initial days, the park was not maintained as the locality was overcrowded and ill-ventilated. However, the park is fairly maintained now. As a part of the makeover operations in the lead up to the 1994 World Tamil Conference, motor boating facilities were introduced in the Sivaganga Tank.

== Facilities ==
A toy train, motor boating facilities and a miniature zoological garden are located within the park. The Thanjavur Municipal Library is also situated within the precincts of the park.
