= List of State Protected Monuments in Tamil Nadu =

This list comprises State Protected Monuments officially reported by and available through the website of the Tamil Nadu State Department of Archaeology in the Indian state of Tamil Nadu. The monument identifier is numbering as published on the TNARCH website. The TNARCH has recognized 109 State Protected Monuments in Tamil Nadu. Additionally, the Monuments of National Importance in this state may also be of relevance.

== List of state protected monuments ==
SL. No.	Description	Location	Address	District	Coordinates	Image
S-TN-1	Memorial Pillar, Arasu Pannai	Saidapet		Chennai	13°01′33″N 80°13′50″E	Memorial Pillar, Arasu Pannai More images
S-TN-2	Sivankoil (Siva Kozhundeeshwarar Temple)	Sivankoodal		Kancheepuram	12°55′54″N 79°48′30″E	Upload Photo
S-TN-3	Mahadevar Koil	Edayarpakkam		Kancheepuram	12°59′08″N 79°46′53″E	Upload Photo
S-TN-4	Sivankoil (Raja Raja Choleshwar Mahadevar Temple)	Sivapuram		Kancheepuram	13°01′18″N 79°47′35″E	Upload Photo
S-TN-5	Vazhipokkar Mandapam	Thangi		Kancheepuram	12°48′12″N 79°46′36″E	Vazhipokkar Mandapam More images
S-TN-6	Tirulokvanatha Jeenaswamy Temple	Tiruparuthikunram		Kancheepuram	12°49′49″N 79°40′51″E	Tirulokvanatha Jeenaswamy Temple More images
S-TN-7	Chokkeeswarar Temple	Kancheepuram		Kancheepuram	12°50′26″N 79°42′15″E	Chokkeeswarar Temple More images
S-TN-8	Chandraprabha Temple	Tiruparuthikunram		Kancheepuram	12°49′52″N 79°40′51″E	Upload Photo
S-TN-9	Sivankoil (Vidya Vineetha Pallava Parameswarar Temple)	Kooram		Kancheepuram	12°54′30″N 79°39′28″E	Upload Photo
S-TN-10	Visaleeswarar Temple	Vilakkanampoondi		Tiruvallur	13°09′45″N 79°26′16″E	Upload Photo
S-TN-11	Tombs of Ceylon King	Vellore		Vellore	12°56′06″N 79°08′03″E	Tombs of Ceylon King More images
S-TN-12	Vandavasi Fort	Vandavasi		Tiruvannamalai	12°30′32″N 79°36′16″E	Vandavasi Fort More images
S-TN-13	Thadagapureeswarar Koil	Madam		Tiruvannamalai	12°26′49″N 79°26′29″E	Upload Photo
S-TN-14	Chinnavankulam	Chinniyampettai		Tiruvannamalai	12°05′39″N 78°48′21″E	Chinnavankulam More images
S-TN-15	Poondi Arugar Temple	Erumpedu		Tiruvannamalai	12°41′51″N 79°18′08″E	Upload Photo
S-TN-16	Gangaikonda choleeswarar Temple	Koolampandal		Tiruvannamalai	12°41′03″N 79°40′01″E	Upload Photo
S-TN-17	Sculpture Tank (Amma Kulam)	Kilravandavadi		Tiruvannamalai	12°09′39″N 78°56′08″E	Upload Photo
S-TN-18	Sivankoil (Thirunareeswarar Temple)	Kandamangalam		Villupuram	11°55′02″N 79°41′06″E	Sivankoil (Thirunareeswarar Temple)
S-TN-19	Rock Paintings	Settavarai		Villupuram	12°10′01″N 79°15′14″E	Rock Paintings More images
S-TN-20	Mukthmaleeswarar Koil and Seetha cave	Perumukkal		Villupuram	12°11′56″N 79°44′08″E	Upload Photo
S-TN-21	Tirumoolanathar Temple	Perangiyur		Villupuram	11°51′45″N 79°26′21″E	Tirumoolanathar Temple More images
S-TN-22	Rock Paintings	Kilvalai		Villupuram	12°01′53″N 79°19′59″E	Rock Paintings More images
S-TN-23	Rock Paintings	Alambadi		Villupuram	12°00′22″N 79°17′00″E	Rock Paintings More images
S-TN-24	Sivankoil (Kailayamudayar Sivan Temple)	Ulagapuram		Villupuram	12°09′50″N 79°46′24″E	Upload Photo
S-TN-25	Vishnu Koil (Devaraja Perumal Koil)	Ulagapuram		Villupuram	12°09′43″N 79°46′08″E	Upload Photo
S-TN-26	Tamizhi Inscriptions	Neganoor		Villupuram	12°17′20″N 79°26′14″E	Tamizhi Inscriptions
S-TN-27	Tamizhi Inscriptions & Jain Sculpture and Jain Beds	Thondur		Villupuram	12°20′51″N 79°28′26″E	Upload Photo
S-TN-28	Rudrapathi Temple	Keelakadambur		Cuddalore	11°14′22″N 79°32′05″E	Upload Photo
S-TN-29	Kadambavaneswarar koil	Erumbur		Cuddalore	11°27′35″N 79°31′11″E	Upload Photo
S-TN-30	Rockpool and Brahmi Inscriptions	Periyerippatti		Salem	11°43′51″N 77°59′37″E	Upload Photo
S-TN-31	Ancient Paintings	Vettaikkaranmalai		Coimbatore		Upload Photo
S-TN-32	Kalinga Sculptures	Chengamedu		Ariyalur	11°12′07″N 79°28′28″E	Kalinga Sculptures More images
S-TN-33	Maligaimedu	Ulkottai		Ariyalur	11°12′00″N 79°26′16″E	Maligaimedu More images
S-TN-34	Erattaikoil (Agateeswaram and Choleeswaram Temple)	Keelaiyur		Ariyalur	11°02′33″N 79°02′30″E	Erattaikoil (Agateeswaram and Choleeswaram Temple) More images
S-TN-35	Elephant Statue	Elaiyaperumal Nallur		Ariyalur	11°14′51″N 79°26′45″E	Elephant Statue More images
S-TN-36	Swastika Well	Thiruvallarai		Tiruchirappalli	10°57′13″N 78°40′01″E	Swastika Well More images
S-TN-37	Sivankoil (Kailasanathar Temple)	Alambakkam		Tiruchirappalli	10°55′35″N 78°57′43″E	Upload Photo
S-TN-38	Sivankoil (Metraleeswarar Temple)	Alagiamanavalam (Gopurapatti)		Tiruchirappalli	10°54′17″N 78°39′51″E	Upload Photo
S-TN-39	Pachil Amaleeswarar Sivankoil	Alagiamanavalam		Tiruchirappalli	10°54′17″N 78°40′15″E	Pachil Amaleeswarar Sivankoil More images
S-TN-40	Agastheeswarar koil	Perungudi		Tiruchirappalli	10°49′25″N 78°38′15″E	Agastheeswarar koil More images
S-TN-41	Sivankoil (Sundareshwarar Temple)	Pazhur		Tiruchirappalli	10°51′55″N 78°38′27″E	Upload Photo
S-TN-42	Kailayamudaiyar Koil	Sholamadevi		Tiruchirappalli	10°45′48″N 78°46′16″E	Kailayamudaiyar Koil
S-TN-43	Jagadevi Fort	Krishnagiri		Krishnagiri	12°28′38″N 78°19′02″E	Upload Photo
S-TN-44	Inscription and Rock Bed	Velayuthampalayam		Karur	11°04′27″N 77°59′58″E	Upload Photo
S-TN-45	Amaravathy river bed	Thanthoni		Karur	10°57′45″N 78°05′34″E	Amaravathy river bed More images
S-TN-46	Dutch Tombs	Nagapattinam		Nagapattinam	10°45′19″N 79°50′51″E	Upload Photo
S-TN-47	Thanjavur Palace	Thanjavur		Thanjavur	10°47′29″N 79°08′10″E	Thanjavur Palace More images
S-TN-48	Sadayar koil (Thiruchadaimudi Mahadevar Temple)	Tiruchanampoondi		Thanjavur	10°50′57″N 78°53′31″E	Upload Photo
S-TN-49	Giant granary	Tiruppallathurai		Thanjavur	10°55′52″N 79°16′14″E	Giant granary More images
S-TN-50	Manora	Sarabendrarajanpattinam		Thanjavur	10°16′08″N 79°18′18″E	Manora More images
S-TN-51	Naganathaswamy Temple	Manambadi		Thanjavur	11°03′49″N 79°25′14″E	Naganathaswamy Temple More images
S-TN-52	Tirumal Naicker Palace	Madurai		Madurai	9°54′54″N 78°07′26″E	Tirumal Naicker Palace More images
S-TN-53	Paththu Thungal	Madurai		Madurai	9°55′00″N 78°07′24″E	Paththu Thungal More images
S-TN-54	Theerthangarar Sculptures	Yanaimalai		Madurai	9°57′50″N 78°11′11″E	Theerthangarar Sculptures More images
S-TN-55	Brahmi Kalvettugal	Yanaimalai		Madurai	9°57′50″N 78°11′11″E	Brahmi Kalvettugal More images
S-TN-56	Ladan koil	Yanaimalai		Madurai	9°57′59″N 78°11′21″E	Ladan koil More images
S-TN-57	Kovalanpottal	Madakulam		Madurai	9°54′12″N 78°05′59″E	Upload Photo
S-TN-58	Kalvettup Padukkaigal & Murugan koil	Varichiyur		Madurai	9°54′11″N 78°15′13″E	Upload Photo
S-TN-59	Asthagiriswarar koil	Varichiyur		Madurai	9°54′12″N 78°15′11″E	Upload Photo
S-TN-60	Udayagiriswarar koil	Varichurmalai (Kunnaththur)		Madurai	9°54′12″N 78°15′07″E	Upload Photo
S-TN-61	Brahmi Kalvethu	Kongarapuliyankulam		Madurai	9°56′44″N 77°59′22″E	Brahmi Kalvethu More images
S-TN-62	Sivankoil	Arittapatti		Madurai	10°02′25″N 78°16′36″E	Sivankoil More images
S-TN-63	Sivankoil (Kotteesuwaramudaiyar Sivan Temple)	Ayyapatti (Tharkakudi)		Madurai	10°12′15″N 78°21′51″E	Upload Photo
S-TN-64	Thirumalai Naicker Mandapam	A.Valayapatti		Madurai	10°04′21″N 78°12′54″E	Upload Photo
S-TN-65	Ovamalai Kalvettu, Mangulam	Meenakshipuram		Madurai	10°01′17″N 78°15′32″E	Ovamalai Kalvettu, Mangulam More images
S-TN-66	Tiruvadavur Kalvettu	Thiruvathavur		Madurai	9°56′43″N 78°18′09″E	Upload Photo
S-TN-67	Karungalakkudi Kalvettu	Karungalakudi		Madurai	10°09′22″N 78°22′09″E	Upload Photo
S-TN-68	Tamizhi Inscriptions and Theerthangara Sculpture	Arittapatti		Madurai	10°02′41″N 78°16′42″E	Tamizhi Inscriptions and Theerthangara Sculpture More images
S-TN-69	Jain Beds & Cave and Brahmi Inscription	Mudalaikkulam		Madurai	9°59′23″N 77°56′05″E	Upload Photo
S-TN-70	Early Pandiya Kalvettup Padukkai	Ramnathapuram		Dindigul	10°23′27″N 78°05′13″E	Upload Photo
S-TN-71	Kungaikoil Chinna Ivarmalai Sculptures	Thathanaickenpatti		Dindigul	10°28′35″N 77°24′16″E	Upload Photo
S-TN-72	Ramalinga Vilasam	Ramanathapuram		Ramanathapuram	9°22′16″N 78°49′38″E	Ramalinga Vilasam More images
S-TN-73	Kamudi Kottai	Kamuthi		Ramanathapuram	9°24′53″N 78°22′32″E	Upload Photo
S-TN-74	Marudupandiyan Fort	Aranmanai Siruvayal		Sivagangai	9°57′34″N 78°39′23″E	Marudupandiyan Fort More images
S-TN-75	Rock Art & Tamil Brahmi Inscriptions & Jain Beds & Cave Temple and Vattezhuththu Inscriptions	Thirumalai		Sivagangai	9°59′23″N 78°28′15″E	Upload Photo
S-TN-76	Urn Burial Site and Habitation Sites	Kondhagai and Agaram Village in Kalugarkadai Revenue Village		Sivagangai		Urn Burial Site and Habitation Sites More images
S-TN-77	Early Pandiya period Sivalingam and Vinayaka Cave Temple	Mahibalanpatti		Sivagangai	10°11′19″N 78°33′52″E	Early Pandiya period Sivalingam and Vinayaka Cave Temple More images
S-TN-78	Remains of Kattabomman Fort	Panchalankurichi		Thoothukudi	8°56′00″N 78°02′04″E	Remains of Kattabomman Fort More images
S-TN-79	British Tombs (44)	Panchalankurichi		Thoothukudi	8°56′32″N 78°01′29″E	British Tombs (44) More images
S-TN-80	British Tombs (5)	Ottapidaram		Thoothukudi	8°55′08″N 78°01′25″E	British Tombs (5) More images
S-TN-81	Vettuvan Koil	Kalugumalai		Thoothukudi	9°09′11″N 77°42′15″E	Vettuvan Koil More images
S-TN-82	Iron Age Grave Yard	Sivagalai		Thoothukudi	8°38′46″N 77°58′04″E	Iron Age Grave Yard More images
S-TN-83	Poolai Udaiyar Kalvettu	Seevalaperi		Tirunelveli	8°48′27″N 77°50′35″E	Poolai Udaiyar Kalvettu More images
S-TN-84	Iranyankudiyiruppu	Rajakhalmankalam		Tirunelveli	8°25′51″N 77°39′49″E	Upload Photo
S-TN-85	Tiruneelakandar Temple	Pananjadi		Tirunelveli	8°44′31″N 77°28′00″E	Tiruneelakandar Temple More images
S-TN-86	Early Pandiya period Andhichi Rock cave Temple	Pathinalamperi		Tirunelveli	8°49′20″N 77°47′29″E	Early Pandiya period Andhichi Rock cave Temple More images
S-TN-87	Udayagiri Fort De Lennoy tomb	Padmanabhapuram		Kanyakumari	8°14′24″N 77°20′18″E	Udayagiri Fort De Lennoy tomb More images
S-TN-88	Vazhipokkar Mandapam	Pappanam		Virudhunagar	9°40′50″N 78°08′24″E	Vazhipokkar Mandapam More images
S-TN-89	Cave Temple (Velliyambalanathar Temple)	Paraikulam		Virudhunagar	9°32′02″N 78°10′57″E	Upload Photo
S-TN-90	Cave Temple (Malai Kozhundeeswarar temple)	Muvaraivenran		Virudhunagar	9°37′22″N 77°43′03″E	Cave Temple (Malai Kozhundeeswarar temple) More images
S-TN-91	Cave Temple	Kalarkuruchi (M.Puthupatti)		Virudhunagar	9°32′54″N 77°46′54″E	Upload Photo
S-TN-92	Cave Temple	Sevalpatti		Virudhunagar	9°18′25″N 77°42′52″E	Upload Photo
S-TN-93	Alambarai Fort	Alamparai		Chengalpattu	12°15′58″N 80°00′36″E	Alambarai Fort More images
S-TN-94	Karunguzhi Fort	Karunguzhi		Chengalpattu	12°31′43″N 79°54′09″E	Upload Photo
S-TN-95	Vittal Temple (Vittaleswarar Temple)	Vittalapuram		Chengalpattu	12°31′11″N 80°07′46″E	Upload Photo
S-TN-96	Karivartharaja Perumal Cave Temple Sivan Cave Temple and Vedhandheeswarar Cave Temple	Vallam		Chengalpattu	12°40′54″N 79°59′42″E	Upload Photo
S-TN-97	Jain Sculptures and Inscriptions	Ananthamangalam		Chengalpattu	12°20′06″N 79°39′57″E	Upload Photo
S-TN-98	Valleeswarar Temple	Thakkolam		Ranipet	13°01′32″N 79°43′47″E	Valleeswarar Temple More images
S-TN-99	Seven Mother's Sculptures	Perunkanchi		Ranipet	13°03′36″N 79°24′15″E	Seven Mother's Sculptures
S-TN-100	Kanja Sahib Tomb	Sholinghur		Ranipet	13°06′42″N 79°25′14″E	Kanja Sahib Tomb More images
S-TN-101	Armamalai Caves	Malayampattu		Tirupathur	12°45′44″N 78°38′33″E	Armamalai Caves More images
S-TN-102	Hill Fort	Thiagadurgam		Kallakurichi	11°44′13″N 79°04′31″E	Hill Fort More images
S-TN-103	Kabilar rocks	Pennaru (Tirukkoilur)		Kallakurichi	11°58′22″N 79°12′40″E	Kabilar rocks More images
S-TN-104	Brahmi Inscription	Jambai		Kallakurichi	12°00′57″N 79°03′43″E	Brahmi Inscription
S-TN-105	Jain Sculptures & Beds and Inscriptions	Cholapandiyapuram		Kallakurichi	11°53′04″N 79°07′35″E	Jain Sculptures & Beds and Inscriptions More images
S-TN-106	Megalithic Burial Sites	Pangunatham		Dharmapuri		Upload Photo
S-TN-107	Menhir (Standing stone)& Habitation Site and Megalithic Burial Sites	Kodumanal		Erode	11°06′46″N 77°31′25″E	Menhir (Standing stone)& Habitation Site and Megalithic Burial Sites
S-TN-108	Danish Fort	Sathangudi		Mayiladuthurai	11°01′29″N 79°51′23″E	Danish Fort More images
S-TN-109	Governor Maligai	Sathangudi		Mayiladuthurai	11°01′33″N 79°51′19″E	Governor Maligai More images

== See also ==
- List of State Protected Monuments in India for other State Protected Monuments in India
- List of Monuments of National Importance in Tamil Nadu
