= Tourism in Tamil Nadu =

Tamil Nadu is the southernmost state of India located on south-eastern coast of the Indian peninsula. The state is straddled by Western Ghats and Eastern Ghats to the west and north and the waters of Bay of Bengal and Andaman Sea on the other two sides. It is the home of the Tamil people, who speak Tamil language, one of the oldest surviving languages. The capital and largest city is Chennai which is known as the "Gateway to South India". As of 2021, the state is the most visited and has received the most number of tourists amongst all states of India.

Archaeological evidence points to Tamil Nadu being inhabited for more than 400 millennia and has more than 5,500 years of continuous cultural history. The Tamilakam region has been ruled over by many kingdoms, major of which are the Sangam era (300 BC–300 CE) rulers of the Cheras, Cholas, and Pandyas, the Pallava dynasty (3rd–9th century CE), and the later Vijayanagara Empire (14th–17th century CE) followed by European colonization from the 17th century till the Indian Independence in 1947. Hence, culture, cuisine and architecture have seen multiple influences over the years and have developed diversely. With its diverse culture and architecture, long coastline with beaches, dense forests and mountains of Western and Eastern ghats, Tamil Nadu has a robust tourism industry which contributes significantly to the GDP of the state.

Tamil Nadu Tourism Development Corporation was established by the Government of Tamil Nadu in 1971 and is the nodal agency responsible for the promotion of tourism and development of tourist related infrastructure in the state. The tag line "Enchanting Tamil Nadu" is used in the tourism promotions by Government of Tamil Nadu.

== Background and history ==
Historically, Tamil Nadu had been inhabited by hominids more than 400 millennia ago and has more than 5,500 years of continuous cultural history. Tamil Nadu is the home of the Tamil people, who speak the Tamil language, one of the oldest surviving languages. The Tamilakam region has been ruled over by many kingdoms, majority of which are the Sangam era (300 BC–AD 300) rulers of the Chera, Chola, and Pandya clans, the Pallava dynasty (3rd–9th century), and the later Vijayanagara Empire (14th–17th century). European colonization began with establishing trade ports in the 17th century, with the British controlling much of the territory for two centuries before the Indian Independence in 1947. When India became independent in 1947, erstwhile Madras presidency became Madras State, comprising present-day Tamil Nadu and parts of other states which was subsequently split up along linguistic lines. In 1969, Madras State was renamed Tamil Nadu, meaning "Tamil country".

After independence, the economy of Tamil Nadu conformed to a socialist framework, with strict governmental control over private sector participation, foreign trade, and foreign direct investment. In the 1970s while the economy of Tamil Nadu consistently exceeded national average growth rates, due to reform-oriented economic policies and the tourism industry started to develop subsequently. In 1971, Government of Tamil Nadu established the Tamil Nadu Tourism Development Corporation, which is the nodal agency responsible for the promotion of tourism and development of tourist related infrastructure in the state. It is managed by the Tourism,Culture and Religious Endowments Department. The tag line "Enchanting Tamil Nadu" was adopted in the tourism promotions. In the 21st century, the state has been amongst the top destinations for domestic and international tourists. As of 2021, Tamil Nadu recorded the most tourist foot-falls.

== Culture and heritage ==
=== Clothing ===
Tamil women traditionally wear a sari, a garment that consists of a drape varying from 5 yards (4.6 m) to 9 yards (8.2 m) in length and 2 feet (0.61 m) to 4 feet (1.2 m) in breadth that is typically wrapped around the waist, with one end draped over the shoulder, baring the midriff, as according to Indian philosophy, the navel is considered as the source of life and creativity. Ancient Tamil poetry such as the Silappadhikaram, describes women in exquisite drapery or sari. Women wear colourful silk sarees on special occasions such as marriages. The men wear a dhoti, a 4.5 metres (15 ft) long, white rectangular piece of non-stitched cloth often bordered in brightly coloured stripes. It is usually wrapped around the waist and the legs and knotted at the waist. A colourful lungi with typical batik patterns is the most common form of male attire in the countryside. People in urban areas generally wear tailored clothing, and western dress is popular. Western-style school uniforms are worn by both boys and girls in schools, even in rural areas.

=== Cuisine ===
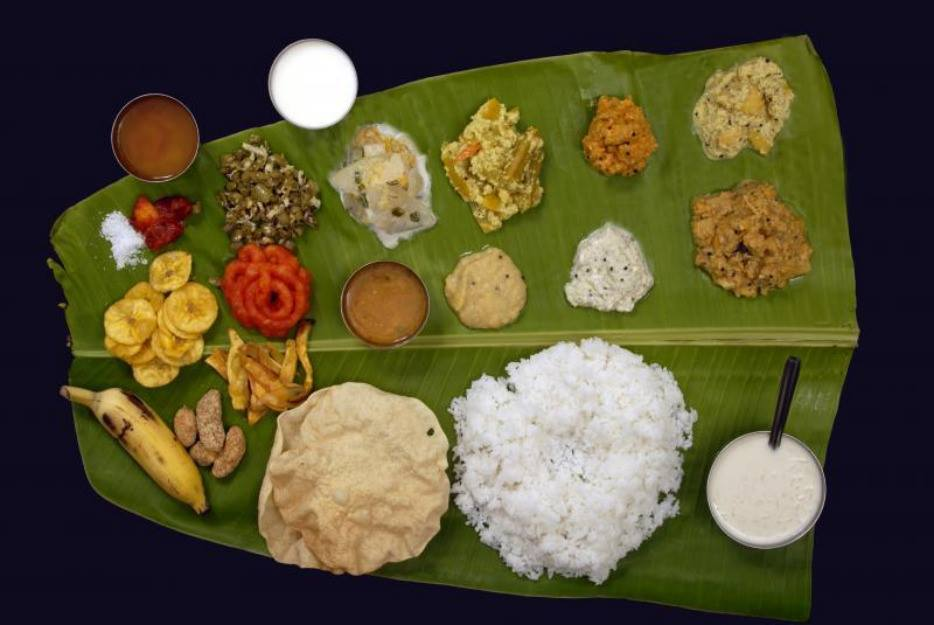
A traditional meal served on a banana leaf

Rice is the diet staple and is served with sambar, rasam, and poriyal as a part of a Tamil meal. Coconut and spices are used extensively in South Indian cuisine. The region has a rich cuisine involving both traditional non-vegetarian and vegetarian dishes comprising rice, legumes, and lentils. Its distinct aroma and flavour is achieved by the blending of flavourings and spices. The traditional way of eating a meal involves being seated on the floor, having the food served on a banana leaf, and using clean fingers of the right hand to take the food into the mouth. Idli, dosa, uthappam, Pesarattu, appam, pongal, and paniyaram are popular breakfast dishes in Tamil Nadu.

=== Music and dance ===
Tamil Nadu is home to Bharatanatyam, a distinct dance form. Other regional folk dances include Karakattam, Kavadi, Kerala Natanam, Koodiyattam, Oyilattam and Puravaiattam. The dance, clothing, and sculptures of Tamil Nadu exemplify the beauty of the body and motherhood. The traditional music of Tamil Nadu is known as Carnatic music, which includes rhythmic and structured music by composers such as Purandara Dasa, Kanaka Dasa and Muthuswami Dikshitar. Nadaswaram, a reed instrument that is often accompanied by the thavil, a type of drum instrument are the major musical instruments used in temples and weddings. Melam is a group of Maddalams and other similar percussion instruments from the ancient Tamilakam which are played during events. Tamil cinema has a chequered history with the first cinema of South India being established in Coimbatore and the production of first silent film in South India in 1916.

=== Literature ===
Tamil Nadu has an independent literary tradition dating back over 2500 years from the sangam era. Tamil literature was composed in three successive poetic assemblies known as Tamil Sangams, the earliest of which, according to ancient tradition, were held on a now vanished continent far to the south of India. This Tamil literature includes the oldest grammatical treatise, Tholkappiyam, and the epics Silappatikaram and Manimekalai.

=== Architecture ===
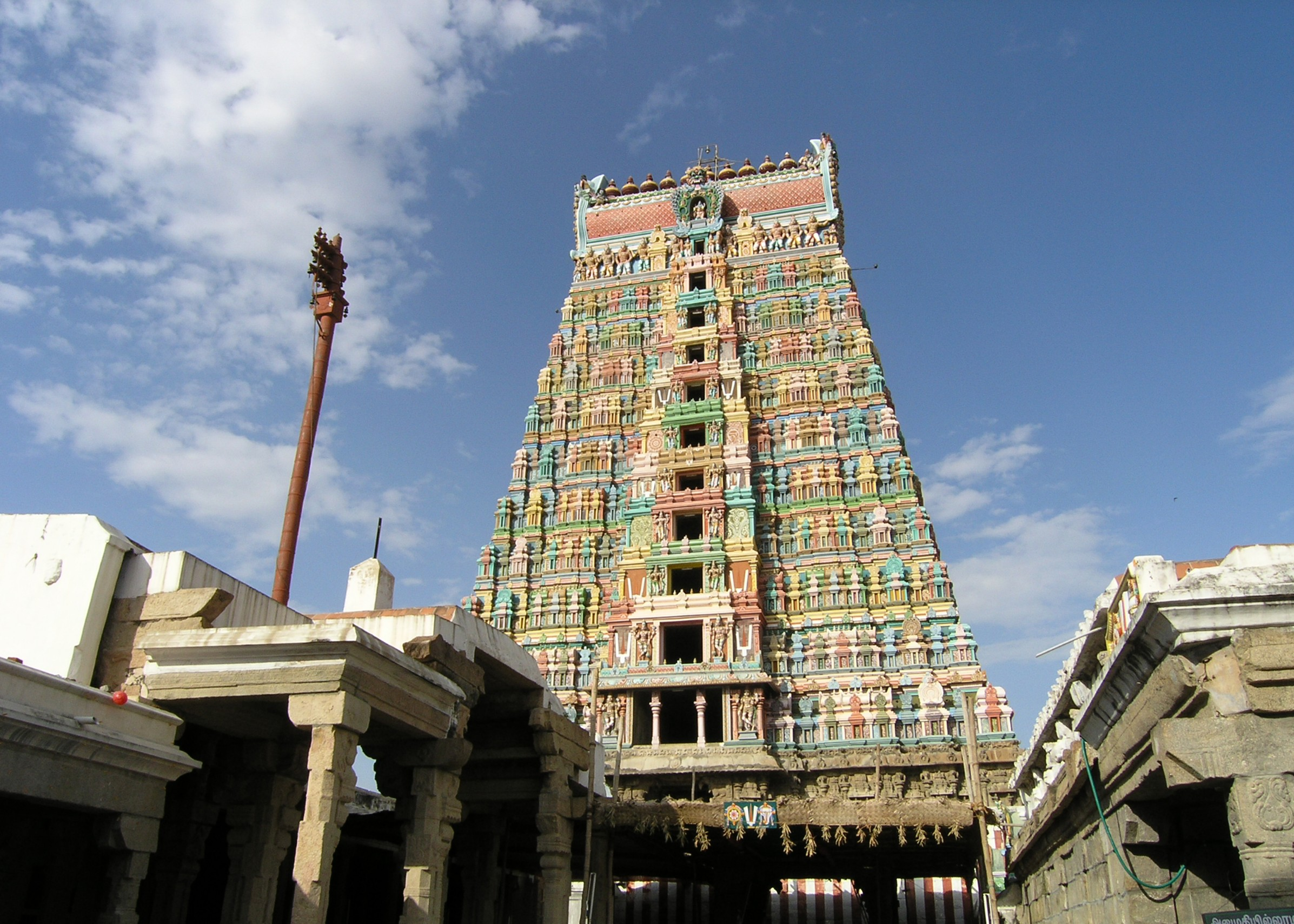
The large gopuram is a hallmark of Dravidian architecture

Dravidian architecture is the distinct style of rock architecture in Tamil Nadu. In Dravidian architecture, the temples considered of porches or Mantapas preceding the door leading to the sanctum, Gate-pyramids or Gopurams in quadrangular enclosures that surround the temple and Pillared halls used for many purposes and are the invariable accompaniments of these temples. Besides these, a South Indian temple usually has a tank called the Kalyani or Pushkarni. The Gopuram is a monumental tower, usually ornate at the entrance of the temple forms a prominent feature of Koils and Hindu temples of the Dravidian style. They are topped by the kalasam, a bulbous stone finial and function as gateways through the walls that surround the temple complex. The gopuram's origins can be traced back to the Pallavas who built the group of monuments in Mahabalipuram and Kanchipuram. The Cholas later expanded the same and by the Pandya rule in twelfth century, these gateways became a dominant feature of a temple's outer appearance. Vimanam are similar structures built over the garbhagriha or inner sanctum of the temple but are usually smaller than the gopurams in the Dravidian architecture with a few exceptions including the Brihadisvara Temple in Thanjavur.

With the Mugal influence in medieval times and the British later, a rise in the blend of Hindu, Islamic and Gothic revival styles, resulting in the distinct Indo-Saracenic architecture with several institutions during the British era following the style. By the early 20th century, the art deco made its entry upon in the urban landscape. After Independence, the architecture witnessed a rise in the Modernism with the transition from lime-and-brick construction to concrete columns.

== Festivals ==
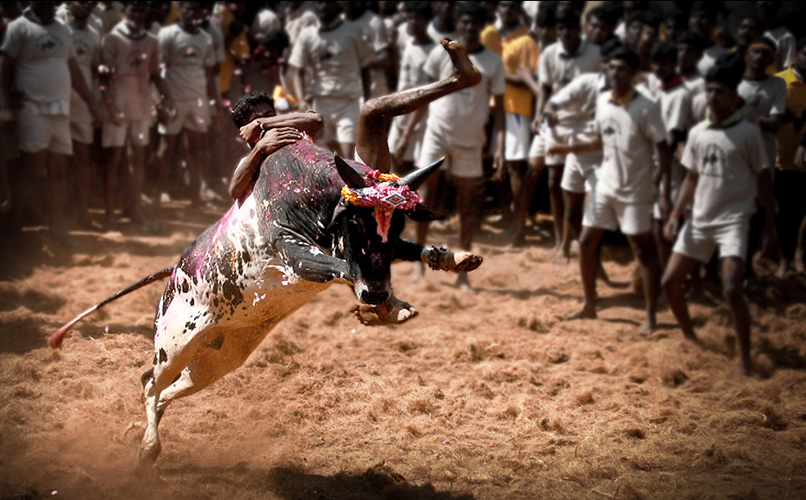
Jallikattu, a traditional bull taming event held during Pongal festivities, attracts huge crowds

Pongal is a major and multi-day harvest festival celebrated by Tamils. It is observed in the month of Thai according to the Tamil solar calendar and usually falls on 14 or 15 January. It is dedicated to the Surya, the Sun God and the festival is named after the ceremonial "Pongal", which means "to boil, overflow" and refers to the traditional dish prepared from the new harvest of rice boiled in milk with jaggery offered to Surya. Mattu Pongal is meant for celebration of cattle when the cattle are bathed, their horns polished and painted in bright colors, garlands of flowers placed around their necks and processions. Jallikattu is a traditional event held during the period attracting huge crowds in which a bull is released into a crowd of people, and multiple human participants attempt to grab the large hump on the bull's back with both arms and hang on to it while the bull attempts to escape.

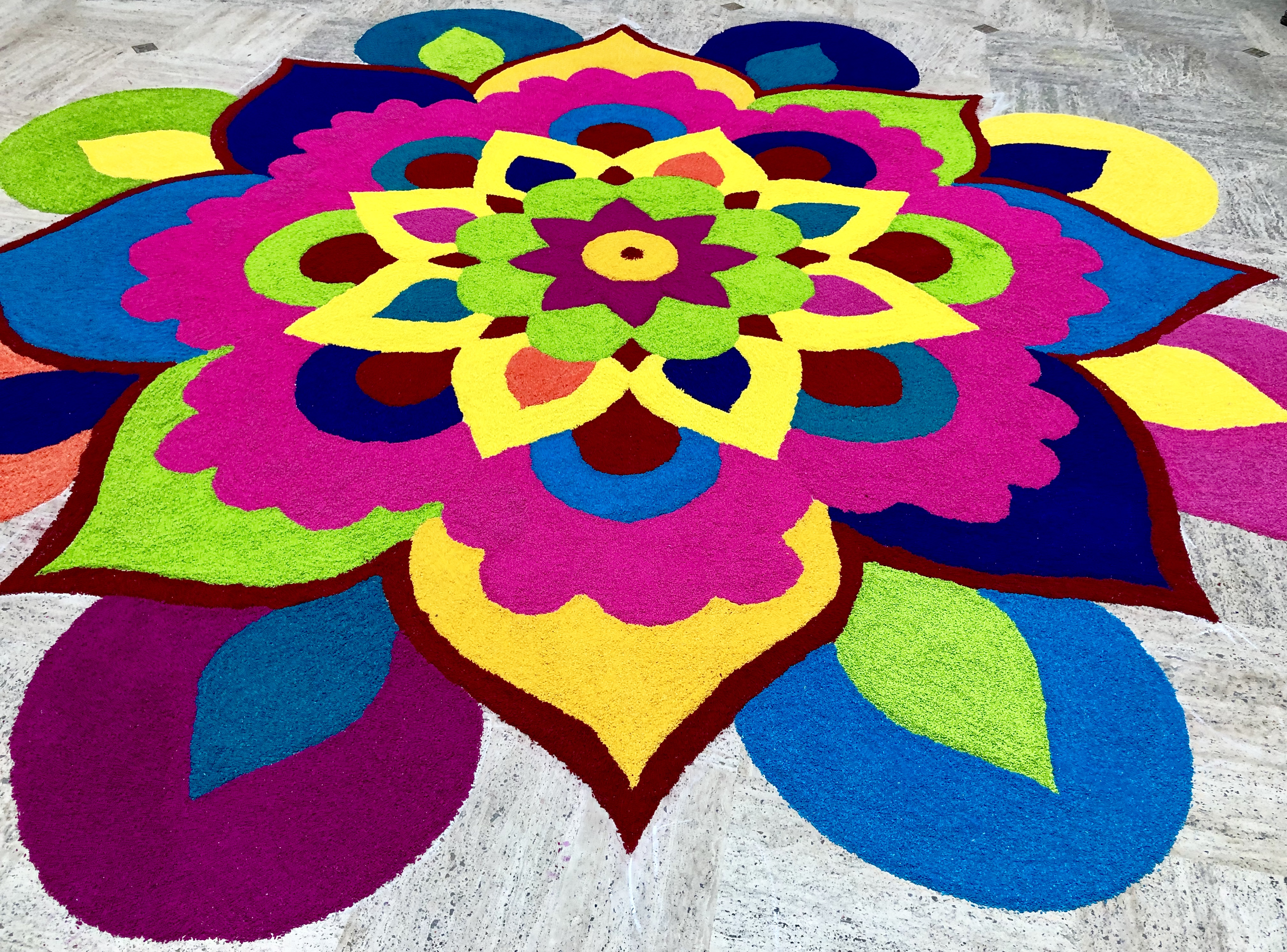
Tamils decorate their homes with colorful geometric designs called Kolam made from rice powder

Puthandu is known as Tamil New Year which marks the first day of year on the Tamil calendar. The festival date is set with the solar cycle of the solar Hindu calendar, as the first day of the Tamil month Chithirai and falls on or about 14 April every year on the Gregorian calendar. Karthikai Deepam is a festival of lights that is observed on the full moon day of the Kartika month, called the Kartika Pournami, falling on the Gregorian months of November or December. Thaipusam is a Tamil festival celebrated on the first full moon day of the Tamil month of Thai coinciding with Pusam star and dedicated to lord Murugan. Kavadi Aattam is a ceremonial act of sacrifice and offering practiced by devotees which is a central part of Thaipusam and emphasizes debt bondage. Aadi Perukku is a Tamil cultural festival celebrated on the 18th day of the Tamil month of Adi which pays tribute to water's life-sustaining properties. The worship of Amman and Ayyanar deities are organized during the month in temples across Tamil Nadu with much fanfare. Panguni Uthiram is marked on the purnima (full moon) of the month of Panguni and celebrates the wedding of various Hindu gods.

Tyagaraja Aradhana is an annual music festival devoted to composer Tyagaraja. In Tiruvaiyaru in Thanjavur district, thousands of music artists congregate every year. Chennaiyil Thiruvaiyaru is a music festival which has been conducted from 18 to 25 December every year in Chennai. Chennai Sangamam is a large annual open Tamil cultural festival held in Chennai with the intention of rejuvenating the old village festivals, art and artists. Madras Music Season, initiated by Madras Music Academy in 1927, is celebrated every year during the month of December and features performances of traditional Carnatic music by artists from the city.

== Transportation ==
Tamil Nadu has a developed, dense, and modern transportation infrastructure, encompassing both public and private transport. Chennai is well-connected by land, sea, and air and serves as a major hub for entry into South India. Tamil Nadu has an extensive road network covering about 2.71 lakh km connecting all cities, towns and major villages. Tamil Nadu State Transport Corporation (TNSTC) run by Government of Tamil Nadu is the primary public transport bus operator in the state. Tamil Nadu has a rail network of 5,601 km (3,480 mi) and forms a part of Southern Railway of Indian Railways, headquartered in Chennai. There are 532 railway stations in the state connecting all major cities and towns with Chennai Central, Chennai Egmore, Coimbatore Junction and Madurai Junction amongst the major stations. Chennai suburban, MRTS and Metro form a well-established suburban railway network in Chennai. There are three international, one limited international and six domestic or private airports in Tamil Nadu. Chennai airport, which is the fourth busiest airport by passenger traffic in India is a major international airport and the main gateway to the state. Tamil Nadu has three major ports Chennai, Ennore and Thoothukudi, intermediate port at Nagapattinam and sixteen other minor ports.

== Major attractions ==
=== Beaches ===
Marina Beach, one of the longest urban beaches

Tamil Nadu has a 1,076 kilometres (669 mi) long coastline, with many beaches dotting the coast. Marina Beach, spanning 13 km (8.1 mi), is the second-longest urban beach in the world and Elliot's Beach south of the Adyar river delta, are the major beaches in Chennai. Kovalam beach, located 40 km (25 mi) away from Chennai, offers adventure sports such as windsurfing. Mamallapuram, known for its Pallava architecture, has a beach spanning a distance of over 20 km (12 mi). Dhanushkodi is an abandoned town at the south-eastern tip of Pamban Island, in Gulf of Mannar, with large beaches. Kanyakumari beach forms the southernmost tip of mainland India, where the Arabian Sea, the Indian Ocean, and the Bay of Bengal meet. Ariyaman Beach is located about 21 km (13 mi) from Rameswaram, featuring large casuarina trees and is a center for water sports. Poompuhar was once the capital of Chola empire and a bustling port city that witnessed many historic events and the ancient beach is dotted with ruins and boulders.

=== Forts ===
Tamil Nadu has a large number of historical forts built across various eras. Fort St. George, founded in 1639, was the first English fortress in India around which the modern city of Chennai evolved. The fort currently houses the Tamil Nadu legislative assembly and other official buildings. Gingee Fort, originally built in 1190 CE is a large fort and citadel in Villupuram district. Vellore Fort is a large 16th-century fort built by the Vijayanagara Empire. Other forts include Alamparai Fort, Dindigul Fort, Rock Fort, Sadras Fort, Sangagiri Fort, Udayagiri Fort and Vattakottai Fort.

=== Hill stations ===
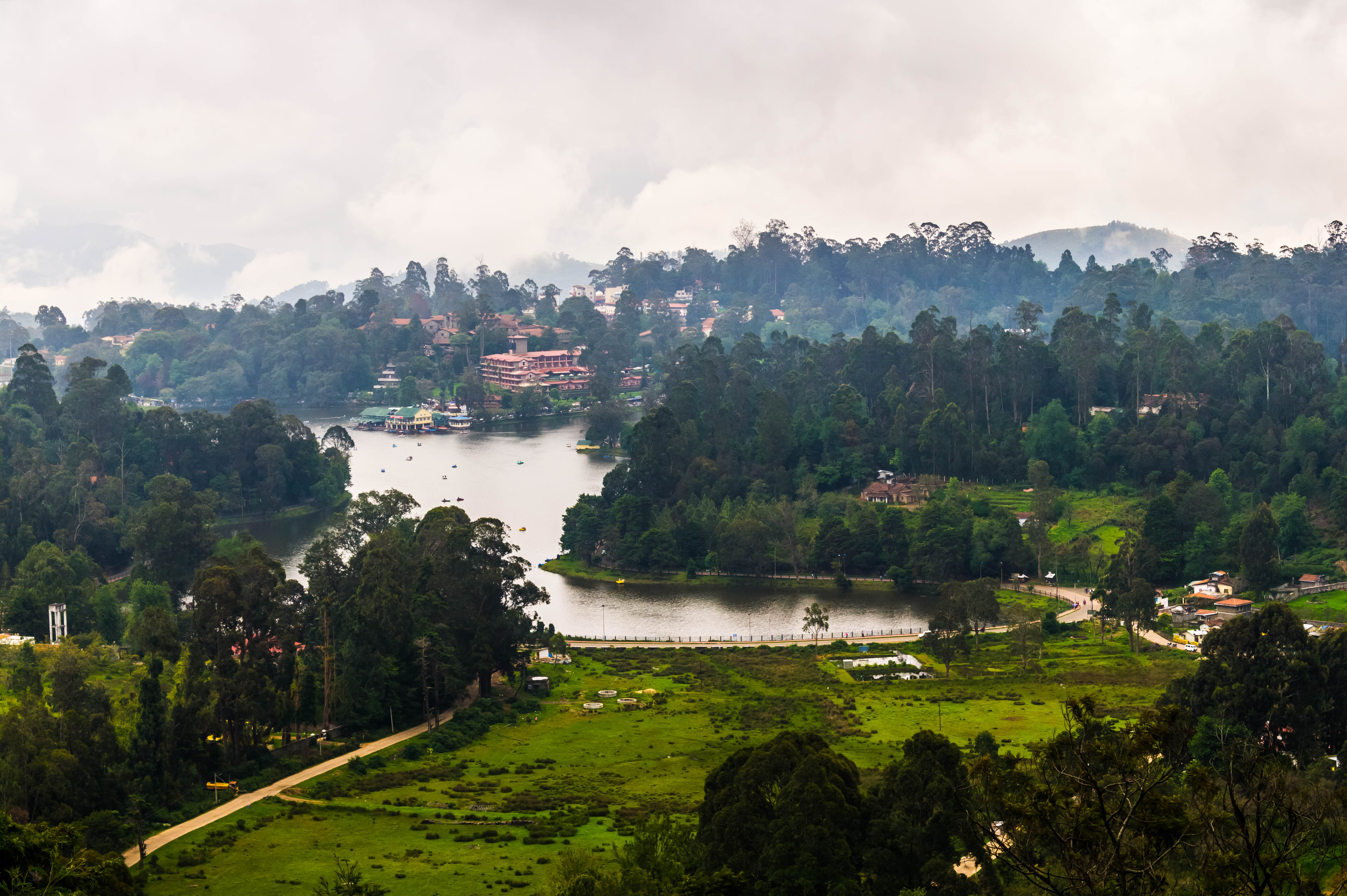
Kodaikanal, one of the major hill stations

Tamil Nadu is straddled by the Western and Eastern Ghats and is home to many hill stations. Udagamandalam (Ooty) situated in the Nilgiri Hills, known as "Queen of Hill Stations", is amongst the most popular hill stations in South India and is connected by the Nilgiri Mountain Railway. Doddabetta, the highest peak in Tamil Nadu is located close to Ooty and host a lake and the Government Botanical Garden. Located in the forests of Palani hills, Kodaikanal is known as the "Princess of Hill stations" and hosts multiple lakes including Kodaikanal lake and Berijam lake, waterfalls and valleys. Yercaud, situated at an altitude of 1,515 m (4,970 ft) is a hill station in the Eastern Ghats known for its rich flora and scenic views of the hills. Valparai is a hill station in the Anaimalai Hills, located 3,500 ft (1,100 m) above sea level is noted for its rich fauna. Other popular hill stations include Yelagiri, Sirumalai, Kotagiri, Kollimalai, Meghamalai, Pachaimalai, Jawaddhu hills and Kalvarayan hills.

=== Museums and art centers ===
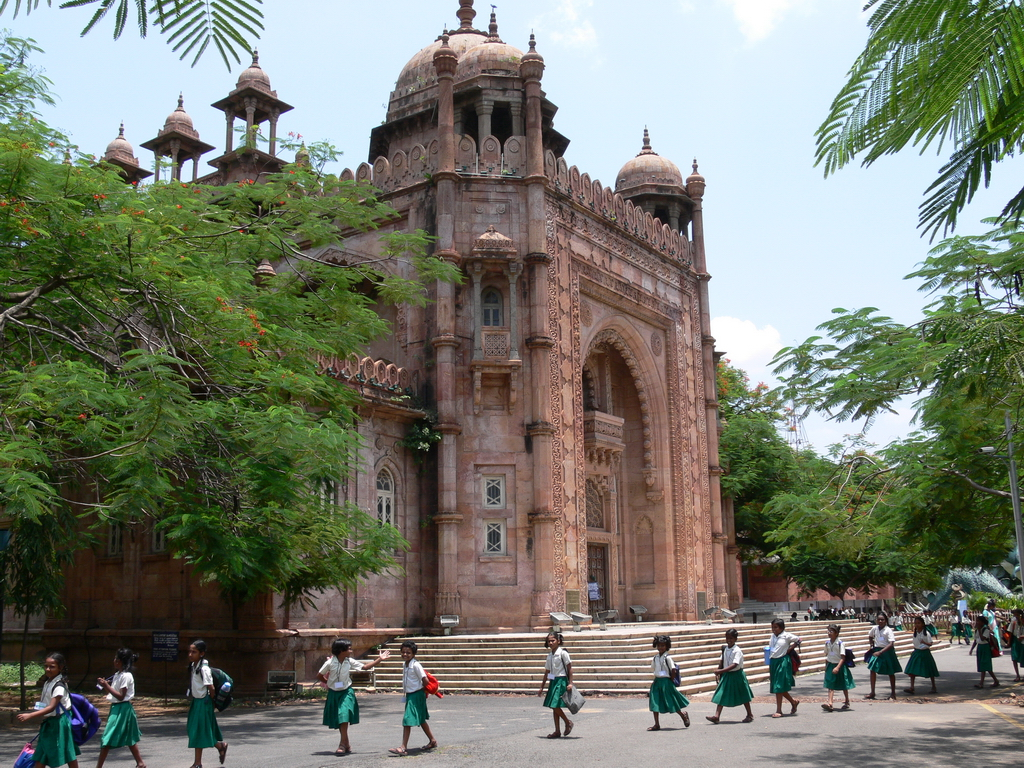
National Art Gallery, one of the oldest art galleries in India

Chennai is called the Cultural Capital of South India. Cultural centers include Kalakshetra and DakshinaChitra in Chennai. Established in the early 18th century, Government Museum and National Art Gallery in Chennai are amongst the oldest in the country. The museum inside the premises of Fort St George in Chennai maintains a collection of objects of the British era and has in its possession, the first Flag of India hoisted at after the declaration of India's Independence on 15 August 1947. Saraswathi Mahal Library, established during 16th century, is one of the oldest libraries and museum in India with a rare collection of Palm leaf manuscripts and old paper books.

=== Religious sites ===
Rock-cut cave-temples

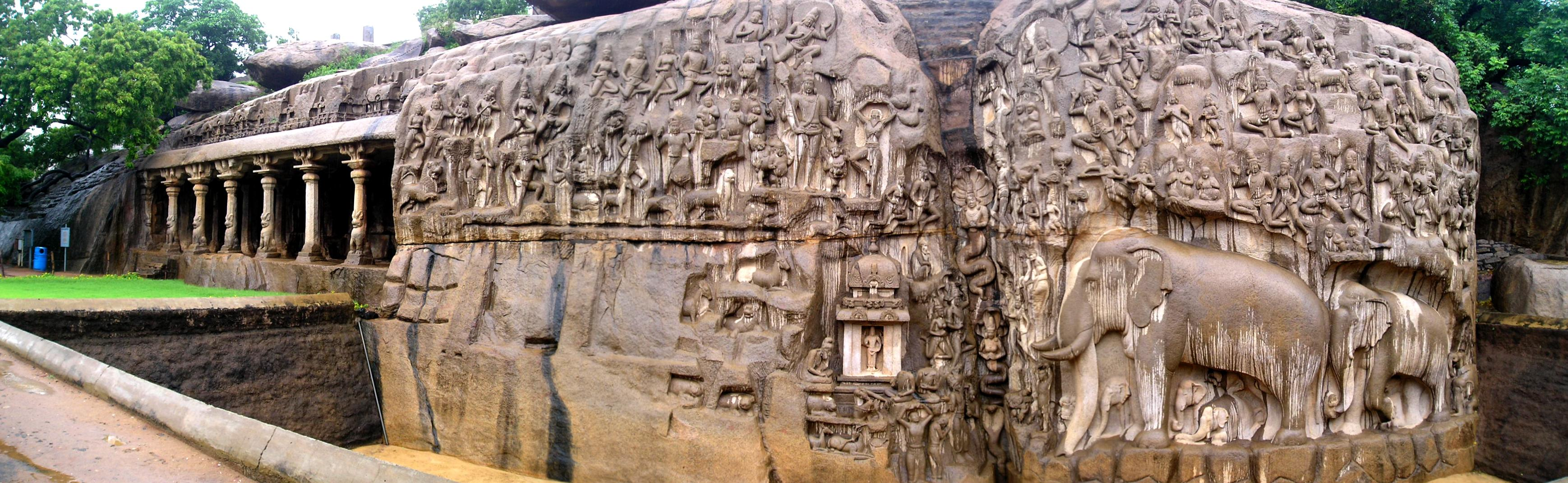
Descent of the Ganges, one of the largest rock reliefs in the world from Mahabalipuram

There are a number of rock-cut cave-temples established by the ancient Tamil kings and later by Pandyas and Pallavas. The Group of Monuments at Mahabalipuram, built by the Pallavas in the 7th and 8th centuries has more than forty rock-cut temples and monoliths including one of the largest open-air rock reliefs in the world. Sittanavasal is a rock-cut monastery and temple attributed to Pandyas and Pallavas which consist of frescoes and murals from the 7th century, painted with vegetable and mineral dyes in over a thin wet surface of lime plaster. Kalugumalai consist of three rock-cut temples–Kalugumalai Jain Beds, Vettuvan Koil and Kalugasalamoorthy Temple, with rock relief sculptures dating back to Pandya period of 8th to 9th century. Chitharal monuments situated on the Thiruchanattu malai consist of monuments from two distinct periods: rock-cut structure of beads with inscriptions and drip-ledges from first century BC to sixth century AD and temple monuments likely built by Digambara Jains in the ninth century. Samanar hills is a hill rock complex located in Keelakuyilkudi, 15 kilometres (9.3 mi) from Madurai consisting of several Tamil-Brahmi inscriptions, stone beds and sculptures from more than 2,200 years ago.

Hindu temples

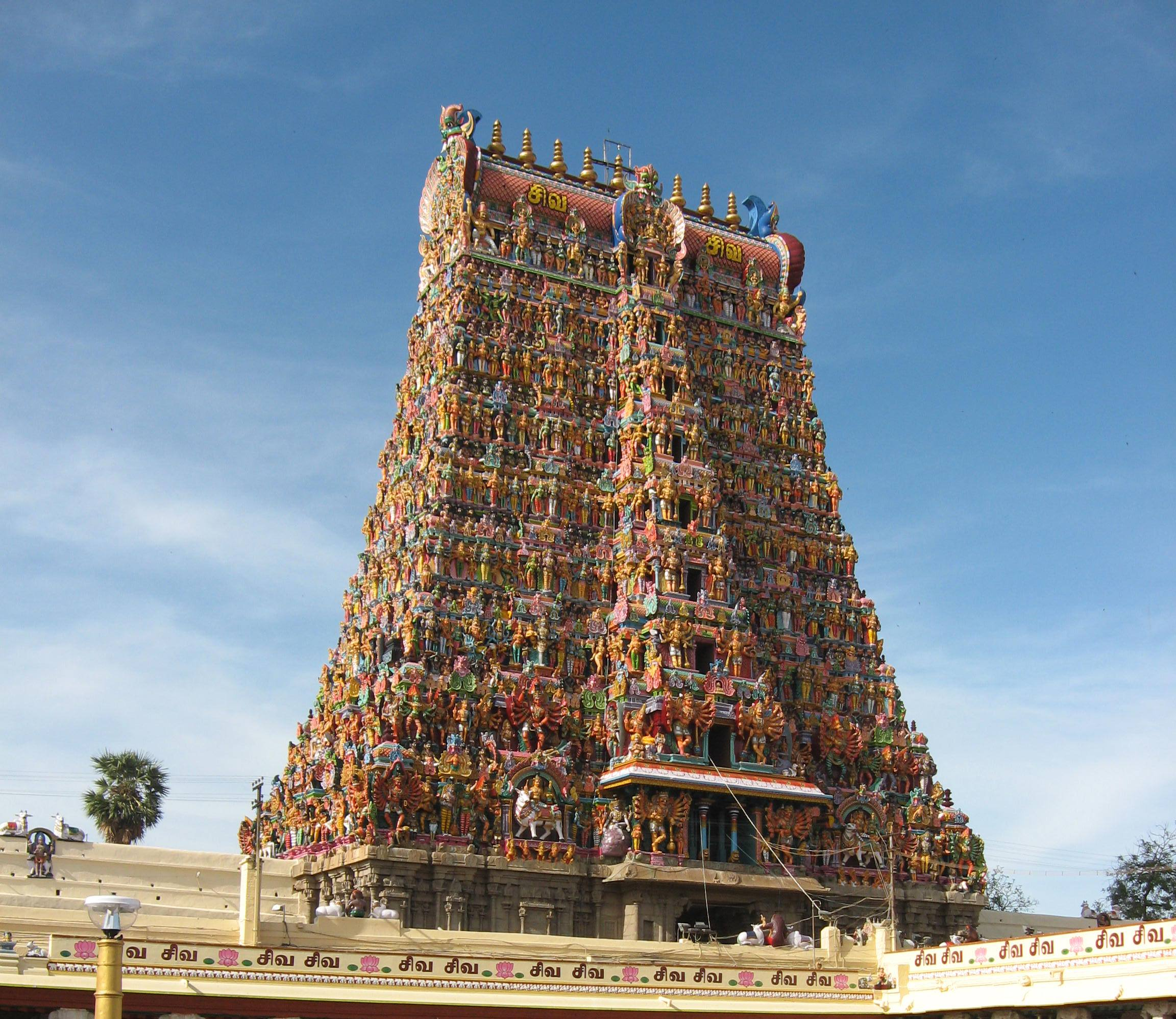
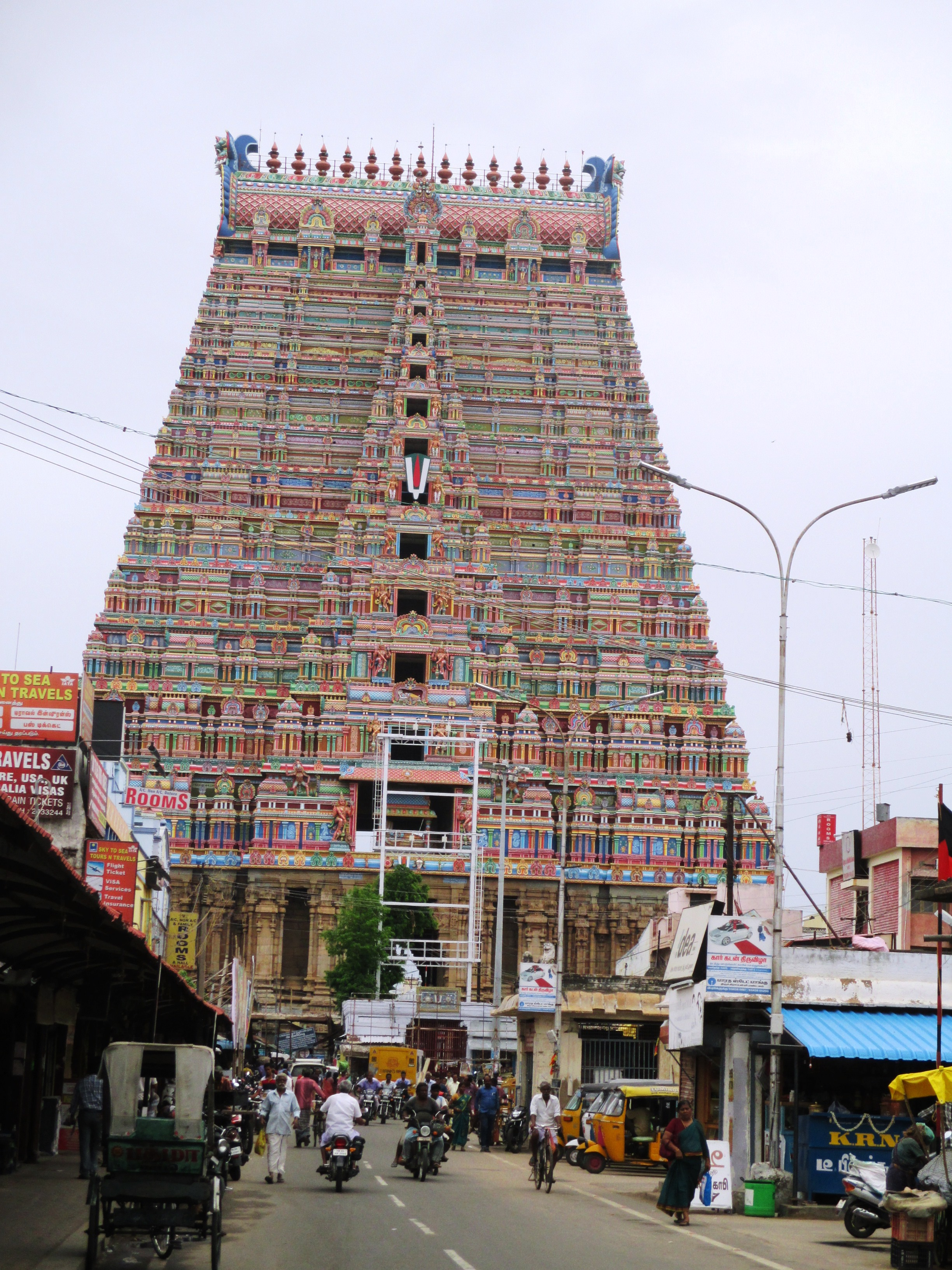
Gopuram of Meenakshi Temple at Madurai (left) and Ranganathaswamy Temple, Srirangam hosts the highest Gopuram in Tamil Nadu

There are more than 34,000 temples in Tamil Nadu built across various periods some of which are several centuries old. Most temples follow the Dravidian architecture, a distinct style of rock architecture. In Dravidian architecture, the temples considered of large porches or Mantapas with monumental gate-pyramids or Gopurams and the Gopurams are well-recognized hall marks of the temples in the region with the gopuram being adopted as the symbol of Emblem of Tamil Nadu. The origins of large temples with ornate Gopurams can be traced to the Pallavas which were later expanded by the Cholas and Pandyas. 84 of the 108 Divya Desams, which are Vishnu and Lakshmi temples that is mentioned in the works of the Alvars, the poet-saints of the Sri Vaishnava tradition are located in Tamil Nadu. Paadal Petra Sthalam are 276 Shaivite temples that are revered in the verses of Nayanars in the 6th-9th century CE. Four of the ive Pancha Bhuta Sthalam refers to temples dedicated to Shiva, each representing a manifestation of the five prime elements of nature which include Ekambareswarar temple of Kanchi, Jambukeshwarar temple of Thiruvanaikaval, Arunachaleswara temple of Thiruvannamalai and Natarajar temple of Chidambaram. Arupadaiveedu are six temples at Thiruparankundram, Tiruchendur, Palani, Swamimalai, Tiruttani, and Pazhamudircholai which are dedicated to Tamil God Murugan and mentioned in Sangam literature.

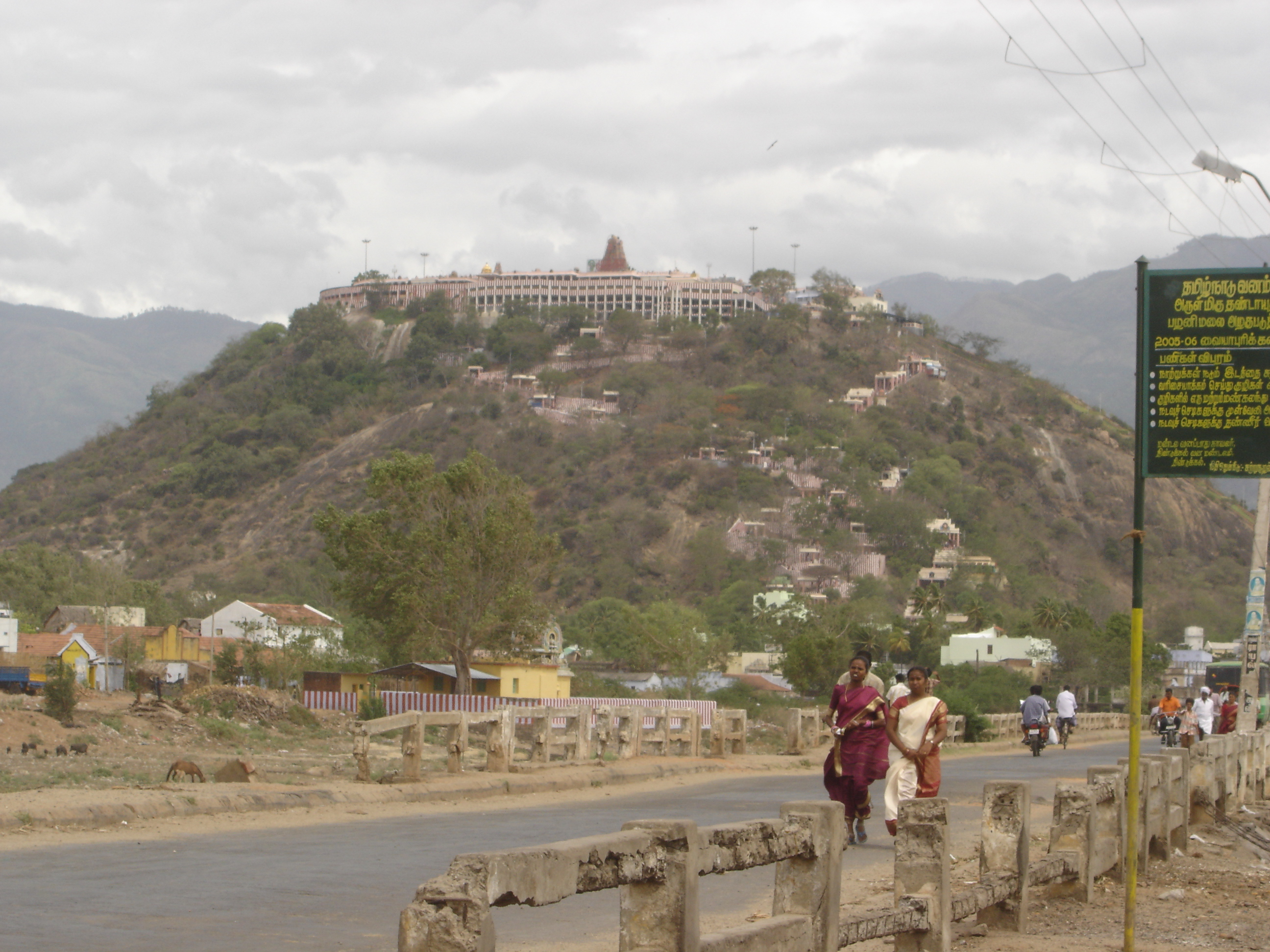
Palani Murugan Temple, one of the Six Abodes of Murugan

Madurai also called as "Temple city" consists of many temples including the massive Meenakshi Amman Temple said to originally date back to the 4th century CE. Kanchipuram, considered as one of the seven great holy cities, is a major temple town with many temples including the Kailashnathar temple, Kamakshi temple and Varadharaja Perumal temple, dating back to the Pallava period. Kumbakonam is another major temple town located 40 km (25 mi) from the erstwhile Chola capital of Thanjavur and hosts many temples including the Adi Kumbeswarar temple, Ramaswamy temple, Kashi Vishwanath temple, Someswar Temple and Sarangapani temple. Srirangam Ranganathaswamy Temple is the largest temple complex in India and the biggest functioning Hindu temple in the world with a 236 feet (72 m) tall Rajagopuram, one of the tallest in the world. Ramanathaswamy Temple located at Rameswaram island forms a part of Ram setu and is said to be sanctified by the lord Rama when he crossed the island on his journey to rescue his wife, Sita from the Ravana. Namakkal Anjaneyar Temple hosts a 18 ft (5.5 m) tall Hanuman statue, one of the tallest in India. Srivilliputhur Andal Temple is a temple dedicated to lord Vishnu, believed to be the birthplace of two of the Alvars, namely Periyalvar and his foster-daughter, Andal. There are a lot of temples devoted to lord Ganesha, major of which are the Uchippillaiyar temple in Tiruchirappalli, Eachanari Vinayagar temple in Coimbatore hosting a 6.3 ft (1.9 m) tall idol and Karpaka Vinayakar temple in Pillayarapatti. There are a number of hill temples dedicated to lord Murugan and Amman temples dedicated to goddess Parvati are found across the state. Dhyanalinga is a yogic temple located at the Velliangiri, 30 km (19 mi) from Coimbatore with a 13.75 ft (4.19 m) tall Lingam and Adiyogi statue, the tallest bust of Shiva in the world.

Mosques

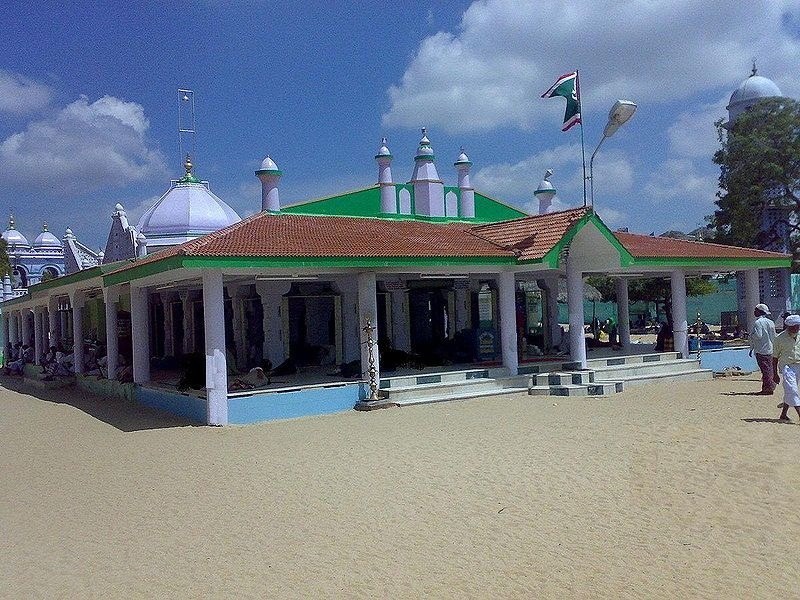
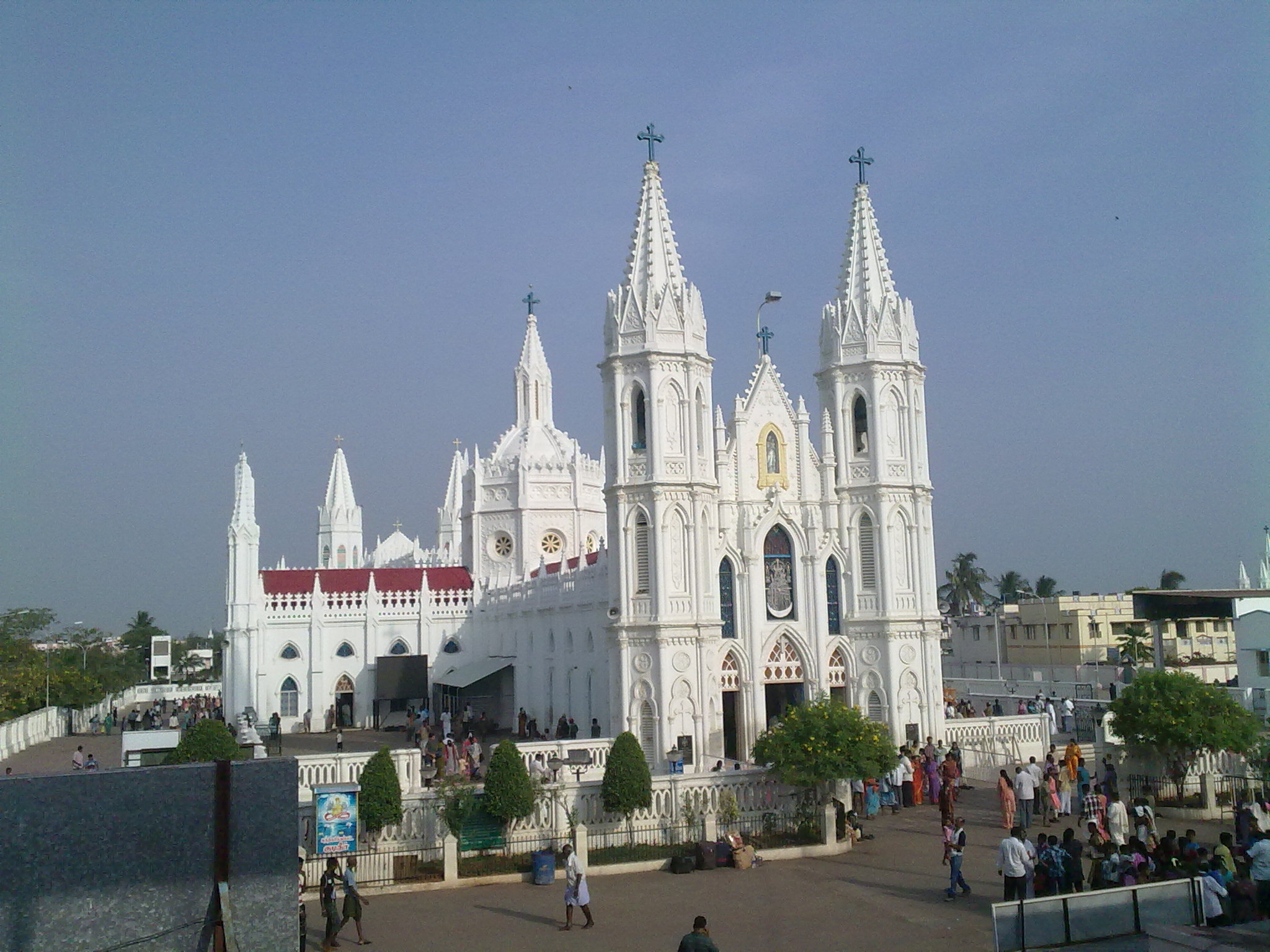
Erwadi Dargah (left) and 16th-century Basilica of Our Lady of Good Health at Velankanni

Erwadi in Ramanathapuram district houses an 840-year-old mosque and the annual santhanakoodu festival held during the Islamic month of Dhul Qidah attracts people of all faiths from different regions. Madurai hosts two big mosques, Kazimar Big Mosque and Madurai Maqbara. Nagore, a town north of Nagapattinam, is the home to Nagore Dargah where the urs festival is celebrated every year and attracts pilgrims from both Sufi Islam and Hinduism.

Churches

The Christian apostle, St. Thomas, is believed to have preached in the area around Chennai between 52 and 70 CE and the Santhome Church, which was originally built by the Portuguese in 1523, is believed to house the remains of St. Thomas, was rebuilt in 1893 in neo-Gothic style. The 16th-century Basilica of Our Lady of Good Health is located at Velankanni, about 12 km (7.5 mi) south of Nagapattinam on the Eastern coast. The town declared as a holy city by the pope is known as the 'Lourdes of the East'.

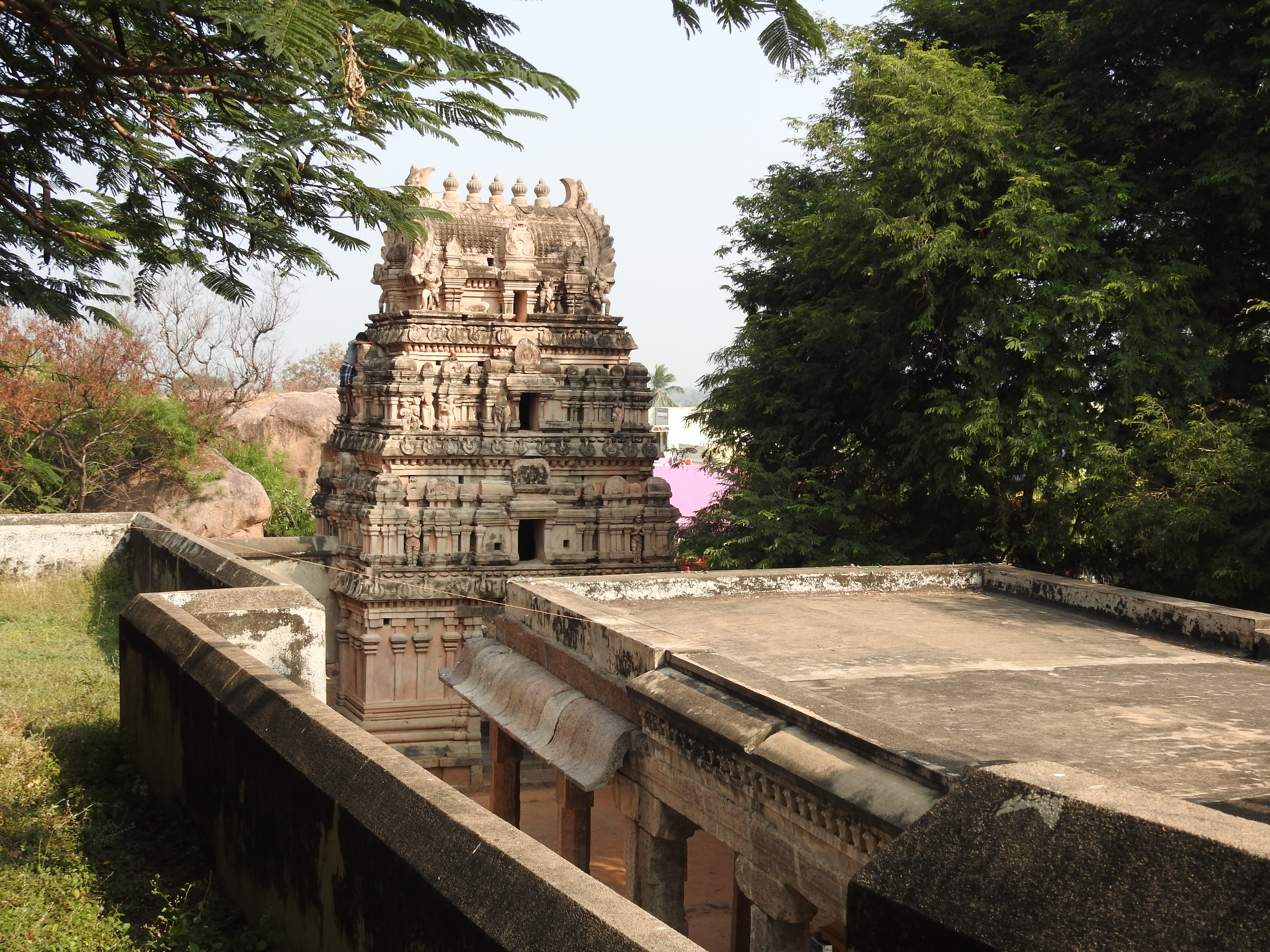
Mahavira temple at Tirumalai

Jain temples

The Kalabhra dynasty, who were patrons of Jainism, ruled over the ancient Tamil country in the 3rd–7th century CE with the Pallavas and Pandyas also supporting Jainism. Major Jain temples include Kanchi Trilokyanatha temple, Chitharal Jain Temple, Mannargudi Mallinatha Swamy Temple, Vijayamangalam Jain temple, Alagramam Jain Temple, Poondi Arugar Temple, Thanjavur Adisvaraswamy Jain Temple and Kumbakonam Chandraprabha Jain Temple. Tirumalai is an ancient Jain temple complex in the outskirts of Tirvannamalai that houses caves and Jain temples and a 16 feet (4.9 m) high sculpture of Neminatha dated from the 12th century and the tallest Jain image in Tamil Nadu.

Maths and memorials

Vivekananda Rock Memorial, located off the coast of Kanniyakumari was built in 1970 in honour of Swami Vivekananda, who is said to have attained enlightenment on the rock. Sri Ramakrishna Math, Chennai was established in 1897 by Swami Ramakrishnananda in memory of Ramakrishna Paramahamsa.

=== World Heritage sites ===
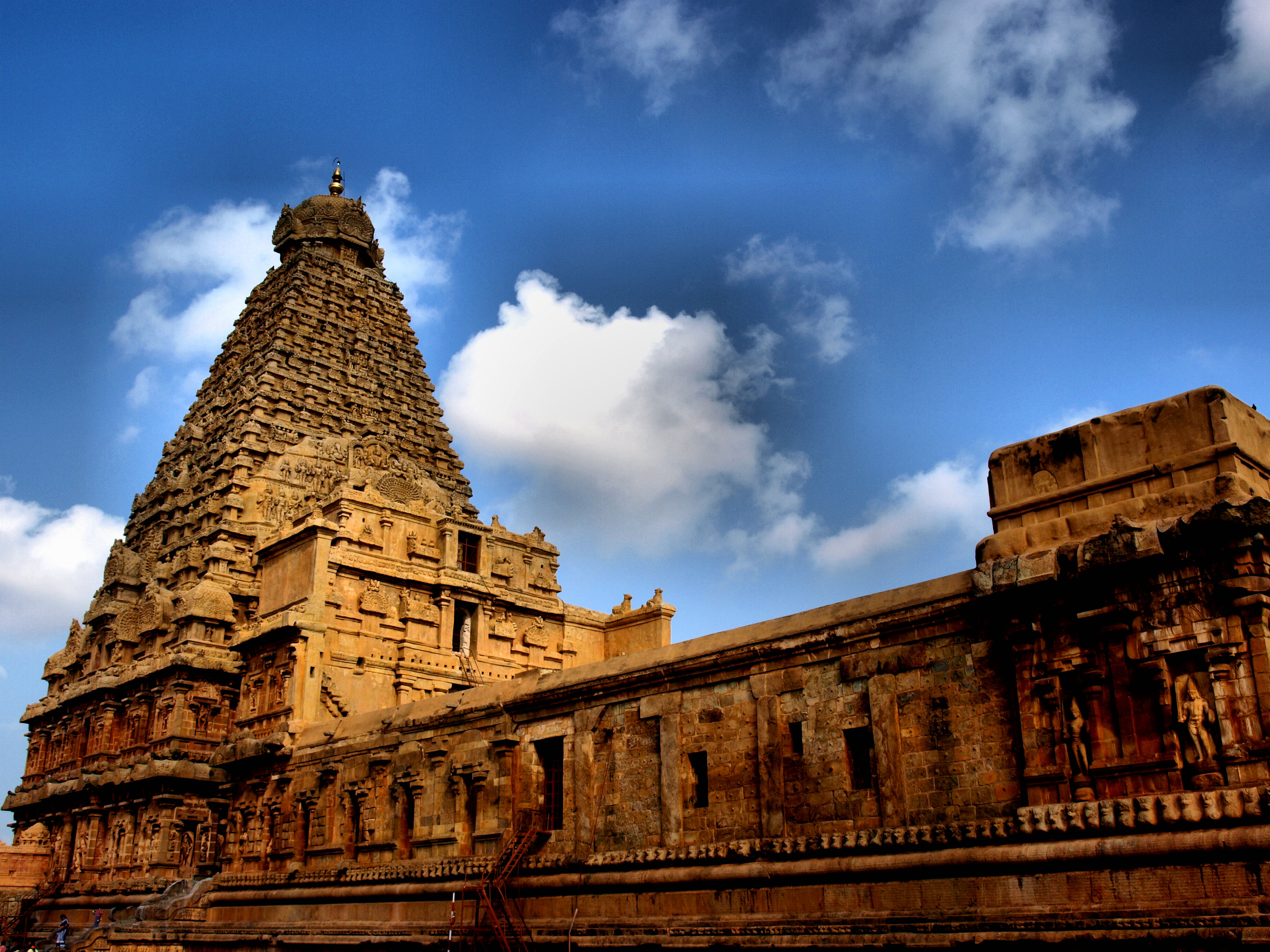
Brihadisvara Temple at Thanjavur, built in 11th century CE

There are four World Heritage Sites declared by UNESCO in the state.

- Group of Monuments at Mahabalipuram, declared in 1984, include rock-cut temples and monuments built during the Pallava period (7th-8th centuries CE).
- Great Living Chola Temples, declared in 1987, include three temples belonging to Chola period (11th-12th centuries CE Brihadisvara temple at Thanjavur, Brihadisvara temple at Gangaikonda Cholapuram and Airavatesvara Temple at Darasuram).
- Nilgiri Mountain Railway, declared in 2008, a 1,000 mm (3 ft 3 3/8 in) metre gauge railway in Nilgiris operated by the Southern Railway which is the only rack railway in India.
- Nilgiri Biosphere Reserve, declared in 1986, a biosphere reserve and bio-diversity hotspot in the Nilgiri Mountains of the Western Ghats and the largest protected forest area in India.

=== Waterfalls ===
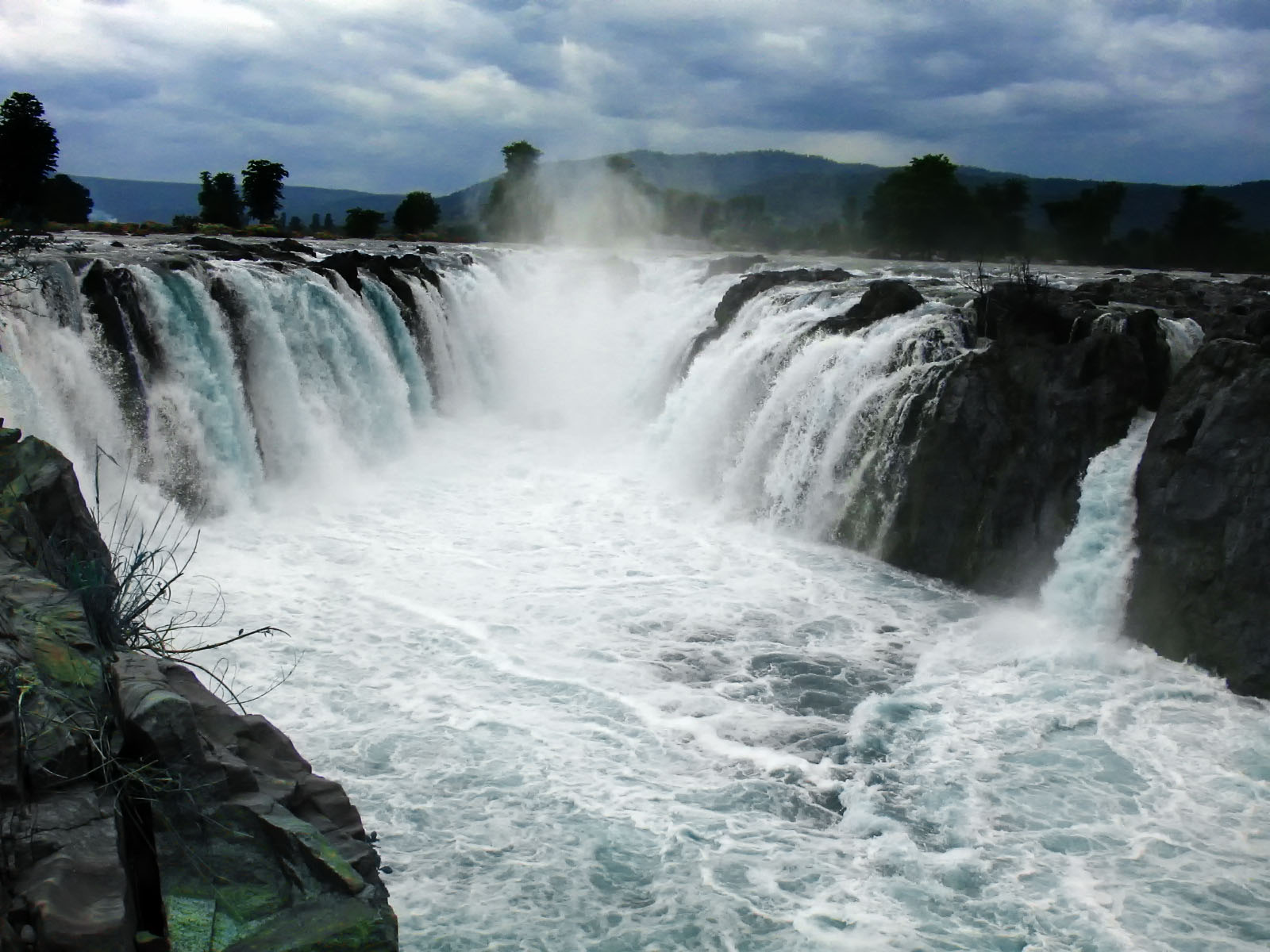
Hogenakkal Falls, one of the popular waterfalls

With many rivers and streams, there are a number of waterfalls in the state. Courtallam is a popular waterfall in Tenkasi district consisting of nine falls of varying volume and height. Hogenakkal is a set of waterfalls and rapids where Kaveri river enters the state from Karnataka. Other waterfalls include Agaya Gangai, Ayyanar falls, Catherine falls, Kalhatti falls, Katary falls, Kiliyur falls, Kumbakkarai falls, Kutladampatti falls, Law's falls, Monkey falls, Sengupathi falls, Siruvani falls, Suruli falls, Thalaiyar falls, Tirparappu falls, Ulakkai falls, Vaideki falls and Vattaparai falls.

=== Wildlife sanctuaries and reserve forests ===
Protected areas

Protected areas cover an area of 3,305 km^{2} (1,276 sq mi), constituting 2.54% of the geographic area and 15% of the 22,643 km^{2} (8,743 sq mi) recorded forest area of the state. Mudumalai National Park was established in 1940 and was the first modern wildlife sanctuary in South India. The protected areas are administered by the Ministry of Environment and Forests of Government of India and the Tamil Nadu Forest Department.

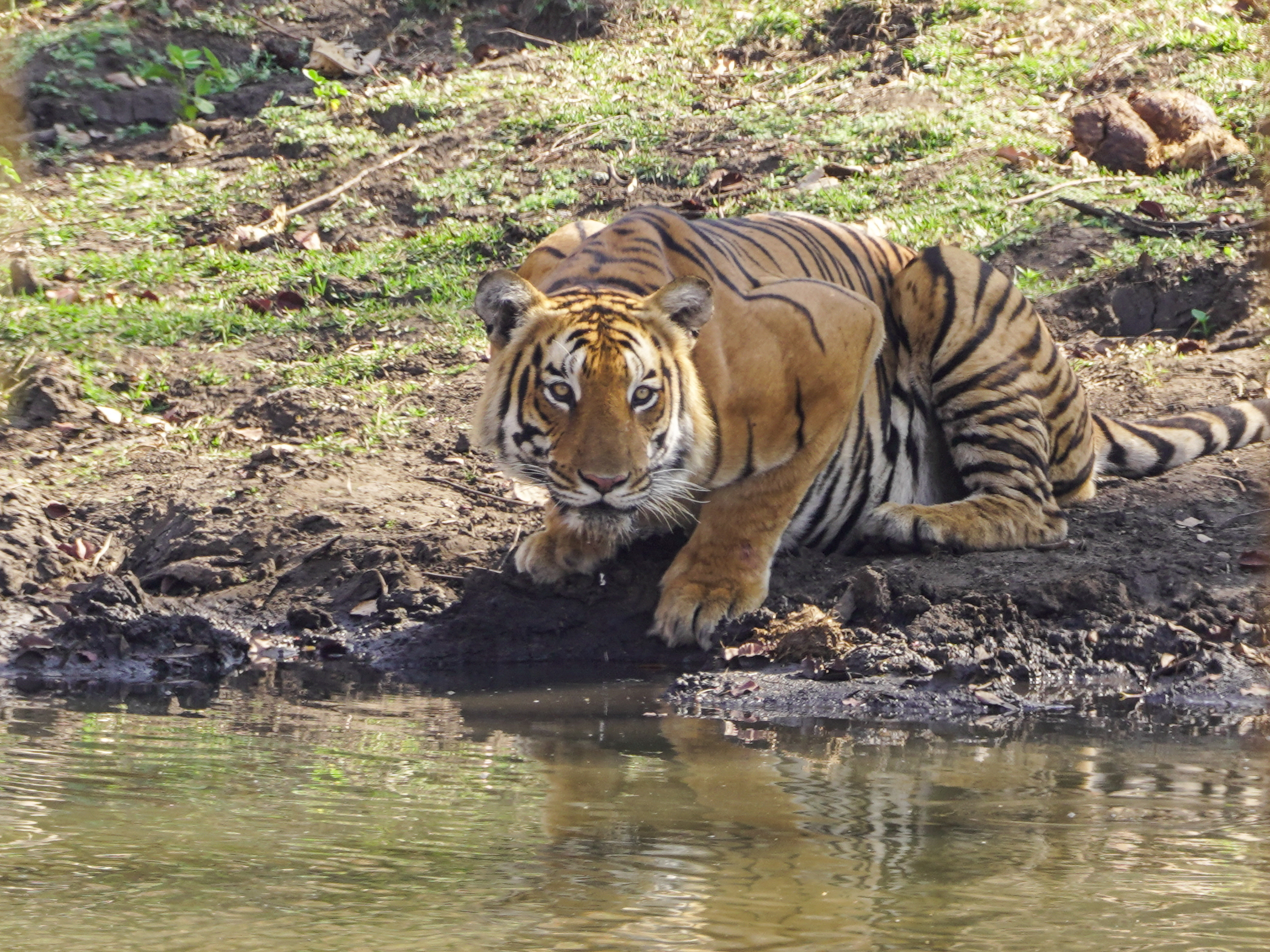
A Bengal tiger at Mudumalai National Park, the first modern wildlife sanctuary in South India

There are three biosphere reserves in Tamil Nadu–Gulf of Mannar, Nilgiris and Agasthyamalai. Pichavaram consists of a number of islands interspersing the Vellar estuary in the north and Coleroon estuary in the south with mangrove forests. The Pichavaram mangrove forests is one of the largest mangrove forests in India covering 45 km^{2} (17 sq mi) and supports the existence of rare varieties of economically important shells, fishes and migrant birds. The state has five National Parks covering 307.84 km^{2} (118.86 sq mi)–Anamalai, Mudumalai, Mukurthi, Gulf of Mannar, a marine national park and Guindy, an urban national park within Chennai. Tamil Nadu has 18 wildlife sanctuaries.

There are five declared elephant sanctuaries in Tamil Nadu as per Project Elephant–Agasthyamalai, Anamalai, Coimbatore, Nilgiris and Srivilliputtur. Tamil Nadu participates in Project Tiger and has five declared tiger reserves–Anamalai, Kalakkad-Mundanthurai, Mudumalai, Sathyamangalam and Megamalai. There are seventeen declared bird sanctuaries in Tamil Nadu.

There is one conservation reserve at Tiruvidaimarudur in Thanjavur district. There are two zoos recognised by the Central Zoo Authority of India namely Arignar Anna Zoological Park and Madras Crocodile Bank Trust, both located in Chennai. The state has other smaller zoos run by local administrative bodies such as Coimbatore Zoo in Coimbatore, Amirthi Zoological Park in Vellore, Kurumpampatti Wildlife Park in Salem, Yercaud Deer Park in Yercaud, Mukkombu Deer Park in Tiruchirapalli and Ooty Deer Park in Nilgiris. There are five crocodile farms located at Amaravati in Coimbatore district, Hogenakkal in Dharmapuri district, Kurumbapatti in Salem district, Madras Crocodile Bank Trust in Chennai and Sathanur in Tiruvannamalai district.

== Medical tourism ==
Tamil Nadu is a major center for medical tourism and Chennai is termed as "India's health capital". Medical tourism forms an important part of the economy with more than 40% of total medical tourists visiting India making it to Tamil Nadu.

== See also ==
- Economy of Tamil Nadu
- Outline of tourism in India
