= Armamalai Cave =

Cave with paintings in Tamil Nadu, India

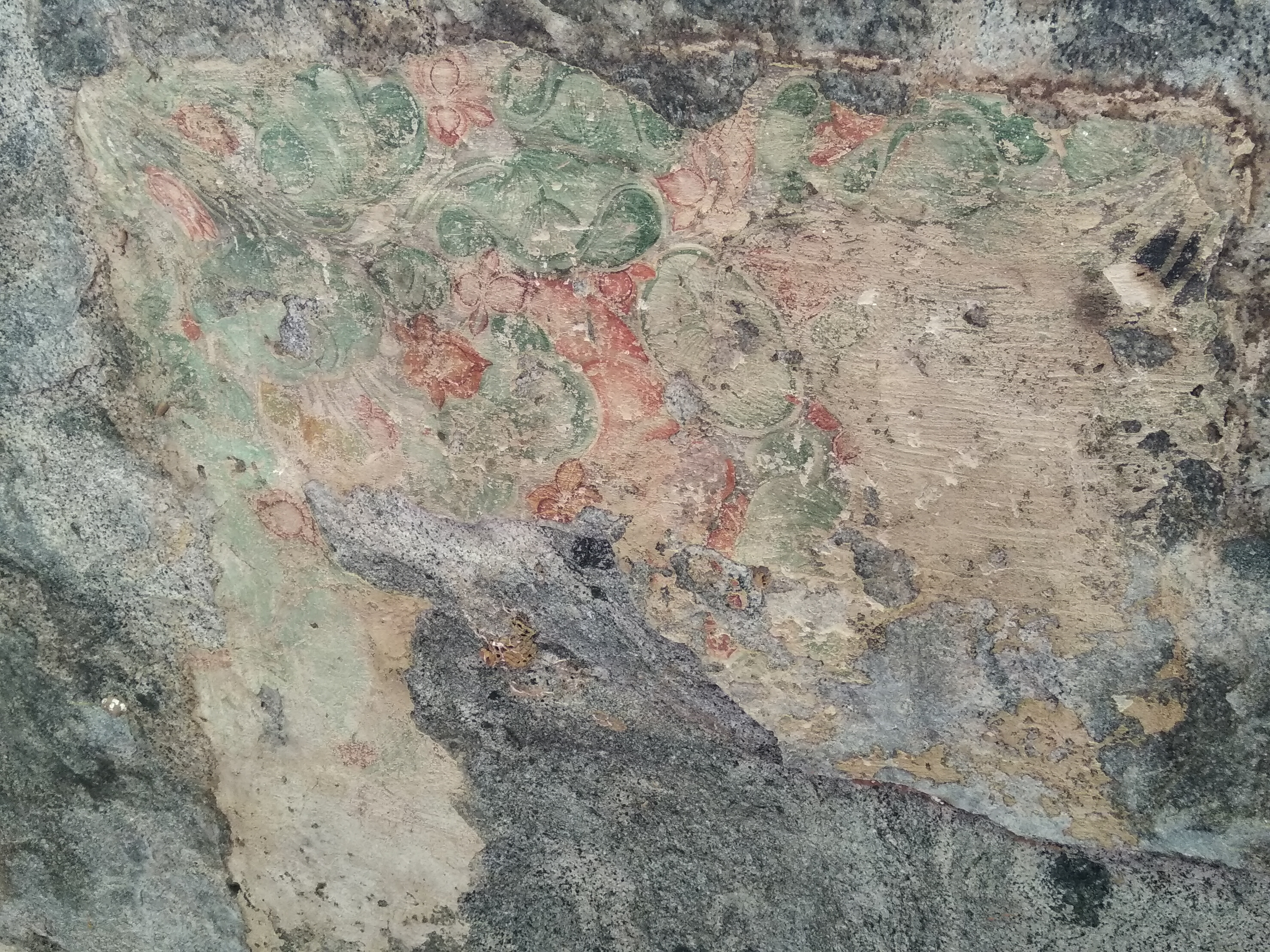
- Painting at Armamalai Cave

- Location within Tamil Nadu
- Location: Malayampattu, Tamil Nadu
- Coordinates: 12°45′31″N 78°38′34″E
- Geology: Limestone

Armamalai Cave is known for its Indian cave paintings. It is to the west of Malayampattu village which is 25 kilometres (16 mi) from Ambur in the Tirupattur district of Tamil Nadu. The cave is in the protected monument by the Archaeological Survey of India and it is a Tamil Nadu tourist attraction.

== Information ==
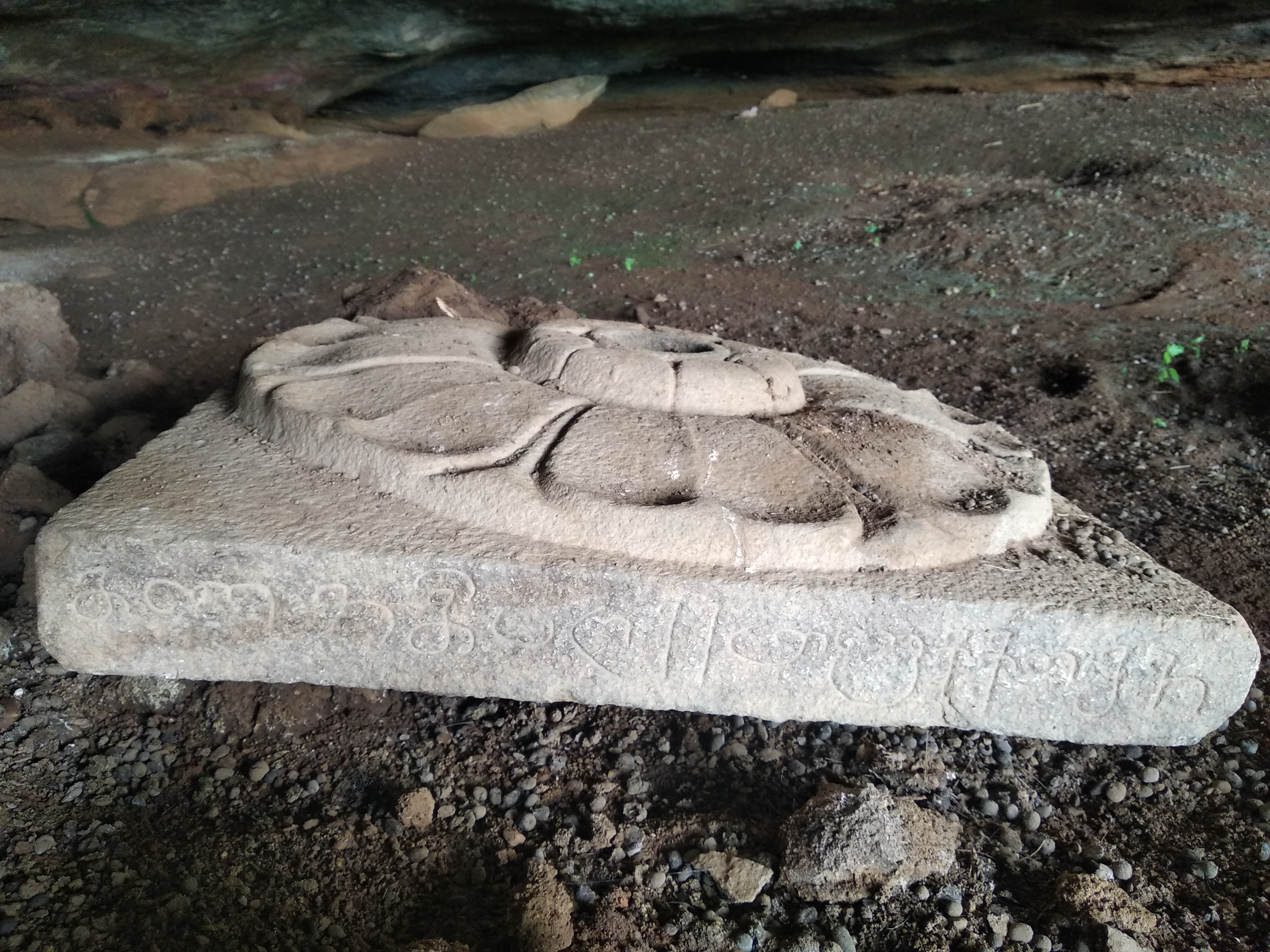
Stone carving with inscription

Armamalai Cave is a natural cave which was converted to a Jain temple in 8th century AD. The cave contains 8th century Jain paintings, petroglyphs, rock art and the remains of Jain saints. The mural paintings are on the roof and walls of the cave. The paintings were created by applying colours on the thin lime surface and over the thick mud surface. These paintings were made by the Jain monks who stayed in the cave during the period when their religion was flourishing in the ancient Tamil country. The paintings in the cave are applied by two techniques, Fresco and Tempera. They are similar to the paintings of Sittanavasal Cave, another ancient Jain cave in Tamil Nadu and Bagh Caves, an ancient Buddhist cave in Madhya Pradesh. The paintings in the cave are thought to be medieval cave paintings in India.

Archeologists found the rock arts in the cave in the late 1960s. Previous research at the site by Gabriel Jouveau-Dubreuil, who died in 1945, had found antiquities of Pallava dynasty, who ruled at that time. Jouveau-Dubreuil claimed to have discovered this cave from information he had found on the Udayendiram copper plates which had referred to a village given away by the Pallava ruler Nandivarman II that sounded like Kumaramangalam. Further enquiries enabled him to find the cave to the west of Malayampattu. The paintings explain the native stories of Jainism and also had images of Astathik Palakas, also called as protectors of eight corners and they are Agni, Vayu, Kubera, Eesanya, Indra, Yama, Niruthi and Varuna. There are petroglyphs of plants and swans depicted as well. Tamil-Brahmi inscriptions are also seen on the walls of the cave. Most of the paintings and other arts in the cave have been damaged for various reasons.
