= List of Monuments of National Importance in Tamil Nadu =

This is a list of Monuments of National Importance (ASI) as officially recognized by and available through the website of the Archaeological Survey of India for the Indian state of Tamil Nadu. The state has a total of 412 Monuments of National Importance. In 2021, the ASI Chennai Circle was bifurcated to create a new Trichy Circle to improve administrative efficiency. As part of this reorganization, several monuments in southern Tamil Nadu—including some previously managed by the Thrissur Circle were reassigned to the new Trichy Circle. Of these, 250 monuments were under the jurisdiction of the Chennai Circle of the ASI. The Trichy Circle now has 162 Monuments of National Importance under its jurisdiction.

== List of monuments ==
The list of Monuments of National Importance for Tamil Nadu is subdivided in two circles:

- Chennai
  - List of Monuments of National Importance in Chennai circle
- Trichy
  - List of Monuments of National Importance in Trichy circle

== See also ==
- List of Monuments of National Importance in India for other Monuments of National Importance in India
- List of State Protected Monuments in Tamil Nadu
