= Kabilar Kundru =

Coordinates: 11.97273°N 79.211082°E

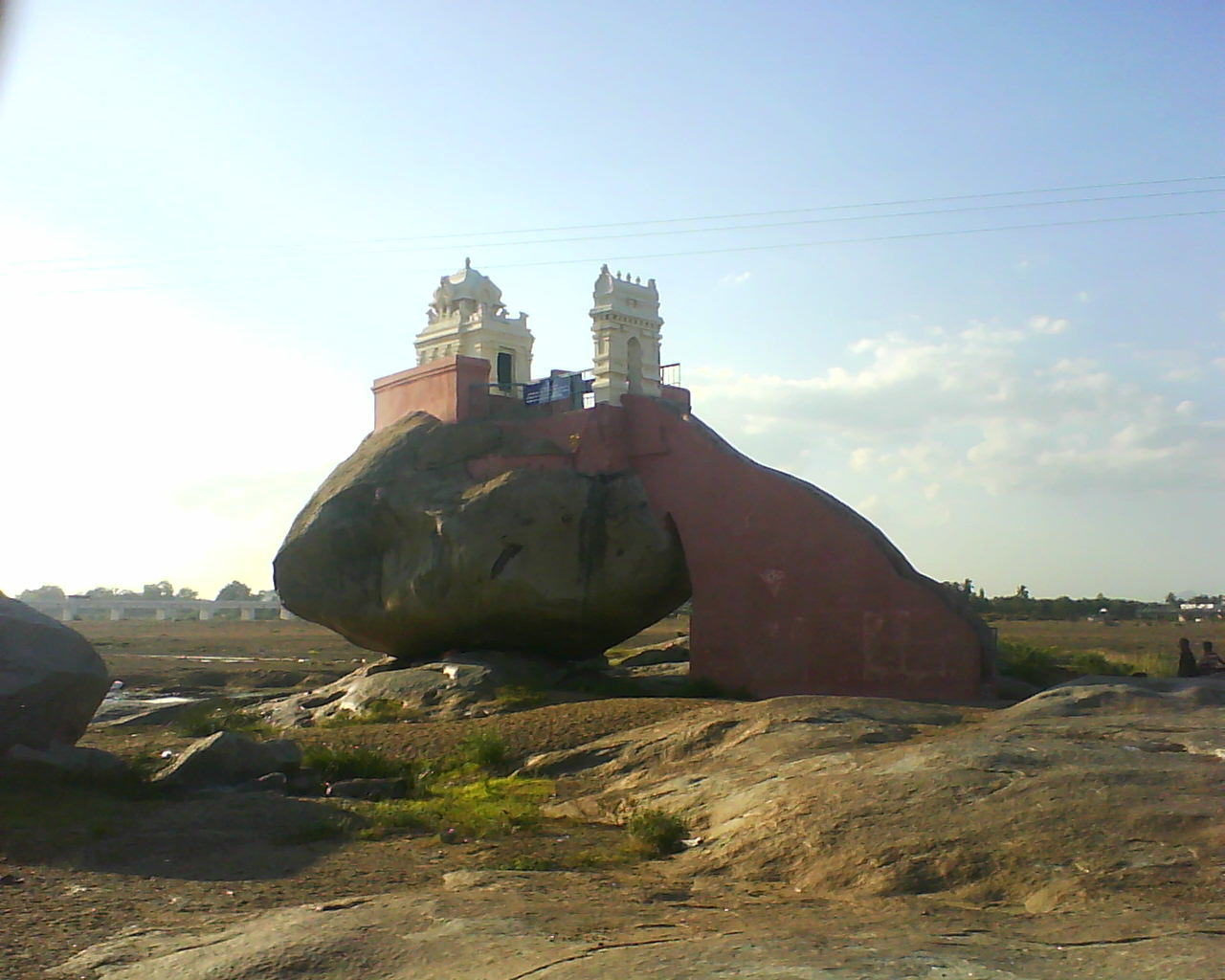
Kabilar rock

Kabilar Kundru (or Kabilar rock) is a hill rock in the middle of the Ponnaiyar River near Tirukoilur in Viluppuram district, Tamil Nadu, India. It is known for Tamil poet Kapilar did Vadakirrutal (fast unto death) here, after his friend Vēl Pāri was killed in a battle. It is one of the protected monuments in Tamil Nadu by the Archaeological Survey of India.
