= Chokkeeswarar Temple =

Shiva temple in Kanchipuram district, Tamil Nadu, India

Chokkeeswarar Temple or Kousikeswarar temple is a Hindu temple located in Kancheepuram, Tamil Nadu, India. It is one of the protected monuments in Tamil Nadu declared by Archaeological Survey of India. The temple was built by Cholas in the 9th century CE.

== Photogallery ==
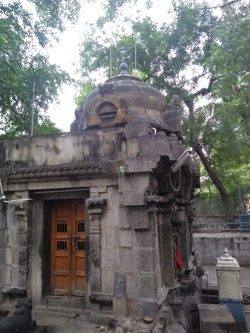
Entrance to sanctum sanctorum

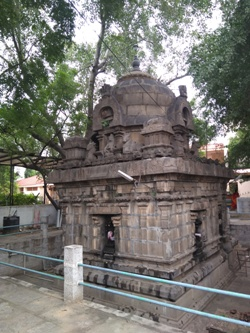
Rear view of the temple

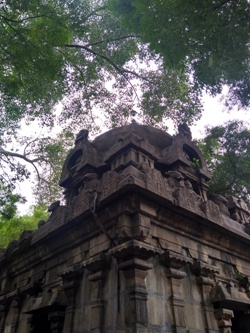
vimana of the presiding deity

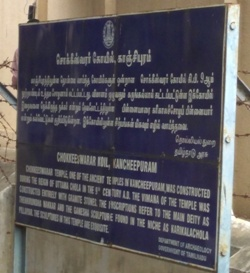
Notice board of Govt of Tamil Nadu
- (12°50′27″N 79°42′15″E)
