= Poondi Arugar Temple =

Jain temple in Tamil Nadu, India

- Ponnezhilnathar Temple
- Poondi Arugar Temple, Irumbedu, Arani, Tamil Nadu

Religion
- Affiliation: Jainism
- Deity: Ponnezhilnathar

Location
- Location: Irumbedu, Arani, Tiruvannamalai, Tamil Nadu, India
- Interactive map of Poondi Arugar Temple
- Coordinates: 12.697455°N 79.301535°E

Poondi Arugar Temple is a Jain temple which located 3 kilometres (1.9 mi) from Arani, Tiruvannamalai district, Tamil Nadu, India. The temple was built by Cholas. It is one of the protected monuments in Tamil Nadu declared by Archaeological Survey of India.
