= Sarabendrarajanpattinam =

Sarabendrarajanpattinam Mallipattinam
- village
- Country: India
- State: Tamil Nadu
- District: Thanjavur
- Taluk: Pattukkottai

Population (2001)
  - Total: 5,352

Languages
  - Official: Tamil
- Time zone: UTC+5:30 (IST)

Sarabendrarajanpattinam also called Mallipattinam is a coastal village in the Pattukkottai taluk of Thanjavur district, Tamil Nadu, India. It is well known for the Manora Fort

== Demographics ==
As per the 2001 census, Sarabendrarajanpattinam had a total population of 5352 with 2756 males and 2596 females. The sex ratio was 942. The literacy rate was 78.61.
