= Aranmanai Siruvayal =

Village in India

“The fine extensive village of Sherewele (Siruvayal), almost destroyed by the flames, which had spread with great fury, accelerated by a high wind, fell into our hands without opposition, although every house was capable of a sturdy defence, and it had a very thick hedge all around it"

— Colonel James Welsh in his book Military Reminiscences.

Aranmanai Siruvayal is a village in the Sivaganga District in Tamil Nadu, India.

== Geography ==
A bridge is being constructed over the Sarugani River near Highway 29, connecting Kallal and Kalayarkoil.

== British resistance ==
Freedom fighter Chinna Marudu [Cheena Murdoo] resided in Siruvayal [Sherewele]. The Fort of Marudu Brothers (also called Marudhupandiyar Fort), built by the Marudu Brothers (Periya Marudu and Chinna Marudu) to resist the British, reduced to rubble in 1800. The British took control of the fort on 30 July 1800.
