= Kalinga sculptures, Chengamedu =

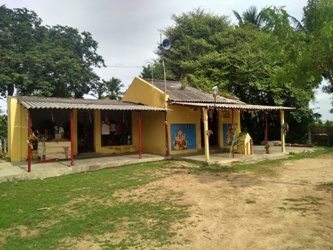
The temple where the sculptures are kept

Kalinga sculptures are the sculptures kept in Chengamedu near Gangaikonda Cholapuram in the Udayarpalayam taluk, Ariyalur district in Tamil Nadu, India. It is at a distance of 2 km in Kumbakonam-Setthiathoppu road.

== Location ==
Next to Gangaikonda Cholapuram, from the Cross road, at a distance of 1.5 km. Chengamedu, also known as Sengalmedu, is found. This area comprises Mela Chenghamedu and Keela Chenghamedu. The sculptures are found in a temple in Keela Cenghamedu. These sculptures are in two temples found in the same campus. In the Veerakaliamman Temple complex two separate structures are found. One of the sculptures are found in a structure and other sculptures are found in another building. They include the sculptures of Durga, Kali, Bhairava and Bhairavi brought by Rajendra Chola I from the Kalinga country.

== Speciality ==
The Bhairavi sculptures, also known as Kalinga Bahairavi, made of red stone, was brought after conquering Indrarathan and Melai Chalukyas. Bhairava is also made of red stone brought from there. There is also some more Kali sculptures which are kept in Veera Reddy Street and Saluppai (Chatram Alagar Temple). Like wise, in the eight directions of Gangaikonda Cholapuram so many sculptures of Mahisasuramardhini are found. Many of them were brought by Rajendra I are war trophies. The Mahisasuramardhi is also known as Durga. He was very fond of the deity and worshipped her. In order to protect his country, he kept the sculptures brought from various countries, in order to safeguard his country. Of these sculptures, near the place called Meikkavalputthur Manmalai, in the west, he kept a Mahisasuramardhini. Till date the deity is worshipped. The Durga sculptures which were brought by him were worshipped in many places nearby by the people. Another Durga is found in the north. As he was deeply attracted by the sculptures he brought them.

== War trophy ==
The Chola kings, after conquering the lands of others, brought many art subjects including sculptures pillars as war trophies. They were brought from many countries such as Chalukyam, Kalinga, Vangalam and Kampuciam. These sculptures are kept in the temple campus. The notice board which is kept by the Department of Archaeology of the Government of Tamil Nadu, in the temple campus says that "Sculptures of Durga, Kali and Bhairavar and Bhairavi found here were brought by Rajendra Chola I, 11th century AD from the Kalinga country as a mark of his victory. These sculptures of red sand stone are excellent examples."

== Gallery ==
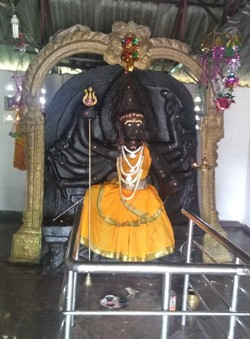

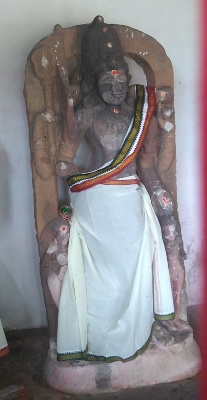

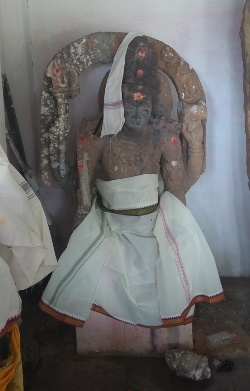

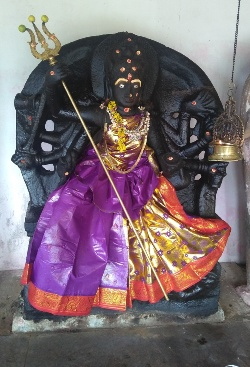

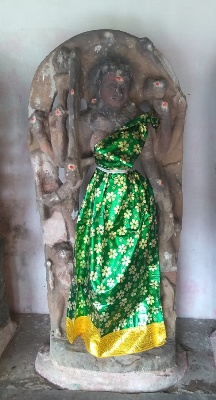

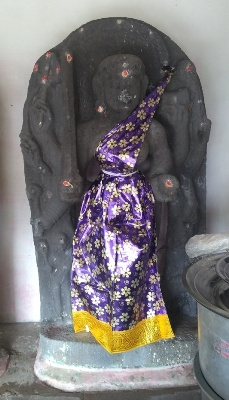

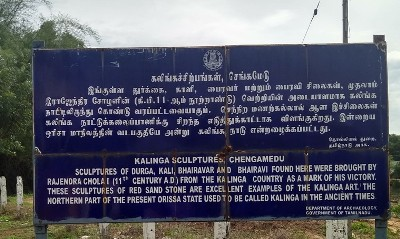
