= Ayyanar Falls =

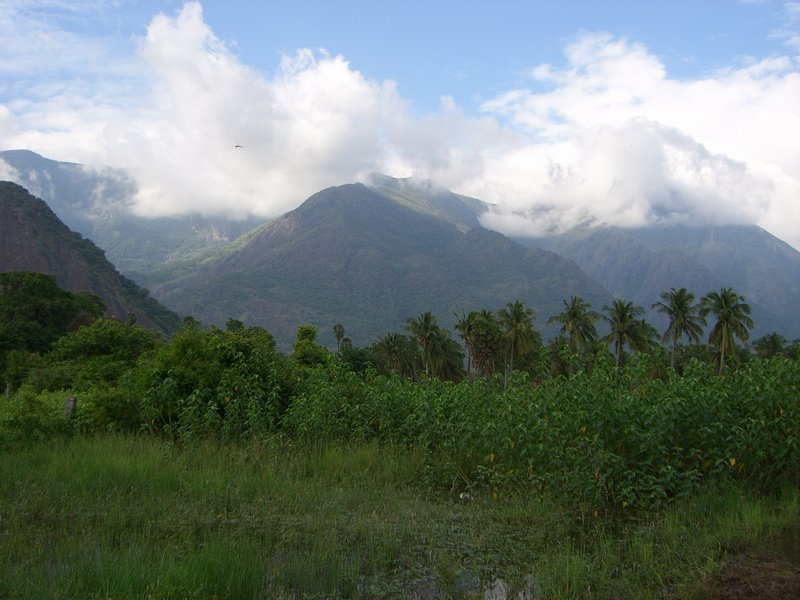

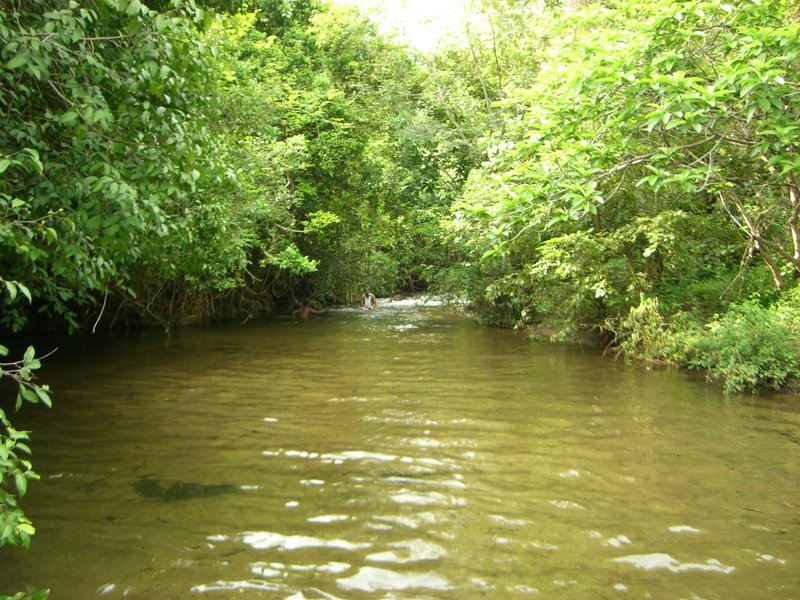
A remote stream near Ayyanar Kovil

Ayyanar Falls is located 6 km (3.7 mi) west of Rajapalayam, a city and a municipality in Virudhunagar District in the Indian State of Tamil Nadu. It is situated in the Western Ghats, which gets its water source mainly during the north east monsoon rain. The water from the falls is mainly used for drinking purposes by the people living in Rajapalayam.

The falls is one of the main attractions of Rajapalayam, and is a famous tourist spot for the people living in East part of Virudhunagar District, especially Srivilliputtur and Sivakasi. It provides good opportunity for woodland mountain climbing. A dam is situated on the way to Ayyanar Falls which provides water for the whole city.

The falls also attracts wildlife photographers who are interested in the bio-diversity of the Western Ghats. The ayyanar falls also serves as the source of water for the animals like Monkey, Elephant, Deer and Buffalo living in the forests of Western ghats.

The name Ayyanar is given to these falls because there is a small forest temple named Ayyanar Temple beside the falls.

== Neer Katha Aiyyanar temple ==
The Neer Katha Ayyanar temple is the main reason for the name of the falls. The temple is situated at the foothills of Western Ghats where two rivers, Palaru and Neeraru meet. It is more than 500 years old. Devotees approach Ayyanar for solutions to family problems. Realizing their expectations, devotees perform abishek to Ayyanar, feed the poor and contribute what they can to the temple.

=== Floods ===
Sudden floods in the rainy season sometimes result in people being stuck in the temple. Fire fighters from Rajapalayam rescue the people and help them to cross the river safely. Visitors are not allowed at the falls during heavy rain.

== 6th Mile Dam reservoir ==
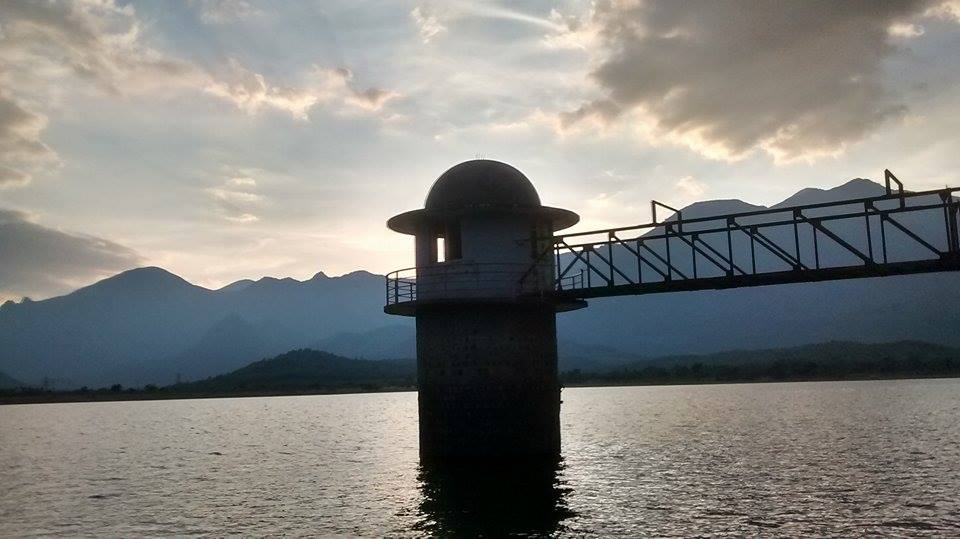
6th Mile Dam in Rajapalayam

The 6th Mile Dam reservoir is supplied by falls. The reservoir is six miles (10 km) from Rajapalayam and is the main water source for the city and neighbouring villages, and for irrigation. It also a major tourist attraction. A water treatment plant is situated near the water reservoir. Many Tamil films such as Kutti Puli are shot near the dam.

== Tourism ==
Ayyanar Falls are among many cascades in southern Tamil Nadu. Other tourist destinations in the area are Ayyanar Kovil, a dam near the falls, Srivilliputtur, Ayyanar Koil Forest area, Sri Vallakattu Karuppasamy Kovil, Sanjeevi Hills and Shenbagathoppu Grizzled Squirrel Wildlife Sanctuary. Tourism is the main source of livelihood for people in neighbouring villages. The nearest airport to the falls is at Madurai.

== See also ==
- List of waterfalls
- List of waterfalls in India
