= Alamparai Fort =

Fort in Tamil Nadu, India

Alamparai Rock Fort
- Part of History of Tamil Nadu
- Kadappakkam
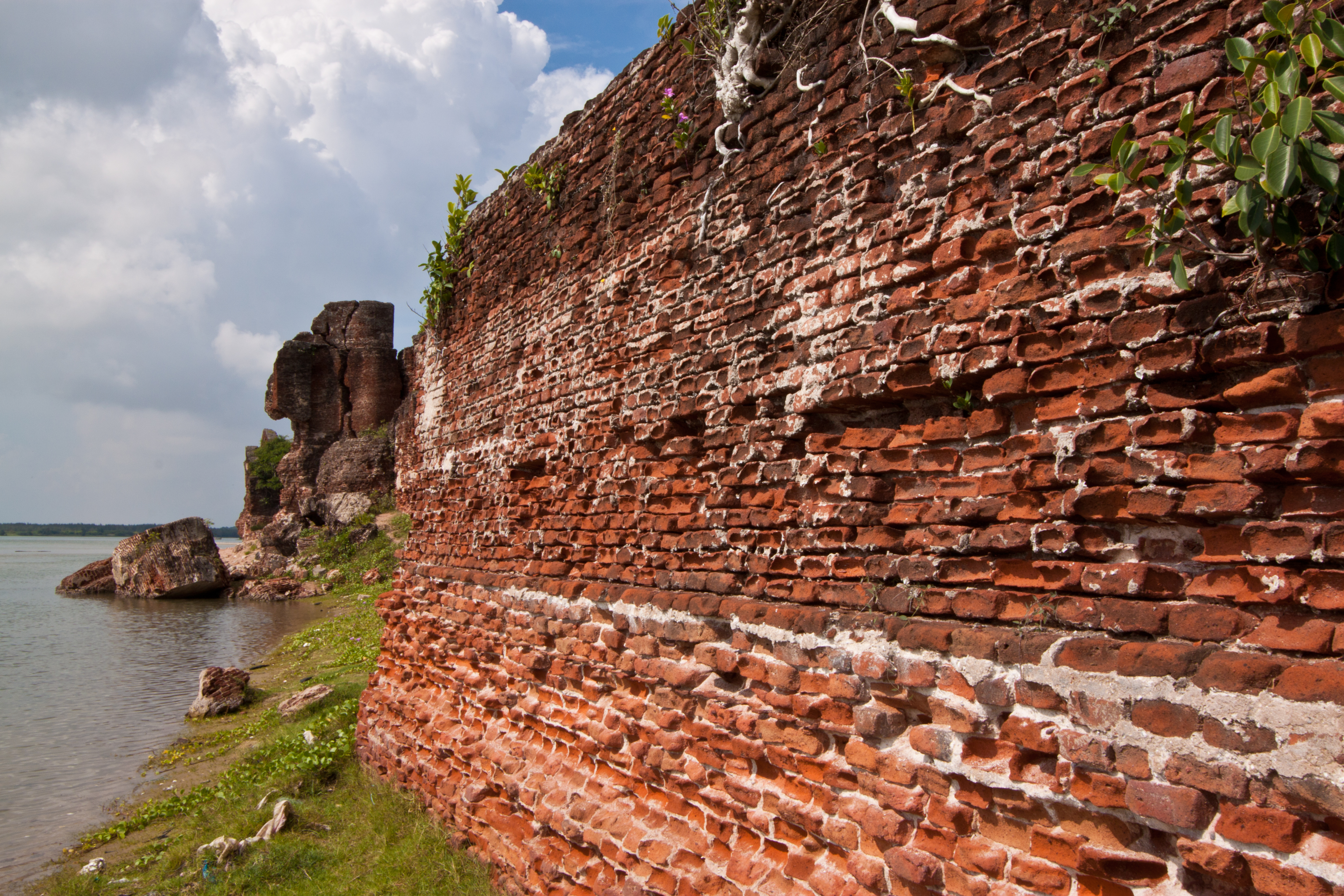

Site information
- Controlled by: Department of Archaeology, Government of Tamil Nadu
- Open to the public: No
- Condition: Ruins
- Website: http://www.tnarch.gov.in/default.htm

Location
- Location within Tamil Nadu
- Coordinates: 12.2659°N 80.0101°E

Site history
- Built: 1735
- Materials: Granite

The ruins of Alamparai Fort (also called Alampara) lie near Kadappakkam in India, a village 50 km from Mamallapuram on the land overlooking the sea. Constructed in the late 17th century during the Mughal era, the Alamparai Fort once had a 100-metre long dockyard stretching into the sea, from which zari cloth, salt, and ghee were exported. During 1735 AD it was ruled by Nawab Doste Ali Khan. In 1750, for the services rendered by the famous French commander Dupleix to Subedar Muzaffar Jung, the fort was given to the French. When French were defeated by the British, the fort was captured and demolished in 1760 AD. More recently the structure was damaged in the 2004 Indian Ocean earthquake.

== History ==
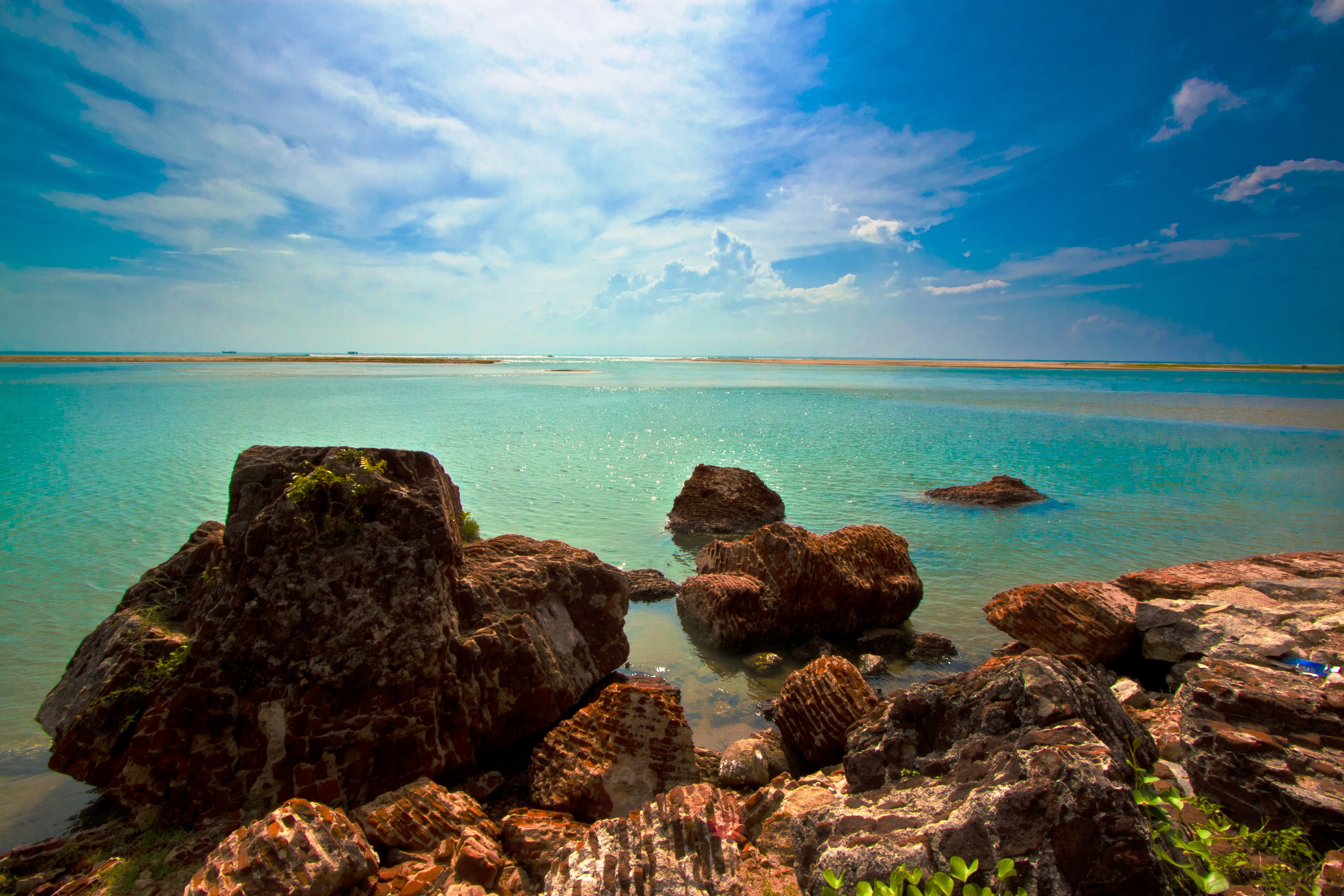
Remains of Alamparai Fort in Bay of Bengal

Alamparai was a seaport in historical times. The place had other names like Idaikazhinadu, Alamparva and Alampuravi. The fort was built during the Mughal era between 1736 and 1740 AD. The fort was initially under the control of the Nawab of Arcot, Doste Ali Khan, and was later given to the French. After the Carnatic wars, when the French lost to British, the fort came under the direct control of the British and was demolished in 1760.

Alamparai is mentioned in several places in the diaries of Ananda Ranga Pillai, Dubash to Dupleix in French India. It was the primary port of trade for the Arcot nawabs. They had a mint there, and later, at the request of Dumas, the governor of Madras Presidency, The People who worked in the Mints of Alambarai (it is mentioned as 'Alampuravi') moved to Pondicherry and established a mint with the approval of the Nawab of Arcot. It was a regular port of call on the Coromandel Coast, having a 100 m (330 ft) dockyard. The other contemporary ports were Pulicat, Madras, Mylapore, Sadras (12 km from Mahabalipuram), Pondicherry, Cuddalore, Porto Nova, Tharangambadi (Tranquebar), Karaikal, and Nagapattinam. The fort experienced further damages during the Indian Ocean tsunami in 2004 and portions of the dilapidated fort remains under the sea. A team of archaeologists found out coins minted during the rule of Nawabs. Some rare artifacts like the arms and ammunition used by the Nawabs and French were also found in fort.

== Architecture ==
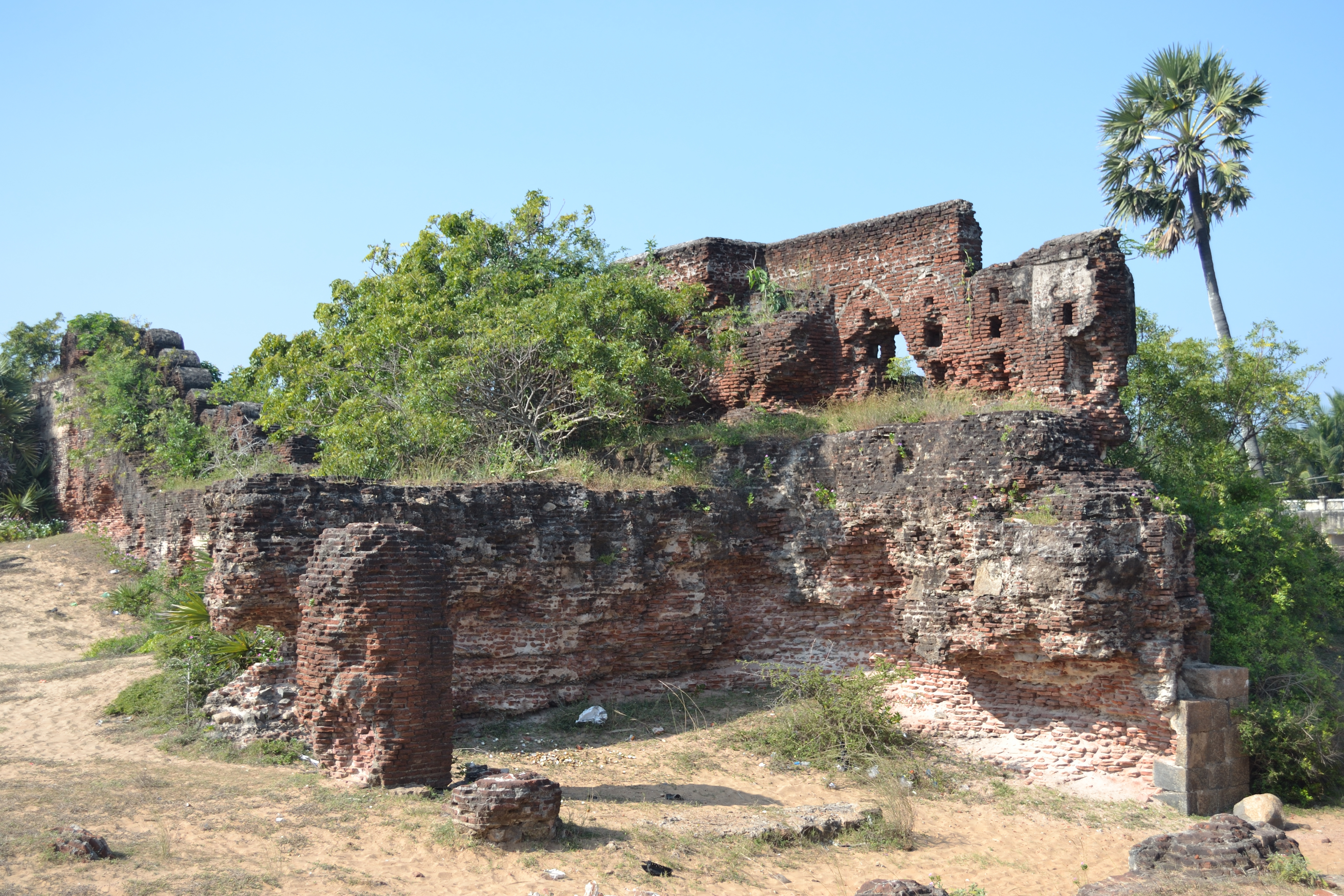
Ruins of Alamparai Fort Walls

The fort can be reached on driving down the East Coast Road, about 100 km (62 mi) from Chennai, 5 km (3.1 mi) from Vedal and 50 km (31 mi) from Pondicherry (Puducherry). Local fishermen assist tourists in a boating experience around the fort. The fort covers an area of 15 acres (0.061 km^{2}). The fort is built of bricks and limestone and at its centre there is a mausoleum. There are tall walls around the fort and brick steps lead to the top. The watch tower from the fort provides good view of the surroundings.

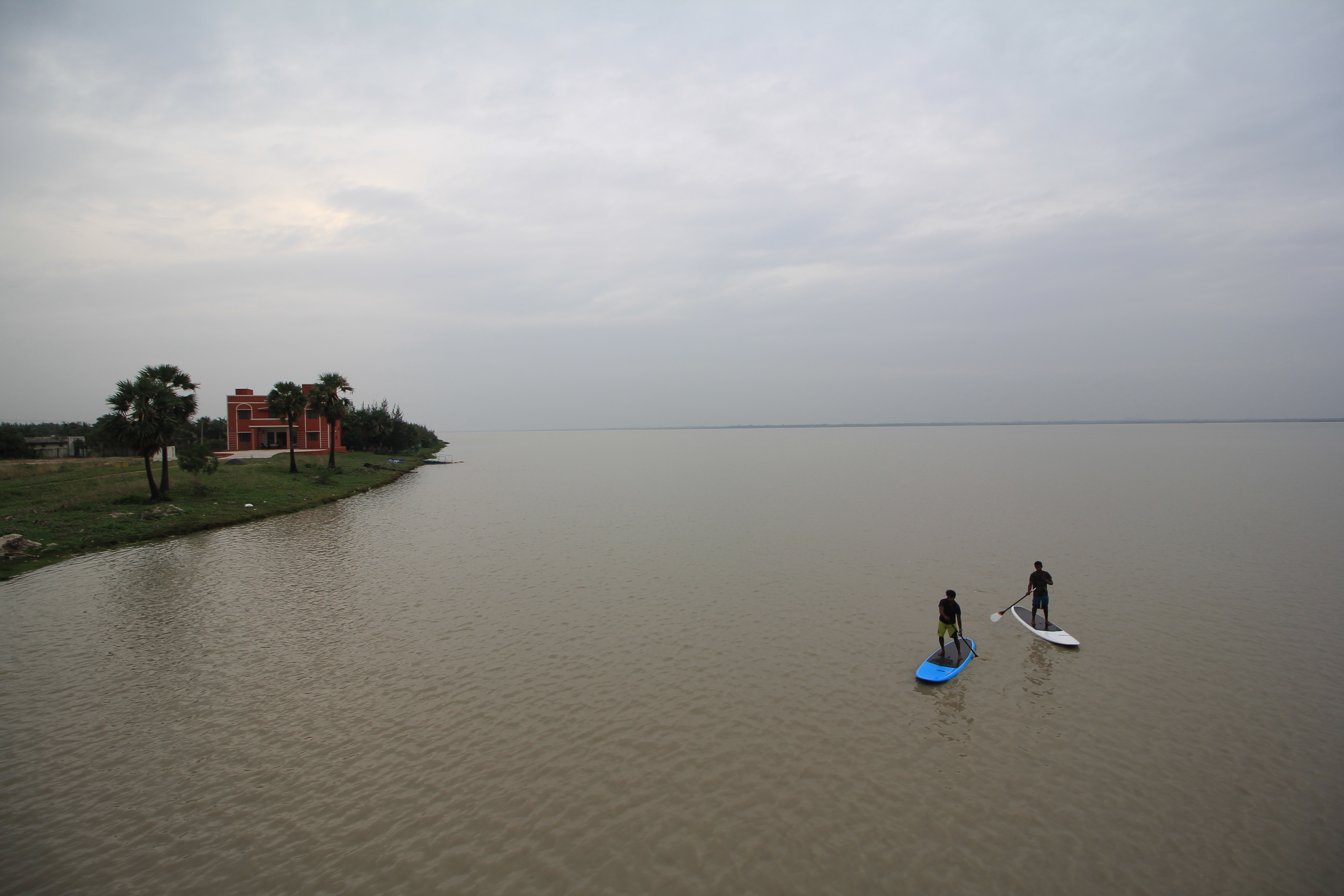
Standup Paddleboarding near Alamparai Fort

== Culture ==
There are references to the region in Sangam literature Ciṟupāṇāṟṟuppaṭai as a trade post. As of 2011, the fort received an average of 25,000 visitors every year. The Tamil Nadu Tourism Development Corporation (TTDC) listed the fort as one of twenty lesser known tourist spots in the state. The Corporation listed the fort in the international tourism fair held at Berlin. The fort is pictured in several commercials and cinema. Portions of Pithamagan, a 2003 Tamil film, starring popular actors Suriya and Vikram, was shot in the fort.
