= List of rock-cut monuments in Tamil Nadu =

Tamil Nadu has a large number of Rock-cut monuments, including cave temples, mandapas, and shrines carved directly into natural rock formations. The state is home to at least 107 known rock-cut monuments. These monuments date mainly from the early historic and medieval periods and are associated with dynasties such as the Pallavas and Pandyas. They represent important developments in Dravidian architecture and religious traditions including Hinduism and Jainism.

S.No	Name	Location	District	Coordinates
1	Pallavaram Dargha	Pallavaram Hill	Chengalpattu	12°58′17″N 80°9′38″E
2	Karivaradharaja Perumal Temple (Vallam – 1)	Vallam	Chengalpattu	12°40′53″N 79°59′46″E
3	Vethantheeswarar Temple (Vallam – 2)	Vallam	Chengalpattu	12°40′54″N 79°59′46″E
4	Vallam – 3	Vallam	Chengalpattu	12°40′54″N 79°59′46″E
5	Padalathri Narasimhar Temple	Singaperumal Koil	Chengalpattu	12°45′37″N 80°0′15″E
6	Rock-cut Cave opposite Ramanujar Mandabam (Unfinished)	Mamallapuram	Chengalpattu	
7	Lighthouse Rock-cut Cave (Unfinished)	Mamallapuram	Chengalpattu	12°36′55″N 80°11′31″E
8	Puliputhar Mandabam Rock-cut Cave	Mamallapuram	Chengalpattu	
9	Koneri Mandabam – 1	Mamallapuram	Chengalpattu	12°37′8″N 80°11′28″E
10	Koneri Mandabam – 2	Mamallapuram	Chengalpattu	12°37′7″N 80°11′28″E
11	Panchapandava Cave Temple	Mamallapuram	Chengalpattu	12°37′4″N 80°11′33″E
12	Dharmaraja Mandapam	Mamallapuram	Chengalpattu	12°36′53″N 80°11′30″E
13	Kotravai (Kodikkal) Rock-cut Cave	Mamallapuram	Chengalpattu	12°37′11″N 80°11′32″E
14	Ramanuja Mandapam	Mamallapuram	Chengalpattu	12°36′59″N 80°11′31″E
15	Mahishamardini Rock-cut Cave	Mamallapuram	Chengalpattu	12°36′54″N 80°11′29″E
16	Trimurti Rock-cut Cave Temple	Mamallapuram	Chengalpattu	12°37′11″N 80°11′34″E
17	Varaha Cave Temple	Mamallapuram	Chengalpattu	12°37′5″N 80°11′32″E
18	Peruvarahar Rock-cut Cave (Adivaraha cave temple)	Mamallapuram	Chengalpattu	12°36′51.825″N 80°11′26.060″E
19	Orukkal Mandapam	Tirukalukundram	Chengalpattu	12°36′35″N 80°3′34″E
20	Atiranachanda Cave Temple	Saluvankuppam	Chengalpattu	12°39′28″N 80°12′35″E
21	Yali Mandabam	Saluvankuppam	Chengalpattu	12°39′21.36″N 80°12′32.599″E
22	Rock-cut Cave (Unfinished)	Koothampoondiyanvalasu	Dindigul	10°34′1″N 77°36′49″E
23	Kalyana Venkataramanaswamy Temple (Thanthoni – 1)	Thanthoni	Karur	10°56′14″N 78°5′23″E
24	Thanthoni – 2	Thanthoni	Karur	
25	Thirunanthikarai Rock-cut Shiva Temple	Thirunanthikarai	Kanyakumari	8°23′55″N 77°17′52″E
26	Bhoothalingaswamy Temple	Boothapandi	Kanyakumari	8°15′48″N 77°26′56″E
27	Auvai Raman Temple	Kurathiarai	Kanyakumari	8°17′53″N 77°26′56″E
28	Sivagiri Mahadevar Temple	Alwarkoyil	Kanyakumari	8°13′0″N 77°19′19″E
29	Rock-cut Siva Cave Temple	Arittapatti	Madurai	10°2′25″N 78°16′34″E
30	Rock-cut Cave (Unfinished)	Mangulam	Madurai	10°1′30″N 78°14′33″E
31	Udhayagiriwarar Temple	Kunnathur	Madurai	9°54′14″N 78°15′15″E
32	Asthagiriswarar Temple	Kunnathur	Madurai	9°54′12″N 78°15′7″E
33	Neelakanteswarar Temple	Kunnathur	Madurai	9°54′9″N 78°14′53″E
34	Ladan Rock-cut Cave Temple	Othakadai	Madurai	9°57′59″N 78°11′21″E
35	Narasingam Yoga Narasimha Perumal Temple	Othakadai	Madurai	9°57′59″N 78°11′21″E
36	Thirupparankundram Rock-cut Cave	Thirupparankundram	Madurai	9°52′27″N 78°4′15″E
37	Subramaniya Swamy Temple	Thirupparankundram	Madurai	9°52′45″N 78°4′16″E
38	Narasimhaswamy Temple	Namakkal	Namakkal	11°13′20″N 78°9′52″E
39	Ranganatha Perumal Temple	Namakkal	Namakkal	11°13′23″N 78°9′57″E
40	Rock-cut Shiva Cave Temple – 1	Kunnandarkoil	Pudukkottai	10°34′56″N 78°53′52″E
41	Rock-cut Shiva Cave Temple – 2	Kunnandarkoil	Pudukkottai	
42	Rock-cut Shiva Cave Temple – 3	Kunnandarkoil	Pudukkottai	
43	Olipathi Vishnu Griham	Malayadipatti	Pudukkottai	10°39′15″N 78°53′49″E
44	Rock-cut Cave Shiva Temple	Malayadipatti	Pudukkottai	10°39′15″N 78°53′48″E
45	Padhinen Bhumi Vinnagaram (Rock-cut Vishnu Temple)	Narthamalai	Pudukkottai	10°30′18″N 78°45′27″E
46	Palyyili Eswaram (Rock-cut Shiva Temple)	Narthamalai	Pudukkottai	10°30′17″N 78°45′27″E
47	Pushpavaneswarar Temple	Poovalakudi	Pudukkottai	10°20′2″N 78°37′32″E
48	Sathyagirisvarar Temple	Thirumayam	Pudukkottai	10°14′49″N 78°45′6″E
49	Sathyamurthi Perumal Temple	Thirumayam	Pudukkottai	10°14′48″N 78°45′7″E
50	Rock-cut Shiva Temple	Thirumayam	Pudukkottai	10°14′51″N 78°45′3″E
51	Kokarneswarar Temple	Thirukokarnam	Pudukkottai	10°23′31″N 78°48′2″E
52	Rock-cut Cave Siva Temple	Devar Malai	Pudukkottai	10°21′13″N 78°44′15″E
53	Seevaramudiyaar Rock-cut Cave Temple	Malayakkoyil	Pudukkottai	10°20′8″N 78°42′46″E
54	Thiruvarul Kaleesvarar Subramanaswamy Temple	Malayakkoyil	Pudukkottai	10°20′8″N 78°42′45″E
55	MalaiKoluntheeswarar Temple	Ayingudi	Pudukkottai	10°14′22″N 78°48′29″E
56	Rock-cut Cave Shiva Temple	Kulalakkottaiyur	Pudukkottai	10°15′3″N 78°47′50″E
57	Arivar Koil	Sittanavasal	Pudukkottai	10°27′21″N 78°43′31″E
58	Rock-cut Cave Temple	Mangudi	Pudukkottai	10°24′52″N 78°42′54″E
59	Melakovil Rock-cut Cave Temple	Kudumiyanmalai	Pudukkottai	10°24′59″N 78°39′31″E
60	Mahendravadi rock cut temple (Mahendra Vishnu Griham)	Mahendravadi	Ranipet	12°59′22″N 79°32′30″E
61	Pallava Rock-cut Cave	Vilapakkam	Ranipet	12°51′57″N 79°16′47″E
62	Karpaka Vinayakar Temple	Pillayarpatti	Sivaganga	10°7′9″N 78°40′3″E
63	Rock-cut Cave Siva Temple	Mahibalanpatti	Sivaganga	10°11′19″N 78°33′52″E
64	Rock-cut Siva Cave Temple, Kundrakudi – 1	Kundrakudi	Sivaganga	10°6′52″N 78°41′55″E
65	Rock-cut Siva Cave Temple, Kundrakudi – 2	Kundrakudi	Sivaganga	
66	Rock-cut Siva Cave Temple, Kundrakudi – 3	Kundrakudi	Sivaganga	
67	Kodunkundreeswar Temple	Piranmalai	Sivaganga	10°14′20″N 78°26′22″E
68	Kagholapureeswarar Temple	Thirukolakudi	Sivaganga	10°15′25″N 78°37′39″E
69	Rock-cut Siva Cave Temple	Aralipatti	Sivaganga	10°10′20″N 78°29′53″E
70	MalaiKoluntheeswarar Temple	Thirumalai	Sivaganga	9°59′25″N 78°28′16″E
71	Courtallam Rock-cut Cave	Courtallam	Tenkasi	
72	Rock-cut Cave Temple	Malayadikkurichi	Tenkasi	9°12′21″N 77°25′57″E
73	Kailasanathar Temple	Veerasigamani	Tenkasi	9°5′53″N 77°26′19″E
74	Pasupatheswarar Temple	Tirumalapuram	Tenkasi	9°4′31″N 77°24′28″E
75	Rock-cut Cave (Unfinished)	Tirumalapuram	Tenkasi	9°4′31″N 77°24′29″E
76	Yoga Dhatchinaamoorthy Temple	Anaiyoor	Tenkasi	9°12′38″N 77°30′48″E
77	Rock-cut Cave Temple	Sokkampatti	Tenkasi	9°7′55″N 77°19′1″E
78	Valli Rock-cut Cave	Thiruchendur	Thoothukudi	8°29′50″N 78°7′48″E
79	Xavier Rock-cut Cave	Manapad	Thoothukudi	8°22′25″N 78°4′4″E
80	Vettuvan Koil	Kalugumalai	Thoothukudi	9°9′11″N 77°42′16″E
81	Kalugasalamoorthy temple	Kalugumalai	Thoothukudi	9°8′57.94″N 77°42′12.23″E
82	Lalitankura Pallavesvara Griham (Trichy Upper Cave)	Tiruchirappalli Rock Fort	Tiruchirappalli	10°49′42″N 78°41′49″E
83	Trichy Lower Cave	Tiruchirappalli Rock Fort	Tiruchirappalli	10°49′40″N 78°41′47″E
84	Neelivaneswarar Temple	Thiruppaigngneeli	Tiruchirappalli	10°56′9″N 78°38′30″E
85	Pundarikakshan Perumal Temple	Thiruvallarai	Tiruchirappalli	10°57′20″N 78°40′4″E
86	Vada Jambunathar Temple	Thiruvellarai	Tiruchirappalli	10°57′22″N 78°40′22″E
87	Andichiparai Rock Cut Cave Temple	Pathinalamperi	Tirunelveli	8°49′20″N 77°47′31″E
88	Subramanya Swamy Temple	Valliyur	Tirunelveli	8°22′49.35″N 77°36′53.09″E
89	Mamandur – 1	Narasamangalam	Tiruvannamalai	12°44′27″N 79°39′54″E
90	Mamandur – 2	Narasamangalam	Tiruvannamalai	12°44′39″N 79°39′57″E
91	Mamandur – 3	Narasamangalam	Tiruvannamalai	12°44′30″N 79°39′56″E
92	Mamandur – 4	Narasamangalam	Tiruvannamalai	12°44′27″N 79°39′56″E
93	Avanibhajana Pallaveshwaram Temple	Seeyamangalam	Tiruvannamalai	12°25′53″N 79°27′57″E
94	Kal Mandagathu Alwar	Kuranganilmuttam	Tiruvannamalai	12°46′4″N 79°41′33″E
95	Guhai Varadaraja Perumal Temple	Avur	Tiruvannamalai	12°7′50″N 79°12′16″E
96	Rock-cut Cave (Unfinished)	Thirakoil	Tiruvannamalai	12°27′5″N 79°29′52″E
97	Ninra Narayana Perumal temple	Thiruthangal	Virudhunagar	9°28′55″N 77°48′41″E
98	Velliyambalanathar Temple	Paraikulam	Virudhunagar	9°32′2″N 78°10′56″E
99	Rock-cut Cave Temple	Sevalpatti	Virudhunagar	9°18′25″N 77°42′52″E
100	MalaiKoluntheeswarar Temple	Moovaraivendran	Virudhunagar	9°37′22″N 77°43′2″E
101	Rock-cut Siva Cave Temple	M. Pudhupatti	Virudhunagar	9°32′54″N 77°46′53″E
102	Lakshitha Yathanam	Mandagapattu	Viluppuram	12°6′28″N 79°27′24″E
103	Sathrumalleswaram Rockcut Temple	Dhalavanur	Viluppuram	12°10′0″N 79°28′7″E
104	Sikhari Pallaveshvaram Temple	Melacheri	Viluppuram	12°17′18″N 79°23′43″E
105	Senji Singavaram Ranganatha Temple	Singavaram	Viluppuram	12°16′34″N 79°23′55″E
106	Pallava Rock-cut Cave	Kilmavilangai	Viluppuram	12°19′34″N 79°36′21″E
107	Pandava Cave Temple	Arakandanallur	Viluppuram	11°58′25″N 79°13′14″E

== See also ==
- Indian rock-cut architecture
- List of rock-cut temples in India
- Rock relief

== Sources ==
- சு., இராசவேல்; அ. கி., சேஷாத்திரி (2000). தமிழ்நாட்டுக் குடைவரைக் கோயில்கள். சென்னை: பண்பாட்டு வெளியீட்டகம்.
- மு., நளினி; இரா., கலைக்கோவன் (2004). மகேந்திர குடைவரைகள். சென்னை: சேகர் பதிப்பகம்.
- மு., நளினி; இரா., கலைக்கோவன் (2012). மாமல்லபுரம் குடைவரைகள். சென்னை: சேகர் பதிப்பகம். ISBN 978-81-907788-6-2.
- மு., நளினி; இரா., கலைக்கோவன் (2012). பல்லவர்- அதியர்- பாண்டியர் குடைவரைகள். சென்னை: சேகர் பதிப்பகம். ISBN 978-81-907790-0-5.
- மு., நளினி; இரா., கலைக்கோவன் (2007). தென்தமிழ்நாட்டுக் குடைவரைகள் தொகுதி 1. சென்னை: சேகர் பதிப்பகம்.
- மு., நளினி; இரா., கலைக்கோவன். தென்தமிழ்நாட்டுக் குடைவரைகள் தொகுதி- 2 - மதுரை மாவட்டக் குடைவரைகள். சென்னை: சேகர் பதிப்பகம்.
- மு., நளினி; இரா., கலைக்கோவன். தென்தமிழ்நாட்டுக் குடைவரைகள் தொகுதி- 3 - தென்மாவட்டக் குடைவரைகள். சென்னை: சேகர் பதிப்பகம்.
- மு., நளினி; இரா., கலைக்கோவன் (2012). தென்தமிழ்நாட்டுக் குடைவரைகள் தொகுதி- 4 - புதுக்கோட்டை மாவட்டக் குடைவரைகள். சென்னை: சேகர் பதிப்பகம்.
- The rock cut cave temple of south tamilnadu a study
