= Valliyur Moondru Yugam Kanda Amman Temple =

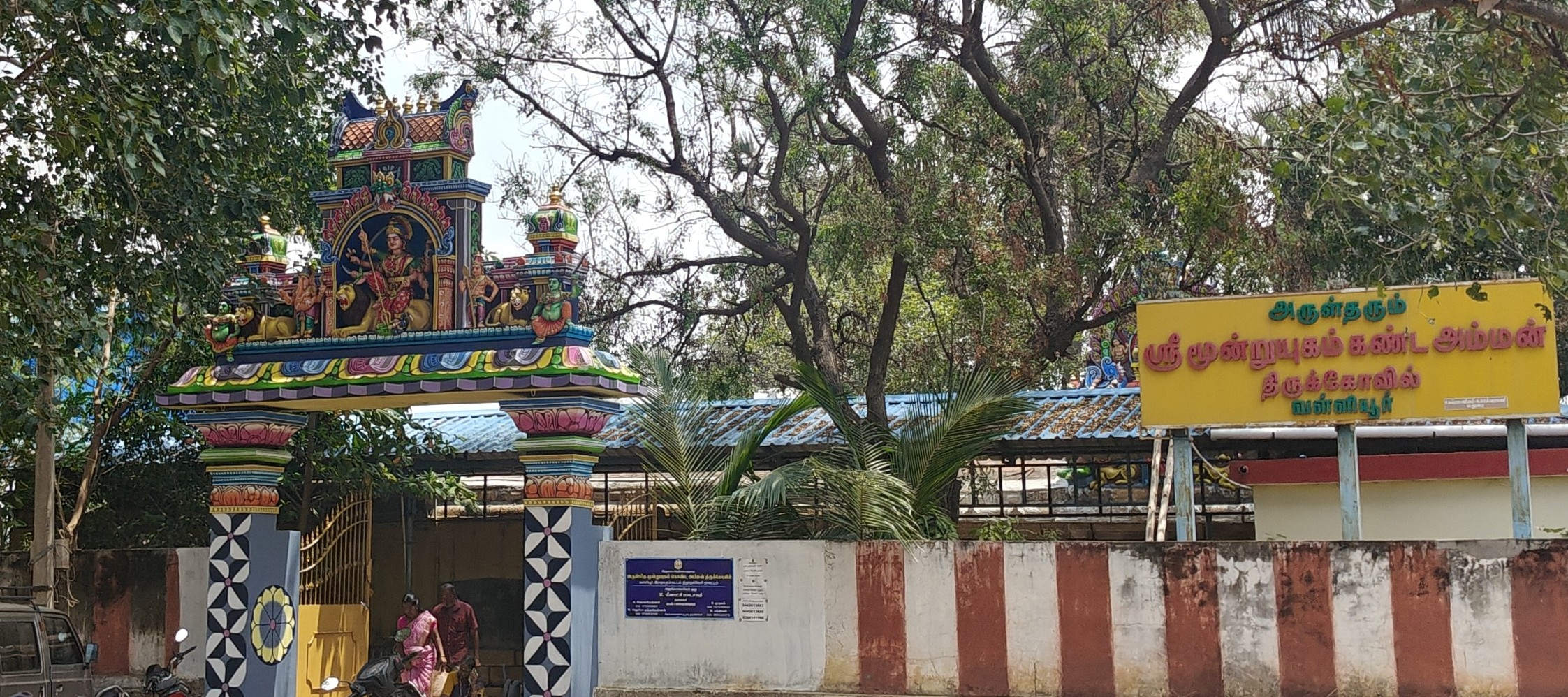

Moondru Yugam Kanda Amman Temple is a Hindu temple situated at Valliyur in Tirunelveli of Tamil Nadu, India.

== Presiding deity, other deities ==
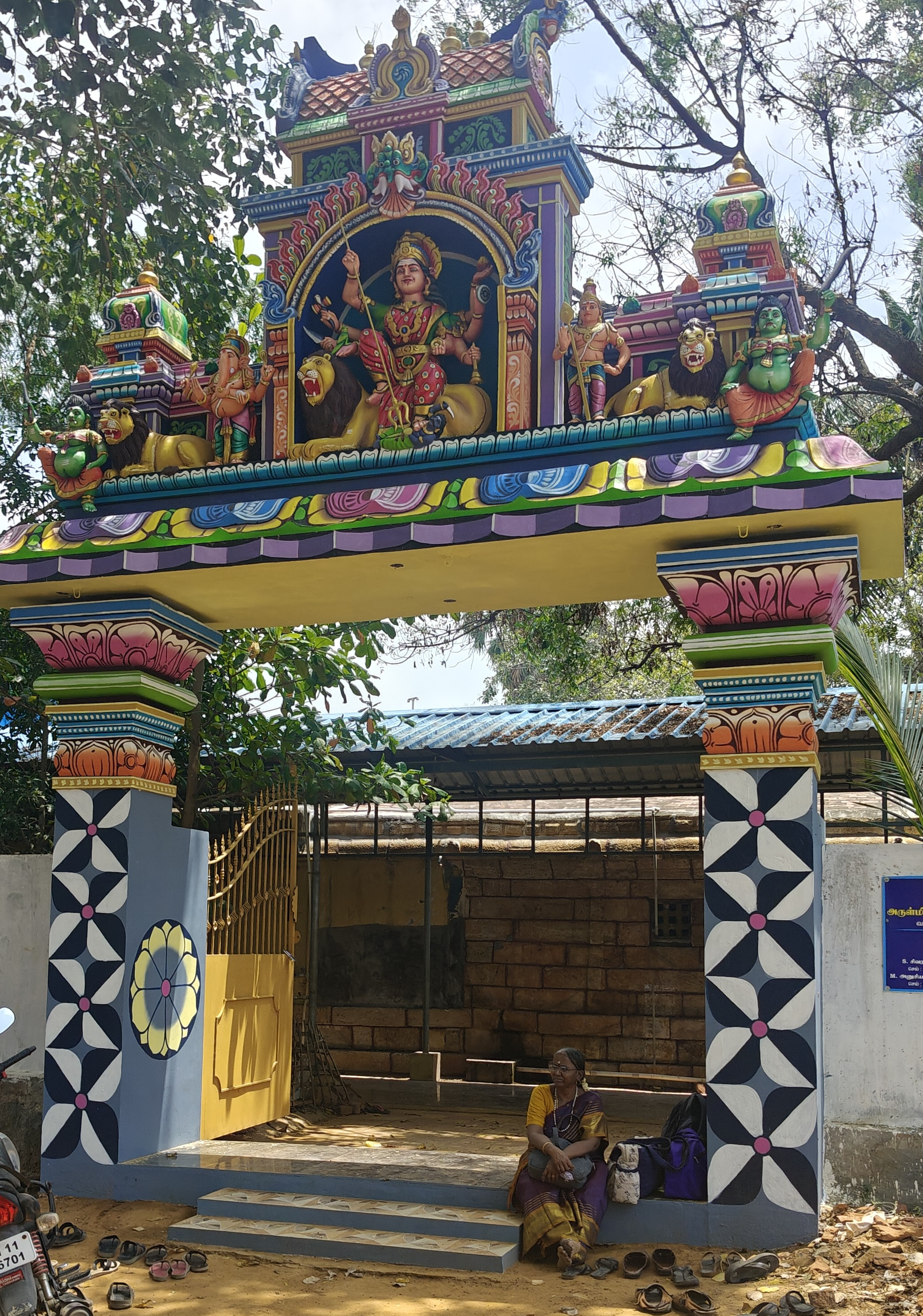
Entrance

The presiding deity, having four hands, is in sitting posture. Her left leg is found folded and her right leg is found hanging. Shiva and Parvati is known as Jayandeeswarar and Soundara Nayaki. She is in standing posture. Shiva is in the form of Linga

== The migrants ==
The deity is considered as the Kuladevata of the area. Due to various reasons the lcoals of the place shifted and settled in many places. They come and worship here every year.

== Festivals ==
During the first Tuesday of the Tamil month of Adi the presiding deity, kept on a pedestal, will be carried by the priest around the prakara of the temple. The devotees will offer fruits and eatables and would participate in the function. Once in a year they would come and sing the hymns of Abirami Antati to the accompaniment of music. They will offer saree to the deity and worship her.
