= Yanaimalai =

Hill in Tamil Nadu, India

Coordinates: 9.967477°N 78.192519°E

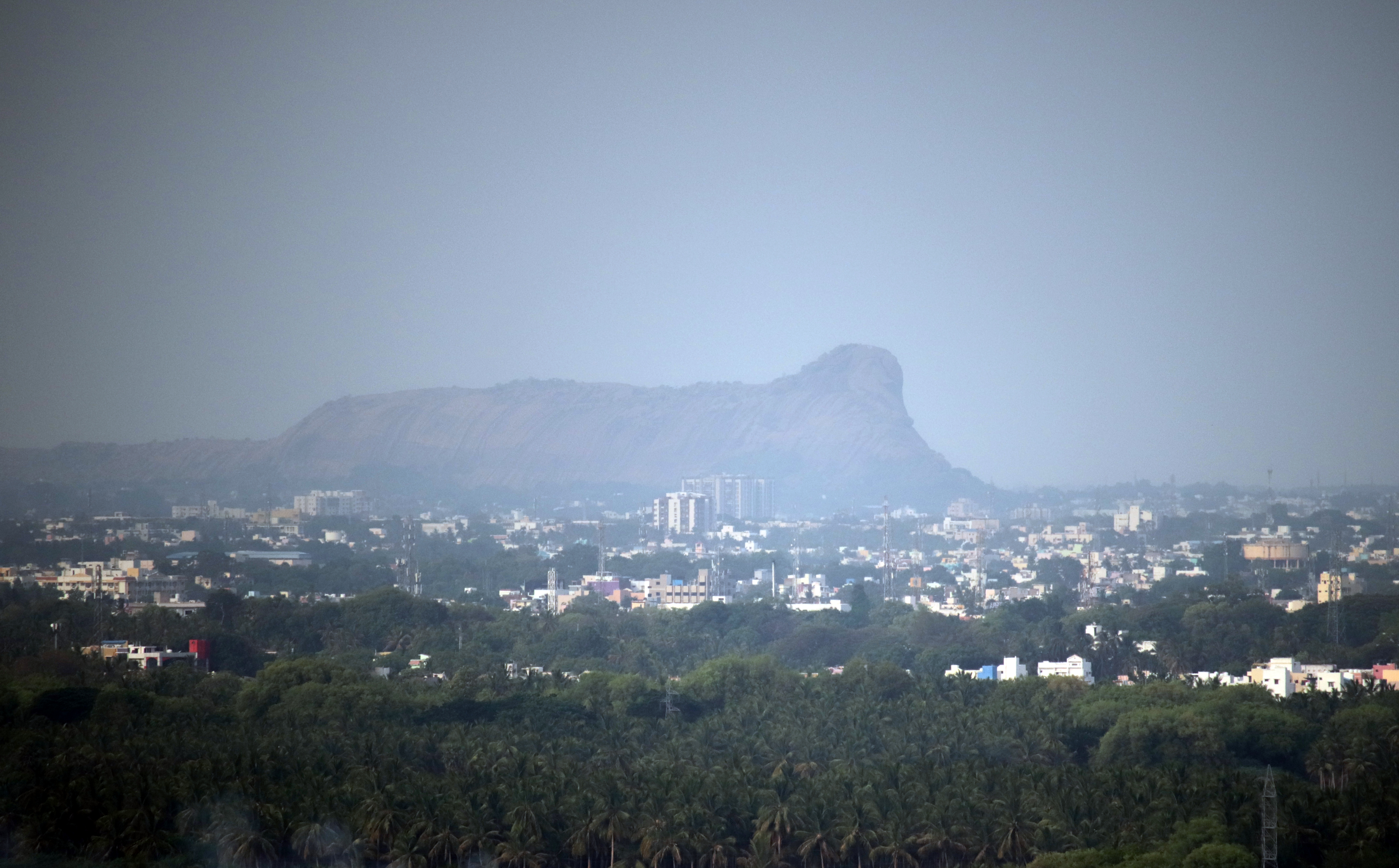
Yanaimalai as seen from top of Samanar Hills

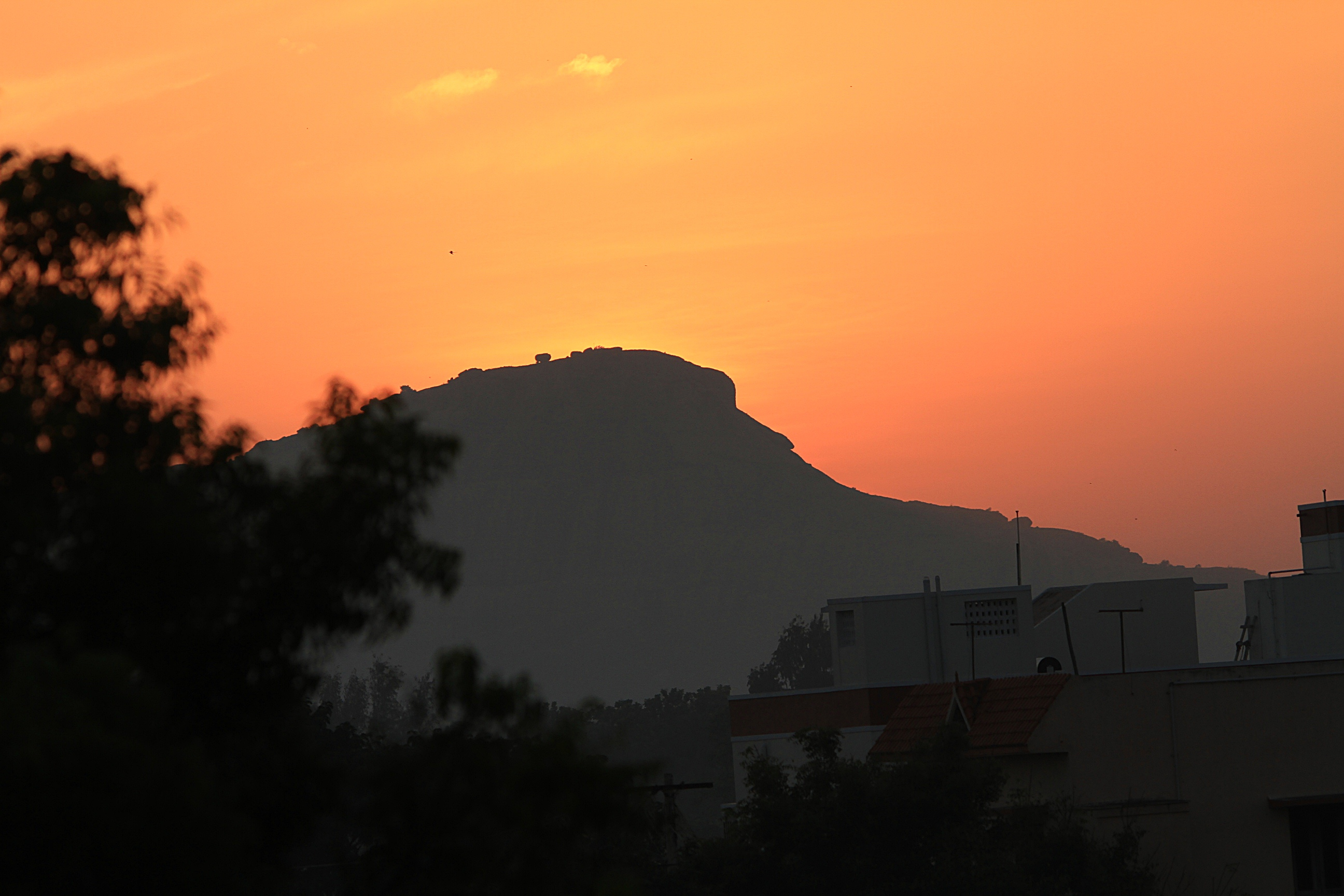
Yanaimalai (Elephant Hill)

Yanaimalai (Elephant Hill) is a protected monument and tourist attraction in Tamil Nadu, India. It has Jain sculptures, a Shaivite temple, and a Vaishnavite temple, namely the Narasingam Yoga Narasimha Perumal Temple.

== Etymology ==
The hill derives its name from the Tamil word yaanai, meaning "elephant", and malai, meaning "hill". The hill looks like an elephant in a sitting position. The site has had this name for over 2000 years.

== Location ==
Yanaimalai is located in Madurai District, Tamil Nadu, India. It is situated from 10 km from Madurai Mattuthavani bus stand. The hill stretches over 3 kilometres (1.9 mi) and is 90 metres (300 ft) high.

== About ==
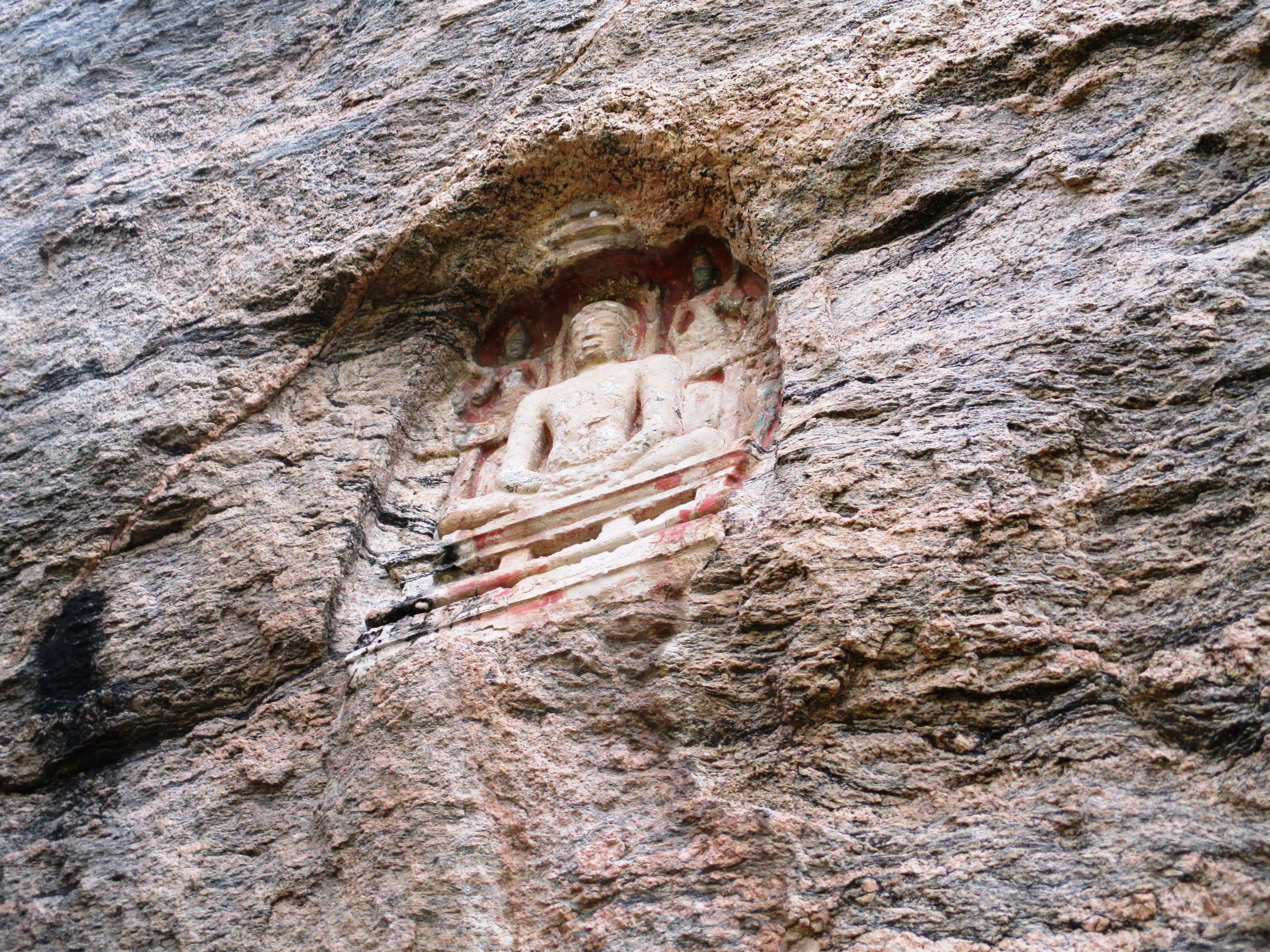
Jain Sculpture

Yanaimalai is considered a sacred place by the Tamil Jains. Jain monks lived here during the Pandyan Dynasty. The top of the hill caves containing Jain bas relief sculptures of Mahavira, Gomateshwara, and other tirthankaras fashioned by Jain monks, are found. There are also stone beds used by the monks for resting. Tamil-Brahmi and Vattelettu inscriptions can be found on the hill.

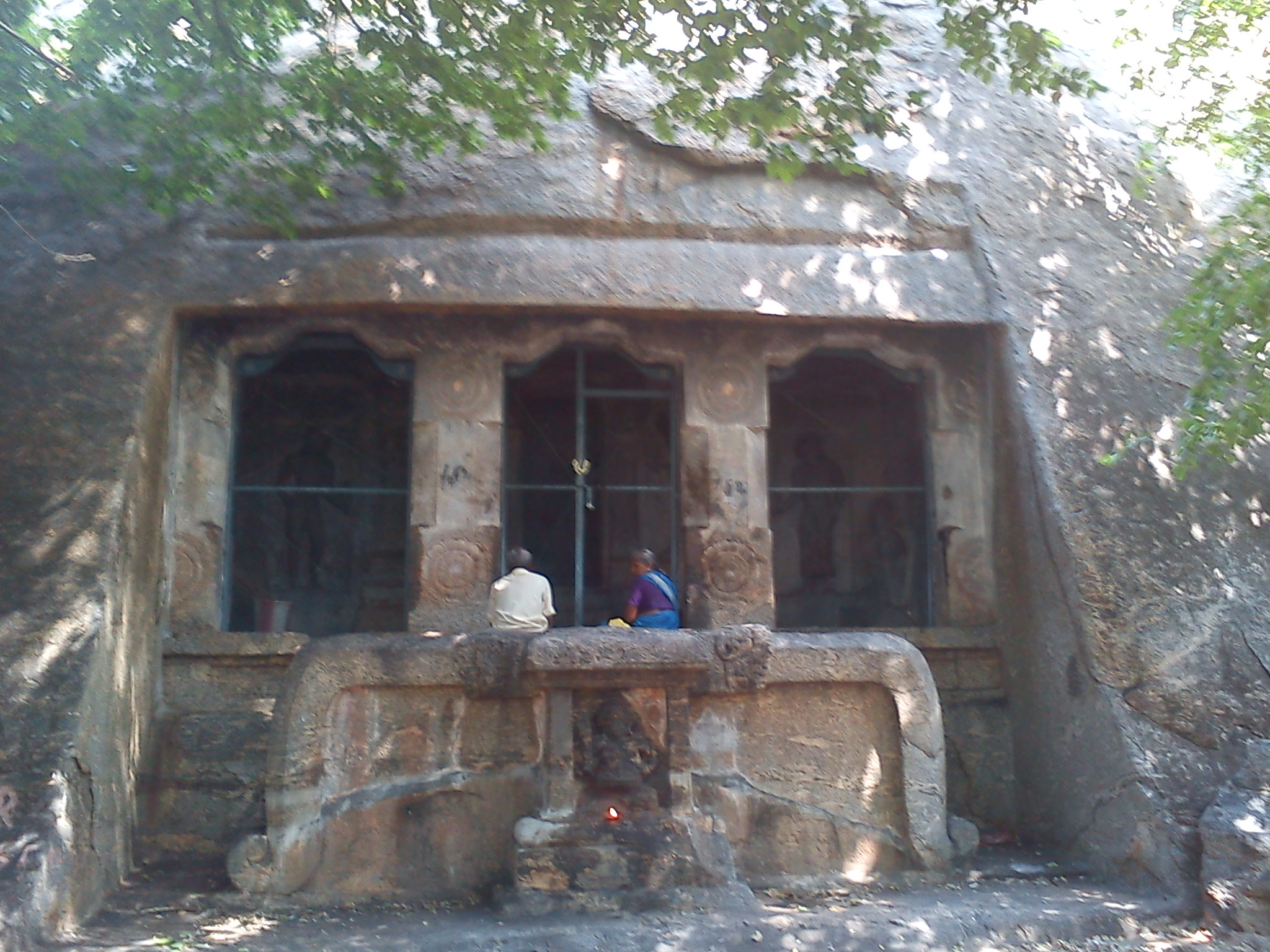
Ladan Cave Temple

Two Hindu temples are present in the foothills, one being the Ladan cave temple (Ladan koil), a Shaivite temple dedicated to Muruga, and the other being Yoga Narasimha temple, a Vaishnavite temple dedicated to Vishnu. Both are rock-cut temples constructed by the Pandyas, belonging to the 8th century. The place where the Ugra Narasimha temple is situated is known as Narasingam. Tamil-Brahmi and Vattelettu inscriptions in the temples shows their history. The Jain temple has been declared a protected monument by the Archaeological Survey of India.

The hill is rich in granite, and has been damaged by illegal quarrying. In 2010, the government of Tamil Nadu tried to set up a sculpture garden on the hill, but backed out after locals and activists protested against the idea.

== Gallery ==
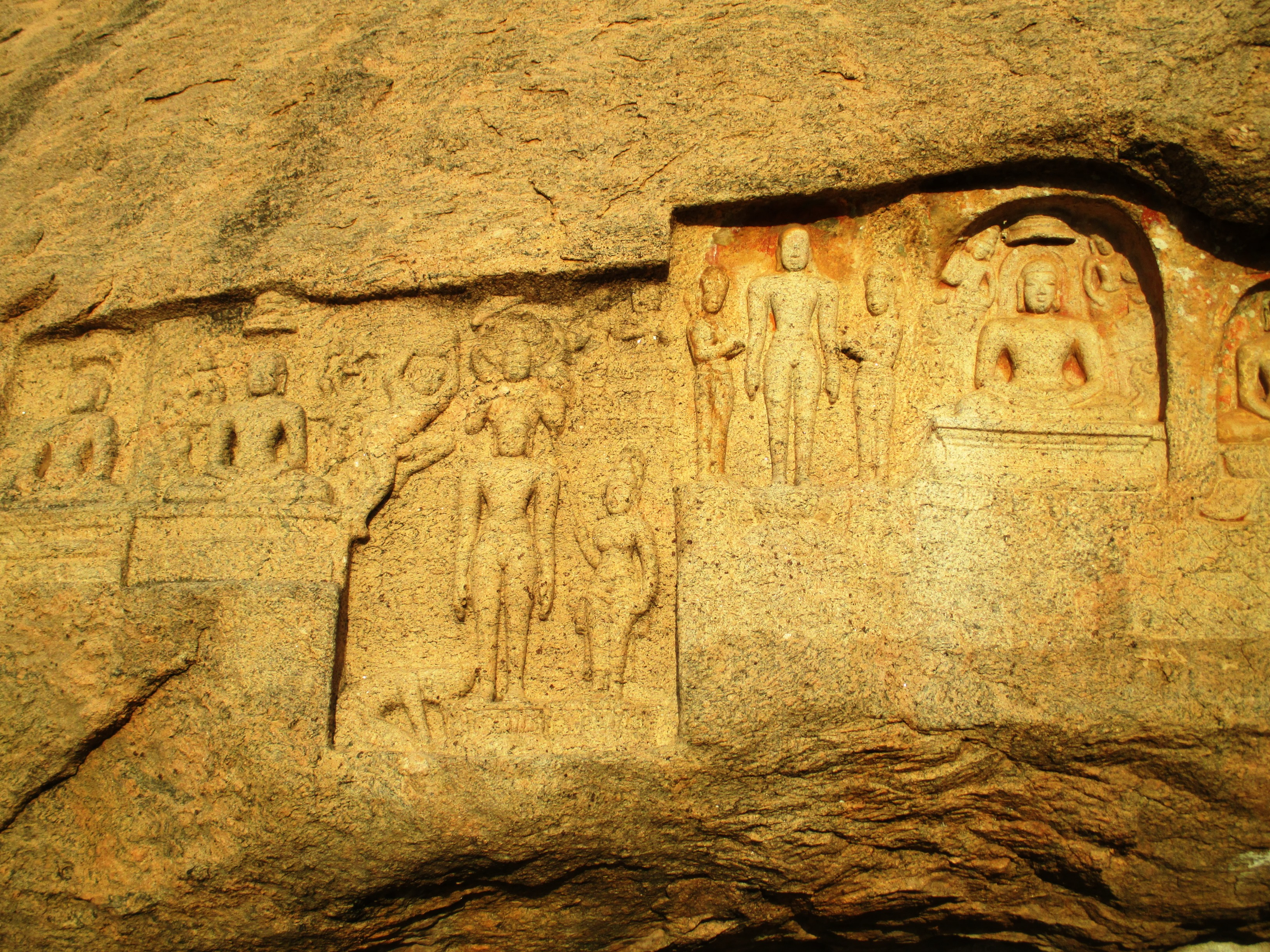
Jain Sculptures

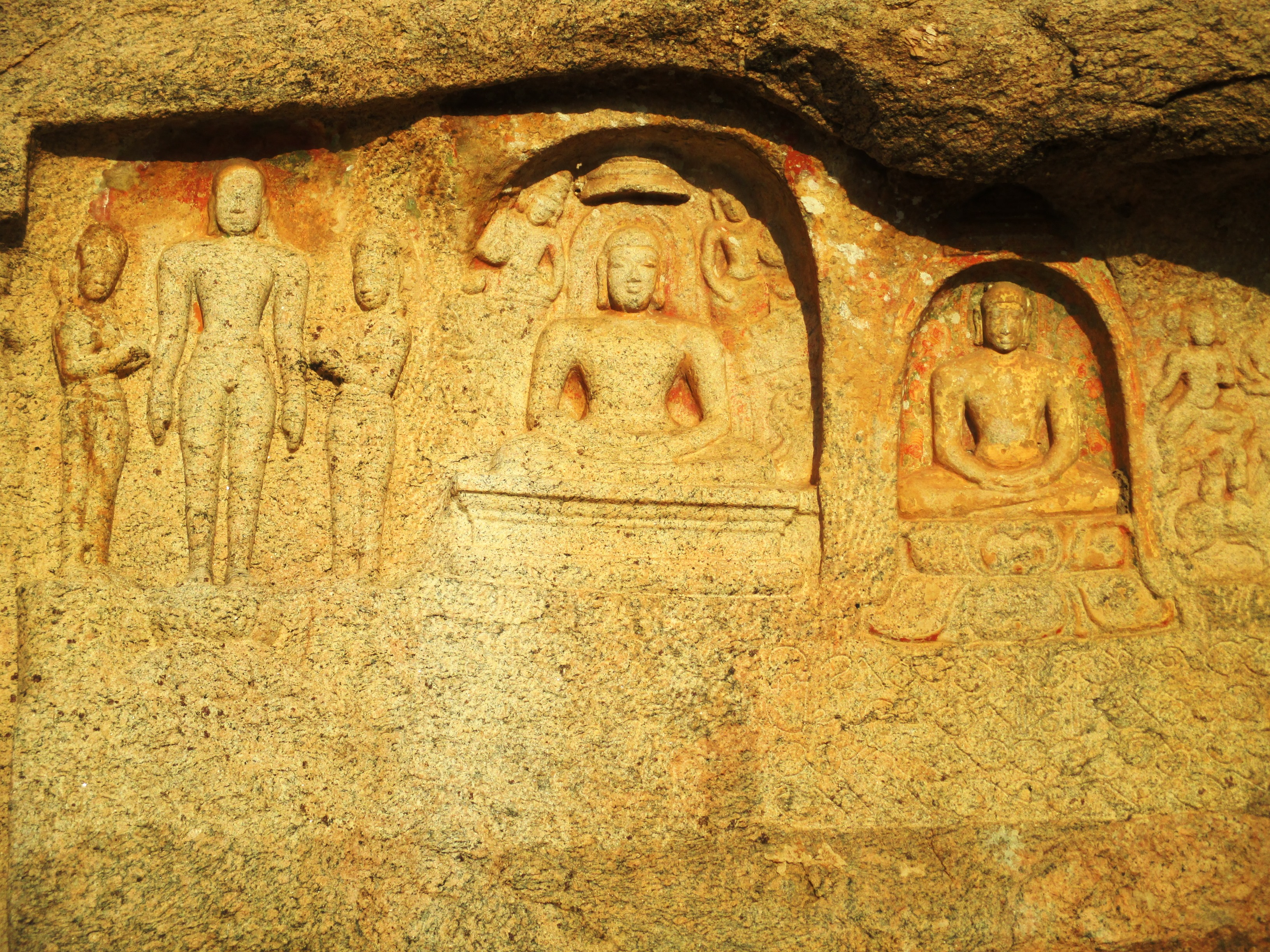
Jain Sculptures

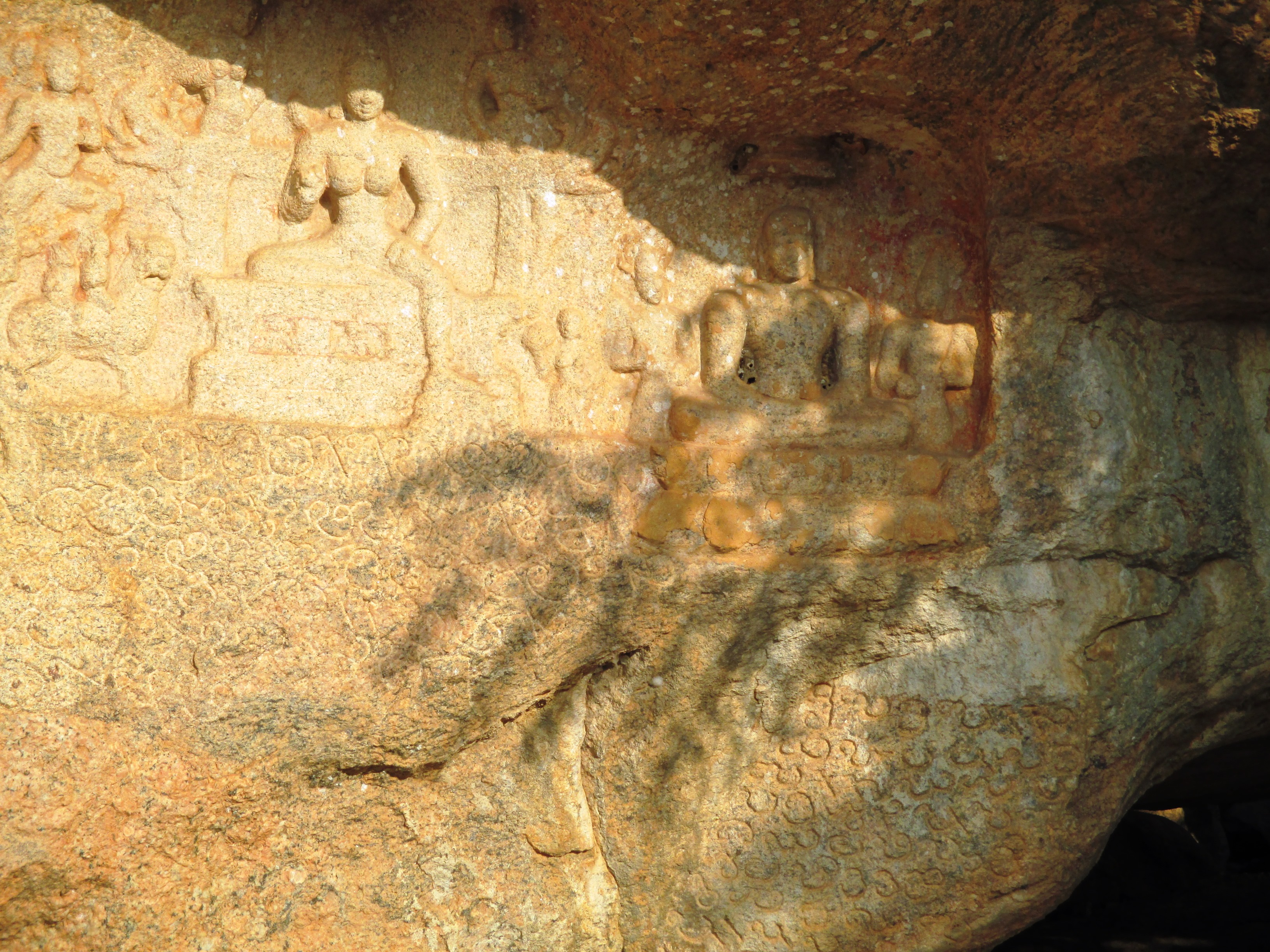
Jain Sculptures
