= V. G. Panneerdas =

Indian businessman

- Born: 4 August 1932; Azhagappapuram Valliyur, Thirunelveli District, Tamil Nadu, India
- Died: 7 May 1988 (aged 55)
- Citizenship: Indian
- Occupation: Founder of VGP Group of Companies
- Spouse: Parijatham
- Website: https://www.vgpgoldenbeachresort.co.in/

V. G. Panneerdas (4 August 1932 – 7 May 1988) was an Indian businessman and the founder of the VGP Group of Companies. Born in Azhagappapuram near Valliyur, Tirunelveli district, Tamil Nadu, he began his career in Chennai through small-scale employment and retail activities. Over the course of his career, he expanded his business interests into consumer goods, hire purchase,real estate and hospitality.

He is particularly associated with the establishment of VGP Golden Beach Resort, also known as Thanga Kadal Karai, on Chennai's East Coast Road in 1975.His early business initiatives and the establishment of Golden Beach formed important parts of the foundation of the VGP Group.

== Early career ==
V. G. Panneerdas came to Chennai from Azhagappapuram in search of work and better opportunities, carrying only ₹25 in his pocket. In his early years, he took up small jobs and worked in different forms of employment to support himself and his family. He worked in a provision shop and later became involved in small businesses, including a tea shop and newspaper vending. These years of work gave him experience in dealing with customers and managing small-scale business activities. In 1955, Panneerdas started a small shop dealing in alarm clocks, watches and wall clocks. The business was modest in its beginnings, but it gave him an opportunity to understand the needs of customers and the difficulties many families faced in purchasing household goods. He subsequently introduced an instalment-based purchasing system that allowed customers to obtain products and pay for them over a period of time. This became an important part of his early business and helped the retail operation grow.

As the business expanded, Panneerdas moved beyond a single retail outlet and developed a larger consumer-goods operation. The VGP name gradually became established in Chennai through its retail activities and instalment-based sales. The business continued to expand during the 1960s, laying the foundation for the wider VGP Group.

== Founding VGP Housing & Golden Beach ==
The next stage of V.G Panneerdas's career came with his entry into real estate. In the early 1970s, he expanded his business activities into housing through VGP Housing. One of its early developments was VGP Veerabhadra Nagar near Medavakkam, developed in 1972. The company also followed the instalment-based approach that had been used in his retail business, allowing property buyers to make payments over an agreed period.

The move into real estate was followed by the development that became closely associated with V. G Panneerdas's name. In 1975, he established VGP Golden Beach Resort on the East Coast Road in Chennai, at a time when the area was still developing as a leisure and tourism destination.

The property was developed around the coastal setting, with open spaces, gardens and accommodation. It gradually became a destination for families and visitors looking for a place to spend time within the city. The development also contributed to the early growth of the East Coast Road as a leisure corridor.

VGP Golden Beach, also known as Thanga Kadal Karai in the history of the VGP Group, became an important part of the group's business activities. Its development marked V. G Panneerdas's move from retail and housing into hospitality and leisure.

== Death ==
V. G. Panneerdas died of a heart attack on 7 May 1988, at the age of 55. From arriving in Chennai with ₹25 and taking up small jobs, he went on to build a business group spanning retail, housing, property development and hospitality. He was among the early promoters of buy now, pay later, for consumer goods in Tamil Nadu. His business ventures formed the foundation of the VGP Group, which continued after his death.

== After Death ==
After Panneerdas's death in 1988, the businesses he established continued under the management of his family and associates. The VGP Group expanded its activities in housing, property development, entertainment and hospitality, carrying forward the business foundations established during his lifetime.
