= Golden Beach, Chennai =

Beach on the Bay of Bengal in Chennai, India

Coordinates: 12.91307°N 80.25276°E

Golden Beach is a natural urban beach located along the Bay of Bengal in Chennai, Tamil Nadu, India. VGP Golden Beach is a major tourist attraction in Chennai. It is situated on the East Coast Road, the seaside road from Chennai to Cuddalore via Pondicherry.

== Resort ==
The VGP Golden Beach Resort opened in 1975, one of the earliest theme parks in South India; it was named for the founder V. G. Panneerdas. The resort on Golden Beach has served as the film sets for a number of Tamil movies.
