= Thiruvallarai =

- Village
- Location in Tamil Nadu, India Thiruvallarai (India)
- Coordinates: 10.950925°N 78.666701°E
- Country: India
- State: Tamil Nadu

Languages
  - Official: Tamil
- Time zone: UTC+5:30 (IST)

Thiruvallarai, also spelled as Thiruvellarai, is a Village in the Indian state of Tamil Nadu.

The Pundarikakshan Perumal Temple, a Vishnu temple, is here.

== Transport ==
It is situated between Trichy and Thuraiyur, next to Mannachanallur. From Chatram Bus stand there are many city buses and Thuraiyur route buses. Trichirappalli is well connected by train to almost all the major cities of India. By air, there are regular flights to Trichy from Chennai, Madurai, Singapore, Malaysia, Sharjha and Colombo. There are buses to almost all parts of Tamil Nadu and Bangalore round the clock.

== See also ==
- Divya Desams (Thrivallarai and Thiruvellarai are one and the same Divya Desam or Holy place, in the list of 108 Holy places)
