= Pundarikakshan Perumal Temple =

Perumal temple in Tiruchirappalli district, Tamil Nadu, India

- Thiruvellarai
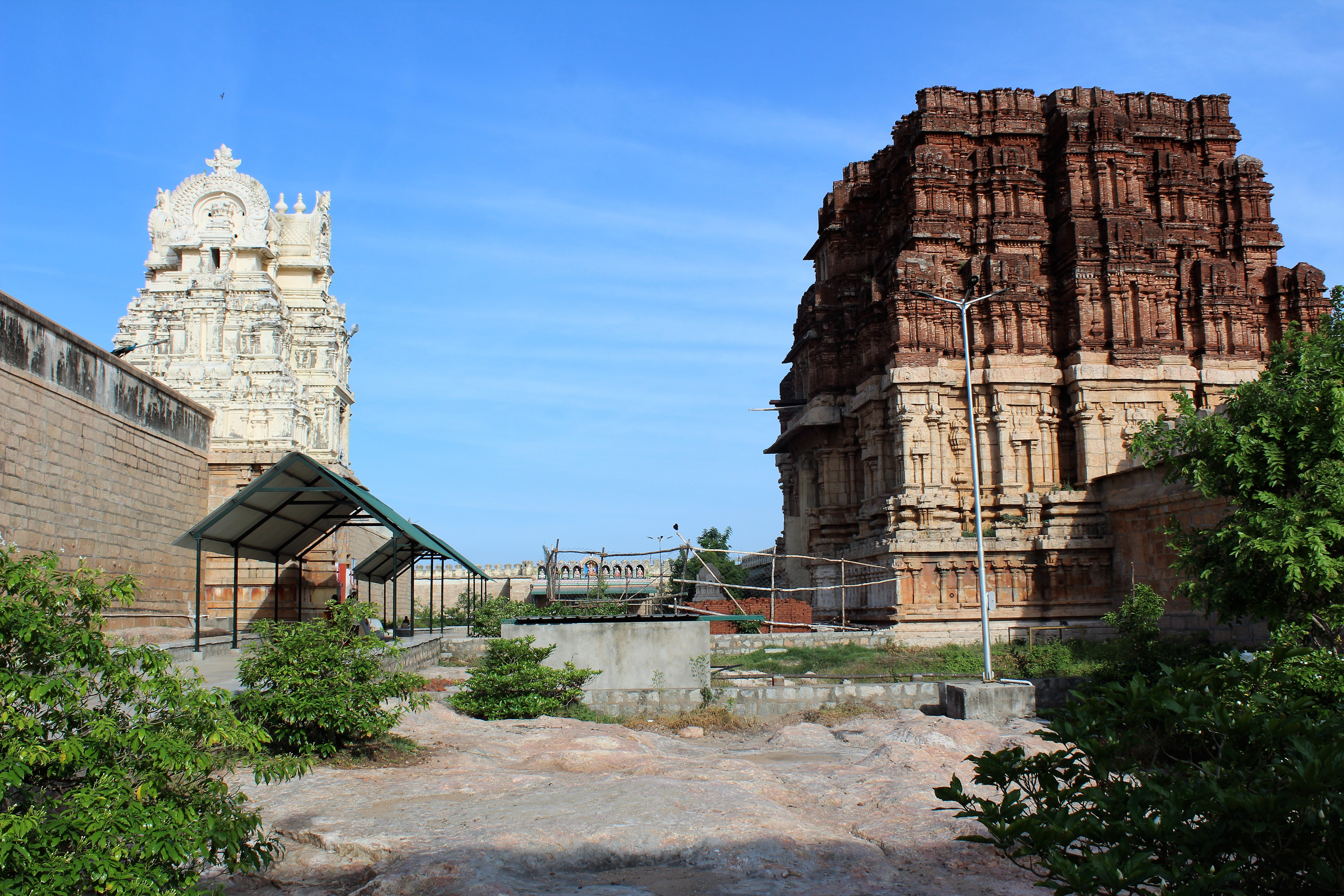
- View of the unfinished southern gateway

- Pundarikakshan Perumal Temple, Thiruvellarai, Tiruchirapalli, Tamil Nadu

Religion
- Affiliation: Hinduism
- District: Tiruchirapalli
- Deity: Pundarikakshan Perumal (Vishnu); Pankajavalli Thayar (Lakshmi)
- Features: Tower: Vimalaakkruthi Vimanam

Location
- Location: Thiruvellarai
- State: Tamil Nadu
- Country: India
- Coordinates: 10°57′21.6″N 78°40′03.7″E

Architecture
- Type: Tamil architecture
- Creator: Cholas

Specifications
- Temple: One
- Elevation: 136.79 m (449 ft)

The Pundarikakshan Perumal Temple or Thiruvellarai Temple in Thiruvellarai, a village in the outskirts of Tiruchirappalli in the South Indian state of Tamil Nadu, is dedicated to the Hindu god Vishnu. Constructed in the Dravidian style of architecture, the temple is glorified in the Naalayira Divya Prabandham, the early medieval Tamil canon of the Alvar saints from the 6th–9th centuries CE. It is one of the 108 Divya Desams dedicated to Vishnu, who is worshipped as Pundarikakshan and his consort Lakshmi as Pankajavalli.

According to legends, the temple is said to have been built by Sibi Chakravarthy. The temple has three inscriptions in its two rock-cut caves, two dating from the period of Nandivarman II (732–796 CE) and the other to that of Dantivarman (796–847). It also has Pallava sculptural depictions of Narasimha and Varaha, two of the ten avatars of Vishnu.

A granite wall surrounds the temple, enclosing all its shrines and six of its seven bodies of water. The rajagopuram, the temple's gateway tower, is unfinished. A swastika shaped temple tank built in 800 CE by Kamban Araiyan during the reign of Dantivarman is outside the temple complex. The Vijayanagar and Nayak kings commissioned paintings on the walls of the shrine of Pudarikakshan, some of which are still present.

Pundarikakshan is believed to have appeared and showered his divine grace to Garuda (vahana of Vishnu), Sibi Chakravarthy, sage Markandeya and Hindu gods Bhoomadevi, Brahma, Shiva, Indra and Chandra. Six daily rituals and three yearly festivals are held at the temple, of which the chariot festival, celebrated during the Tamil month of Chaitra (March–April), is the most prominent. The festival is unique in the state as a community feast is offered, a custom stretching back many centuries. The temple is maintained and administered by the Hindu Religious and Endowment Board of the Government of Tamil Nadu.

== History ==
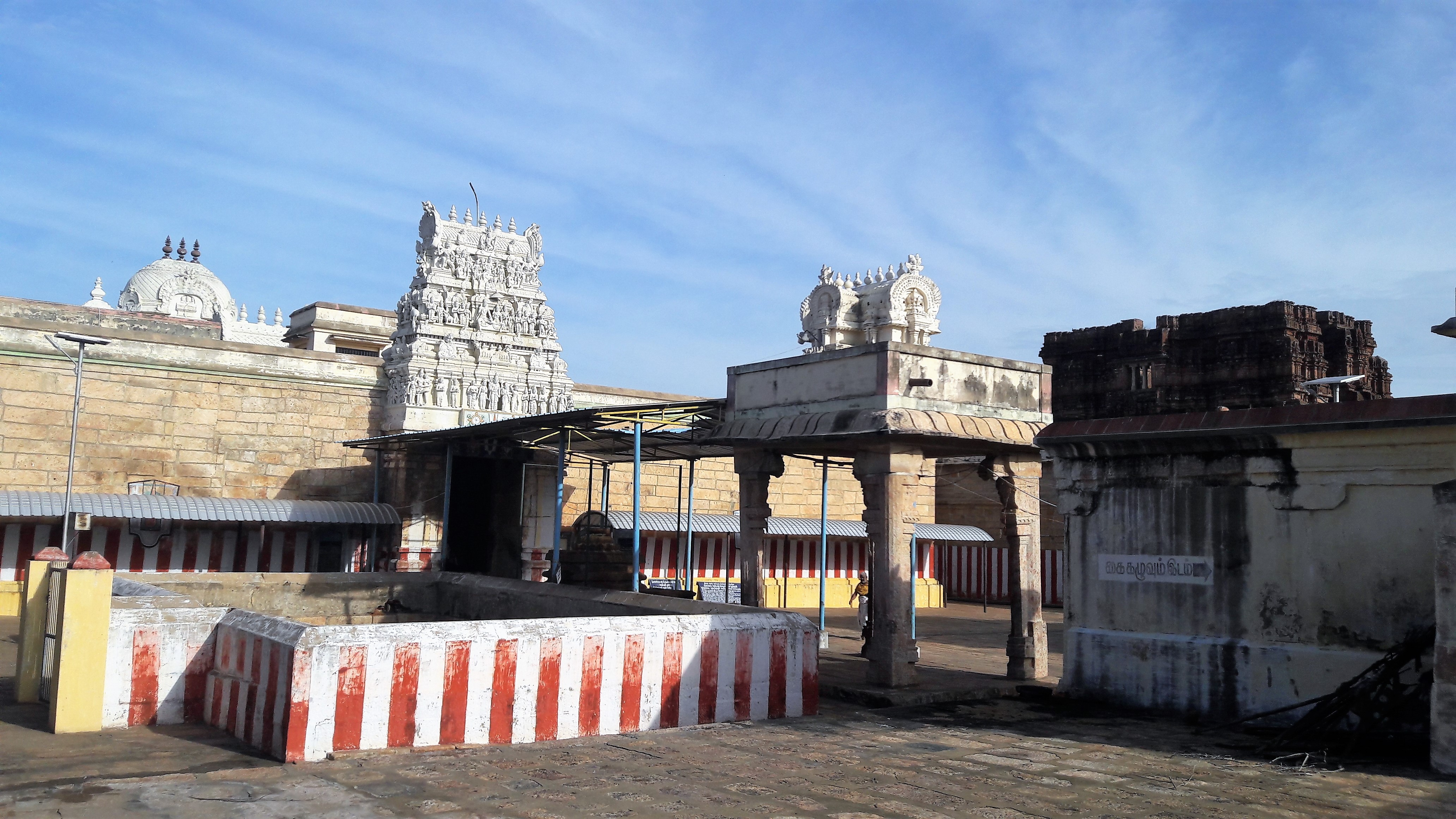
The temple tank in front of the main gateway

Pundarikakshan Perumal temple is believed to have been built by the Pallavas, as seen from the three inscriptions in its two rock-cut caves. Two of the inscriptions are dated from the period of Nandivarman II (732–796 CE) and the other from the period of Dantivarman (796–847 CE). The temple construction completed presumably during the time of Dantivarman. The influence of Alvars, the Vaishanva saints of the 7th–9th centuries helped spread Vaishnavism to a greater extent among the public and the ruling Pallava kings, who became temple patrons.

A Chola inscription indicates an endowment to the shrines of Krishna (an avatar of Vishnu) and his chief consort, Rukmini, inside the temple by King Parakesarivarman (907–955 CE). The temple had later additions from the subsequent Chola, later Pandyas, Hoysala and the Vijayanagara kings. The temple suffered extensive damage during a flood and was repaired by a merchant around 1262–63.

In modern times, the temple is maintained and administered by the Hindu Religious and Endowment Board of the Government of Tamil Nadu. An Executive officer appointed by the Board manages the temple along with Srirangam Ranganathaswamy temple, Sri Alagiya Manavala Perumal Temple at Woraiyur, Sri Vadivalagiya Nambi Perumal Temple and Mariamman Temple at Anbil. Annadhanam scheme, which provides free food to devotees, is implemented in the temple by the Board. Under the scheme, free food is offered to hundred devotees every day in the temple and the expenditure is fully funded by the contributions from devotees.

== Architecture ==
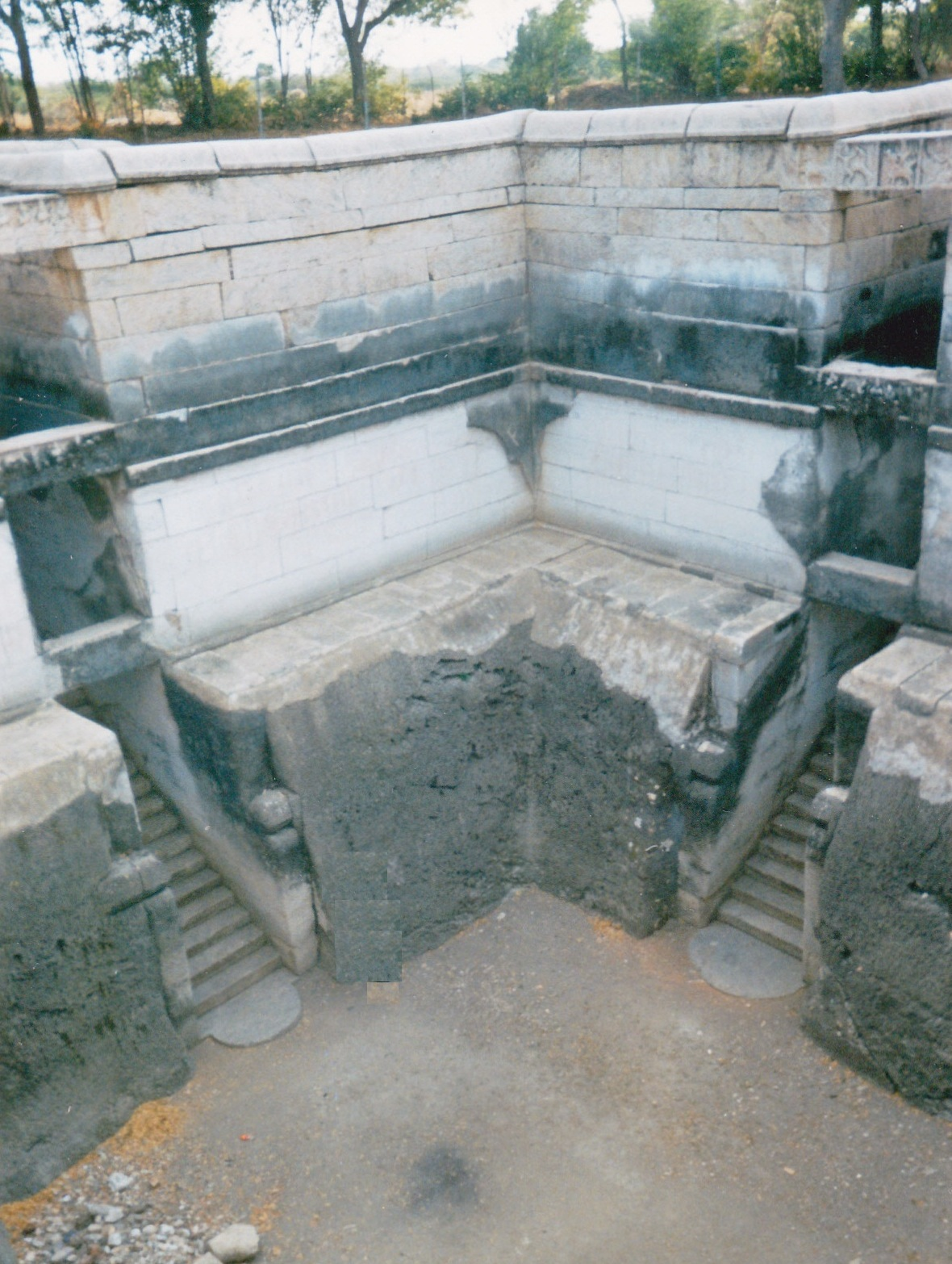
Swastika tank, with stepped entrances in all four sides, was built in 800 CE

Pundarikakshan Perumal temple is located in Thiruvellarai, a village 27 km (17 mi) from Tiruchirappalli, on the Thuraiyur road. The shrine of Pundarikakshan is built on a 15 m (50 ft) tall artificial hill. There are two stepped entrances to the sanctum, Utharayana Vaasal and Dhakshanayana Vaasal, each open for a six-month period. From 15 January to 15 June, Utharayanya Vaasal is opened, Dhakshanaya Vaasal is for the other six-month period. Pundarikakshan, the presiding deity of the temple is named "Maayavan" during Dakshinayanam and "Thai Maatha Naayagan" during Uttarayanam. The two gates in the temple are believed to represent the continuous cycle of entering into life and getting out of it. An image of the presiding deity, Pundarikakshan, is seen in a standing posture facing east. He is believed to have appeared to Garuda, Sibi Chakravarthy, Bhoomadevi, sage Markandeya, Brahma and Shiva, all of whose images are housed inside the sanctum. The consort of Pundarikakshan, Shenbagavalli, (also called "Peri Pirattiyaar Lakshmi Devi") has a separate shrine. The Utsavar (festival image) of Pankajavalli is called Shenbagavalli and is housed inside the same shrine. The temple has Pallava sculptural depictions of Narasimha and Varaha, two of the ten avatars of Vishnu. Narasimha is depicted holding a demon in one panel, the other shows him tearing the demon.

The rectangular walls around the temple enclose all the eight shrines and six of the seven water bodies associated with the temple. Besides the main shrine for Pundarikakshan and Pangayavalli, the temple has shrines for Alvars, Garuda, Ramanujar and Uyyakondar. The seven water bodies are Divya Tirtham, Kanda Kshree Tirtham, Tirtham, Chakkara Tirtham, Pushkala Tirtham, Padma Tirtham and Varaaha Manikarnika Tirtham. The vimanam (structure over the sanctum) is called Vimalaakkruthi Vimaanam. There are various sculptural depictions of Krishna on the pillars of the temple, in the most notable of which he is depicted dancing on a pot. He is seen dancing in Swastika posture with his buns like hair-do, ornaments and anklet. In another sculpture, he is seen slaying the demon Bhagasura. The Vijayanagar and Nayak kings commissioned the Krishna paintings on the exterior walls of the shrine of Pundarikakshan; they have clear labels. Paintings with some of the popular themes from the epic Ramayana were also commissioned by the Nayak kings in the temple.

The rajagopuram, the main gateway tower, is an unfinished structure. An initiative to complete the estimated 22 m (72 ft) has been mooted by the Hindu Religious and Endowment Board in 2017. A swastika-shaped temple tank built during 800 CE is present in the south-western corner of the street around the temple. It has four stepped gateways, each having 51 steps. The tank is believed to have been built by Kamban Araiyan during the reign of Dantivarman. In modern times, it is maintained by the Department of Archaeology of the Government of Tamil Nadu. The temple complex covers an area of 2.62 ha (6.5 acres), while the tank covers an area of 0.1256 ha (0.310 acres) and many mandapas are dedicated to the Lord which cover a total 3.2 ha (8 acres).

An archaeological study in 2010 revealed that the layout of the rock-cut caves in the temple is similar to that of other rock-cut temples such as the Rockfort and Pechipalai cave temple. The unfinished caves in the temple, along with the lower cave temples in Tiruchirappalli and Tiruparankunram, each have a shrine for Shiva in the east and Vishnu in the west, separated by a central bay between them.

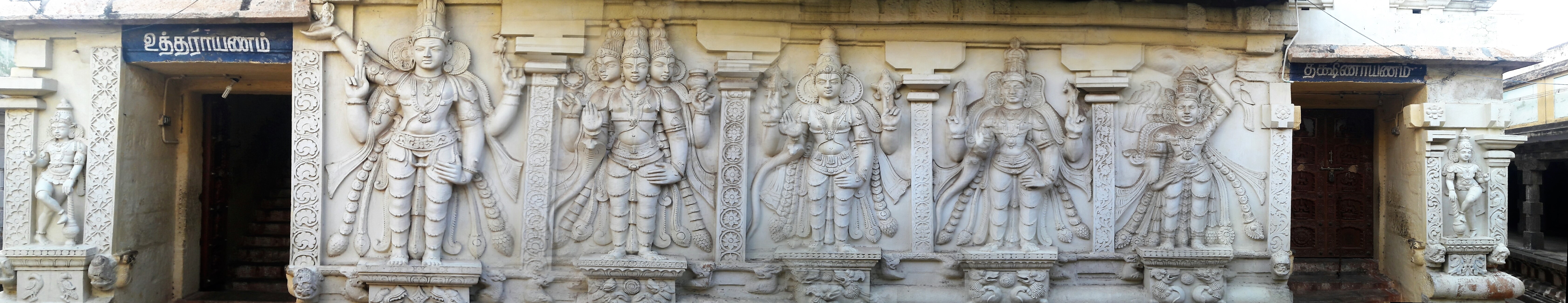
Panorama of the Uttarayana and Daskhinaya entrances of the temple sanctum

== Legend ==
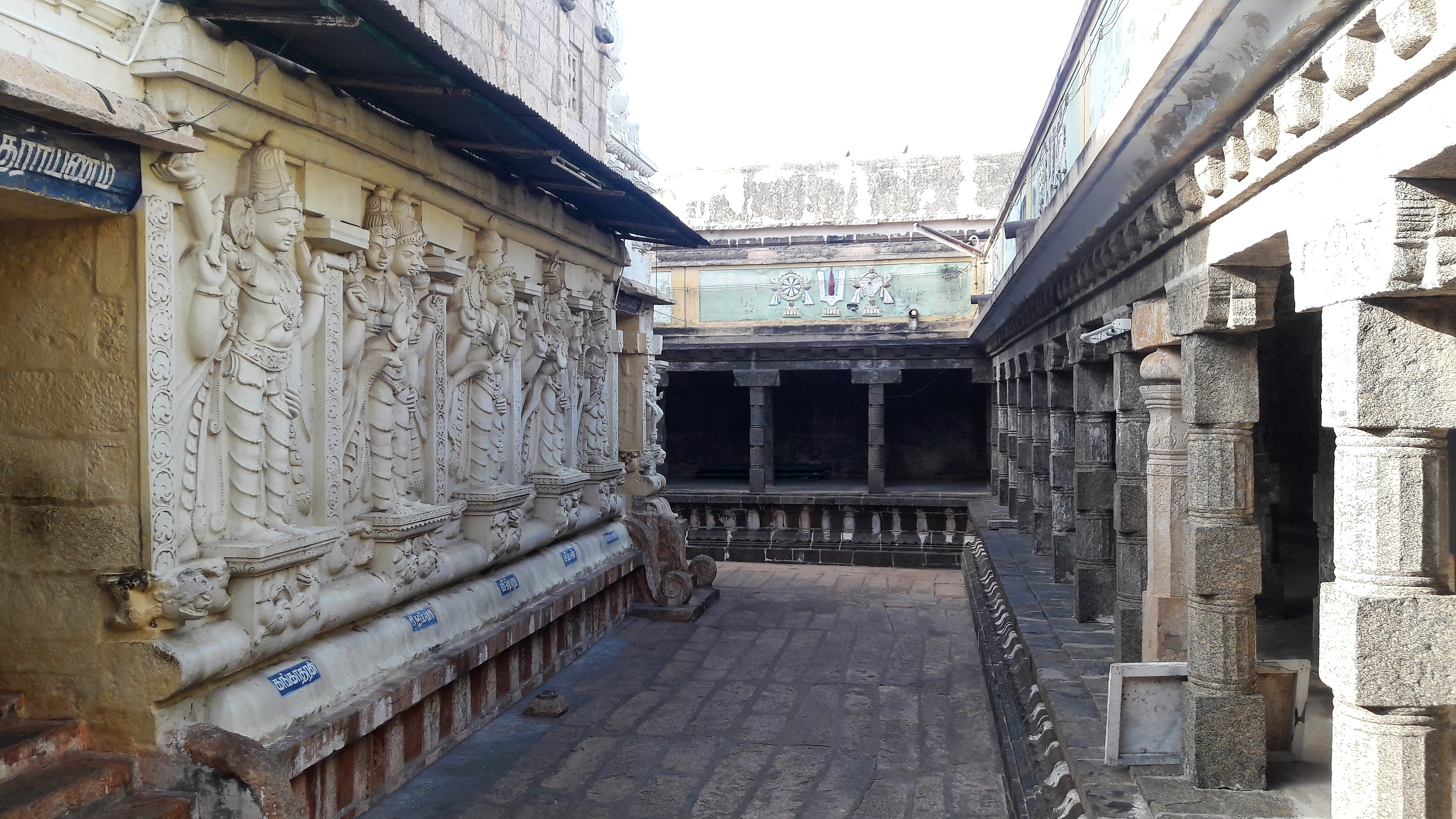
The passageway around the sanctum

The word Vellarai means white rock. Owing to the presence of white rocks in the region, the place is historically referred to as Thiru Vellara. As per Hindu legend, when Sibi Chakravarthi stayed there with his warriors, a white boar crossed his path. He chased it and the boar hid inside a hole. Markandeya, a sage, was doing penance there and the king narrated the incident to him. The sage asked the king to fill the hole with milk. While doing so, Hindu god Vishnu appeared before them. The sage asked the king to bring 3700 Vaishnavas from the north and build a temple on the site for Vishnu. As requested, the king took 3700 Vaishnavas and started building the temple. While doing so, one of the Vaishnavas was killed in transit and the king was concerned by the accident. Vishnu appeared incognito as Pundarikakshan, a Vaishnava, and requested to be counted among the 3700. According to another legend Lakshmi, the consort of Vishnu, performed penance at the temple, and Vishnu appeared before her as Sengamalakannan. The presiding deity has since been called "Thamarai Kannan", meaning the one who has eyes resembling lotus; his consort is called "Pankajha-Valli". The Hindu god Shiva in form of Neelivaneswarar is believed to have worshipped Pundarikakshan to absolve himself from the sin of holding Brahma's severed head. Vishnu appeared to both Shiva and Brahma, adhering to their prayers.

== Religious significance ==
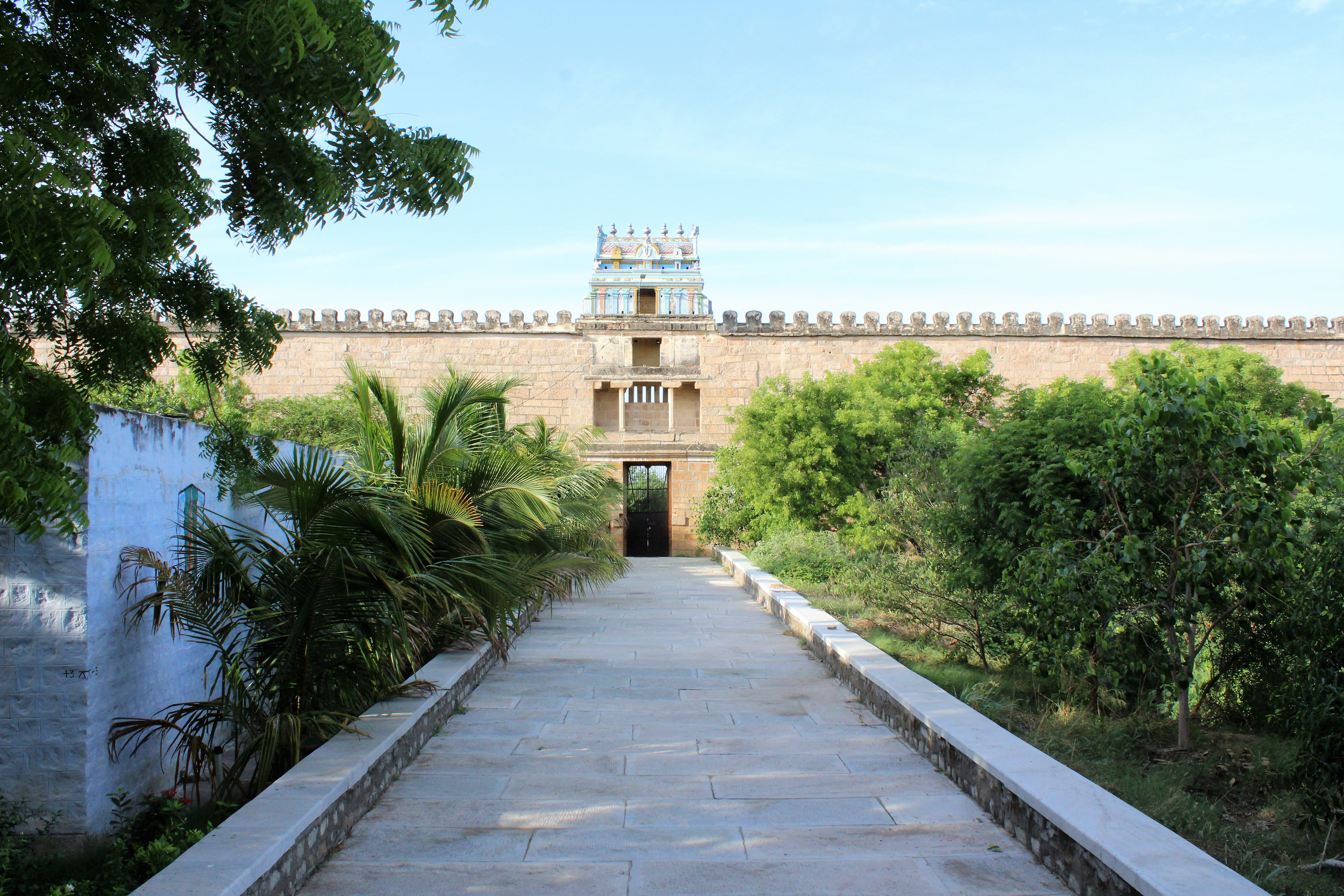
Fort walls of the temple compound

The temple is revered in Nalayira Divya Prabandham, the 7th–9th century Vaishnava canon, by Periyalvar in eleven hymns and by Thirumangai Alvar in thirteen hymns. The temple is classified as a Divya Desam, one of the 108 Vishnu temples mentioned in the Naalayira Divya Prabandham. Some of the ancient Sanskrit books consider the temple an uthamakshetram, meaning a place that gives the best to its devotees. The sculptures on the pillars of the temple reveal the earliest practice of Krishna worship in Tamil Nadu. Vedanta Desika (1269–1370) revered the temple in his work Hamsa Sandesam. It is also considered one of the most hallowed and pious Vaishnava Divyadesams, as being older than the Sri Ranganathaswamy Temple, Srirangam, one visit to this temple is considered equal to visiting all 108 Vaishnava Divyadesams. As per Hindu legend, the eighteen steps in the temple represent the eighteen chapters of the Bhagavad Gita and the last four steps represent the four vedas, the sacred Hindu religious texts. Sounds produced near some of the big pillars of the temple echoes around the temple. Some of the sacred verses are recited more than once in front of these pillars during worship. Thiruvellarai is the birthplace of Uyyakondar, a disciple of Nathamunigal. Thiruvellarai is also the birthplace of Engalazhwan (Vishnuchitthar), who is believed to have taught Sri Bhasyam to Nadadhoor Ammal at the temple.

According to Hindu tradition, Ramanuja (1017–1137), the leading expounder of Vishishtadvaita philosophy, visited the temple. One of his disciples placed Ramanuja's sandals along with the image of Varadarajan. Ramanuja became furious at this, for which the disciple explained that for Ramanuja Varadarajar is god, but for him, Ramanuja is supreme. Thiruvellarai is the birthplace of Uyyakondar, a disciple of Nathamuni. Swami Engalazhwan is believed to have taught Sri Bhasyam to Nadadhoor Ammal at the temple. The Jiyar of the temple, who serves as its head, is known as Pankaya Selvi Jiyar, named after the temple's Thayar.

== Festivals ==
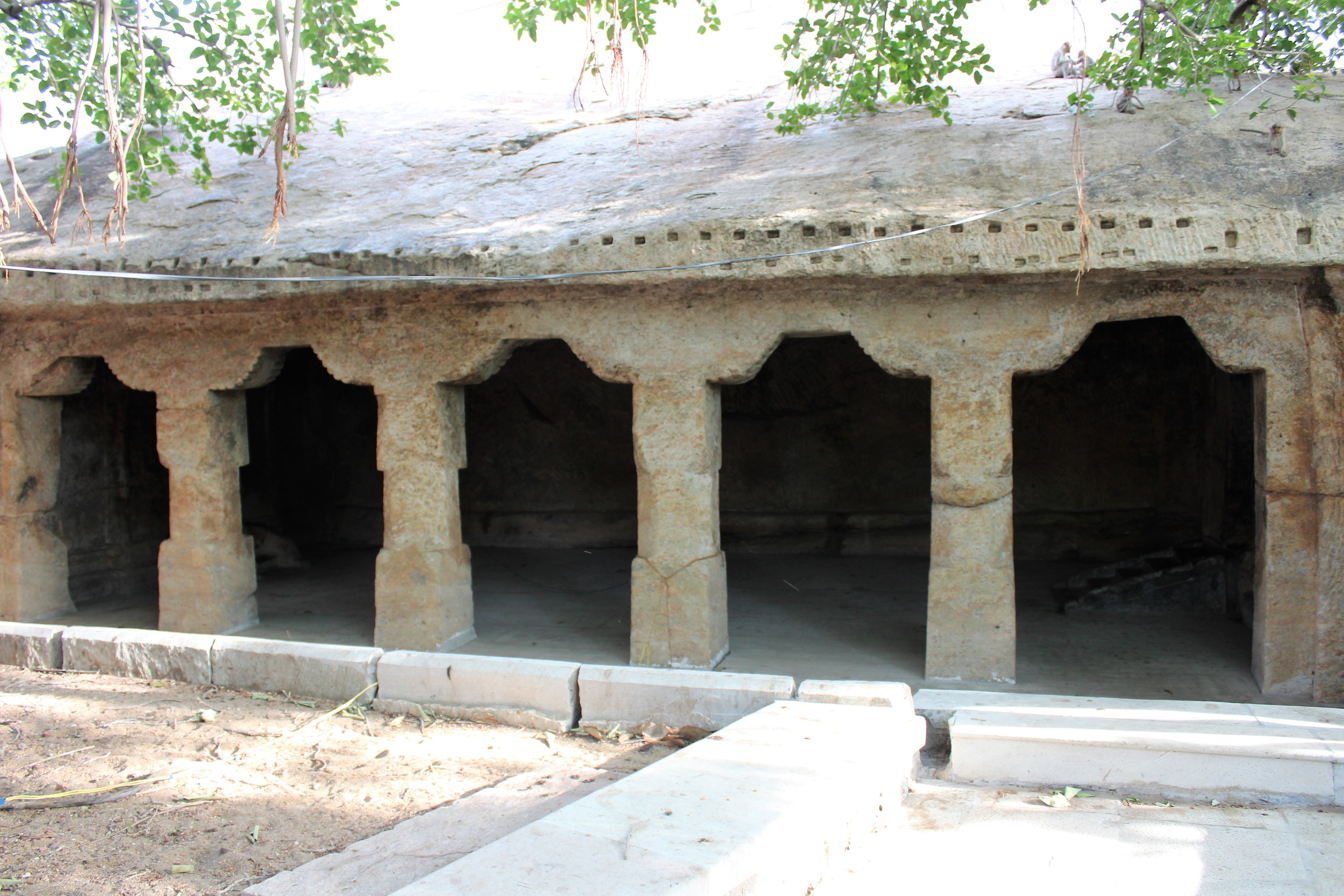
Cave temple in the temple compound

The Chariot festival is the most prominent festival of the temple, and for the surrounding villages. It is celebrated during the Tamil month of Chittirai (March–April) when devotees pull the chariot around the streets of Tirvellarai. Verses from Naalayira Divya Prabandham are recited by a group of temple priests amidst music with nagaswaram (pipe instrument) and tavil (percussion instrument). The chariot festival is unique in the state as a community feast is offered by several individuals and committees, a custom many centuries old. The processional idols of Pundarikakshan and Pankajavalli are brought to the temple car early in the morning amidst religious chanting. Ratharohanam, the rituals associated with taking the idols to the temple car, is performed at an auspicious time before commencing the procession.
