= Dalavanur =

Rock temple in India

Dalavanur Satrumalla Pallava Cave rockcut Temple
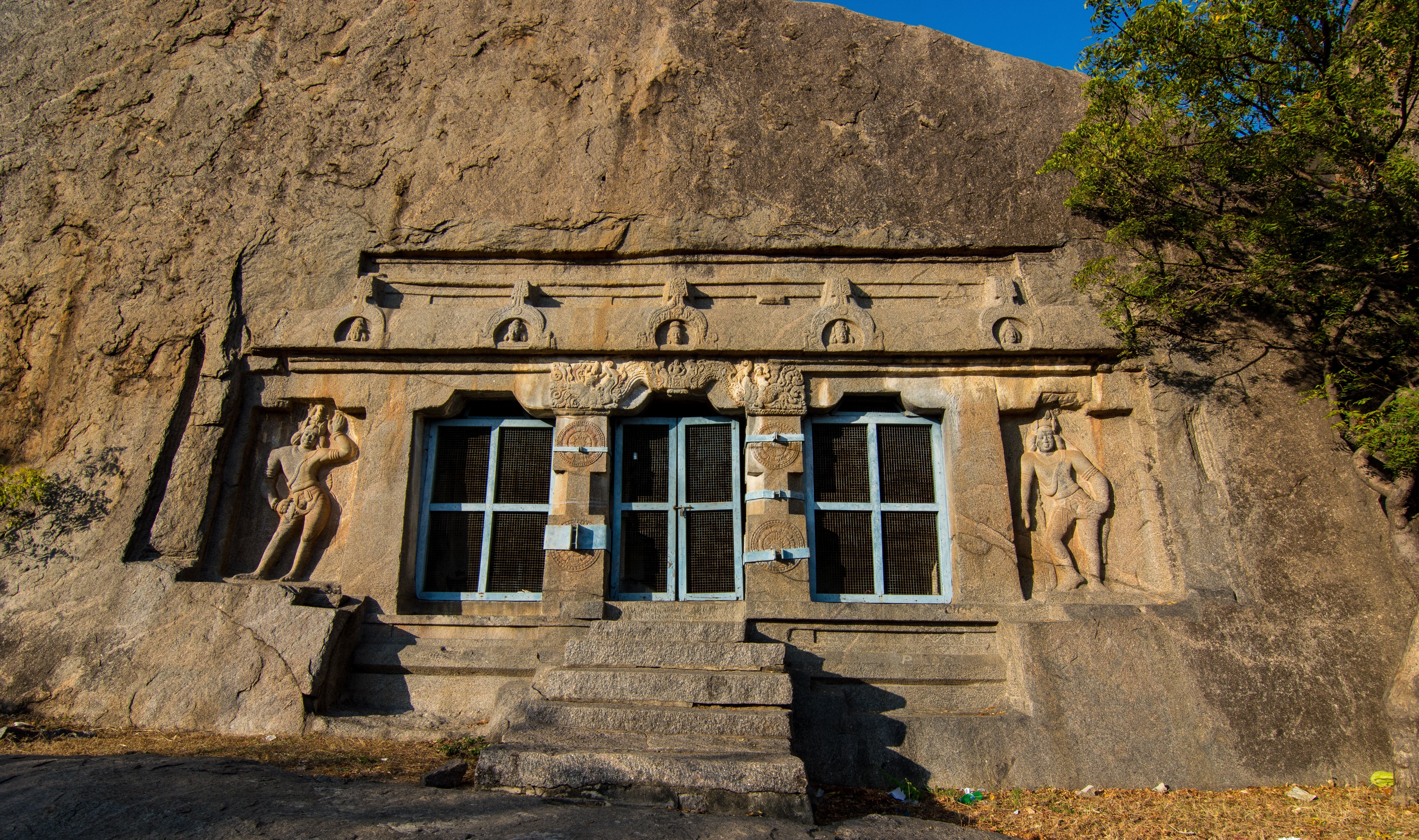
- Satrumalla Pallava Cave rockcut Temple, Dalavanur, Viluppuram district, Tamil Nadu

- Satrumalla Pallava Cave Temple, Dalavanur, Viluppuram district, Tamil Nadu

Religion
- Affiliation: Hinduism
- District: Viluppuram
- Deity: Shiva
- Festival: Maha Shivaratri

Location
- Location: Dalavanur
- State: Tamil Nadu
- Country: India
- Interactive map of Dalavanur Satrumalla Pallava Cave rockcut Temple
- Coordinates: 12.166573°N 79.468741°E

Architecture
- Type: Dravidian architecture
- Completed

Specifications
- Temple: One
- Monument: One
- Inscriptions: Found
- Elevation: 97.73 m (321 ft)

Dalavanur Sathrumalleswaram Pallava rockcut temple is situated between Gingee and Mandagapattu in Tamil Nadu. Attributed to the 7th-century Pallava king Mahendravarman I, the temple, cut out of the rock, is thought to have been dedicated to Shiva, and is noted for its unusual inscriptions. It is an Archaeological Survey of India site.

Above the cave temple there are Jain rock bed resembles.
