= Thiruvarul Kaleesvarar Subramanaswamy Temple, Malayakkoyil =

Hindu temple in Tamil Nadu, India

Thiruvarul Kaleesvarar Subramanaswamy Temple is a Hindu temple dedicated to the deity Shiva and Muruga, located at Malayakkoyil of Pudukkottai district in Tamil Nadu, India.

== Location ==
This temple is located at a distance of 2 km from Nachandupatti in Pudukkottai-Ponnamaravathi road. Buses are plying from Pudukottai.

== Structure ==
This temple was called as ‘Orukkombu Malai’, ‘Kurinji Kottha Naval Kurichi’, ‘Thirunavalangiri’, and ‘Thiruvothikkal’. This is a hill temple. For climbing up and coming down there are two separate routes known as Sarappathai and Padivettuppathai. The temple which is found on the bottom of the hill is known as ‘Keelkkoyil’ and the temple found on the top of the hill is known as ‘Melkoyil’. At the bottom of the bill a cave temple is found in the east and another cave temple is found in the south. There are two cave temples here. This cave temple belonged to the 2nd century CE.

== Shiva in the bottom ==
In the foothills of the hill the presiding deity Shiva is found in the garbhagriha. Goddess and Valampuri Vinayaka are found. The presiding deity is known as Thiruvarul Kaleesvarar and the goddess is known as Dharmasamvarthini. The presiding deity is also known as Thiruvengai Kanalessvarar and Malayalingam and the goddess as Thambiratti and Aram Valarttha Nayaki.

== Muruga on the top ==
On the top of the hill the presiding deity Subramaniaswamy, Muruga, is found. Very near to him Jadamuneesvarar is found. After climbing up the hill, in the artha mandapa. Vinayaka and processional deity Subramania are found. In the garbhagriha, Subramania with his consorts Valli and Deivanai is found. In the south, the shrine of Idumban is found. The temple tank known as 'Saravana Poigai' is found near the shrine of the presiding deity.

== Worshipping time ==
Pujas are held four times daily at Kalasanthi (9.00 a.m.), Uttchikkalam (noon 12.00), Sayaratchai (6.00 p.m.) and Arthajamam (8.00 p.m.). The temple is open for worship from 6.00 to 12.00 noon and 4.30 to 8.30 p.m. During Pournami devotees go around the temple. Thaipusam festival is held here in a grand manner.
