= Valliyur =

Valliyur Vadakku Vallioor
- Town panchayat
- Valliyur, Tamil Nadu
- Coordinates: 8.401400°N 77.617400°E
- Country: India
- State: Tamil Nadu
- District: Tirunelveli
- Taluk: Radhapuram
- Elevation: 121 m (397 ft)

Population (2011)
  - Total: 29,417
  - Estimate (2024): 41,000

Languages
  - Official: Tamil
- Time zone: UTC+5:30 (IST)
- Postal code: 627117
- Telephone code: 04637
- Vehicle registration: TN-72

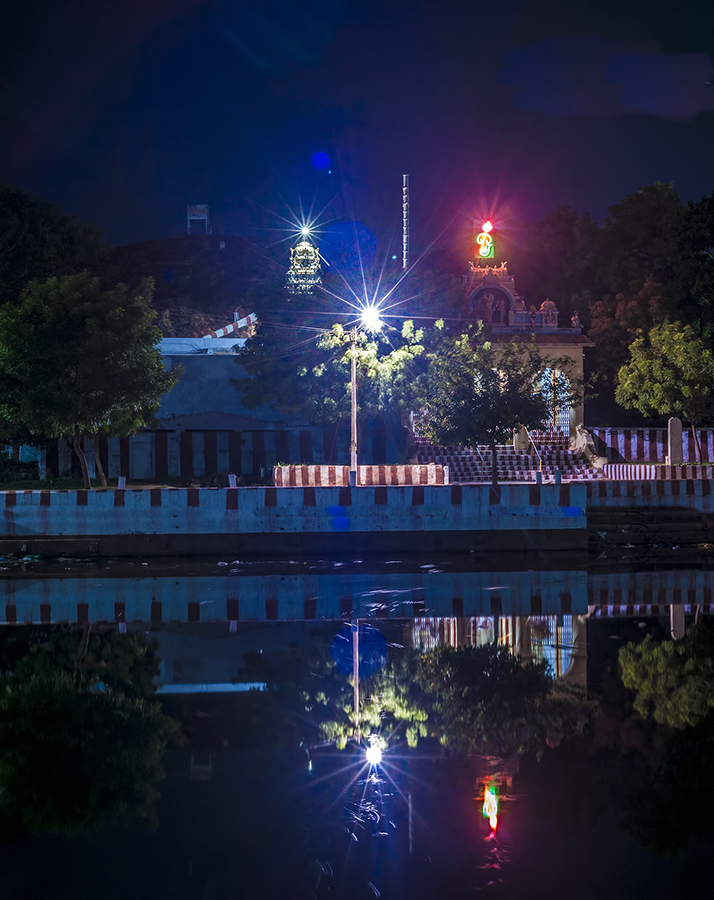
Sri Subramaniya swami Temple, Vallioor during festival

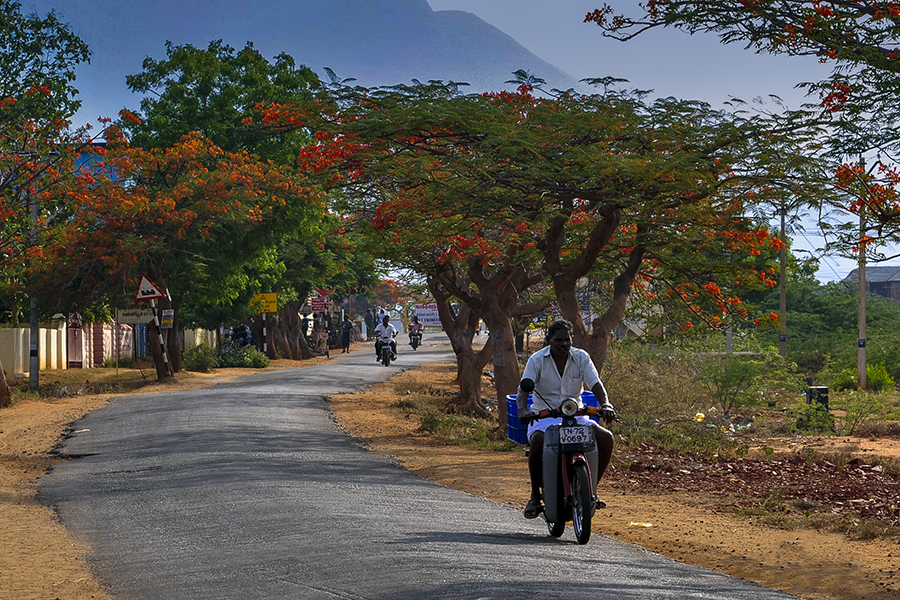
Vallioor

Vadakku valliyur or Valliyur is a Special Grade Town Panchayat in Radhapuram taluk in Tirunelveli district in the Indian state of Tamil Nadu.Valliyur is one of the fastest-growing towns in Tirunelveli district. This town is located along NH 7. It gets its name from the goddess Valli, consort of Murugan, the Hindu god of war. The place connects the big city of Tirunelveli to the city of Nagercoil and the town of Kanyakumari on NH 7.

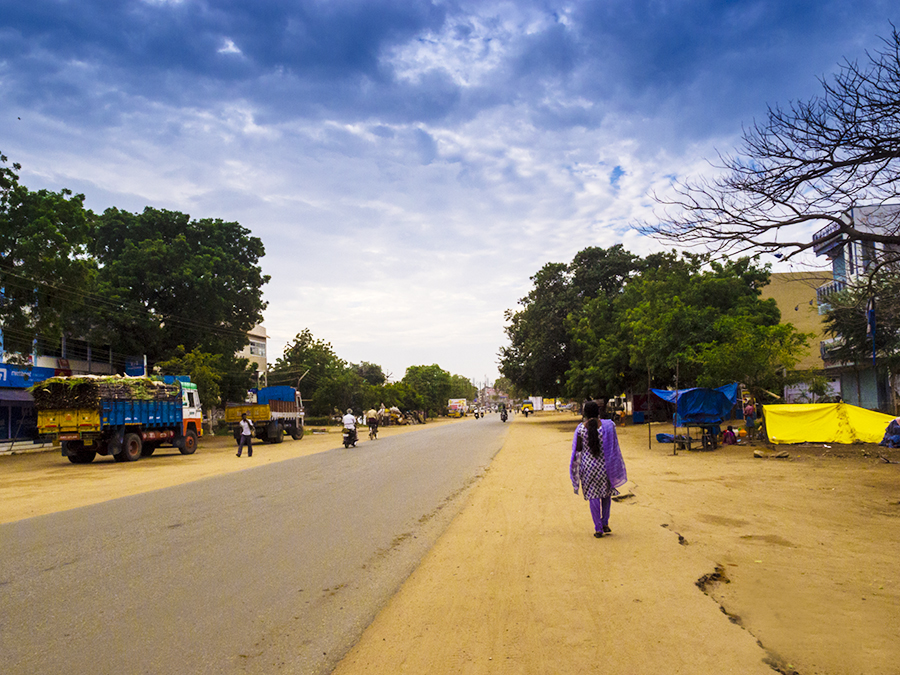
Valliyur Main Road

== Thiru Subramaniyar Swami Kovil ==
This ancient Murugan temple is located at Vallioor, not far from Tirunelveli and Kanyakumari. It has been revered by the Tiruppukazh hymns of Arunagirinathar.

The presiding deity here is Subramaniyar, and the sanctum enshrines an image of Murugan with that of his consort Valli. The temple has a rock-cut sanctum carved out of a hill and several mandapams surrounding it. There are also shrines to Natarajar and Dakshinamūrti here. The Saravanapoikai tank is located adjacent to the hill. The diamond studded Vel held by Subramaniyar is of great beauty.

Legend has it that Indra and Agastyar worshipped Subramanyar here. Legend also has it that the Saravanapoikai tank was created when Murugan struck his spear to the ground, upon being requested by his consort.Even the name of the village "Vallioor" or"Valliyur" is after the name of the Goddess Valli, the consort of Lord Murugan, who is praised and sung hugely in Tamil folk songs and Dances.

Legend has it that this temple was first discovered by a Pandya king who came here on a hunting expedition after visiting the Perumal temple at Tirukkurunkudi and that the temple was expanded by his descendants. Vallioor was under the governance of Kulasekhara Pandyan of the 13th century, who fortified the village. The temple is located between the mountains and the pond in front of the temple is said to be made by the spear(vel) of lord Muruga.The temple is a prime example of the great architect and design knowledge of the Pandya Kings, it is monolithic temple adorned by magnifiecent gopurams.

=== Festivals ===
Giri pradakshinam is considered to be of importance here as in Tiruvannamalai, Kunnakkudi and Palani. Seven worship services are carried out each day. Skanda Sashti is celebrated with great splendour here as are the float festival in the month of Karttikai and the annual festival in the month of Chittirai. Kodai in Sudlaimadan Temple is celebrated on the first Friday of Adi month and draws devotees from all over the World.

== Other places ==
The Valliyur Moondru Yugam Kanda Amman Temple is located here. A recent addition to Valliyur is the United Volunteer Service Society (UVSS) - New Life Home for Aged Destitutes. Located about 7 km (4.3 mi) towards Eruvadi. This is a new initiative by like minded people and does not involve any specific religious group or Government or specific community.

It is the center city of the big cities Tirunelveli and Nagercoil. It takes half an hour from Vallioor to reach Kudankulam.

Meanwhile, 25 km (16 mi) from the town is a place named Aralvaimozhi (en route to Nagercoil). Between this stretch is present South Asia's largest wind power generation centre. Since this place is good at climate conditions and near to the western ghats the wind power generation systems came into existence and the only one in India.

== Demographics ==
As per Census 2011, the population of Vadakku Valliyur Town Panchayat is 29,417. Female population of 14,883 outnumbers male population of 14,534. This population figures does not include the newly developed residential areas which do not come under the Town Panchayat limit. The Town Panchayat has a literacy rate of 91.09%, with the male literacy around 94.8% and the female literacy rate around 87.50%. 77.03% of the population is Hindu, 21.15% is Christian, and 1.64% is Muslim. Vadakkuvalliyur Town Panchayat has total administration over 7,760 houses to which it supplies basic amenities like water and sewage.

== Transport facilities ==
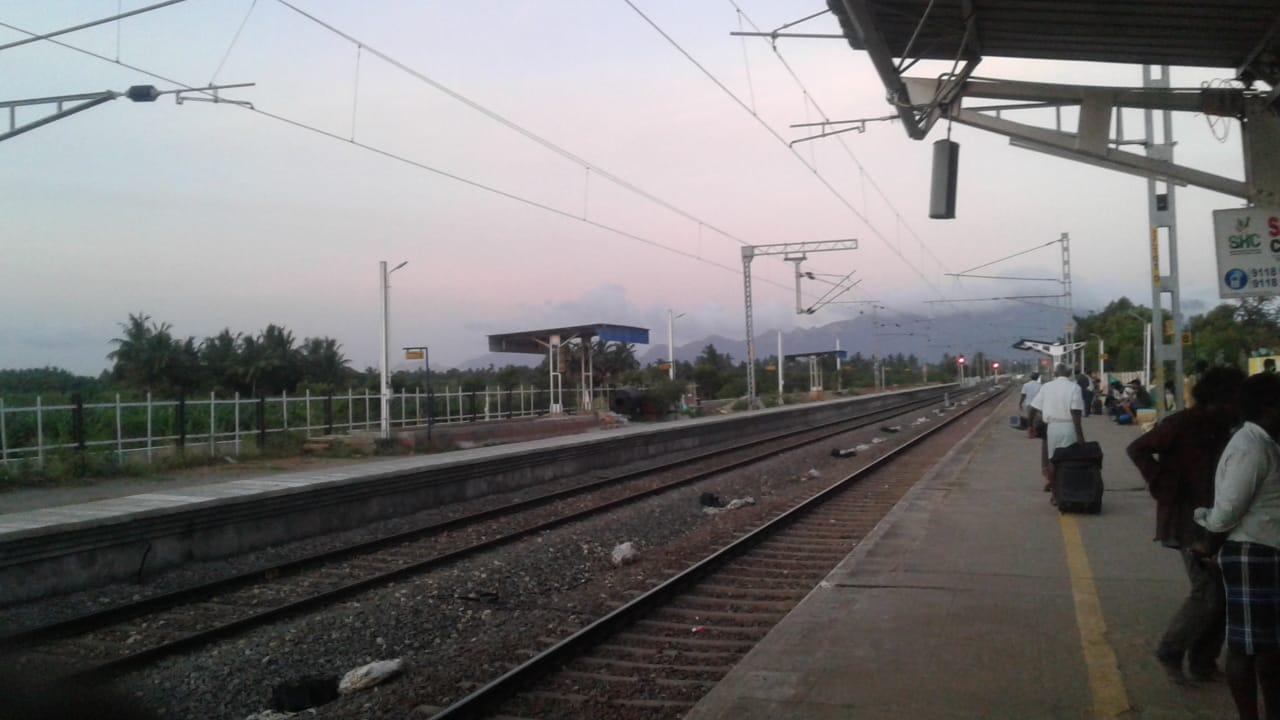
Valliyur Railway station

Valliyur is well connected by road and rail network. It is located on NH 44, the longest running north- south highway of India, the four-lane express way provides good connectivity to Valliyur. Scheduled bus services are available to Tirunelveli, Nagercoil, Chennai, Madurai, Coimbatore, Thiruvananthapuram, Bengaluru and many other places. The Valliyur Railway station is located on the eastern part of the town provides train connections with Chennai, Bengaluru, Mumbai, Delhi, Howrah, etc.

The nearest airport is Thoothukkudi Airport, at 75 km (45 mi). Thiruvananthapuram International Airport is 120 km (75 mi) away, and Madurai International Airport at 200 kilometres (120 mi) also serve the people of Valliyur.

== Notable people ==
- Ali Manikfan, Indian marine researcher
- Alex Paul Menon, Indian civil servant
- V. G. Panneerdas, Indian entrepreneur

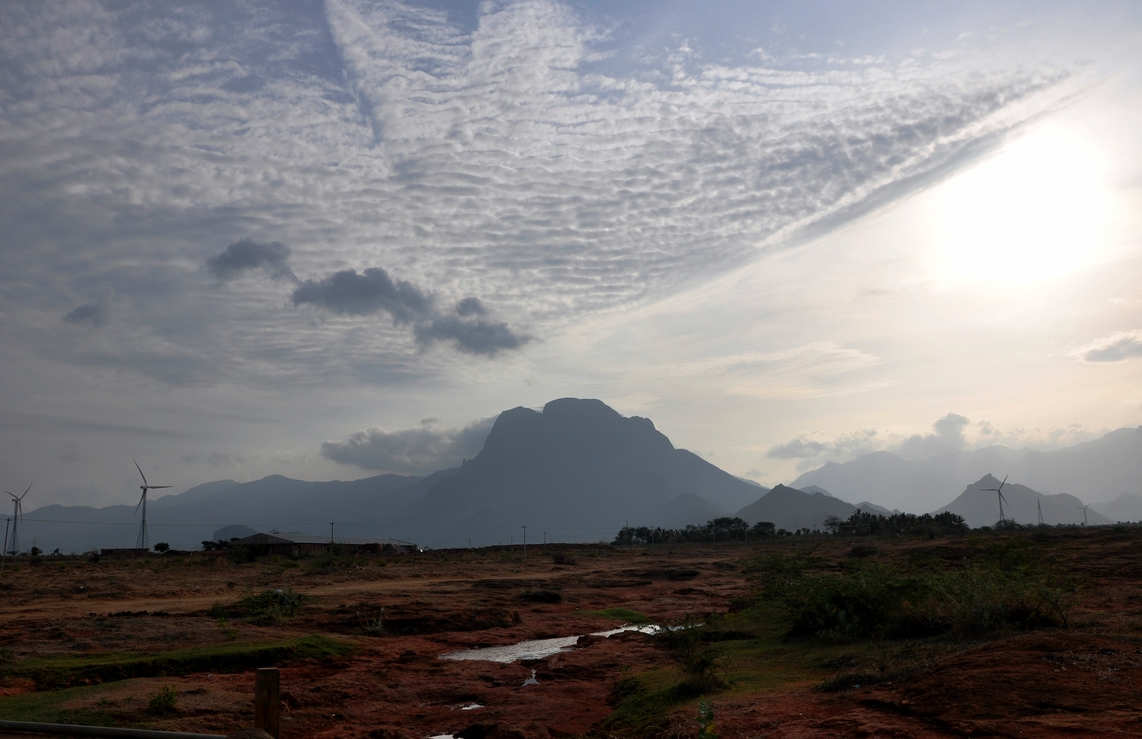
Valliyur

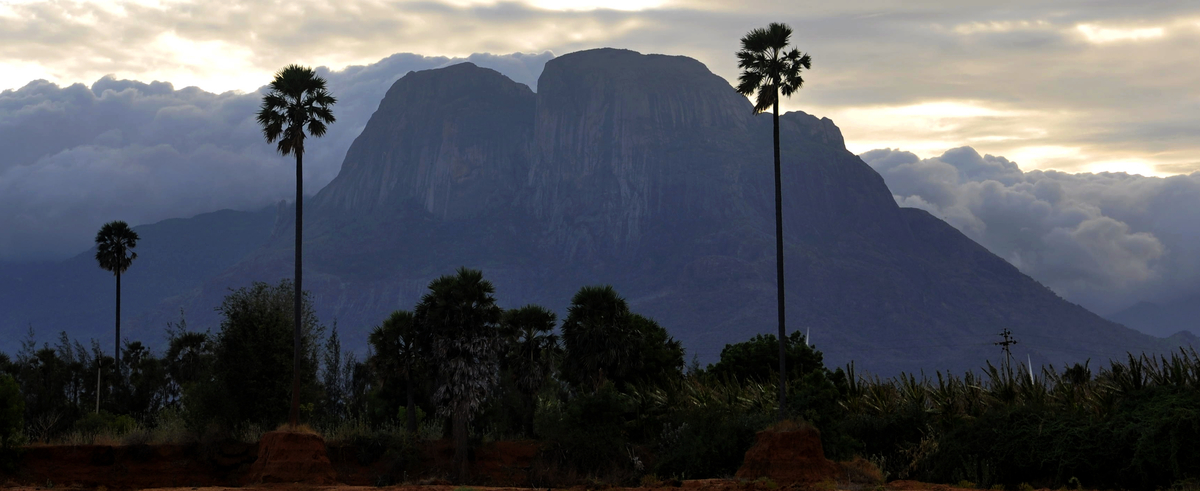
Valliyur

== List of village panchayats ==
- Avaraikulam
- Alanginar Thirumalapuram
- Achampadu
- Adangarkulam
- Anaikulam
- Avaraikulam
- Chettikulam
- Chidambarapuram-Yacobpuram
- Erukkanthurai
- Elayanainar kulam
- Kannanallur
- Kizhavaneri
- Kavalkinaru
- Kovankulam
- Levinchipuram
- Maddappuram
- Moolaikadu
- Nambiyanvillai
- Pazhavoor
- Puthur
- Thanakkarkulam
- Therkku Karunkulam-sanganapuram
- Therkku Valliyoor_
- Vadakkankulam
- Veppilankulam

Zion Malai

Ambalavanapuram
