= Narasingam Yoga Narasimha Perumal Temple =

Yoga Narasimhar Temple
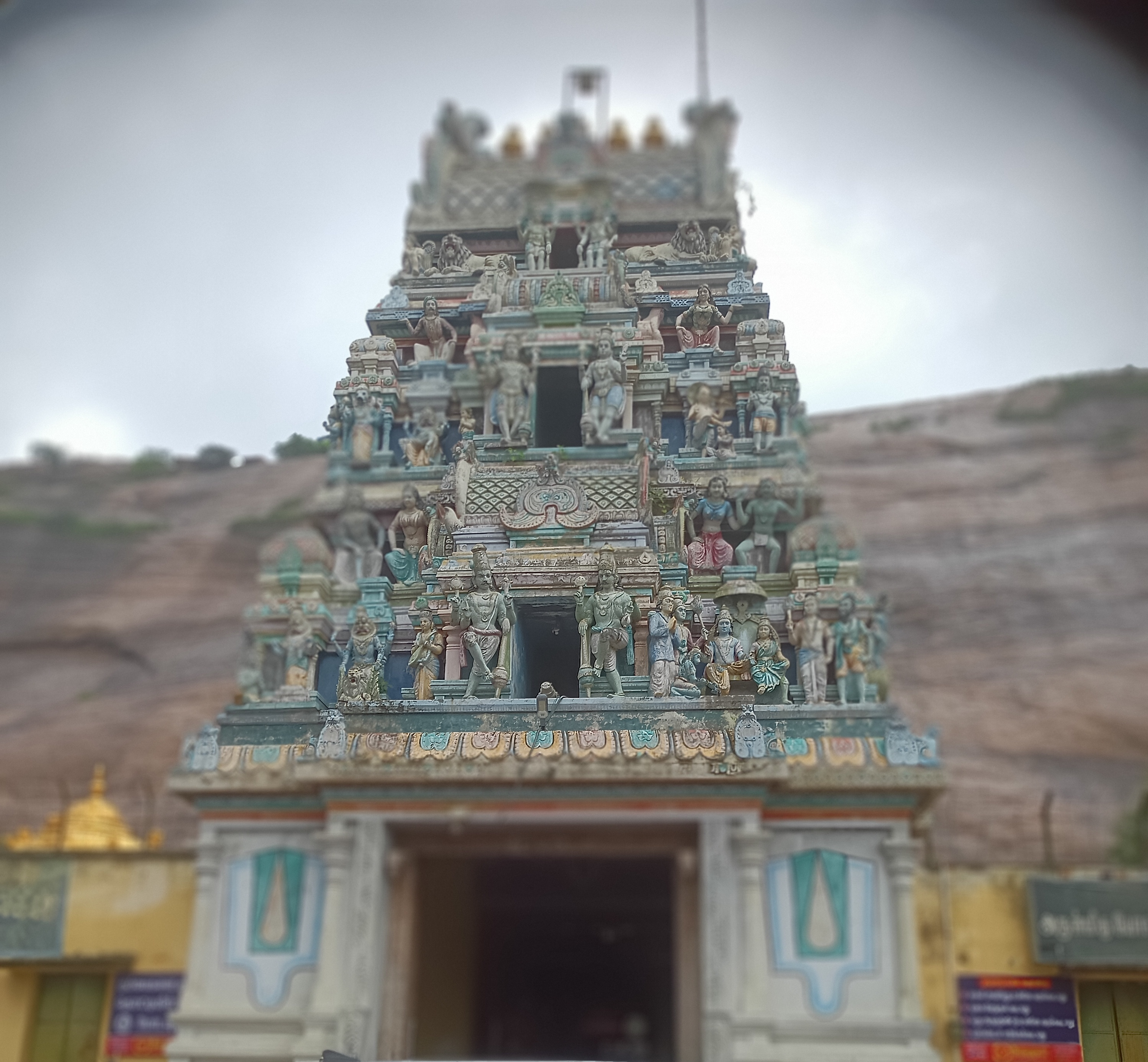

- Location in Tamil Nadu

Religion
- Affiliation: Hinduism
- District: Madurai
- Deity: Yoga Narasimhar temple(Vishnu)

Location
- State: Tamil Nadu
- Country: India
- Coordinates: 9°58′00″N 78°11′20″E

Architecture
- Type: Dravidian architecture
- Completed: 770 CE

Narasingam is a village located 8 km from Madurai on the road to Melur, in the Indian state of Tamil Nadu. It is named for the nearby cave temple dedicated to Yoga Narasimha Perumal, at the foot of the Yanaimalai hills. This temple was constructed in 770 CE by Madurakavi alias Marankaari who was the minister of the Madurai King Parantaka Nedunjadaiyan. There is a front mandapam (court). The sculpture of Narasinga Perumal is carved out of the hill itself. The temple is a good example of the cave sculpturing of the Pandya Kingdom. In front of this there is a stone temple for the goddess Narasingavalli. This place is situated between two holy places — Alagar Koyil in the north and Thirumohur in the east.

== Legend ==
According to the Sthala Purana for the Madurai Koodal Azhagar Temple, sage Romasa had installed the Narasimha icon in a cave in the hill. And the 87th chapter of the Uttara Kanda of the Brahmanda Purana says the sage did penance on the banks of the Padma Thadagam, as it was filled with lotus flowers, near the Gajagiri Kshetram (the present Anaimalai) seeking progeny, and wanted the Lord to appear in His Narasimha avatar. The Lord appeared as Ugra Narasimha and the heat that emanated from Him was unbearable. Even the celestials were affected by it and they all came to Gajagiri Kshetram and prayed to the Lord to calm down. The Lord could not be pacified and then they sought the help of Prahlada, whose arrival quietened Him to some extent. They prayed to the Goddess Mahalakshmi, who also took Her abode in Him as Narasingavalli, after which He became Yoga Narasimha. The Lord later granted the boon sought by the sage.

According to another legend, Lord Siva was afflicted by Brahma Hathi Dosham (a curse that descends upon a Hindu if he murders a Vedic Brahman) after He plucked one of the five heads of Lord Brahma. He was relieved of it after He took a bath in the holy water source there, also known as Chakra Theertham, and He worshipped Lord Narasimha. It is believed that taking a dip in the Chakra Theertham, which is near the temple, rids one of all sins.

=== Thiruvilayadal Purana ===
The Thiruvilaiyadal Purana, written by Perumbatta Puliyur Nambi and later amended by Paranjothi Munivar, says that the Chola king, who could not win the battle against the Pandya ruler, sought the help of Jains. They created a giant elephant using their mystic powers and directed it to kill the Pandya king and destroy his capital. But the Pandya prayed to Lord Siva to save him and his capital. The Lord sent to him the "Narasinga Asthram" (the eight lettered word Namonarayana), which turned the elephant into a hill. To commemorate this event, a stone elephant was installed in Madurai near the Vaigai facing the north, which is found near the Yanaikkal bridge even today. Inscriptions in the cave temple say that Maran Kari, the minister of the Pandya king, started the construction of the temple in 770 CE, which remained unfinished, either due to his death or due to some other calamity, and was completed by his brother Maran Eyinan later. He also built the Muka Mandapa and consecrated the temple.

== Architecture ==
The fort around Azhagarkoil is also known as Iranyan Kottai, and even now a stone icon of Lord Yoga Narasimha is found atop its entrance. A big icon of Yoga Narasimha, found in the outer prakaram (closed precincts of a temple) of the Azhagarkoil temple, known as "Jwala Narasimhar", is said to be ferocious. To pacify Him, regular Thirumanjanam (a bathing ritual) is performed with gingelly oil. A hole is found in the ceiling above the icon which is believed to let out the fire emanating from it.

The foot of the hill, where the Narasimha temple is located is known as Narasingam or Hasthigiri or Gajagiri. There one may find the Maha Mandapam, Garuda Mandapam and Mukha Mandapam of the Pandya period. The shrine of the Goddess Narasingavalli faces south, at the entrance. Inscriptions say that there was also an agraharam for Vedic Brahmins, but there is no trace of it now. The temple bustles with activity during the Narasimha Jayanthi festival, and on Masi Maham day, when Sri Kalamega Perumal of Thirumohur visits this place for the Gajendra Moksha festival. The temple is unique for its utsava icon of Narasimha in a standing posture with the Sudarsana and Panchajanya in His upper two hands while the left lower hand holds the Gathai (club weapon) and the right is in the Abhaya Hastha posture (blessing pose).

== Inscriptions ==
The inscriptions at the temple are in ancient Tamil, Brahmi and Vattezhuthu. There are two inscriptions of Srivallabha Pandya (1101–1124 CE), which speak about the gifts made to the temple. There are also inscriptions of later Pandyas and one of them, belonging to the rule of Sundara Pandya (1216–1238 CE), gives details about his conquest of the Chola country. Another inscription says that land gifts were made at Iyakkimangalam village for conducting the festival in the Anaimalai Temple. Later inscriptions are mostly incomplete. The Yoga Narasimha icon at the temple is six feet high, sculpted on the hill itself.

== Gallery ==
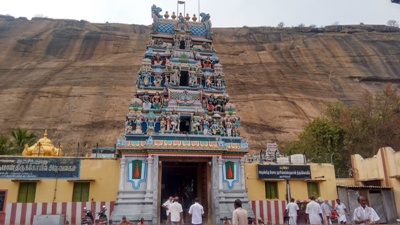

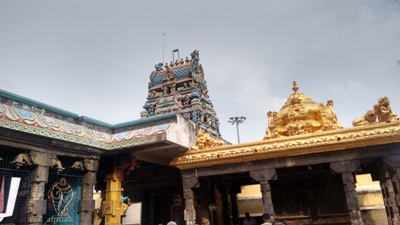

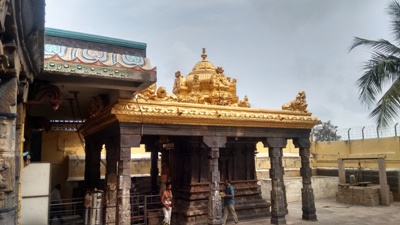

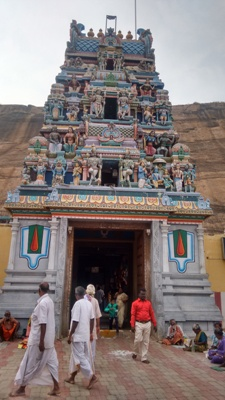

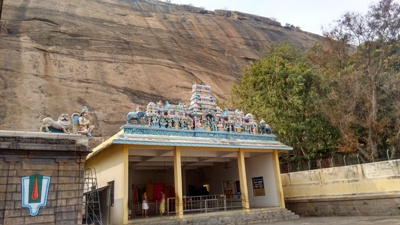

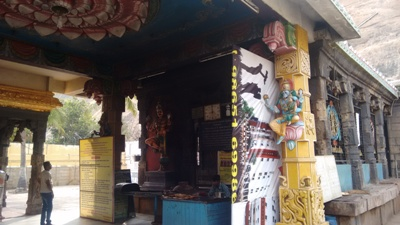

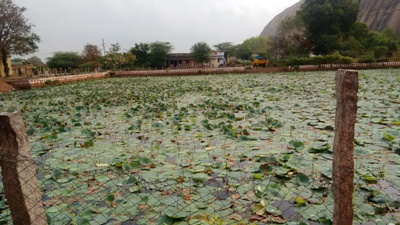
