= Valliyur Subramanya Swamy Temple =

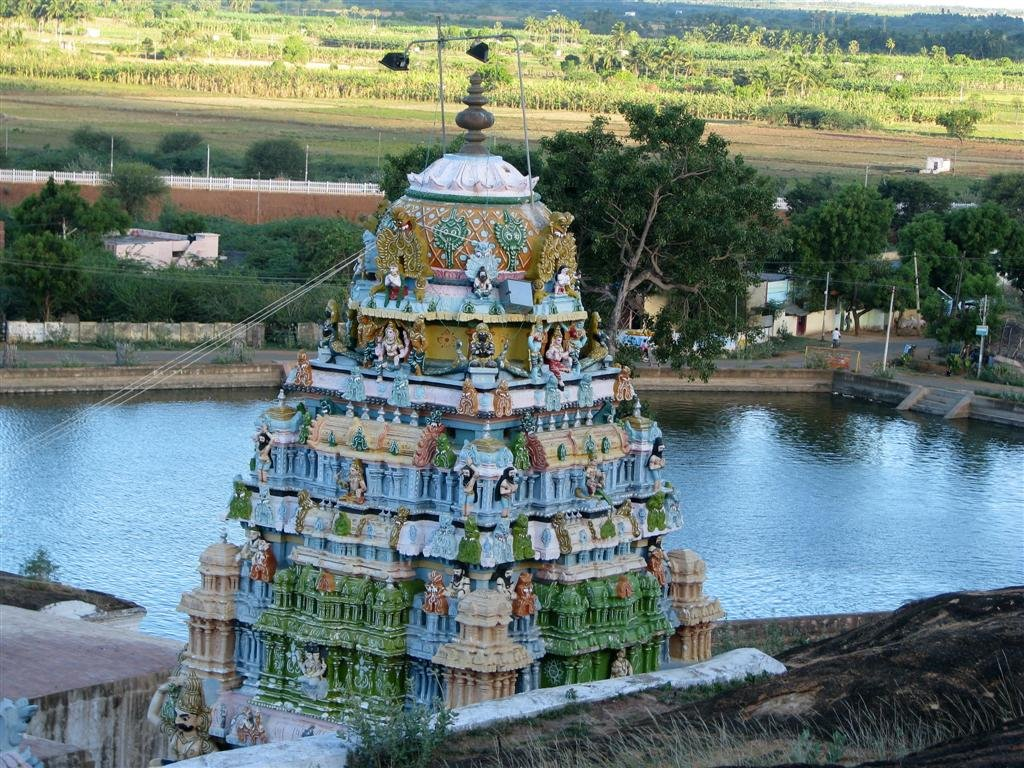
- Valliyur Subramanya Swamy Temple

- Subramanya Swamy Temple, Valliyur, Tirunelveli, Tamil Nadu

Religion
- Affiliation: Hinduism
- District: Tirunelveli
- Deity: Anantha Kalyana Subramanyar
- Festival: Chitrai festival

Location
- Location: Valliyur
- State: Tamil Nadu
- Country: India
- Interactive map of Valliyur Subramanya Swamy Temple
- Coordinates: 8.380383°N 77.614557°E

Architecture
- Type: Dravidian architecture

Specifications
- Temple: One
- Elevation: 125.21 m (411 ft)

Subramanya Swamy Temple is a Hindu temple situated at Valliyur in Tirunelveli of Tamil Nadu in the peninsular India. The sanctum of the temple is a rock-cut hill.

A diamond studded spear is held by the main deity Subramanyar here.

This temple is revered by the hymns of Thiruppugallh, composed by Arunagirinathar, the Tamil Shaiva Saint-Poet.

== Location ==
This temple is located at an altitude of about 125.21 metres (410.8 ft) above the mean sea level with the geographic coordinates of (8.380383°N 77.614557°E) at Valliyur.

== Maintenance ==
The temple is maintained under the Hindu Religious and Charitable Endowments Department, Government of Tamil Nadu.

== Deities ==
Apart from Subramanyar, His consort Valli, Nataraja and Dakshinamurti are the other deities who bless the devotees in this temple.

== Gallery ==
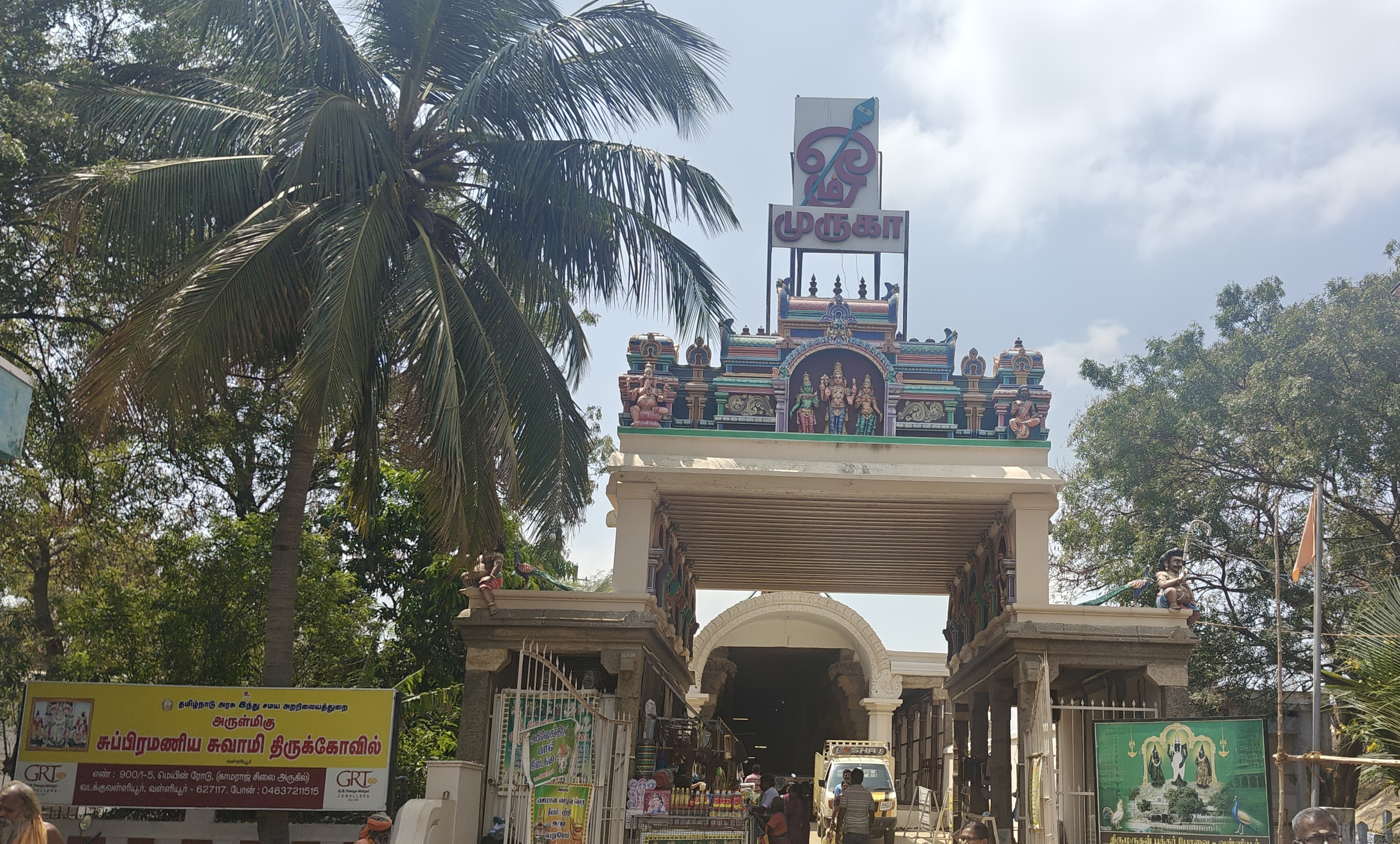
Temple entrance

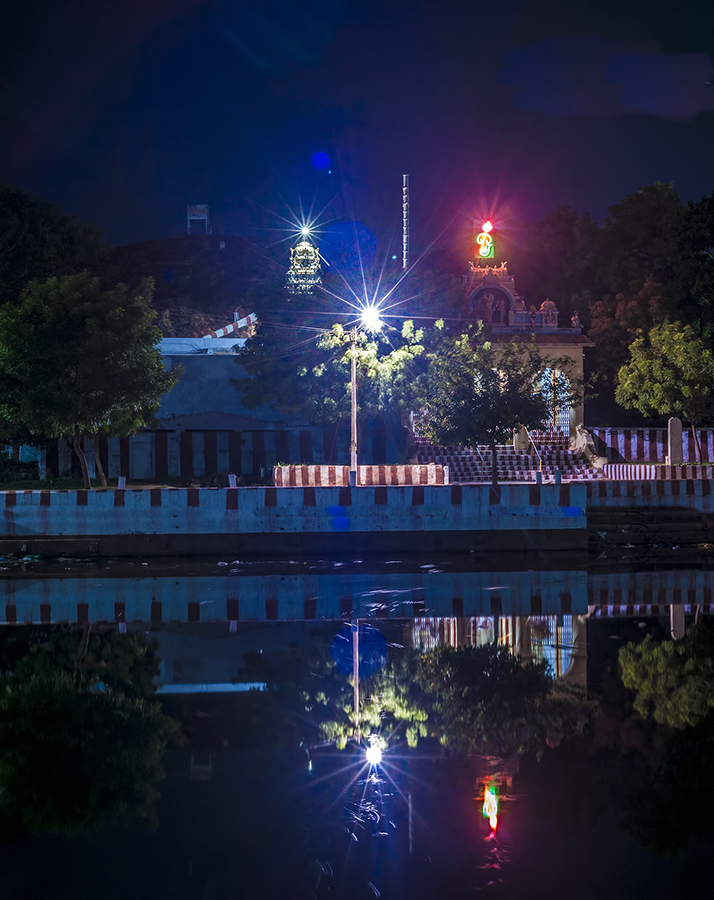
During night
