= List of rock-cut temples in India =

This is a partial list of Indian rock-cut temples by state or union territory.

== Andhra Pradesh ==
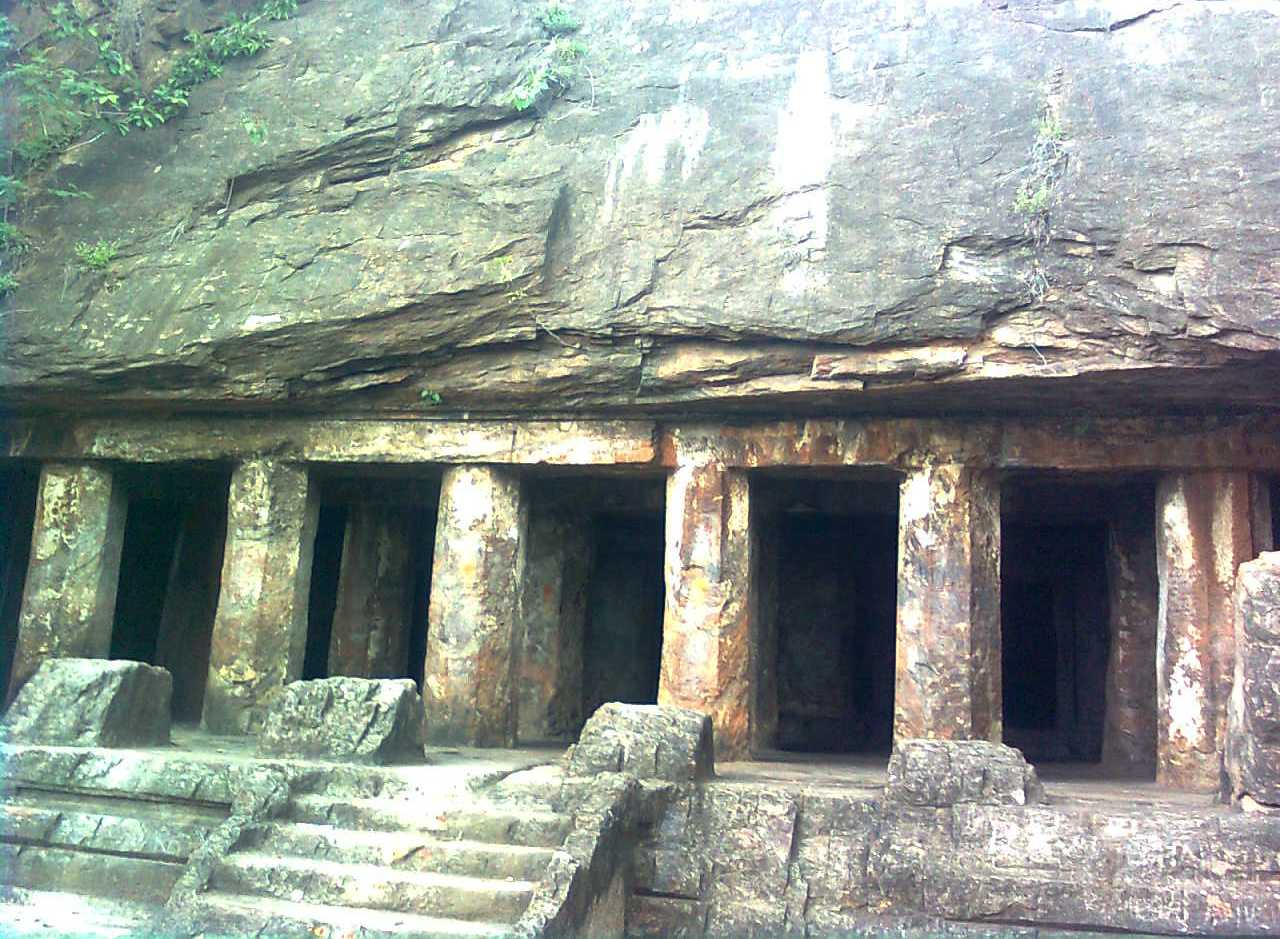
Akkanna Madanna Caves, Vijayawada

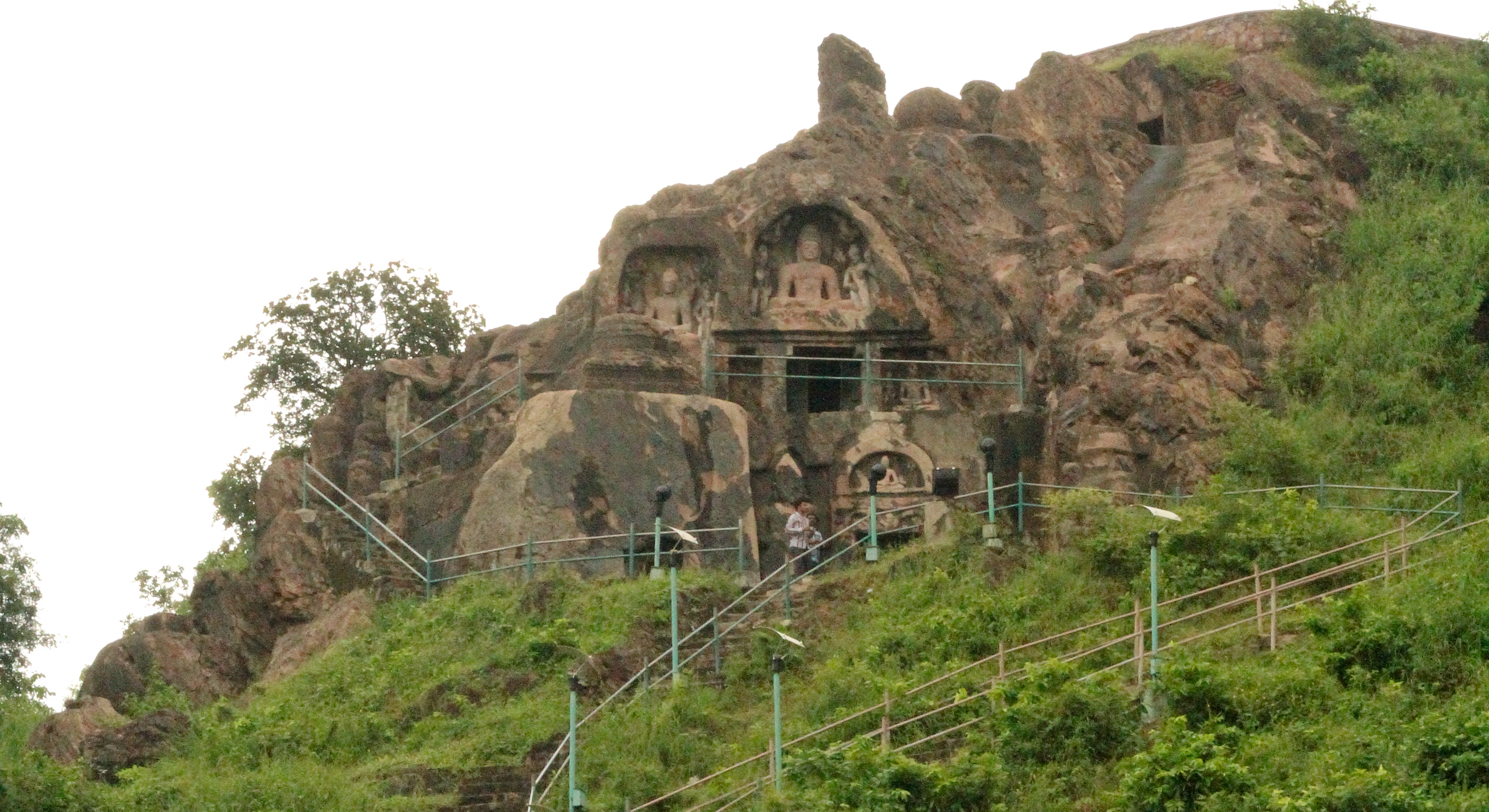
Bojjannakonda Caves and Hilltop Monastery, Anakapalle, Visakhapatnam district

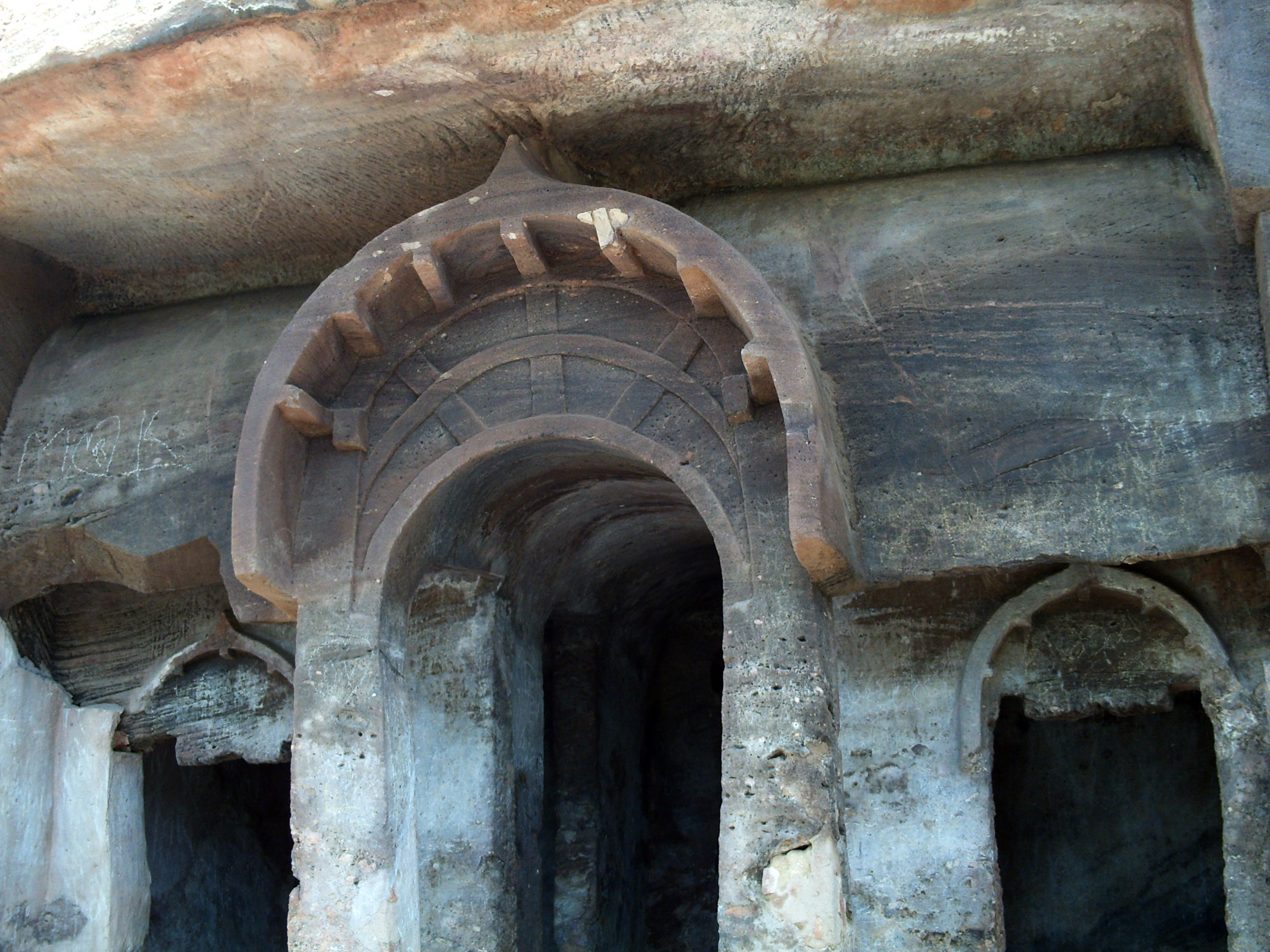
Caves at Guntupalle

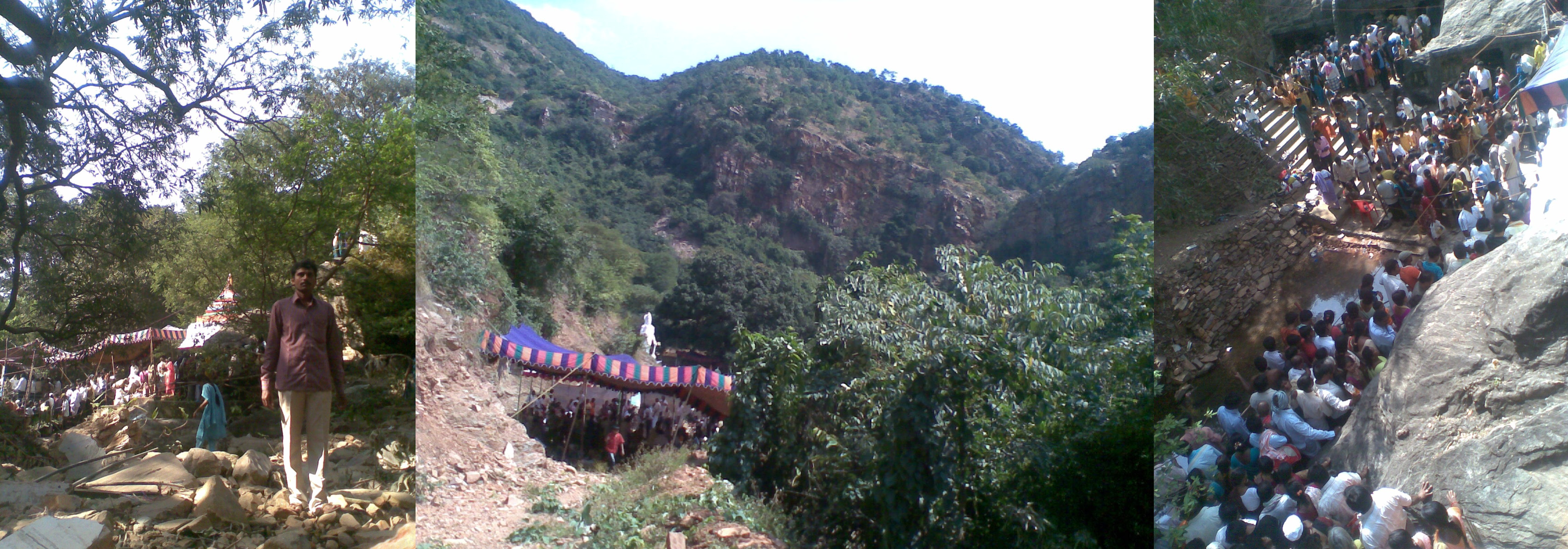
Bhairava Kona

- Akkanna Madanna Caves, Vijayawada
- Belum Caves, Kurnool district
- Bhairavakona Caves, Hindu temple caves located at Ambavaram Kothapalli, CS Pur Mandal, Prakasam district
- Bodhikonda and Ghanikonda Caves, Ramatheertham, Vizianagaram district
- Bojjannakonda and Lingalakonda, Anakapalle, Visakhapatnam district
- Borra Caves, Aruku Valley, Visakhapatnam district
- Guntupalle Caves (near Dwaraka Tirumala), West Godavari district, popularly known as "Andhra Ajanta", believed to pre-date even the Ajanta and Ellora caves of Maharashtra
- Mogalrajapuram Caves
- Undavalli Caves, Guntur district
- Srimukhalingam, Srikakulam district

== Assam ==
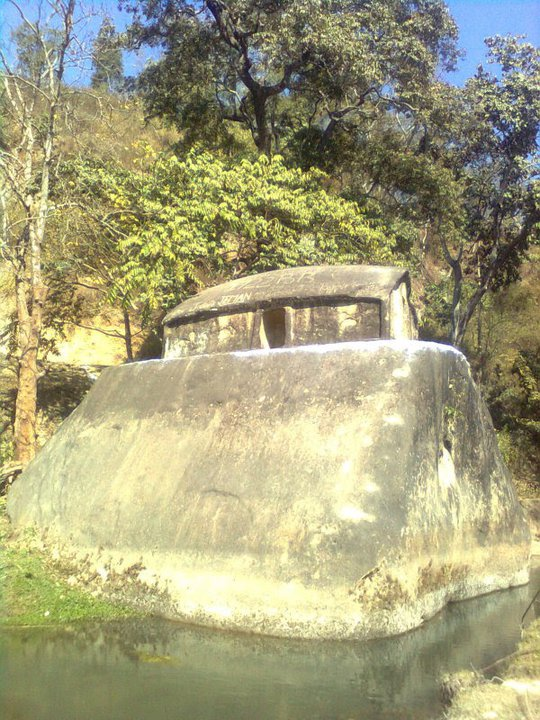
Cave temple at Maibong

- Longthaini Noh, Maibong, Dima Hasao
- Dudhnath, jogighopa, Bongaigaon

== Bihar ==
- Son Bhandar Caves
- Barabar Caves
- Lomas Rishi Caves

== Goa ==
- Harvalem Caves, Sanquelim, Goa 403505, c. 6th century.

== Gujarat ==
- Dhank Caves
- Junagadh Buddhist Cave Groups, Junagadh district
- Bava Pyara Caves
- Kadia Dungar Caves
- Khambhalida Caves
- Sana Caves
- Siyot Caves, Lakhpat Taluka, Kutch district
- Talaja Caves, Bhavnagar district

== Haryana ==
None of these have been studied scientifically yet.

- Dhosi Hill cave temple in Aravalli Mountain Range, Narnaul, Mahendragarh district
- Nar Narayan Cave Temple in Sivalik Hills range, Yamuna Nagar district
- Tosham Hill cave temple in Aravalli Mountain Range, Hisar-Tosham road, Bhiwani district

== Himachal Pradesh ==
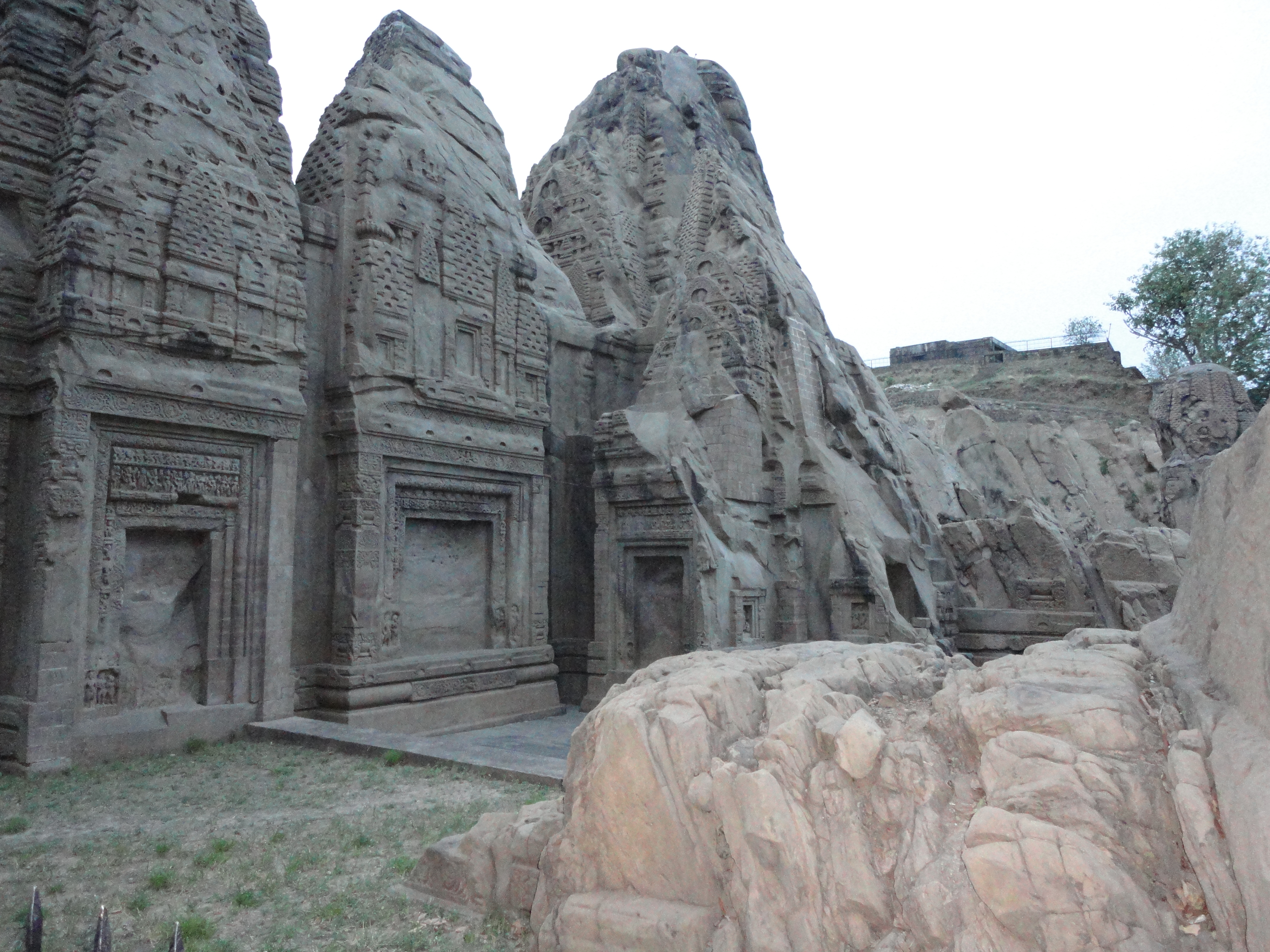
Rock Cut Temple, Masroor

- Masroor Rock Cut Temple

Fifteen rock-cut temples in the Indo-Aryan style are richly carved. This is a unique monolithic structure in the sub-Himalayan region. The main shrine contains three stone images of Rama, Lakshmana and Sita. The temple complex is located on a hill and has a large rectangular water pond. The temple complex is believed to have been built by the Pandava during their exile; the exact date is not known. The ancient name of the city Kangra was Bhimnagar, founded by Bhima, one of the Pandava brothers.

== Karnataka ==
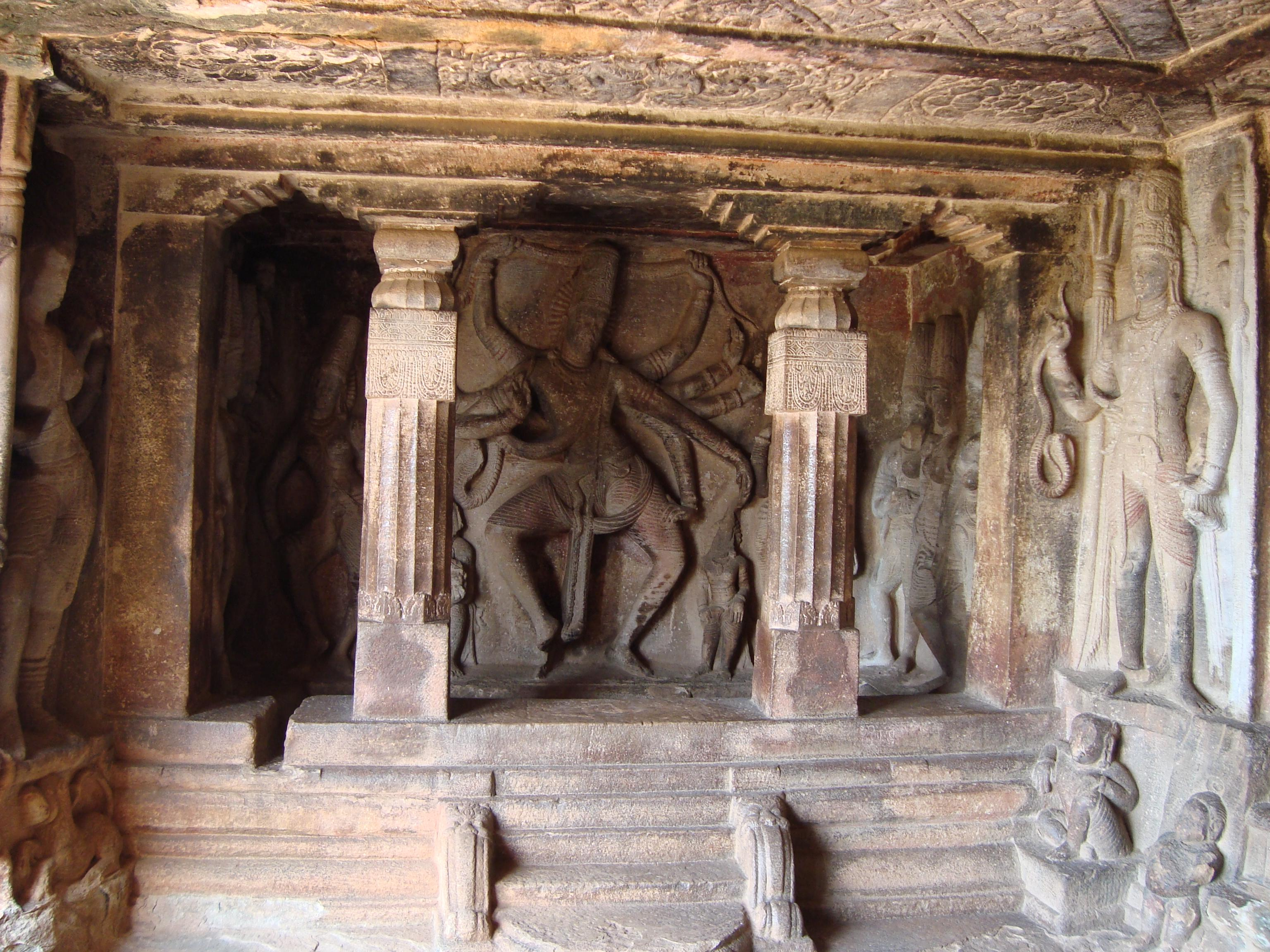
Ravana Phadi cave, Aihole, in Karnataka

- Aihole
- Pattadakal
- Badami cave temples
- Gavi Gangadhareshwara Temple
- Hulimavu Shiva cave temple
- Narasimha Jharni
- Nellitheertha Cave Temple

== Jammu and Kashmir ==
- Amarnath Temple (pahalgam) (Kashmir)
- Vaishno Devi Temple (katra) (Jammu)

== Kerala ==
- Airurpara
- Ambukuthi mala
- Edakkal Caves
- Irunilamcode
- Kallil Temple
- Kaviyoor
- Kottukal
- Trikkur Mahadeva Temple
- Nedumala caves, Piralimattam
- Thovarimala Ezhuthupara
- Tuvarankad
- Vizhinjam

== Madhya Pradesh ==
- Bagh Caves
- Bhimbetka rock shelters
- Lohani Caves
- Udaygiri Caves

== Maharashtra ==
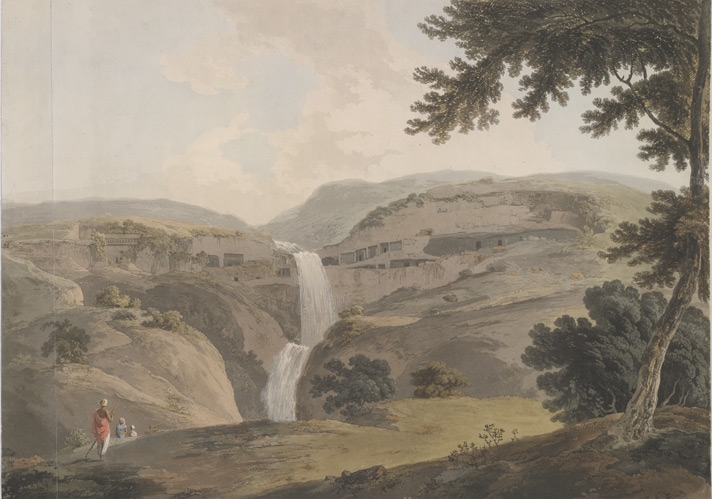
Painting of the mountain of Ellora, by Thomas Daniell (1803)

- Ajanta Caves – Buddhist
- Aurangabad Caves – Buddhist
- Bedse Caves – Buddhist
- Bhaja Caves – Buddhist
- Dharashiv Caves - Jain, Buddhist
- Elephanta Caves – Buddhist, Hindu, Brahmanical
- Ellora Caves – Hindu, Buddhist, Jain
- Jogeshwari Caves – Buddhist
- Kanheri Caves – Buddhist
- Karla Caves – Buddhist
- Kharosa Caves - Buddhist, Hindu, Jain
- Kondana Caves - Buddhist
- Kondivita Caves – Buddhist
- Lenyadri – Buddhist
- Mahakali Caves – Buddhist
- Mandapeshwar Caves – Buddhist, Hindu
- Pandavleni Caves – Buddhist
- Pataleshwar Caves, Pune – Hindu
- Pitalkhora Caves - Buddhist
- Bahrot Caves - Zoroastrian
- Manmodi Caves - Buddhist, Jain

== Odisha ==
- Ajaikapada Bhairava Temple
- Ananta Shayana
- Ananta Vasudeva Temple
- Anantasaayi Vishnu Temple
- Annakoteshvara Temple
- Bhattarika Temple
- Brahma Temple, Bindusagar
- Brahma Temple, Niali
- Brahmeswara
- Chateshwar Temple
- Chausath Jogini Mandir
- Dhabaleswar
- Dharakote
- Durga Temple, Baideshwar
- Durga Temple, Motia
- Gupteswar Cave
- Harihara Deula, Boudh
- Harishankar Temple
- Jagannath Temple
- Kapilash Temple
- Kedareswar Temple
- Khiching
- Kichakeshwari Temple
- Konark
- Lingaraja Temple
- Lokanatha Temple
- Maa Ugra Tara
- Mahavinayak Temple
- Mahendragiri, Orissa
- Manikeshwari Temple
- Markandeshwar Temple
- Mukteswar Temple
- Narayana Gosain Temple
- Nilamadhav Temple
- Nrusinghanath Temple
- Panchalingeshwar
- Parsurameswar Temple
- Patali Srikhetra
- Ranipur-Jharial
- Rajarani Temple
- Ramachandi Temple
- Rameshwar Deula
- Sakshigopal Temple
- Saptamatruka Temple
- Simhanath Temple
- Subarnameru Temple
- Sureswari temple
- Udayagiri and Khandagiri Caves
- Upper Bagh Devi Temple
- Vaital Deula
- Varahi Deula, Chaurasi
- Yajna Nrisimha Temple
- Yameshwar Temple

== Tamil Nadu ==
- Armamalai Cave
- Atiranachanda Cave Temple, Saluvankuppam village
- Andimalai Stone beds, Cholapandiyapuram
- Dalavanur
- Ennayira Malai
- Pillaiyarpatti – dedicated to Lord Ganesha
- Kalugumalai Jain Beds
- Vettuvan Koil
- Kalugasalamoorthy Temple
- Kalugumalai
- Kalugumalai Jain Beds
- Kanchiyur Jain cave and stone beds
- Kudumiyanmalai temple
- Kupalantham Poigai malai Jain Cave Temple
- Kuranganil Muttam
- Mahabalipuram
- Mahendravadi (near Arakonam)
- Mamandur (near Kanchi)
- Mandagapattu Tirumurti Temple (Mahendra Pallava's)
- Mangulam
- Namakkal – Lord Narasimha's cave temple
- Namakkal – Lord Ranganatha's cave temple
- Narthamalai
- Adukkankal, Nehanurpatti
- Kurathimalai, Onampakkam
- Panchapandavar Malai
- Pechipalai temple
- Rockfort Ucchi Pillayar Temple
- Satyamurthi Perumal temple
- Samanar Hills
- Singaperumalkoil – Lord Ugra Narasimha resides inside a cave in yoga posture
- Senji Singavaram Ranganatha Temple
- Sittanavasal Cave
- Sivan kovil-Arittapatti
- Seeyamangalam
- Shri Brahadambal Temple, Thirukkokarnam
- Sri Balasubramaniaswami Temple - Valli Malai (Valli Malai, Vellore district)
- Thalavanur
- Thirakoil
- Thirumayam – Lord Perumal in standing and lying position (Anantasayanam)
- Thirunadhikkara Cave Temple
- Thiruparankundram – dedicated to Lord Muruga
- Thiruvellarai
- Tirukalukundram (on hilltop) - 6th-century temple
- Tirumalai (Jain complex)
- Varaha Cave Temple
- Adi varahaswamy temple, Dharmapuri
- Vishnu temple – Malayadipatti

== Uttarakhand ==
- Patal Bhuvaneshwar

== See also ==
- Cave research in India
- Indian rock-cut architecture
- List of caves
- List of caves in India
- List of colossal sculptures in situ
- Speleology
