= Mausimaa Temple =

Coordinates: 19.710478°N 84.754215°E

Religion
- Affiliation: Hinduism
- District: Ganjam District
- Deity: Ardhasini

Location
- Location: Kulada
- State: Odisha
- Country: India

Mausimaa Temple is an ancient shrine located in Kulada, a village also contains the Bagh Devi temple, in Ganjam District of Odisha, India. It is about 8 km from Bhanjanagar.

The presiding deity of the temple is Ardhasini, maternal aunt (or Mausi Maa) of Jagannath.

The temple celebrates its festival during the Ratha Yatra held in the Jagannath Temple (Puri). During the rainy season (Asadha Masa), typically in June or July, the deities Jagannath, Balabhadra, and Subhadra are brought out from Jagannath Temple and carried on chariots to Mausimaa Temple via the main high street in Puri.

Upper Bagh Devi Temple and Ratneswar Mahadev temple are shrines nearby.
