= Brahma Temple =

Brahma Temple may refer to:

- Brahma Temple (Grand Canyon), a summit in the Grand Canyon, USA
- Brahma Temple, Khajuraho, a temple in Madhya Pradesh, India
- Brahma Temple, Bindusagar, a temple in Odisha, India
- Brahma Temple, Niali, a temple in Odisha, India
- Brahma Temple, Pushkar, a temple in Rajasthan, India
- Brahma Temple, Asotra a temple in Asotra Rajasthan, India
- Brahma Temple, Prambanan, a temple in Central Java, Indonesia
- Brahma Temple, Bramha Karmali, a temple in Goa, India

== See also ==
- Category:Brahma temples
