= Narasimha Jharni =

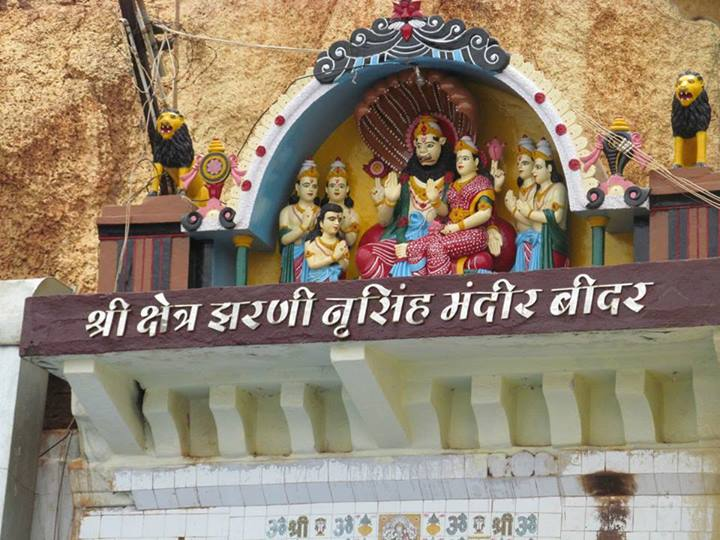
- Narasimha Zarni Cave Temple in Bidar, Karnataka

- Location in Karnataka Narasimha Jharni (India)

Religion
- Affiliation: Hinduism
- District: Bidar district
- Deity: Narasimha (Incarnation of Lord Vishnu)
- Governing body: Shri Narasimha Jharni Samsthan

Location
- Location: Malkapur Road, NH 161B, Mangalpet, Pakalwada, Bidar - 585401
- State: Karnataka
- Country: India
- Coordinates: 17.9031°N 77.5439°E

Specifications
- Temple: 1
- Elevation: 627 m (2,057 ft)

Narasimha Jharni Temple (local kannada: ನರಸಿಂಹ ಝರನಿ), also known as Narasimha Jharni cave temple, is a temple located in Malkapur Road, NH 161B, Mangalpet, Pakalwada, Bidar - 585401, Karnataka. It is associated with Lord Narasimha, an incarnation (avatar) of the Hindu god Vishnu. The ancient temple is excavated in a 300 m tunnel under the Manichoola hill range situated at around 4.8 km from the city. The temple is Classified as one of the 108 Abhimana Kshethram of Vaishnavate tradition.

== Temple description ==
Bats can be seen hanging on the roof of the cave and flying throughout the tunnel. People utter the words govinda-govinda and narasimha hari-hari as mantras. The end of the cave temple is the sanctum sanctorum which houses two deities – Lord Narasimha and a Shiva Linga which the demon Jharasura (Jalasura) had worshipped. Around eight people can stand and watch this sight as there is little space in there. Others need to wait in the water for their turn.

== Significance ==
People throng to this temple because it is believed that the Deity at the Narasimha Jharni Cave temple is a swayambhu roopam – in other words, the deity is self manifested and is very powerful.

== Recent developments ==
To facilitate the devotees, the cave temple has been Air conditioned and Electrified for lighting systems. The temple is open from 8 a.m. to 6 p.m. The facilities at the temple are planned in a systematic way to draw more visitors. Creation of parking space, multi-purpose hall, rooms, overhead tank to ensure adequate water supply to the devotees and a percolation tank to make use of the water coming out of the cave has been taken up.

== See also ==
- List of India cave temples
