= Upendra Bhanja =

Odia poet

Kabi Samrāṭa Upendra Bhanja Bīrabara
- ଉପେନ୍ଦ୍ର ଭଞ୍ଜ
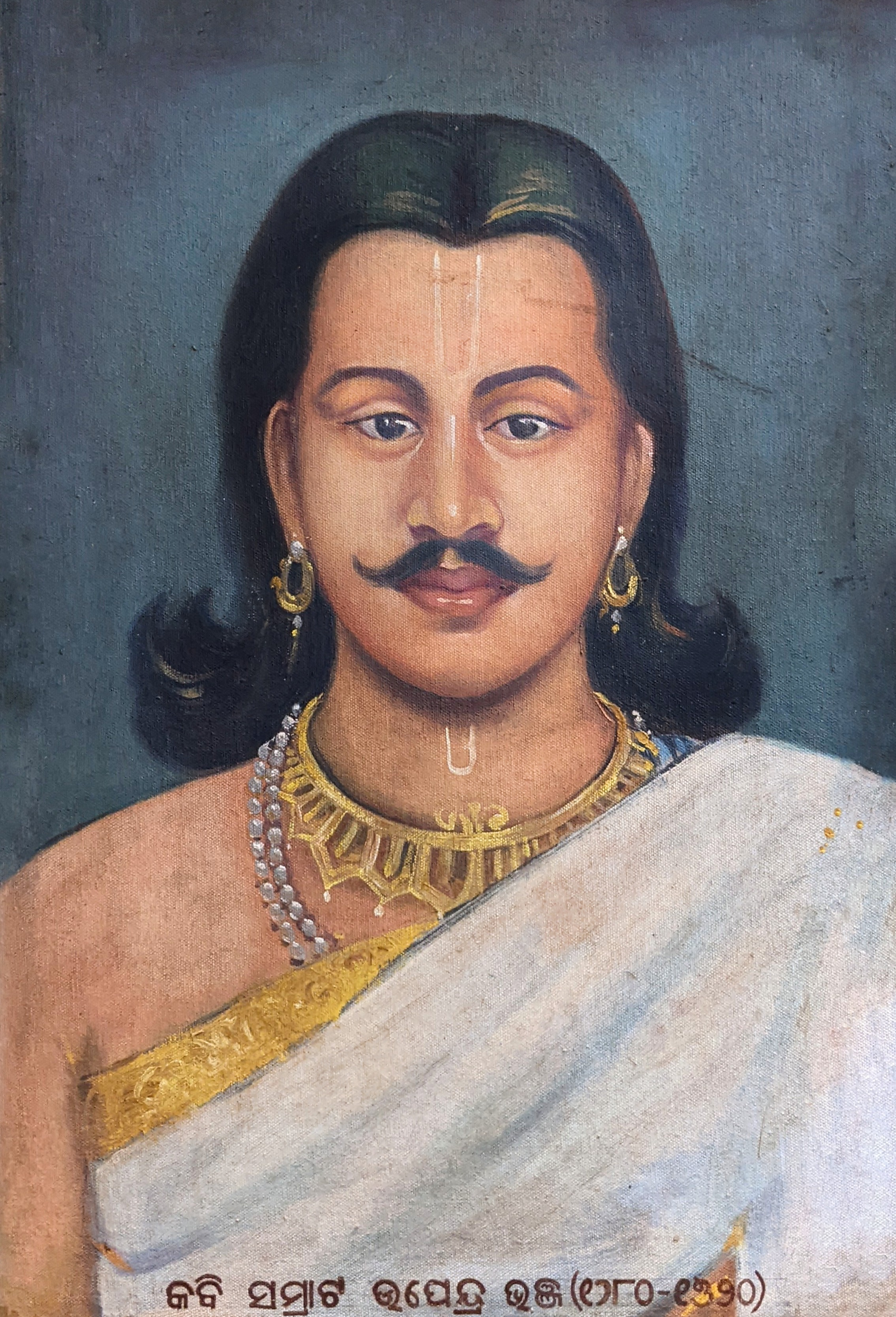
- Born: Kulagarh (present-day Kulada, Ganjam, Odisha, India)
- Died: 1740 (Not Confirmed)
- Occupations: King & Poet
- Writing career
- Language: Odia
- Period: Riti juga or Bhanja juga
- Genre: Odissi music
- Notable work: Baidehisha Bilasa

Kabi Samrata Upendra Bhanja, Odia: [upend̪ɾɔ bʰɔɲd͡ʒɔ]) was a 17th-century Odia poet and a composer of classical Odissi music. He is most known for his Odissi songs and kabyas written in the Odia language, primarily Baidehisa Bilasa, Labanyabati & Koti Brahmanda Sundari.

He was born during 1670 (opinions differ between 1670 and 1688) in Kulagarh, Ghumusar Zamindari, present day Kulada near Bhanjanagar, 80 kms from the Silk City Brahmapur, Odisha and died during 1740 (again opinions vary).

His first wife was the sister of the king of Nayagarh and the daughter of the king of Banapur was his second wife, who was an erudite princess and gave Upendra Bhanja poetical inspiration in an abundant measure. His grandfather King Dhananjaya Bhanja was a great poet and wrote Raghunatha Bilasa (The Ramayana), Ratna Manjari (a poetical romance) etc., which provided models to the prince for writing. But unlike his grandfather, he preferred his entire life to poetry rather than to ruling over a kingdom. He had a thorough training in Sanskrit classical literature and mastered Sanskrit dictionaries such as Amara Kosha, Trikanda Kosha and Medini Kosha. He even wrote a dictionary Geetabhidhana in Odia for helping poets. The town of Bhanjanagar is named after him. The music of Upendra Bhanja is central to Odissi music, the traditional classical music of the state of Odisha and Bhanja is widely respected as one of the greatest Odissi composers of all time.

== Kabyas ==
Upendra Bhanja wrote some 52 books of which only 22 are available now. Due to the absence of a printing press, a number of the hand-copied books have been lost. Some of his eminent kabyas are Baidehisha Bilasa (with "Ba" initial for each line), Rasalila, Brajaleela, Subhadra Parinaya(with "Sa" initial for every line), Labanyabati, Premasudhanidhi, Rasika Harabali, Subhadra Parinaya and Chitrakabya Bandodhya, Labanyabati, Koti Brahmanda Sundari, Kala Koutuka (with "Ka" initial for every line), Satisha Bilasa" (with initial 'Sa' initial every line), "Damayanti Bilasa" (with 'Da' initial each line) and "Padmabati Parinaya" (starts with 'Pa') etc.

The first published work of Upendra Bhanja is "Rasapanchaka". The first dictionary "Gita Abidhan" was written by Upendra Bhanja in Odia literature. 'Kabi Samrata' was not the first title of Upendra Bhanja. He was rather entitled as "Birabara" as written by Bhanja himself in his kabyas.

ବୀରବର ପଦ ଉପଇନ୍ଦ୍ର ମୋର ନାମ ।
ବାରେ ବାରେ ସେବାରେ ମନାଇଁ ସୀତାରାମ ।

— Chhanda 52, Baidehisha Bilasa
Translation:

Birabara is the epithet, my name is Upendra
By serving Sita and Rama have I received their grace.

The epithet Kabi Samrata is found only in the early part of 19th century in a book written by Mahendra Patnaik. Upendra Bhanja contributed 32,300 words to Odia language and literature. The obscurity of this incomparable poet of Odia literature, may be attributed to the lack of proper research. Plot and character in Bhanja literature plays a negligible role, and instread is dominated by imaginary ornamental expression by way of literary techniques of the classical Indian literature.

The study of Upendra Bhanja requires an advanced academic engagement, along with a considered appreciation of artistic and literary values. It also requires a broad familiarity with classical Indian literature and an understanding of moral and spiritual traditions.

On the other hand, his writings are being popularised by the commoners because of sensible, emotional touch with sympathetic unusual feelings of the human kind in the context of aesthetic sense and sensibility along with love and lovability of the mankind as experienced through the ages of time together.Strangely, without any deep appreciation of human value and literary appreciation with standard principles of study literature as prescribed in the research methodology and literary criticism with reference to classical Indian poetics, the poet Upendra Bhanja is being misunderstood by some pseudo critics/scholars and writers with biased opinions and unscrupulous baseless manners.

The first Ph.D thesis on Bhanja was submitted by Dr. Satyanarayan Acharya, the First Researcher on Upendra Bhanja, in the year 1978 under UGC sponsorship. Consequently, in the year 1988 Dr. Abhimanyu Baral submitted the thesis "Odia reetikabya paramparare Baidehisha Bilasa" to Utkal University, Bhubaneswar.

== Music ==
The works of Upendra Bhanja are based on Odissi classical music. He uses ragas and talas unique to the Odissi tradition and has thereby enriched the repertoire. His compositions are well-known across the state of Odisha and are frequently employed in Odissi dance as well as Gotipua, Sakhi Nata, Prahallada Nataka, Radha Prema Lila and other allied artforms. Some of the ragas frequently used by Bhanja are : Bangalasri, Baradi, Basanta, Basanta Baradi, Bibhasa Gujjari, Chinta Bhairaba, Ghantaraba, Kalahansa Kedara, Kali, Kamodi, Khanda Kamodi, Kousika, Kumbha Kamodi, Malaba, Mangala Baradi, Mangala Gujjari, Natanarayana, Nalinigouda, Pahadia Kedara, Panchama Baradi, Pattaha Manjari (Pattamanjari), Rajabije (Ranabije), Ramakeri, Sankarabharana, Soka Kamodi among others. Bhanja belonged to a family that was rooted in literature and music of the times, and his grandfather Dhananjaya Bhanja was an eminent composer of Odissi songs and the writer of a Ramayana kabya.

== Style ==
Upendra Bhanja wrote in the last decade of seventeenth and the early decades of eighteenth century and championed a style of poetry called 'Reeti' and 'Deena' in Sanskrit poetics. Though a number of poets in the seventeenth and eighteenth centuries wrote in reeti style, Upendra Bhanja is deemed to be the greatest of them all. Upendra Bhanja was a poet of unsurpassed rhetorical excellence, whether it be shringara, viraha, bhakti or karuna rasa. Upendra Bhanja had practiced his great poetic talents in using "upama", "alankara" and "rasas" in all his kabyas.

The greatness of Upendra Bhanja was in his "Alankara" use such as: Anuprasa, Jamak, etc. The style of presenting facts with comparable factors (upama) is distinguishable in his

“Baidehisha Bilasa” is the pioneer work of Upendra Bhanja as declared by the poet."Rasika Harabali" was written on the basis of his own experience at the early part of his young life.His contemporary poet of Bhakta Kabi, Dina Krushna Das as described in his work “Kala Koutuka”. The socio-cultural way of contemporary Odias are vividly described in his literature .Upendra Bhanja is not only eminent poet of Odisha but also his writings will be explained through all classical contemporary music systems of India

== See also ==
- Odia language
- List of Odia writers
- List of Indian poets
