= Kaviyoor Mahadevar Temple =

- തൃക്കവിയൂർ മഹാദേവക്ഷേത്രം
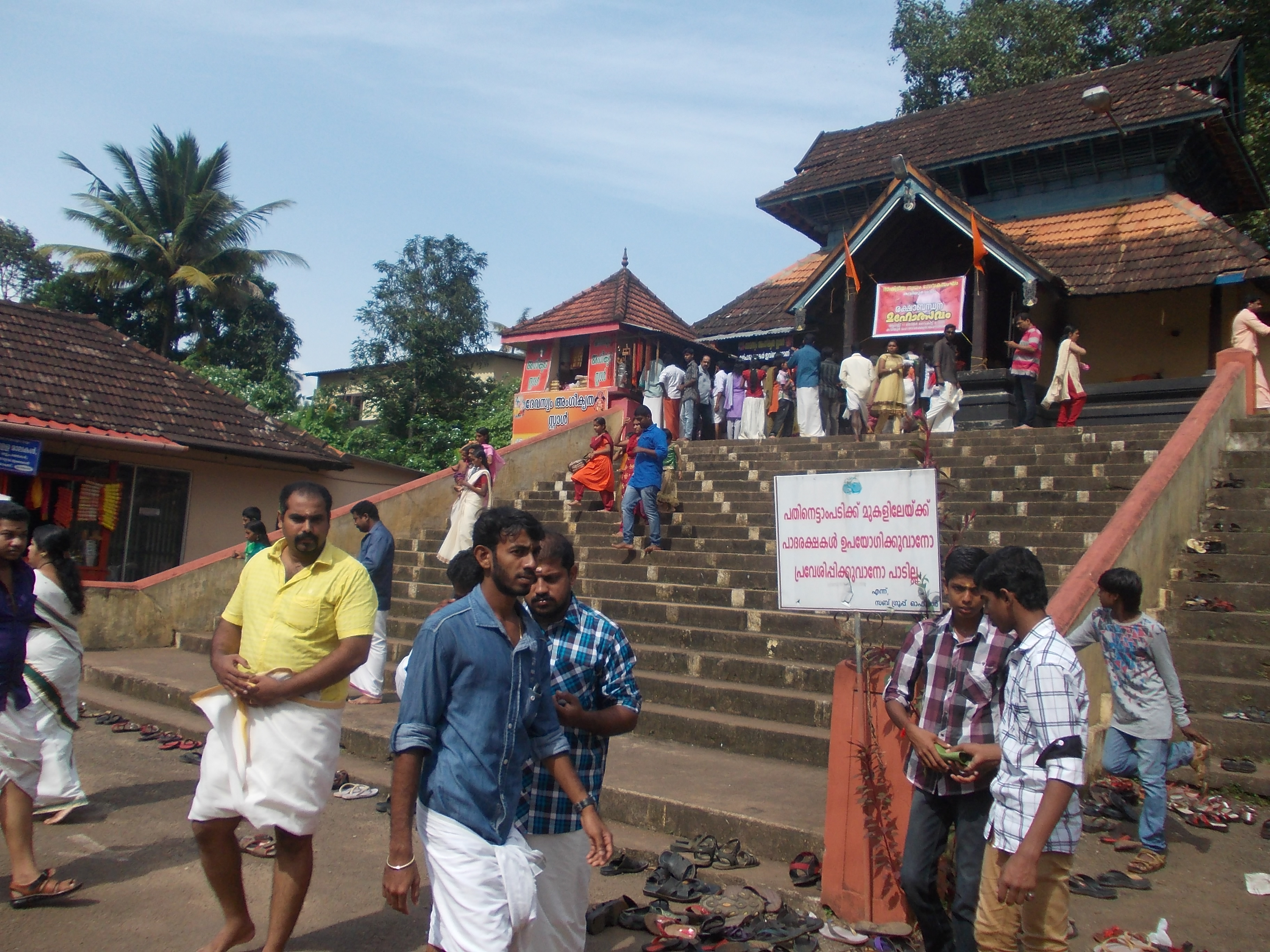

- Mahadevar Temple, Kaviyoor, Pathanamthitta, Kerala

Religion
- Affiliation: Hinduism
- District: Pathanamthitta
- Deity: Mahadeva as Thrikkaviyoorappan
- Festivals: Uthsavam (December- January), Shivarathri, Sahasrakalasam (May–June) & Panthrantu kalabham (July)

Location
- Location: Kaviyoor
- State: Kerala
- Country: India
- Coordinates: 9°23′47″N 76°36′38″E

Architecture
- Type: Kerala style
- Creator: Lord Sree Rama with Sita
- Completed: Beginning not known, 10th century AD (Current Form - Sanctum)

Specifications
- Temple: One
- Inscriptions: 2 (Two) - AD 951& 952
- Elevation: 41.73 m (137 ft)

Website
- http://www.thrikaviyoormahadevartemple.com

a view from the south east corner

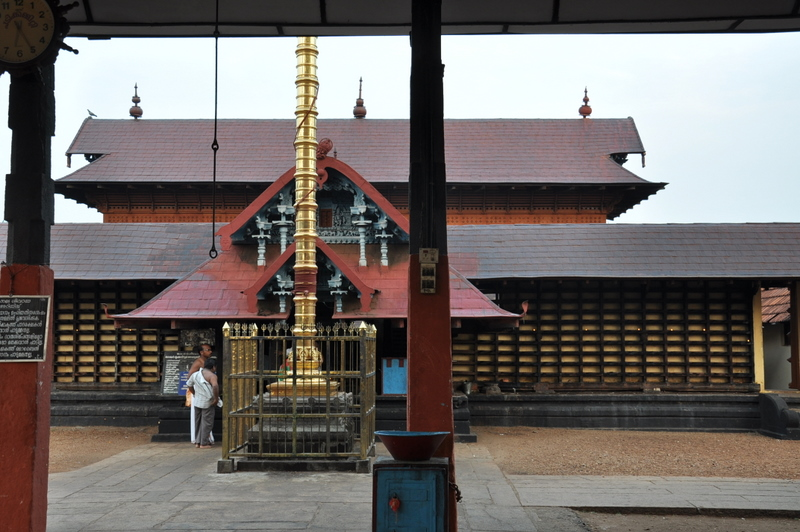
Kaviyoor Temple, Main Entrance Gate

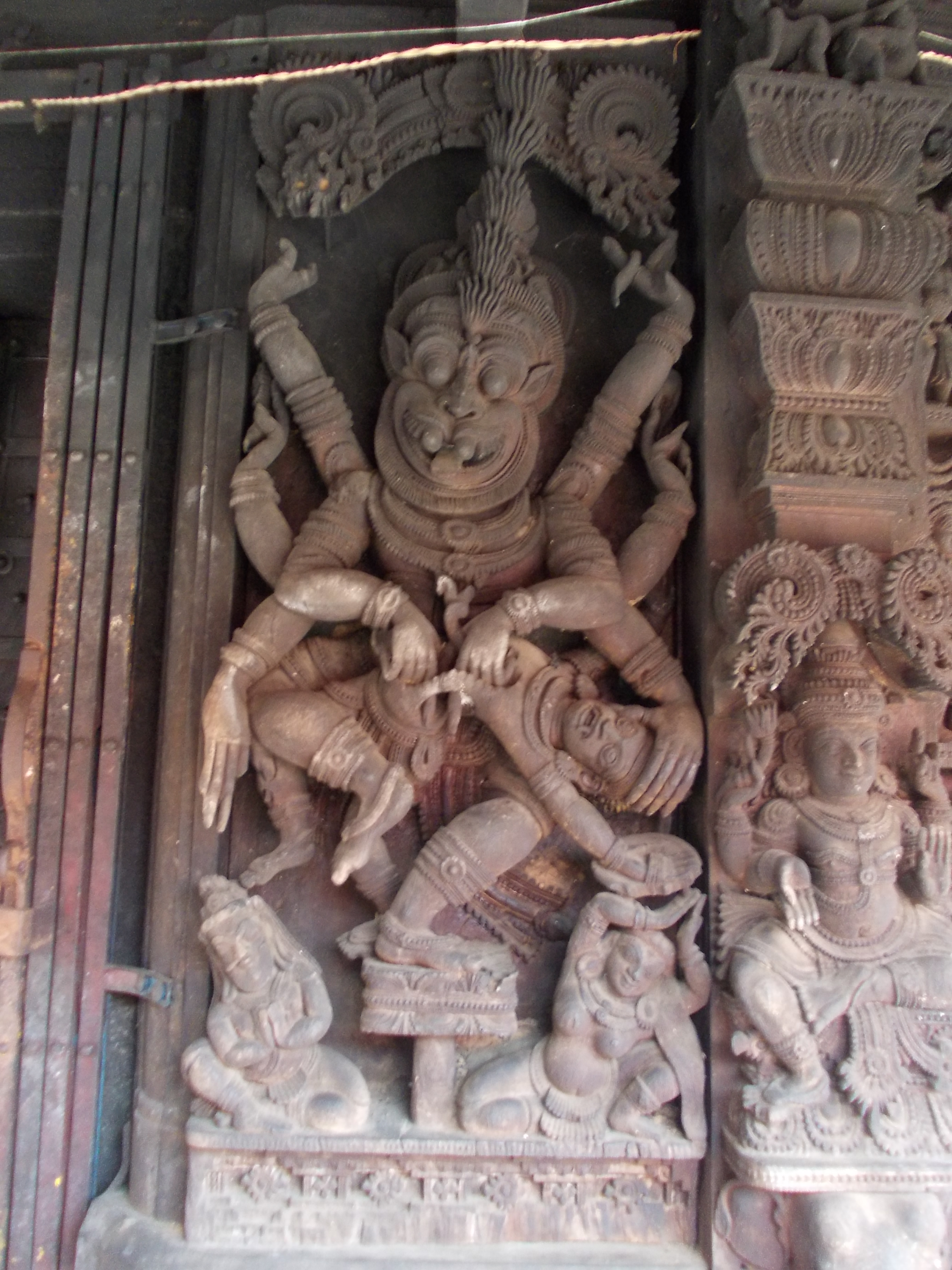
Narasimha, avatar of Vishnu slaying Hiranyakashipu

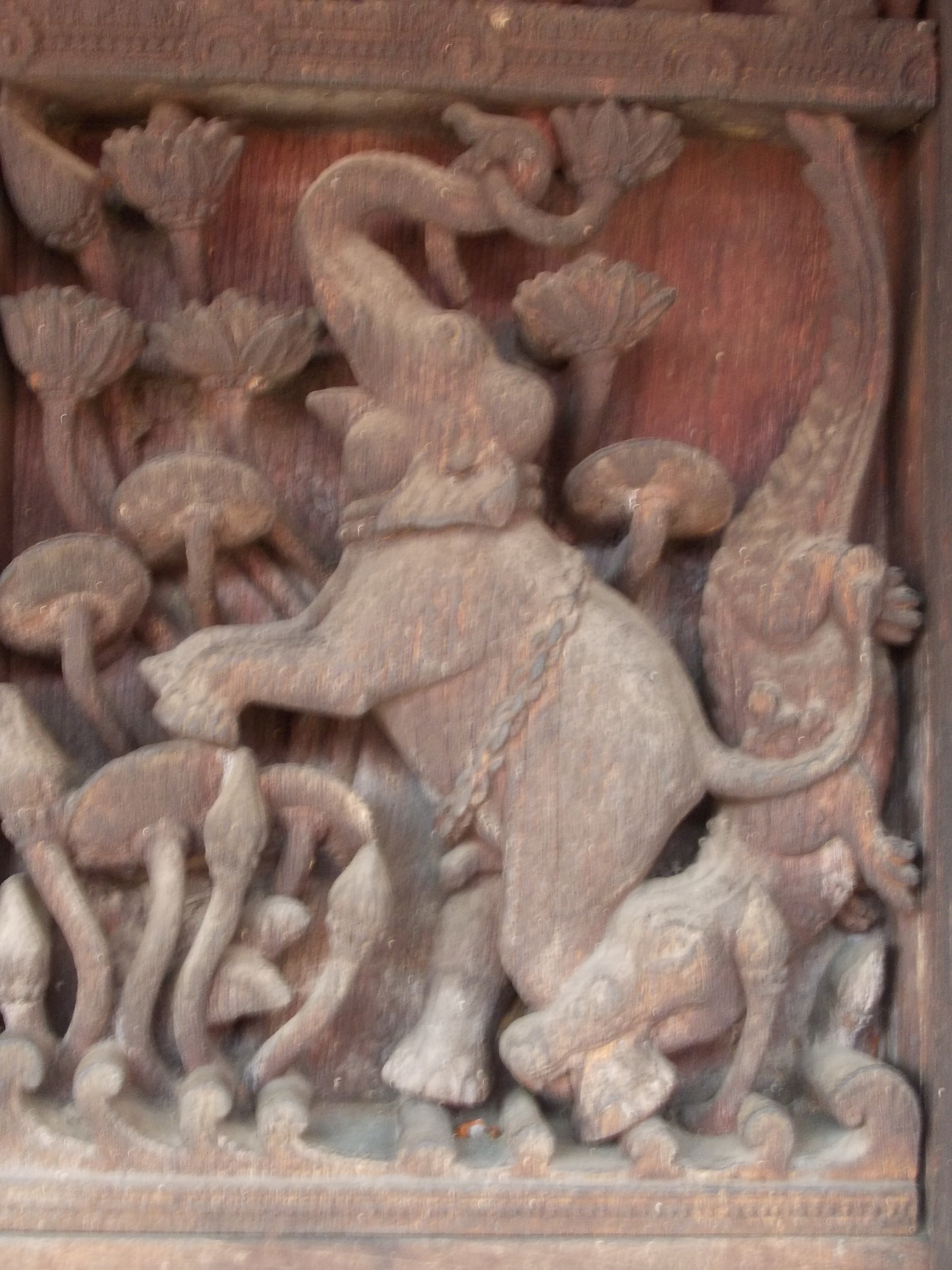
Gajendra

Kaviyoor Mahadevar Temple is one of the important Siva temples in Kerala, located in Kaviyoor, Tiruvalla Pathanamthitta District, Kerala, India. It is commonly called Thrikkaviyoor Mahadeva Temple. The main deity is Lord Mahadeva (Shiva) with Parvathi.The temple is well known for the Hanuman temple situated inside the temple complex. Kaviyoor Temple is one of the important Special Grade temples under the Travancore Devaswom Board.

== The Temple ==
Kaviyoor Mahadevar Temple is situated 200 meters west of Kaviyoor Junction in Changancherry- Kaviyoor Road, even though the main deity here is lord Shiva, Hanuman is also worshipped with significance. about five kilometres from SCS Junction in Tiruvalla. It is situated on a small hillock, and 21 wide steps leads to the majestic east Gopuram. The main entrance leads to a lengthy Anakkottil. The eastern courtyard is adorned by a Golden dhwaja( flagmast) and two high lamp-masts on either side. The fortified area is of 2 acres. The outer wall is of medium height and is made of Laterite, which was plastered with cement in recent times. The outer wall is centuries old according to records. There are Gopurams in the southern and western side. In the northern side a long Oottupura is situated. In the north east side there is a pool for the use of priests. Outside the temple complex, in the western side is the Keezhthrikkovil Maha Vishnu Temple. There is large lake in the west, which is named Polachira. The Polachira lake was once belonged to the Kaviyoor Temple, but it is now under the control of Fisheries department, and an inland fish-seed farm functions here.

== Legends ==
There is hallow of a wide range of legends surrounding the temple. The Main legend is about the origin of this great temple. According to this legend the main Idol of Lord Shiva was installed by Lord Sri Rama in the presence of Sita, Hanuman, Sugreeva and Vibheeshana on his return to Ayodhya after defeating Ravana. Lord Sri Rama initiated Hanuman to bring a divine Sivalimga from Himalayas. Hanuman went to Himalayas and searched everywhere for a unique Sivalinga, and took some time for that purpose. As the auspicious time for prathishta neared, Lord Rama decided to do the Prathishta at once and using the earth form that place, he molded a Sivalinga and consecrated it. When he returned Hanuman became very sad seeing the prathishta was already done. So Lord Rama told Hanuman to remove the prathishta and install the Divyalinga he brought in its place. Hanuman tried his maximum, but the newly molded earthen Linga remained as such. Instead, the land surrounding it moved up to form a small hillock. So Hanuman prayed pardon, and sought Lord Rama for permission to stay near the Divya Prathishta done by him for ever. Thus Kaviyoor become Hanuman's place. It is traditionally known as the most prominent Hanuman temple in South India.

A second legend is about the installation of Hanuman prathishta inside the temple complex. Sage Vilwamangalam once visited this temple and on entering the compound he had a vision of Lord Hanuman sitting on the branch of the huge Ilanji (Mimusops elengi) tree in the north- eastern side of the outer courtyard. He prayed to the Lord to alight from the tree top and sit in a comfortable position in the inner courtyard, near to LordShiva. Hanuman sanctioned his wish and sat on the sage's Japa-Kindi in the north western corner of the inner courtyard. Later, as a result of a dream appeared to Maharaja Chithira Thirunal Balarama Varma a separate sanctum was built for Lord Hanuman in M.E. 1108( AD 1934).

== Deities ==
The Main deity is known as Thrikkaviyoorappan. The Shivalinga is believed to be made of sand and darbha grass. According to the dhyanasloka (concept) Lord Shiva of Kaviyoor Temple is in a pleasant form and is sitting in lotus position (padmasana) embracing Goddess Parvati with his left hand, and also surrounded by his sons Ganapathi and Subrahmanya. The idols of Shiva as Dakshinamurthi and Ganapathi are installed together in the southern side of the main sanctum. Lord Ayyappan is installed at the south-west, facing east In the west Goddess Parvati is worshiped as Sreemoolarajeswari. This idol was consecrated in ME 1068 (AD 1893) as per the orders of Maharaja Sri Moolam Thirunal Rama Varma of Travancore. Outside the main sanctum in the north-west corner of the inner courtyard is the position of the Hanuman temple. The idol is small and faces east. This deity has more popularity than Lord Shiva.

Outside the nalambalam (cloister) on the north- east side of the outer courtyard idols Serpent gods (Naga Raja and Naga Yakshi) are installed. The Deity of the Keezhthrikkovil Temple, situated beneath the main temple complex in the north- west side is Mahavishnu. Idol of this temple is made of stone, and is in standing position with four hands.

== History ==
Though according to the main legend, this temple belongs to Treta Yuga, its actual time of construction is not known. But architectural styles represent the early stages of Kerala temple architecture. The basement of the sanctum sanctorum belongs to the early 10th century or older. Several prominent historians share this opinion, saying that the presence of two 10th-century inscriptions surely certifies this It is believed to have been constructed in the early years of the 10th century.

One of the inscriptions is of Kali Era 4051( AD 951) and the second one belongs to Kali Era 4052(AD952). The first inscription is about a donation of acres of land to Lord Shiva of Kaviyoor by Makilancheri Thevan Chennan. The Second inscription describes a land donation by two persons named Magalathu Naryanan Keyavan and Mangalathu Narayanan Kittiran. The total lands donated according to these inscriptions are believed to be equal to 202 acres and was spread over the areas of Kidangara, Kottenkari, Kumarankari and Eera- places several kilometers away from Kaviyoor. These inscriptions are among the oldest inscriptions found in Kerala and bear huge historical importance. Kaviyoor was one of the 64 Brahmin villages in the Parasurama's Kerala 32 Thulu villages and 32 Malayalam villages. The Kaviyoor Mahadevar Temple was the Gramakshethra (village temple) of Kaviyoor Gramam. The temple was administered by ten Brahmin families known as Pathillathil potties and was taken over by the Travancore State Government in the year 1899 (ME 1075). As per records The Kaviyoor Temple takeover had added a huge wealth to the Travancore treasury since the take-over of more than 2500 temples in the ME 976 (about 100 before the accession of Kaviyoor temple), by Col. Monroe. The Take over/ accession of ME 976 has yielded more than 1,600,000 paras of paddy and almost 50,000 rupees money to the Travancore Treasury (at that time the Travancore King has accessed several major temples of Travancore state including the famous Temples of Kanyakumari, Sucheendram, Thiruvattar, Varkala, Harippad, Ampalappuzha, Thiruvalla, Chengannur, Aranmula, Ettumanoor & Vaikom) while Kaviyoor Temple's annual revenue was 9201 para paddy and 23,334.75fanams(Madras fanam). The Kaviyoor Temple was accessed to the Travancore State as the 12th First class Major Temple with its enormous wealth, including tens of thousands of acres of fertile lands, tens of thousands of rupees and the huge collection of worthy treasures.

== Architecture ==
Kaviyoor Mahadevar Temples is one of the oldest structural temples in Kerala. The temple with its copper-covered roof, golden flag mast and the wide steps at the eastern entrance, is one of the most beautiful temples in Kerala. This temple displayes perfect architecture. The Sanctum is circular with a diameter of 46 feet. The ancient basement is of five parts and bears peculiarities of the earlier period of temple architecture. The roof of the sanctum is cooper covered with a gilded dome. The outer wall of the sanctum is adorned with wooden sculpture panels. There are fourteen panels around and each are with carved stories from Ramayana, Mahabharatha, Bhagavatham and Sivapuranam. There are two large panels inside the mukhamandapam just above the sopanam on either side of the main door. Prodosha Thandava in the south and Trivikramamoorthy in the right. 44 rafters support the roof and the rafter shoes are made of bronze with reliefs of gods.

Namaskaramandapa, in front of the sanctum is square shaped. The inner roof of the Namaskaramandapam is full of beautiful carvings. Navagraha sculptures in the centre and the story of ramayana, from Rama's birth to Hanuman's Lankadahana is arranges here in three layers. The rafter shoes of the Mandapa was also bronze covered, but these 36 pieces are missing now. The inner roof of Vathilmadam (Koothumaadam) and Balickalppura are also abundant with sculptures. Due to the height and small size of sculptures, those on the Vathilmadam are not visible clearly. The Balickalpura sculptures include some poses from Kamasastra too. These sculptures belongs to late sixteenth or early seventeenth century. The wood work of this temple was done by local sculptors of the Thekkethil family.

The temple has a huge collection of precious ornaments which also shows the artistic excellence of the sculptors of Kaviyoor. These include Swarna prabhamandalam, golden Nettippattams and ezhunnallippu chatams, golden pots, golden reliefs of deities, golden umbrellas, golden chains and several materials with precious gems.

== Festivals ==
According to the revised pathiv (business) of Kaviyoor temple, there were 16 attaviseshams (annual festivals). But as of now the main annual festivals are Panthrantukalabham in Chingam Kanni (July), Ayilyam (September), Thiruvuthsavam (annual festival- December–January), Hanumath Jayanthy (December–January), Uthrittathi Attathirunal (January), Sivarathri( February–March), Kalabhaabhishekam (April) and Sahsrakalasam (May–June).

Panthrantu Kalabham was started in 1951 for Lord Hanuman as wished by Sri Chithira Thirunal Balaramavarma, in memory of the renovation and upgrading of the Hanuman Temple. The festival starts on the first day of Malayalam month Chingam and ends on the twelfth day. The Ayilyam in maylayalam month kanni is for the serpent gods.

The main festival of Lord Mahadeva is in the Malayalam month of Dhanu( December- January) attracts thousands of devotees from all over the central Travancore region and is of ten-day duration. The idol of the lord is taken atop caparisoned elephant to various places which are related to the temple from the second day to the sixth day of the festival. From the seventh day onward the rituals are held only inside the temple premises. On the tenth day, the Idols of Lord Shiva and Goddess Parvathi are taken in a grant procession to the Manimala river for Arat.

There is another annual festival in Malayalam month Dhanu (December–January) related to the Hanuman temple, called HanumathJyanthi. This festival also attracts thousands of devotees. In the month of Makaram (January–February) Uthrittathi thirunal is celebrated in memory of the consecration of the Sri Moolarajeswary idol. In Malayalam month Kumbham (February–March) Shivarathri is celebrated with various rituals. The 8000 lamps on the wall of the Nalambalam are lighted by seven regions of Kaviyoor and Kunnamthanam villages. Sahasrakalasam is a festival with high importance. This 11 day was started in ME1082 (AD1907).

== Offering ==
The main offerings for Lord Shiva are Dhara, Payasam, Atimakitaththal and Thulabharam. The main offering to Hanuman at this temple are Aval Panthirunazhi and Vadamala. Both these offerings needs advance booking, but small packets of aval nivedyam is available from the counter any time. For Mahavishnu main offering is palppayasam. Other common offerings like Ganapati Homan and other Hindu rituals are also offered in this Temple.

== See also ==
- Temples of Kerala
- Pathanamthitta District
- anikkattilammakshethram
