= Upper Bagh Devi Temple =

- Location in Odisha

Religion
- Affiliation: Hinduism
- District: Ganjam district
- Deity: Bagh Devi (Byaghra Devi)

Location
- Location: Kulada, near Bhanjanagar
- State: Odisha
- Country: India
- Coordinates: 19.969332°N 84.623862°E

Website
- maauparabagdevi.com

Upper Bagh Devi Temple (also known as Maa Upara Bag Devi Temple or Byaghra Devi Temple) is a shrine to the Hindu goddess Bagh Devi (Byaghra Devi), a form of Shakti, at Kulada in Ganjam district, Odisha, India. It is one of the most revered Shakti shrines of southern Odisha.

== Temple ==
A shrine of Bagh Devi has been built at the foot of the hill, near the road, to provide easier access for pilgrims who find the climb difficult. In the vicinity of the temple, several other shrines have been established, including temples dedicated to Jagannath, Mausimaa, and Ratneswar Mahadev.

=== Legend ===
According to local tradition, Bagh Devi had two sisters — the eldest known as Bada Raula and the youngest simply as Bagh Devi. The three sisters are said to have quarrelled over coconuts and decided to divide the surrounding region among themselves by throwing three lota (rounded drinking vessels) in different directions. One lota landed where the Bada Raula temple now stands; the second came to rest at the present site of the Upper Bagh Devi Temple; and the third fell into a pond, where a temple is said to exist below ground level.

According to another version of the legend, the 17th-century Odia poet Upendra Bhanja was instructed in a dream by Bagh Devis to build temples at all three locations. He subsequently built shrines for Bada Raula and Upper Bagh Devi, though the third temple for the youngest sister reportedly could not be completed.

== Bhanja Sanskruti (Bhanja cultural heritage) ==
Kulada holds a place of deep importance in the cultural history of Odisha as the birthplace of Upendra Bhanja (c. 1670–1740), celebrated as Kabi Samrat (Emperor of Poets) and one of the greatest literary figures of the Odia language.

The term Bhanja Sanskruti refers to the literary, musical, and cultural legacy of the Bhanja dynasty — and in particular of Upendra Bhanja — which is deeply intertwined with the sacred landscape of Kulada. The Bhanja rulers had a long association with the area; tradition holds that a 12th-century Bhanja king allied with a tribal chieftain named Kula to resist foreign invasion, and the settlement was subsequently named Kulad or Kullargad after him, with the ruins of an old fort still visible in the area.
