= Anantasaayi Vishnu Temple =

Coordinates: 21.471392°N 83.962501°E

The Anantasaayi Vishnu temple is located in Sambalpur. It is famous for the black chlorite image of resting Vishnu.

== Architecture ==
The temple was built in early sixteenth century by the Chauhan king, Balaram Dev. The main temple is of Rekha deula. Several images of Ganesha, Garuda and Avatars of Narayana are depicted in the temple architecture. It is said that the queen brought this image of Narayana in dowry and the king built temple in honour of the deity.

== Transport ==
It is situated within two kilometres of Sambalpur railway station, in Kamali Bazar near Bada Bazar.

== Festivals ==
All festivals related to Vishnu are celebrated here. Most important is Ananta Chaturdashi falling on Bhadrapada.
