= Harihara Deula =

Coordinates: 20.875234°N 84.205334°E

Religion
- Affiliation: Hinduism
- District: Boudh district
- Deity: Lord Shiva and Lord Vishnu

Location
- Location: Bank of Mahanadi river, at Gandharadi village
- State: Odisha
- Country: India
- Interactive map of Harihara Deula

The Harihara Deula or Twin Temples are dedicated to Shiva and Vishnu near the bank of the Mahanadi Riverr at Gandharadi village in Boudh district of Odisha, India. They are protected as a monument of national importance by the Archaeological Survey of India.

The Vishnu Temple has a Vigraha made of black chlorite and has four hands having all weapons and ornaments.
