= Brahma Temple, Bramha Karmali =

Temple in Goa, India

Coordinates: 15°34′10″N 74°09′46″E

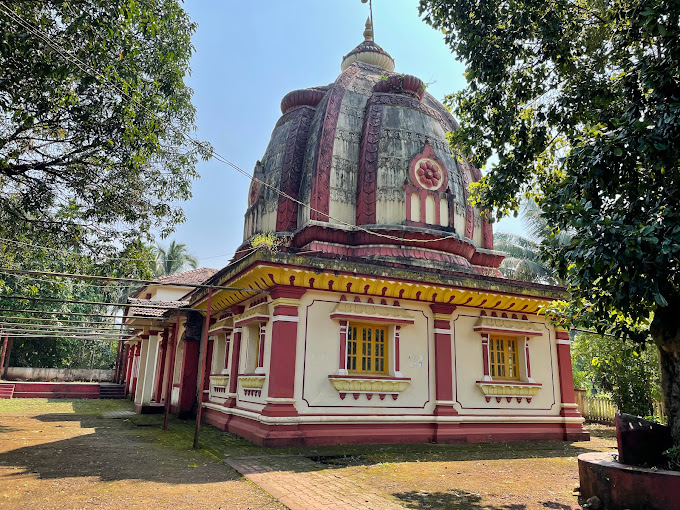

Brahma Temple, Bramha Karmali, Goa (also known as Shri Brahmadav ji Temple) is located in the village of Nagargao, Valpoi, Goa, India. It is one of the few dedicated to Lord Brahma in India. The temple houses a 12th-century black stone idol, carved during the Kadamba period. This sculpture depicts Brahma in his Trimurti form, symbolizing the trinity of Brahma, Vishnu, and Mahesh, with Brahma portrayed with a distinctive beard. The idol's craftsmanship and historical significance make it an important yet often overlooked aspect of Goa's cultural and religious landscape.

== History ==
The history of the Brahma Temple in Nagargao, Valpoi, dates back to the Kadamba period, around the 12th century. During this time, the Kadamba dynasty, which ruled parts of Goa and Karnataka, contributed significantly to the region's cultural and religious landscape, constructing temples and supporting the arts. The temple, dedicated to Lord Brahma, is a rare example of Brahma worship, as very few temples in India honor him. Despite Brahma's role in the Hindu trinity, with Vishnu and Shiva, temples dedicated to him are scarce due to various legends, including one that Brahma was only meant to have one temple in Pushkar, Rajasthan. The black stone idol at Nagargao, carved in this era, reflects the artistic expertise of the period and stands as a testament to the religious diversity of Goa during the Kadamba rule. Over time, the temple has maintained its historical significance, though it remains lesser-known compared to other Goan temples.
