= Narasimha Temple, Puri =

Coordinates: 19.817503°N 85.840000°E

Narasimha Temple

Religion
- Affiliation: Hinduism
- District: Puri
- Deity: Lord Narasimha

Location
- Location: Puri
- State: Odisha
- Country: India
- Interactive map of Narasimha Temple

Narasimha Temple (Odia: Narasinha Deuḷa) is situated in Puri, Odisha, India, to the western side of Gundicha Temple and to the east of the Indradyumna tank.

== Architecture ==
The temple is facing towards west and the height of the temple is about 60 ft. Local people also called this temple as Nrusingha Temple and Nrusimha Temple. The presiding deity is Lord Narasimha. There are two images of Lord Narasimha inside the temple, one behind the other. The image in front is called Shanta Narasimha. In local language 'Shanta' means 'Calm' or 'Sober'. Anyone who sees this image of Lord Narasimha will have his anger, frustration, and anxiety will vanish. The Deity in the back is called Ugra Narasimha. In local language 'Ugra' means 'Angry'. He is the internal mood of Narasimha.

== Legend ==
As depicted in the Skanda Purana once King Indradyumna stayed near Nilakantheswar temple to make arrangements to perform Ashwamedha Yajna for one thousand years. On the advice of Sage Narada, King Indradyumna made a Nrusimha image out of black stone and placed the image under black sandal wood tree and worshipped Him. It is believed that in front of this temple the Ashwamedha Yajna took place and hence He is known as 'Yajna Narasimha'. Devotees will earn more punya if they make a darsana of Sri Nilakantheswar, Yajna Narasimha and Panchamukhi Hanuman (Lord Hanuman image with five faced) after the sacred bath in Indradyumna Tank. Festivals like Narasimha Janma, Satapuri Amavasya etc. are observed in Nrusingha temple with great devotion.

== History ==
When Kalapahad attacked Puri and was smashing Deities of various temples, he saw Shaanta Narasimha image and his anger subsided; hence he could not break the Deity as he had planned. Santa Narasimha’s features are human-like. He has a sharp human nose, a large curly mustache, and an outstretched tongue. Non-Hindus are not permitted in the temple, but the Deities are visible from the door.

== Parshwadevatas ==
As per Pancharatra and Vaikhanasa the central idol of Vishnu should be surrounded by four side icons, whether be it Purusha, Satya, Achyuta, Aniruddha (Vaikhanasa) or Vasudeva, Samkarshana, Pradyumna, Aniruddha (Pancharatra). Here also similar pattern is followed where the main deity Nrisimha faces west direction, and other deities are surrounded as follows.

The three sides central niches of the side of Vimana house the images of Varaha, Trivikrama(Vamana) and Vishnu as the Parsvadevatas of the main presiding deity. The image of Varaha is the Parsvadevata of the southern side. He holds Chakra in his uplifted back right upper hand while his lower left hand holds a conch above Goddess Prithvi. The Parsvadevata on the northern side niche is Trivikrama. The four handed image of Trivikrama has been installed on the double petalled lotus pedestal. He holds gada in right upper hand, lotus flower in right lower hand, chakra in left upper hand and conch in left lower hand respectively. Figures of Sridevi and Bhudevi are flanked on either side of deity. The right leg of deity is set firmly on the ground and another uplifted left foot touches the image of Brahma. Beneath his uplifted leg is a scene of Bali who is presenting the gift to Vamana while Shukracharya lifts his hands up in dismay. The image of four handed Vishnu is the Parsvadevata of the eastern or backside central niche of the main deity. The central deity is the Ugra Nrisimha inside the Garbhagriha and Shanta Nrisimha facing west is the first expansion of the Ugra Nrisimha. Finally the five images equate as per the traditional Vaishnava Agama shastra.
