= Nedumala Caves, Piralimattam =

Caves in Kerala state, India

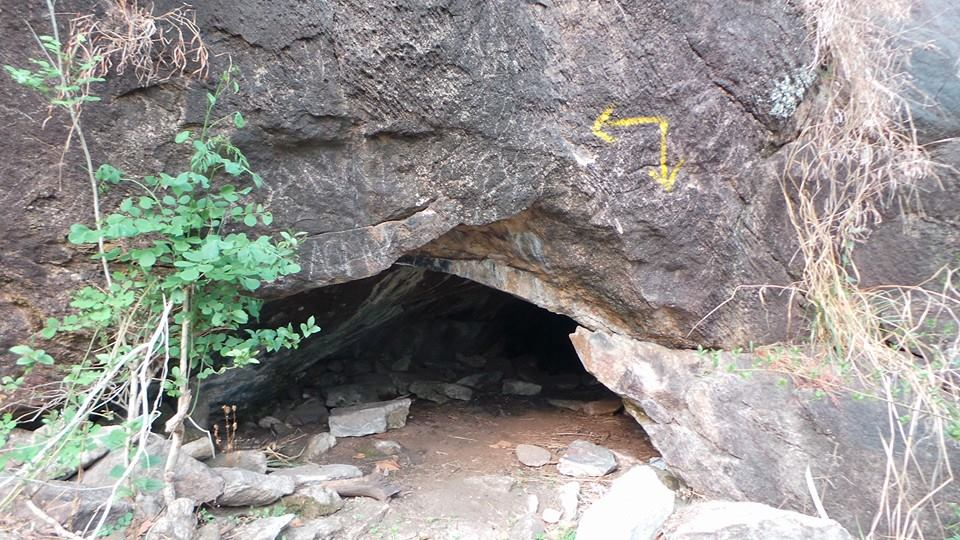
cave entrance

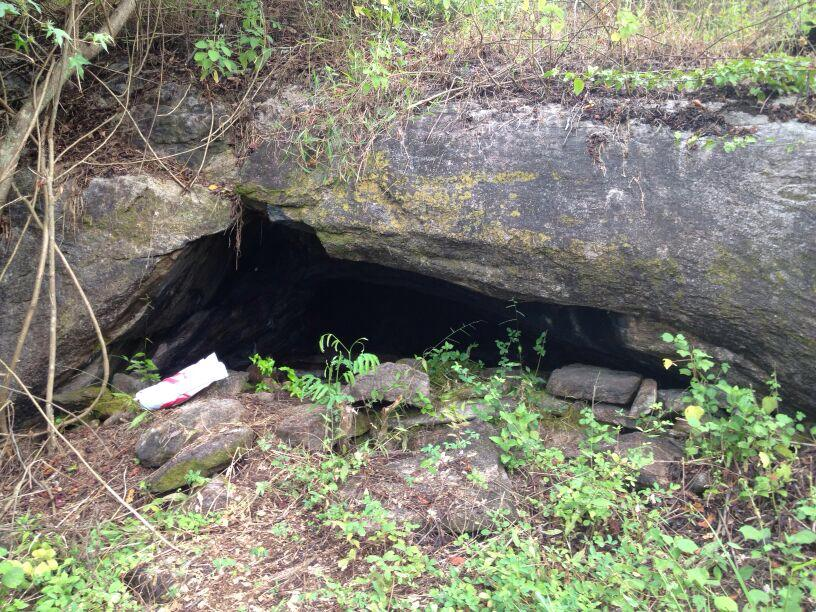
cave entrance

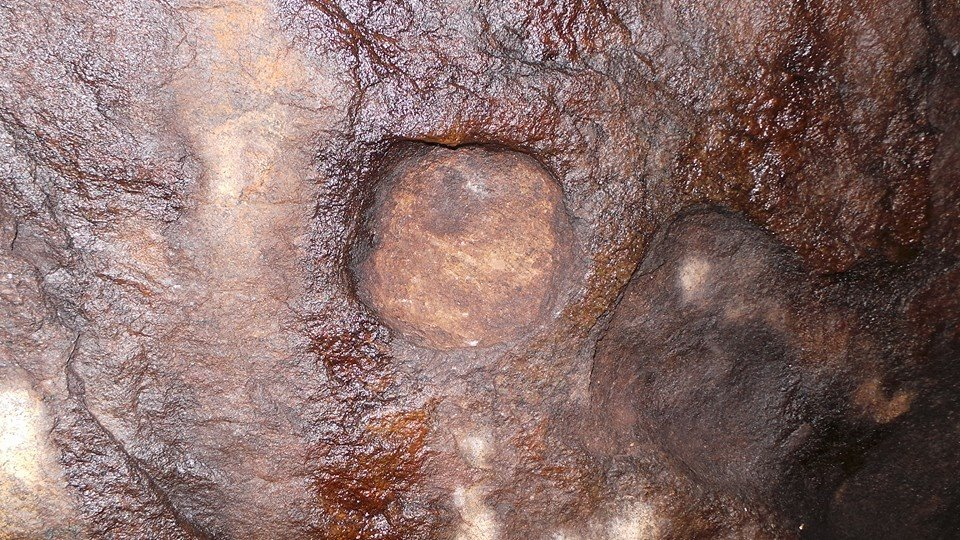
Cupules in cave piralimattam nedumala

The Nedumala Caves are in Piralimattam, on the border of Idukki district and Ernakulam District in the Indian state of Kerala. Piralimattom Nedumala hills is a prehistoric site. Caves feature carvings on granite rock and stone shelter. According to archaeologist P. Rajendran, UGC Research Scientist, the caves may date to the Neolithic period around 4000 BC.

Three caves discovered at Piralimattam in Nedumala have elaborate petroglyphs in cupules and shallow grinding surface. Many concave cupules and grinding surfaces are visible, both completed and incomplete.

== Prehistoric rock-shelter (Muniyara) ==
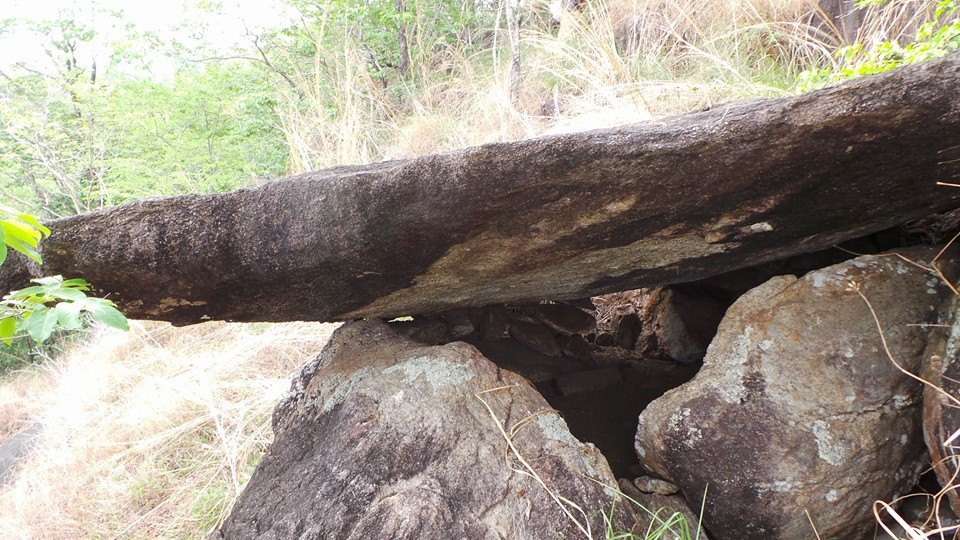
Prehistoric stone shelter

A man-made shelter of the prehistoric past features a single rock slab 4 meters in length, 2 m in width and .5 m thick rests on two rock out-crops of 1.5 m height. Its opening is on the eastern side. The shelter can accommodate two or three people. The shelter has no characteristics of a Dolmen or Muniyara of the Megalithic culture.

== Location ==
Piralimattam nedumala is in Manjalloor panchayath of Ernakulam district, Kerala. It is 3 km from Kadalikkadu and 5 km from Vazhakulam.
