= Brahma Temple, Niali =

Coordinates: 20.140153°N 86.062801°E

The Brahma Temple is a Hindu temple of creator God Brahma is located at the north-eastern side of the Niali village in Cuttack district of Odisha, India. It is very near to Madhava Temple, Niali. Some local Brahmins opine that an Ashwamedha yajna was done by Brahma here.

The present temple was rebuilt during the 12th century. The central icon of Brahma holds a rosary and Kamandalu, sitting on a Lotus. He has four faces. This icon is assigned to the time of Shailodbhava dynasty of Utkal during 7th century AD. There are two Vishnu images which belong to 12th century AD. The main vimana is of Pidha deula style.

A tributary of Mahanadi called Prachee is flowing near the shrine.
