= Sana Caves =

Buddhist caves in Shana Vankiya, India

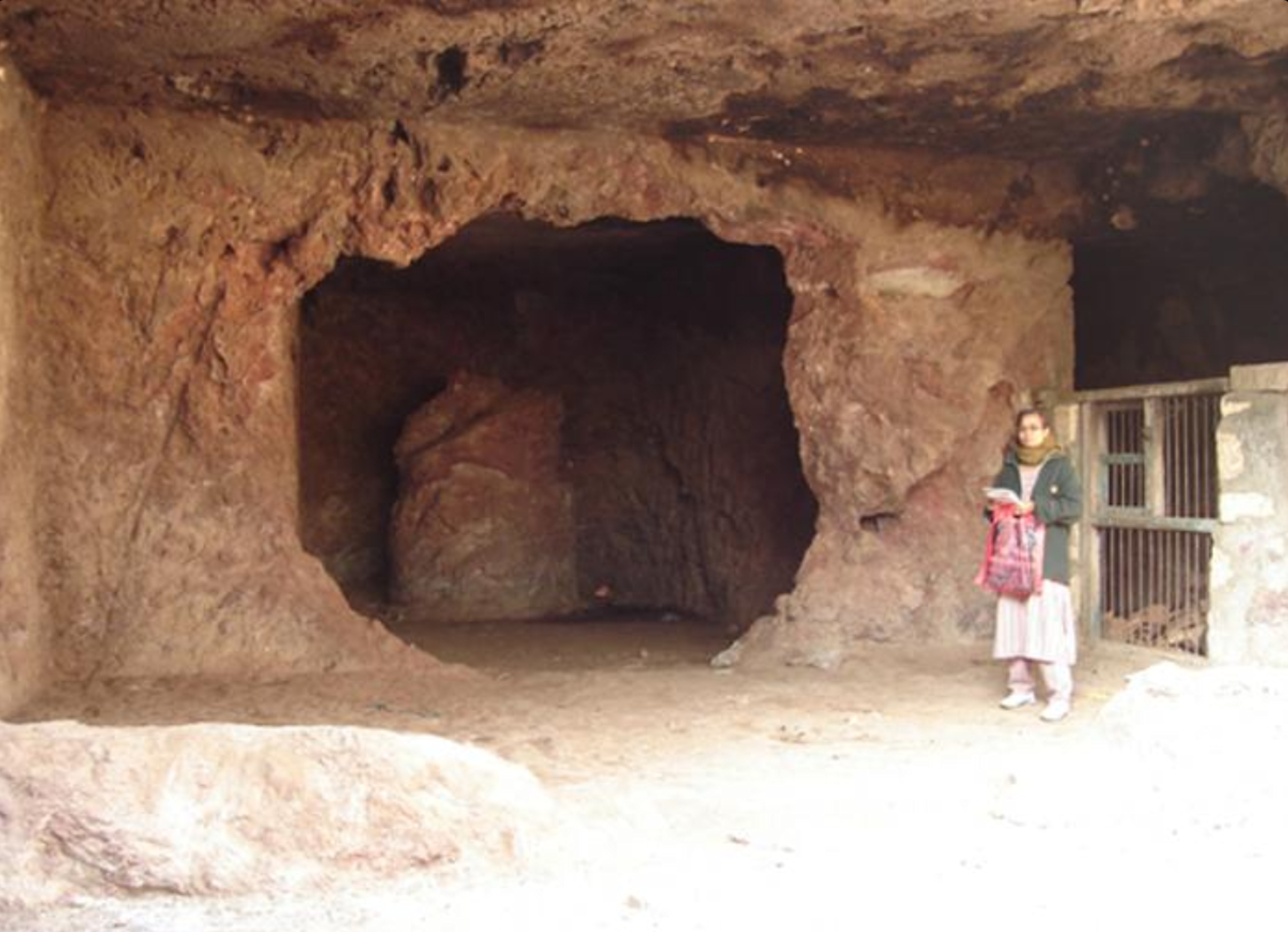
- Sana Caves

- Location within India Location within Gujarat
- Location: Gir Somnath, Gujarat
- Coordinates: 20.9624188°N 71.2023475°E

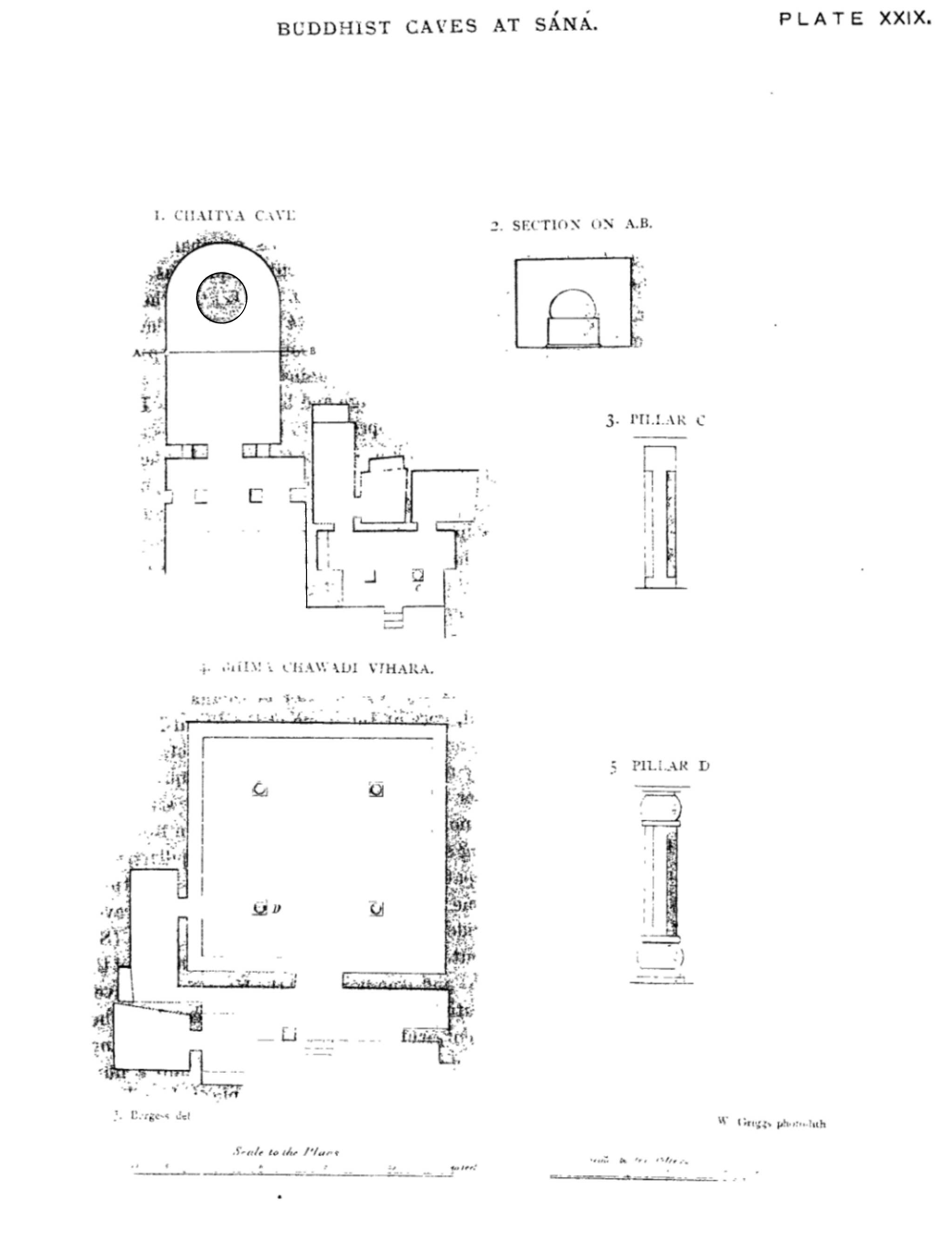
Plan, section and drawings of pillars of Sana caves (Chaitya Cave and Bhima Chauri Vihara)

There are two sets of Buddhist caves in two different places taking the name of Shana (or Sana) caves.

The Shana Dungar Buddhist Caves or simply called as Sana Buddhist Caves are located in Shana Vankiya in Una Taluka, Gir Somnath district of Gujarat, bordering with jafrabad Taluka of Amreli district. Vankiya is located which is located 28 km far, north-easterly to Una town, about 38km south-easterly to Tulsishyam and 35km west of Rajula.

There is another set of Sana Buddhist Caves near Somnath Temple in Veraval. These caves are simply called as Prabhas Patan Buddhist caves, and not so much as Sana caves. Nonetheless, information about these caves has gotten mixed up in the media. Sana Caves of Prabhas Patan are located 2 km north-east of Somnath temple. Do not confuse the caves in Prabhas Patan with the majestic Shana Dungar Buddhist Caves at Vankiya, which are located about 105 km far, easterly from this place.

== Architecture of Shana Dungar Buddhist Caves, Una Taluk ==
The rock cut carving includes 62 caves spread over the hill consisting stupas, chaityas, pillows and benches. The halls of few caves are dome-shaped and pillared. According to historians, the construction of caves had started by the 2nd century BC in Western India. Other historians have claimed that the architecture was constructed around the 1st century CE. A few historians have claimed that it is hard to trace the date of the caves' architecture.

Sana Caves of Junagadh is a group of about 62 rock shelters which were carved out of soft rock. These caves were created in the period ranging between 1st century BC and 1st century AD and provided shelter to monks looking for refuge during the monsoons. Sana Caves are undoubtedly the oldest Buddhist caves in western India and boasts of rock cut pillars, stupas, benches, chaityas, viharas, a pillared hall and various domes. The shelters have been carved at various levels on and around a hillock. Some of the best archaeological symbols representing the preaching Buddhism can be seen at Sana Caves.

The largest cave, Cave 2, is named Bhima-ni-Cori and is considered to be similar to Ebhala- Mandapa, which is located at Talaja. This cave is approximately 21 meters in depth and has a width of 18.3 meters. The ceiling is 5.3 meters high and provides ample space to tourists wishing to walk through them. It also has six pillars which are located between the pilasters in front. One of the pillars depicts unique features of a concave neck between the drum and the dome.

Cave 26 and Cave 13 are different from the others. They have long verandahs with simple pillars resting on raised basements. These function as a support system for the beams above. The monasteries are also exquisitely designed with pillared verandahs which usually contain up to 4 cells at the back. The presence of benches around the hall is also an important feature of these caves.

The layout of Cave 48 is very different from the rest. It contains two halls of different dimensions. These halls contain benches around their perimeter. Most of the caves were carved at different heights and levels in the spur and could be approached by simple stairs cut into the rock. The presence of multiple tanks in this group of caves bears evidence to the importance given to water harvesting. With rock cut walls present on three sides and an oblong mouth on the other, these tanks were perfect for retaining water during the bleaker seasons. This architectural design has also been noticed in the Kanheri caves near Mumbai in Maharashtra.

These caves are distinctive for their simplistic designs. Featuring a noticeable absence of engravings and ornate carvings—which are present in most of the other Buddhist caves in Gujarat. The caves contain three chaitya grihas, which possess apsidal walls and flat ceilings. A walk through Sana Caves takes you to viharas, which refers to pillared verandahs containing one or two cells. These cells containing rock cut benches inside them, most likely used for resting, sitting or taking shelter during the rains. The Sana Caves are a focal point of interest for scholars, researchers and students looking for deeper insights into the art forms and architectural designs of the Buddhist period, and known by tourists for providing a retreat to those wishing to enjoy the topographical landscapes beyond.

== History ==
Footprints of Buddhism in Gujarat can be traced back to 270 BC. This was the period when Ashoka the Great ruled Saurashtra and was striving to spread the teachings and philosophy of Gautam Buddha across his empire. The ideology of Buddhism started gaining roots in various places in Gujarat, including Junagadh, Somnath, Velavar and the mouth of the River Indus—along with a host of other far flung areas in the state. The accounts written by Chinese scholars and travelers of the likes of Hiuen Tsiang and I-Tsing bear testimony to the spread of Buddhism in these parts of the world.

Buddhism started spreading across the nation and Gujarat in particular between the periods 27 B.C. to 470 A.D. Various archaeological remains and historical facts point to the development of embellishments and shelters in and around the areas of Somnath and Vadnagar. Sana Caves was the most prominent amongst them. These caves were located in the precincts of the Sana Hill, which is located 25 km north-east of Una and witnessed the rise and fall of a once flourishing monastery. With several water tanks and shelters to their credit, Sana Caves were constructed on the three slopes of an elevated plateau sloping down to the waters of River Rupen on the western face of the elevation.

== Architecture of Shana Buddhist caves of Prabhas Patan ==
Buddhist caves of Prabhas Patan are simple in design and only two in number. These two caves are believed to a part of Buddhist vihara from the 3rd and 4th century AD. Each is about 8.7 m x 9.45 m, and 2.5 m high with four square pillars. An opening connects them at the rear. The eastern cave has an antechamber. Except for a row of niches on the outside there is no ornamentation. Buddhism, under Kshatrapa patronage was prevalent in the region during the early centuries of the Christian era.
