= Madhava Temple =

Temple in Odisha, India

Coordinates: 20.1403°N 86.0608°E

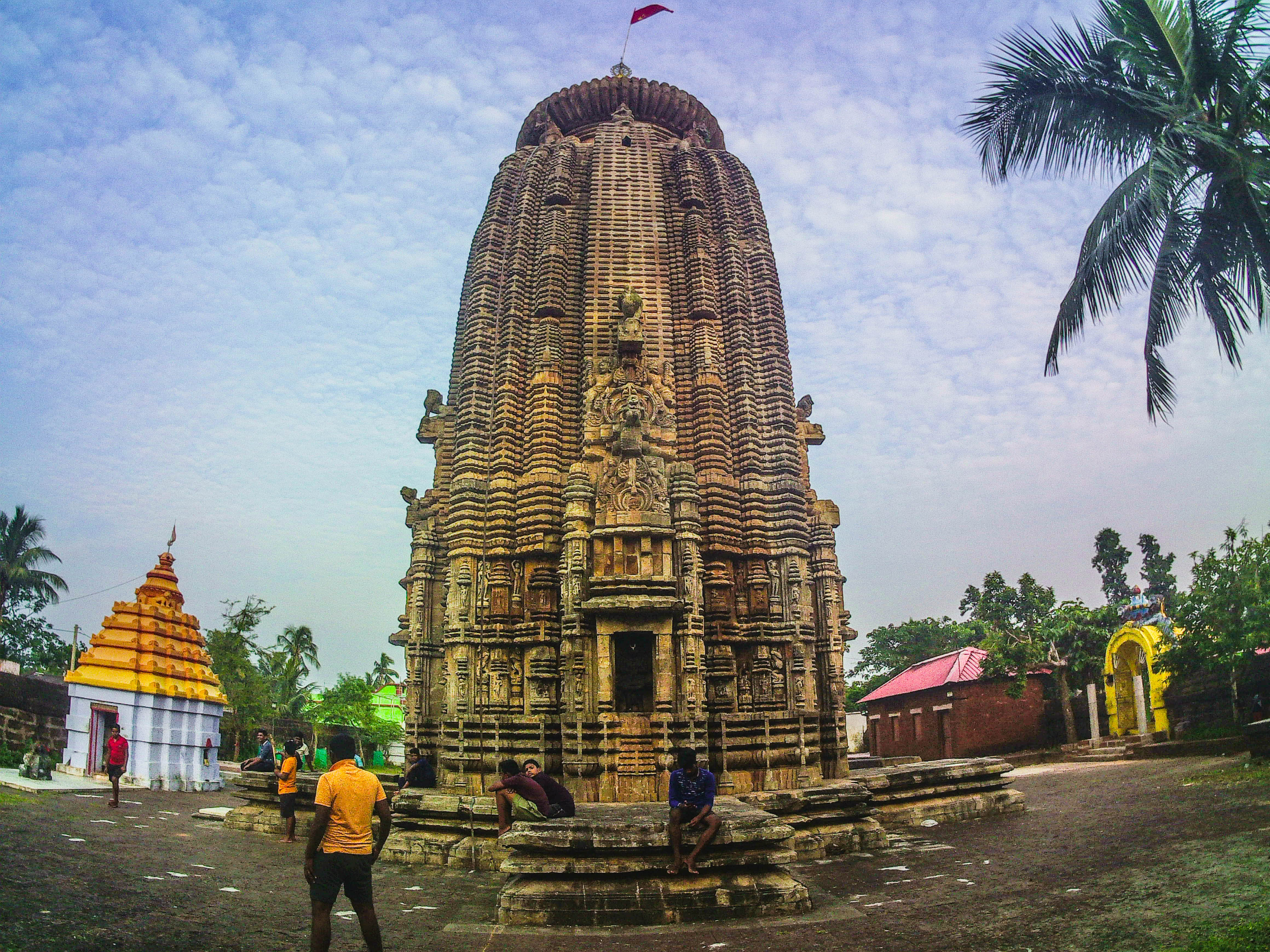
Madhab Temple at Niali built by Ananga Bhima Deva III in 13th Century AD.

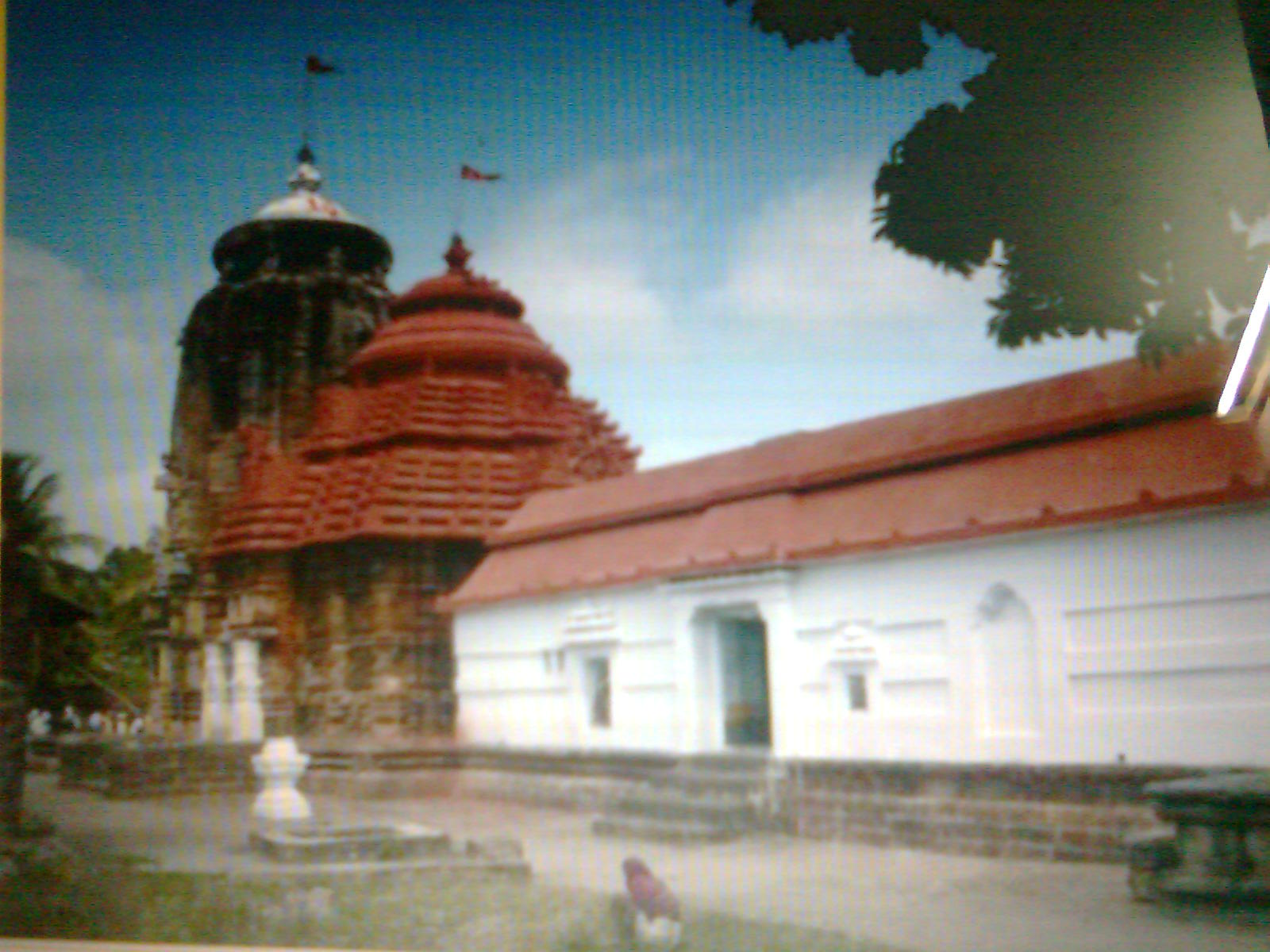
Madhab temple at Niali

Madhava Temple, (Sanskrit:माधव देवालय ), (Odia:ମାଧବ ଦେଉଳ) is the temple to Vishnu at Madhab village of Niali block in Cuttack district, Odisha, India.

== See also ==
- Nilamadhav Temple
