= Kedareswar Temple =

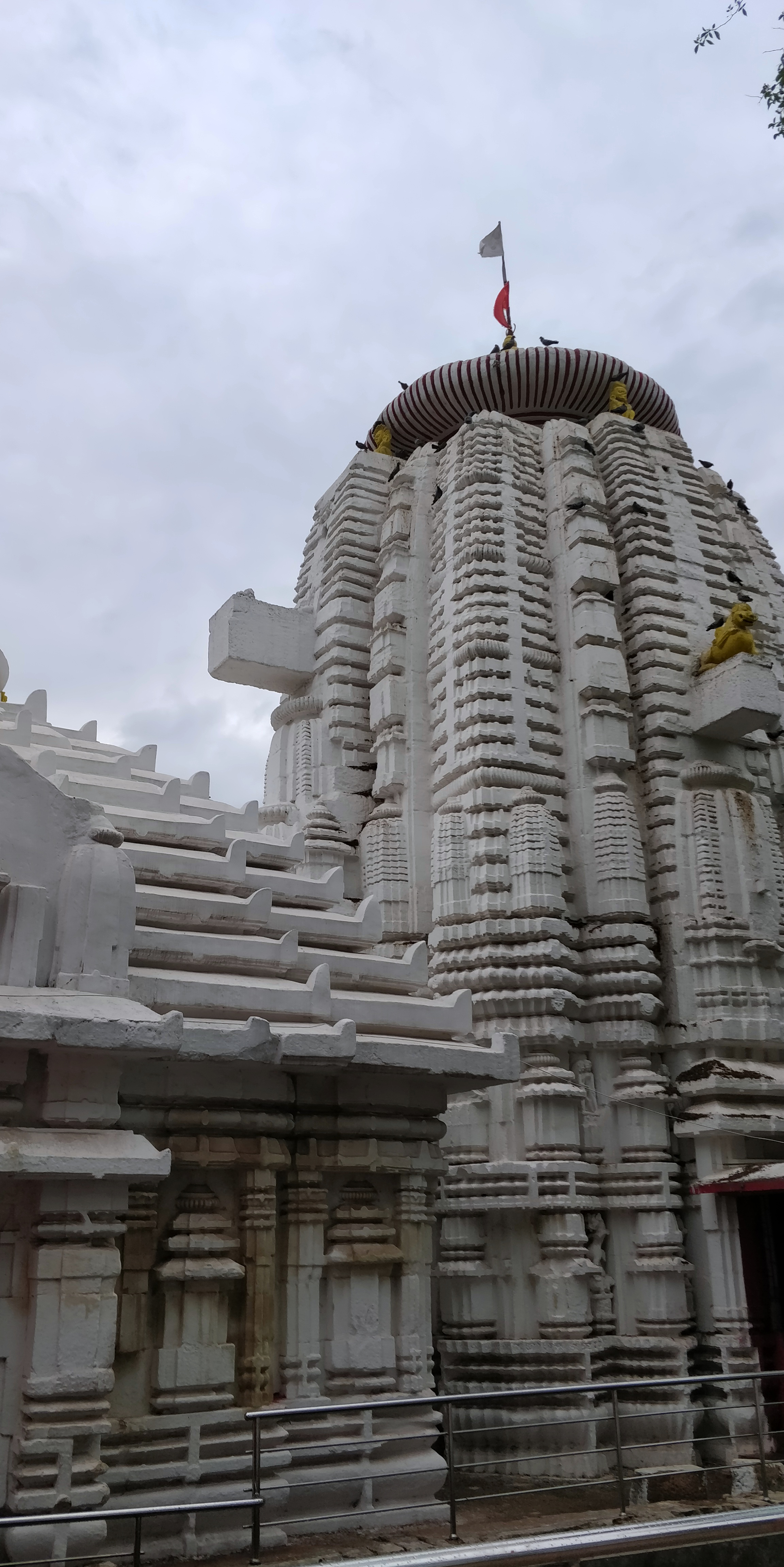
- Kedareswara Deula

Religion
- Affiliation: Hinduism
- District: Bhubaneswar
- Deity: Lord (Shiva)

Location
- Location: Mukteswar Temple
- State: Odisha
- Country: India
- Coordinates: 20°14′32″N 85°50′25″E

Kedareswar Temple, one of the eight Astasambhu Temples, is near the Mukteswar Temple, in Bhubaneswar, Odisha. The presiding deity is Shiva, referred to locally by the name ‘Kedareshwar’. It is in the precinct of Kedara-Gouri on the right side of the road leading to Puri from Bhubaneswar and at a distance of 40 metres south of Muktesvara. It is one of the ten monuments within the precinct. It is the main temple of the complex. The temple is facing south and the enshrined deity is a circular yonipitha made of sandstone. The linga at the centre is missing. The sanctum is 2.5 square meters which is 0.8 meters below the present ground. It stands near the yard of the Mukteswar Temple.

== Legend ==
There lived a couple named Kedar (male) and Gouri (female). They loved each other and decided to marry. The society was against the union, so it led them to flee from village. During the journey Gouri felt hungry, so Kedar went for food and was killed by a tiger. Later Gouri hearing this at this place jumped into the pond. The king of Utkal, Lalatendu Keshari, knowing this raised a temple named Kedareshawr or Kedargouri Temple. Still lovers come here to pray for a happy wedlock without any obstacles. The pond here is said to have some medicinal property.

== Surrounding ==
The temple is surrounded by Dutiya Kedaresvara on its west at a distance of 500 meters, Kedara kunda on its east at a distance of 0.50 meters, Gouri temple on its southern at a distance of 6.00 meters and compound wall on its northern side at a distance of 20.00 metres.

== Architectural features ==
On plan, the temple has a vimana and jagamohana measuring 20.40 metres in length and 9.60 metres in width, with the ganthiala measuring 0.60 metres. While the vimana measures 9.60 square metres, the jagamohana measures 10.80 metres in length and 9.60 meters in width. The temple is pancharatha. On elevation, the vimana is in rekha order that measures 13.50 metres in height from pabhaga to kalasa.. With fivefold divisions of the bada, the temple has a panchanga-bada measuring 5.40 meters. At the bottom the pabhaga has five base mouldings khura, kumbha, patta, kani and basanta that measures 1.24 meters. Tala jangha measures 1.18 metres, bandhana 0.50 metres, upara jangha 1.18 metres and baranda 1.30 metres in height. The bada of the temple is decorated with beautiful sculptural embellishments. The gandi measures 5.30 metres. The mastaka is composed of usual beki, amlaka, khapuri, kalasa, and ayudha that measures 3.00 metres. The sanctum measuring 2.50 square metres is 0.70 metres below the present ground level. On elevation, the jagamohana is in pidha order. With threefold divisions of the bada, pabhaga has five base mouldings of khura, kumbha, patta, kani and basanta, measuring 1.20 metres, jangha 1.55 meters and baranda 0.75 meters. The bada is relived with niches surmounted by pidha mundis. The gandi of the jagamohana is set with eleven receding tires measuring 4.00 meters in height. Mastaka consisting of beki, ghanta, amlaka, khapuri, kalasa and ayudha measures 3 meters.

=== Raha niche and parsvadevatas ===
The raha niches in the talajangha on three sides uniformly measure 1.20 metres in height x 0.72 metres in width with a depth of 0.35 metres. Below the niche is the talagarbhika, which is decorated with khakahra mundis being flanked by a pairs of naga and nagini pilasters with the serpents coiling in ascending order. The large raha niches enshrine the parsvadevatas. A two-recess moulding surmounts the raha niche and above the recess, there is a large rekha angasikhara, which is surmounted by an udyota lion, from the udyata lion to the bisama the entire gandi portion is decorated with plain tiers. Above the raha paga in the beki deulacharini support the large amlaka of the mastaka
