= Narayana Gosain Temple =

Coordinates: 20.816467°N 86.133338°E

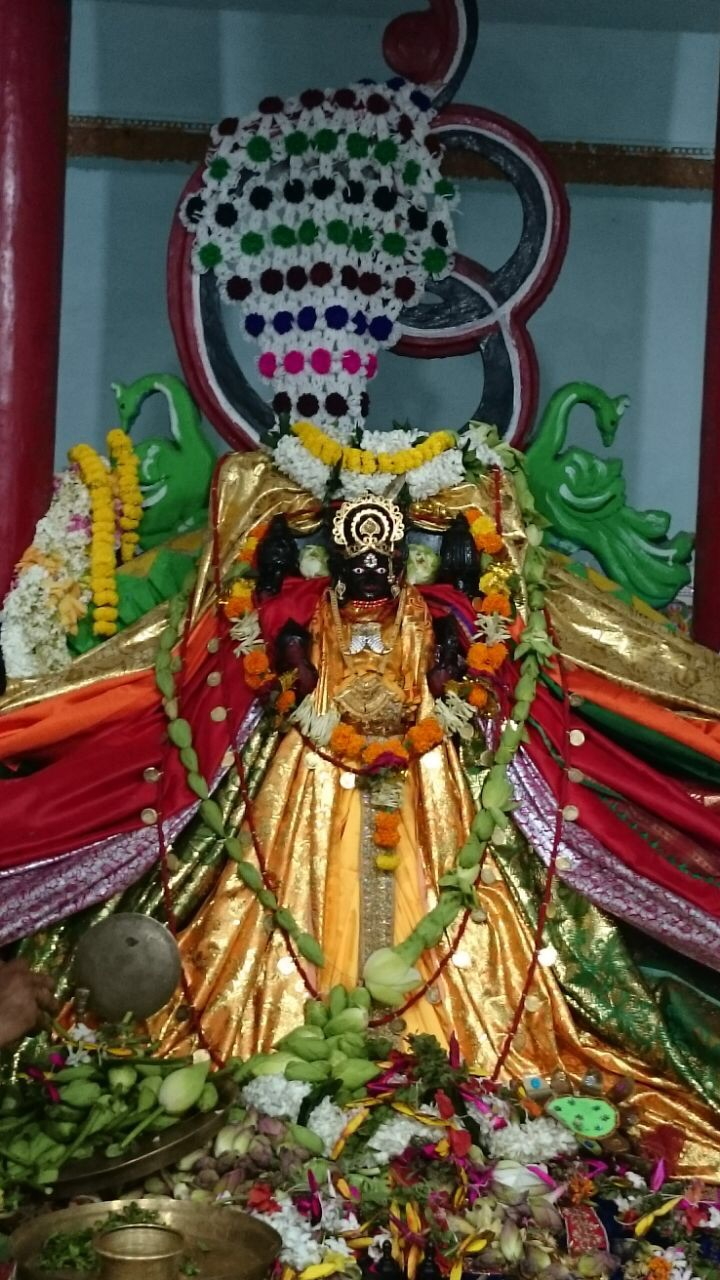
- Principal deity at Narayan temple, Jajpur

Religion
- Affiliation: Hinduism
- District: Jajpur district
- Deity: God Vishnu

Location
- Location: Singhapur Village in Jajpur district
- State: Odisha
- Country: India

Narayan Gosain Temple is a Hindu temple situated at Singhapur Village in Jajpur district of Odisha, India which is dedicated to the god Vishnu (Narayana Gosain).

== History ==
As per a legend, a Muslim invader(Kalapahad)after destroying numerous temples and Hindu images, reached the region in the 16th century. The then King of Madhupurgarh, hid the central image in the pond to save the idol from Kalapahad.

A few years later, Vishnu appeared to the King and asked him to take the image out of the pond and worship and then to be kept back safely. This happened during Mahavisuva Sankranti or Pana Sankranti period. Since then annually, the image is taken out of the pond on the Pana Sankranti day and worshipped for three days.

== Rituals ==
The icon of Narayana Gosain is kept underwater in a pond near the temple, Madhutirtha Kshetra, except for three days in a year. People gather on these three days to catch a glimpse. This annual ceremony is known as Singhapur yatra. This has been a practice here for more than four centuries.

According to the tradition, first the King of Madhupurgarh comes and offers prayers to the Lord on the bank of the pond as Narayan Gosain is the presiding deity of the king. After the King’s puja and prayer, thousands of devotees take part in the ceremony every year.

Since the Raja Birbar Krishna Prakash Dhir Narendra Singh had no son, he had made a public announcement near the pond that, in future, his elder heir and daughter, the Queen of Madhupurgarh, Rani Aparna Dhir Singh will offer the seva puja and pushpanjali to Narayana Gosain.The abhishek of Rani Aparna Dhir Singh was done in the presence of her younger sister Anusuya Dhir Singh and the only Rajmata of Madhupur Rani Deepti Devi in the presence of priests of Madhupurgarh palace temple.

== Transport ==
It is situated within 3 km from NH16 running between Chennai and Howrah. Nearest Railway Station is Jajpur Keonjhar Road or Vyasanagar.
