= Kaviyoor =

Kaviyoor Kaviyur
- Village
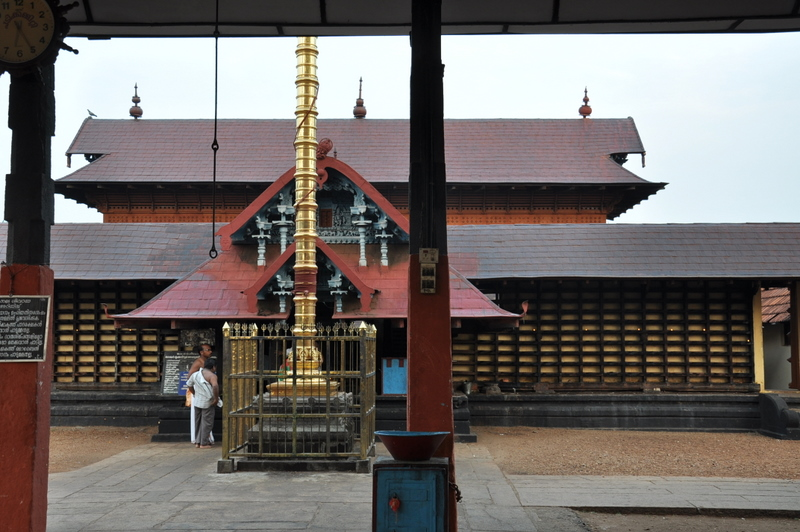
- Kaviyoor Temple, Main Entrance

- Kaviyoor (Kerala) Kaviyoor (India)
- Coordinates: 9°24′00.7″N 76°36′49.7″E
- Country: India
- State: Kerala
- District: Pathanamthitta
- Elevation: 55.33 m (181.5 ft)

Languages
  - Official: Malayalam, English
- Time zone: UTC+5:30 (IST)
- PIN: 689582
- Vehicle registration: KL-27 THIRUVALLA
- Coastline: 0 kilometres (0 mi)
- Climate: Tropical monsoon (Köppen)
- Avg. summer temperature: 35 °C (95 °F)
- Avg. winter temperature: 20 °C (68 °F)

Kaviyoor is a village located in Thiruvalla taluk in Pathanamthitta of Kerala in India, situated on the western bank of the Manimala River. It comes under Thiruvalla sub-district & Thiruvalla constituency.

== Demographics ==
- Area: 12.67 km^{2}
- Population Data: (According to the 2011 census)
- Total: 16,852 (increased by 3.32% from 2001)
- Male Population: 7,778 (46.15%)
- Female Population: 9,074 (53.85%)
- Population Density: 1,330 per square km
- Literacy: 98.27%, Male 98.64% (7,040), Female 97.96% (8,224)

(Note: These figures are based on statistics of Census Dept. The summary given by them is different: Literacy 98.27%, M - 98.64%, F - 97.96%)

Majority of the residents belong to the Hindu community. The total population is estimated to be about 16,852 people with a literacy rate of about 97%.

== See also ==
- Kaviyoor Mahadevar Temple
- Pathanamthitta
