= Simhanath Temple =

Coordinates: 20.370905°N 85.378533°E

Baba Singhanath Temple
- Bali Singhanath Peeth

Religion
- Affiliation: Hinduism
- District: Cuttack district
- Deity: Lord Shiva
- Festivals: Makara Mela in Makar Sankranti and Jagara Jatra in Shivaratri

Location
- Location: Gopinathpur village of Baramba Tehsil
- State: Odisha
- Country: India
- Interactive map of Baba Singhanath Temple

Architecture
- Style: Kalingan architecture
- Completed: 8th century

Singhanath Temple is dedicated to Shiva who is worshipped by Narasimha, an avatar of Vishnu. The temple has a rekha deula and terraced roof jagamohana of traditional phase of temple style of Kalingan order. The temple is unique for its sculptural embellishment of both the Saivaite and Vaishnava sects. It is located in the Gopinathpur village, Baramba tehsil of Cuttack district, Odisha, India. It can be easily approached by road from Cuttack, Athgarh and Banki by new Mahanadi bridge.

== Archaeology ==
The garbhagriha has a Shivalinga with yonipatta attached to earth. The temple is of Panchayatana style practised by Adi Shankara. Temples dedicated to Vishnu, Ganesh, Surya and Mahishamardini are found around the temple. The temple represents early development of Pancharatha Deula of Kalinga Architecture. On the basis of survey, the temple can be assigned to early 9th century AD.

== Festivals ==
Maha Shivratri, Makar Sankranti, Dussehra, Kartik Purnima are mostly famous festivals here. People who do Upanayana and Marriage also prefer this place as a nice option.
