= Lohani Caves =

Caves in Madhya Pradesh, India

Coordinates: 22.3481801°N 75.3922888°E

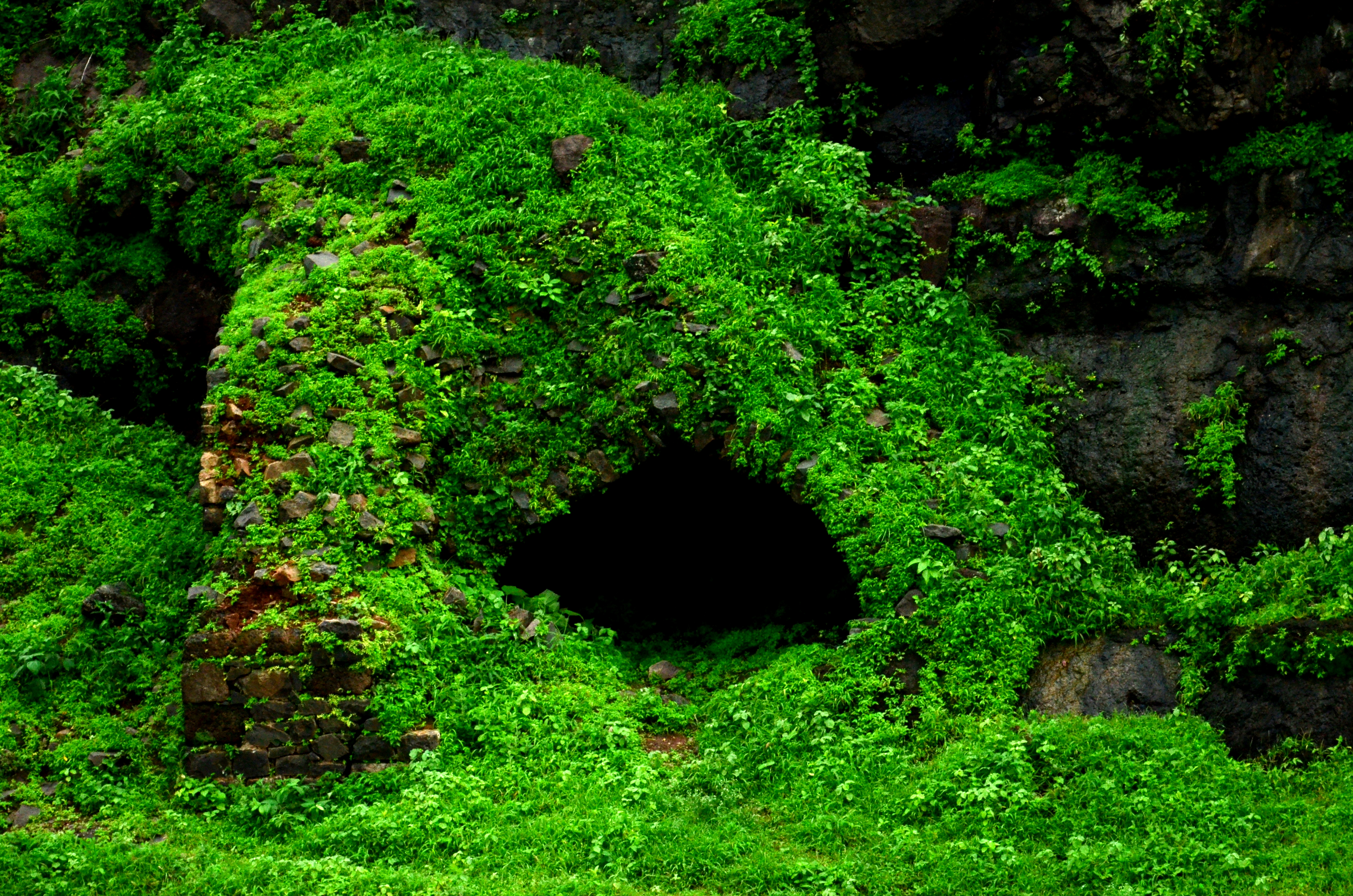

Lohani Caves are rock-cut caves and temples found near the abandoned Mandu site in southwest Madhya Pradesh, India. These excavations are dated to about the 11th and 12th century CE. The archaeological studies have yielded Hindu statues and carvings such as those of Shiva, Parvati, Vishnu and Lakshmi. These suggest that these were likely Hindu monasteries, probably belonging to the Shaivism tradition. It is near a group of Islamic monuments built after 13th century.

This cluster of Hindu and Muslim monuments in Mandu, Dhar is about 300 kilometres (190 mi) southwest of Bhopal and has been put in the tentative list of being a UNESCO world heritage site. It is listed on the Monuments of National Importance of India with code N-MP-90.
