= Kulada, Ganjam =

Kulada ଭଞ୍ଜ ଭୂମି
- Village
- Location in Odisha, India
- Coordinates: 19°58′26″N 84°37′41″E
- Country: India
- State: Odisha
- District: Ganjam

Government
  - Type: Democratic

Languages
  - Official: Odia
- Time zone: UTC+5:30 (IST)
- PIN: 761131
- Telephone code: 91

Kulada is a small village near Bhanjanagar of Ganjam district in Odisha. It is located 108 km towards North from District Headquarters Chhatrapur and 159 km from State capital Bhubaneswar. Asika, Hinjilicut, Phulabani, and Berhampur are the towns close to Kulada. Odia is the native language here.

== Geography ==
It is situated to the north west of Ganjam District with a ruin fort, river Mahanadi flowing in the east and dense forest in the west side of the ruined fort. Bhanjanagar, Brahmapur etc. are the nearest towns / cities to Kullada village. It is surrounded by Belaguntha Tehsil towards East, Surada Tehsil towards South.

== Demography ==
Legend speaks that during 12th century a Bhanja ruler had joined hands with a tribal leader KULA to be eradicating the foreign invasion. Seeing the danger from the tribe he stained the tribal leader KULA and on the same place, constructed a fort which was later known as Kulad / Kullargad. The original temple is at the top of the hill known as Upper Bagh Devi with 273 steps. Upendra Bhanja spent his term in meditation at this place.

== Transportation ==
There is no railway station at Kullada. Berhampur is the nearest railway station located 90 km from Berhampur.Daspalla Railway station is about 60 kilometers from kullada
