= Dahi (curd) =

Fermented milk product

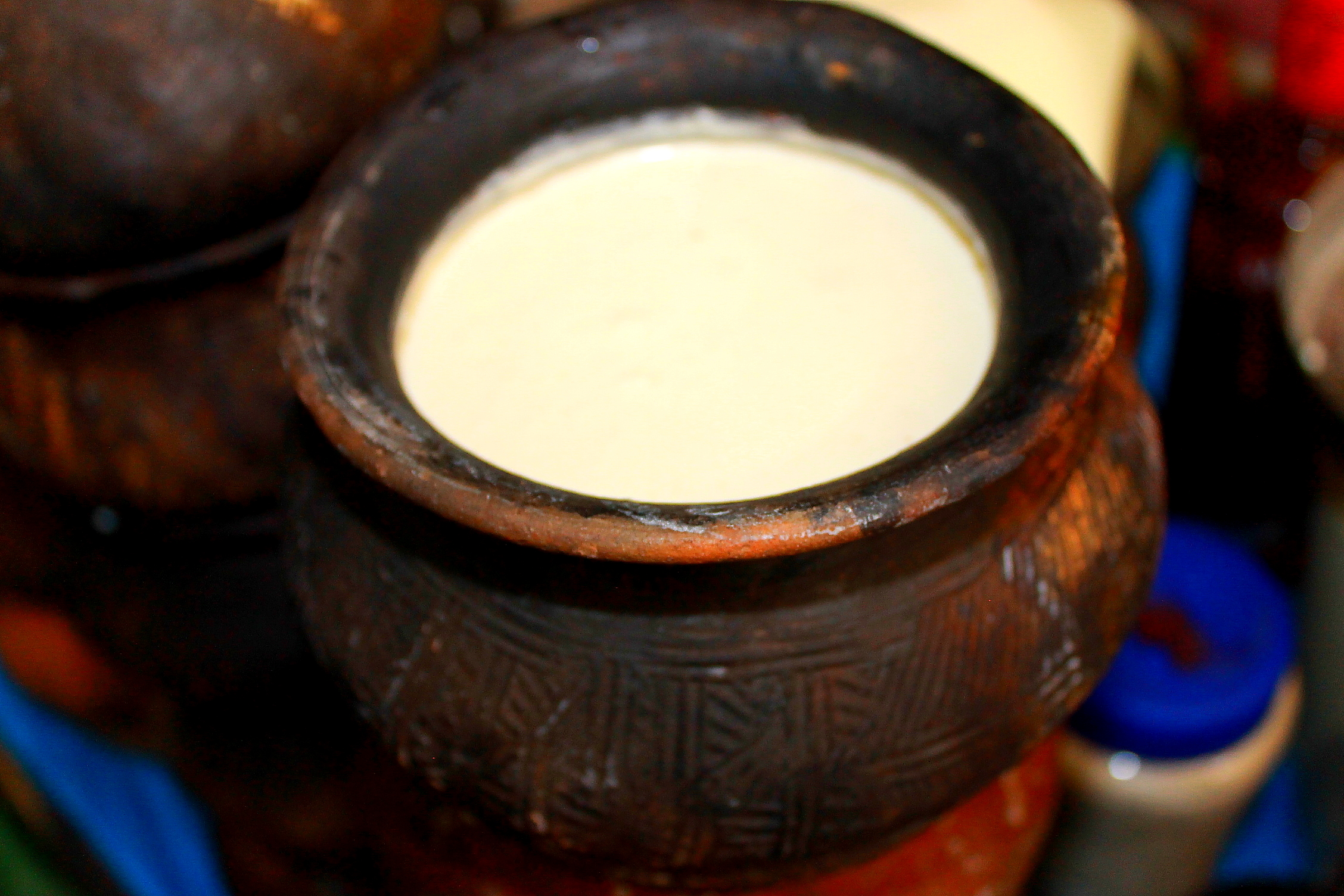
- Dahi in a traditional Manipuri earthen pot
- Alternative names: Curd, doi, mosaru, perugu, thayir, mee kiri
- Course: Homemade yogurt
- Place of origin: Indian subcontinent
- Region or state: South Asia
- Associated cuisine: Bangladesh, India, Nepal, Pakistan, Sri Lanka, Trinidad and Tobago, Guyana, Suriname, Mauritius, Fiji, South Africa
- Main ingredients: Milk, Lactobacillus culture
- Ingredients generally used: Sugar
- Variations: Mishti doi, Bogurar doi, Nabadwip-er lal doi, Dhau

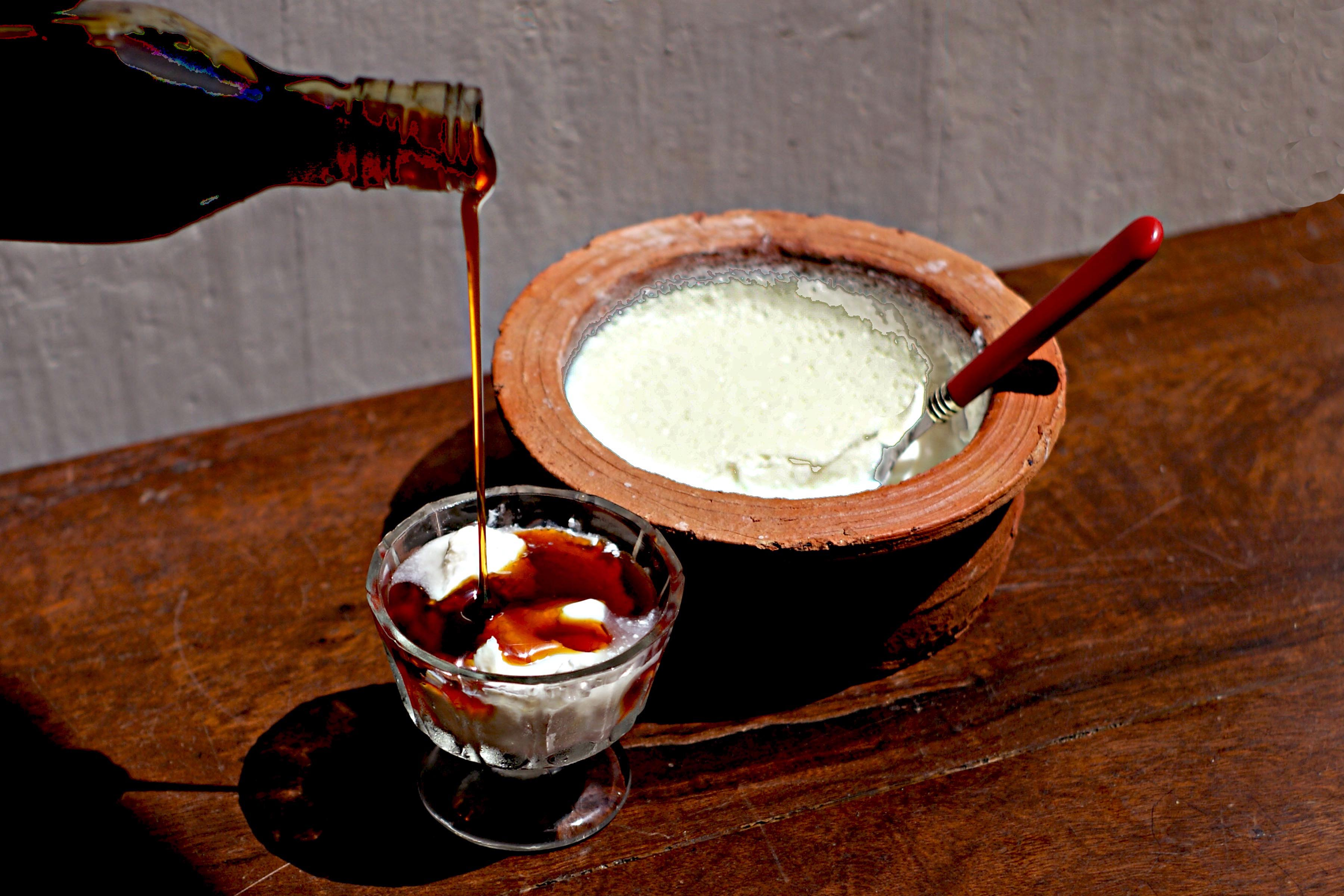
A cup of curd ready for dessert

Dahi (Note: doi, also mosaru, thayir and perugu. IPA: [d̪əɦiː, d̪ɔiː, mosɐru, t̪ɐjiɾ, peruɡu]) is a traditional yogurt or fermented milk product originating from and popular throughout the Indian subcontinent. It is usually prepared from cows' milk, and sometimes buffalo milk or goat milk. The word curd is used in Indian English to refer to homemade yogurt, while the term yogurt refers to the pasteurized commercial variety known as "heat-treated fermented milk".

== Preparation ==
Curd is made by bacterial fermentation of milk. In this process, lactose in milk is converted into lactic acid by several probiotic microorganisms. The species involved in the fermentation depends on the temperature and humidity of the environment and may include Lactococcus lactis, Streptococcus diacetylactis, Streptococcus cremoris, Lactobacillus delbrueckii subsp. bulgaricus and Streptococcus thermophilus.

Curd starter is sometimes made with dried red chillies (or their stems) in hot milk. Milk is boiled and then allowed to cool for a while. When tepid, dried chili peppers or their stems are added. The reason for this tradition is that dried chillies are rich in a type of lactobacilli, the bacteria which help ferment milk to form curd. The bowl is then kept undisturbed in a warm place for 5 to 10 hours.

After the starter is made, or saved from a previous batch of curd, milk is boiled and cooled. In a separate bowl, curd is mixed with its whey, and then mixed together with the milk. It is then left to sit undisturbed for 5 to 10 hours, until slightly sour, then refrigerated until consumption.

This practice can also be applied for making curd from milk substitutes, such as soy milk.

== Types ==
=== Buffalo curd ===
Buffalo curd (Sinhala: මුදවාපු මී කිරි mudavāpu meekiri) is a traditional type of yogurt prepared from water buffalo milk. It is popular throughout the Indian subcontinent. Buffalo milk is traditionally considered better for making yogurt than cow milk due to its higher fat content making a thicker yogurt mass. Buffalo curd is usually packaged in clay pots.

Buffalo curd is obtained by bacterial fermentation of buffalo milk. In this process, lactose in buffalo milk is converted into lactic acid using several micro-organisms. The species involved in the fermentation are the same as above.

Buffalo milk has higher amounts of protein, fat, lactose, minerals and vitamins than cow's milk. The quality of the curd depends on the starter culture. Fermentation also develops the characteristic flavor and color of the product.

Buffalo curd can be made in both traditional and industrial forms. Traditionally, buffalo milk is filtered and boiled, the scum is removed and it is cooled to room temperature. A few spoonfuls of a previous batch of curd are added and it is then mixed well and poured into clay pots. These are sealed by wrapping a piece of paper over the pot and allowing it to stand for 12 hours.

== Curd dishes ==
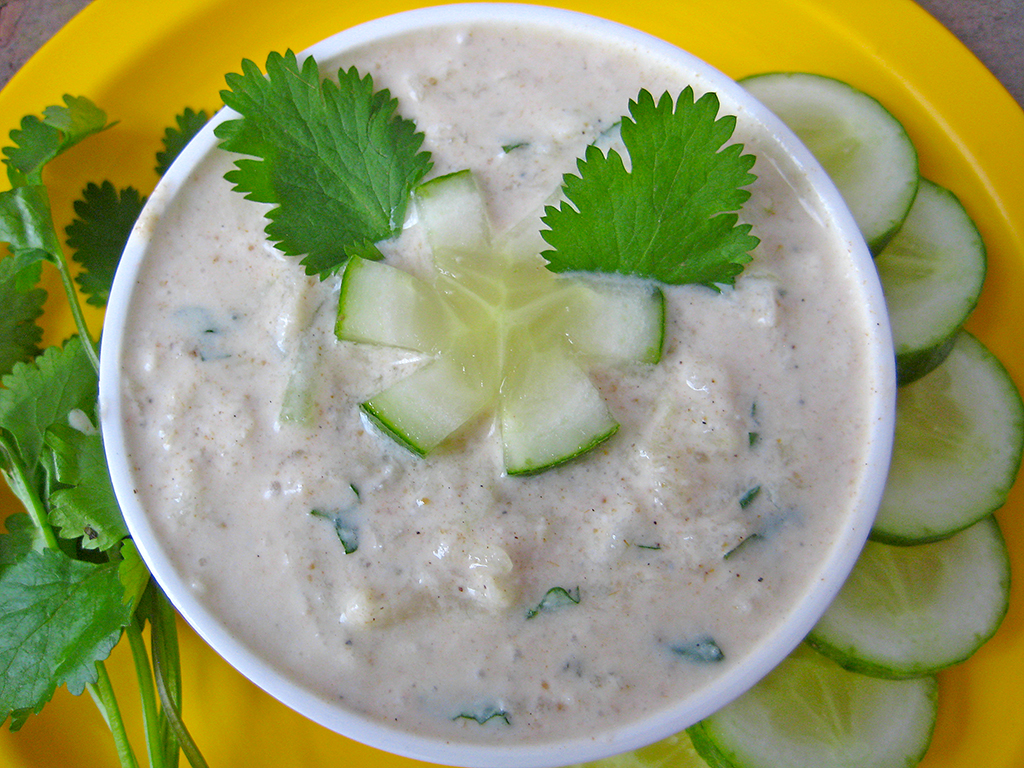
Raita is a popular side dish in the Indian cuisine.

Curd is an important part of everyday diet in the Indian subcontinent, both in slow cooked food and fast food.

Slow (cooked) food

- Curd rice
- Dahi kadhi – curd curry
- Doi maach – fish in curd curry, a Bengali dish
- Dahi baigan/Kathrikai thayir kothsu – Eggplant with curd, south Indian cuisine
- Kadhi bari – a curd curry popular in Northern India and Southern Nepal.
- Perugu Pachadi – a curd-based dip, an Andhra dish
- Thepla – served with plain curd, a Gujarati dish

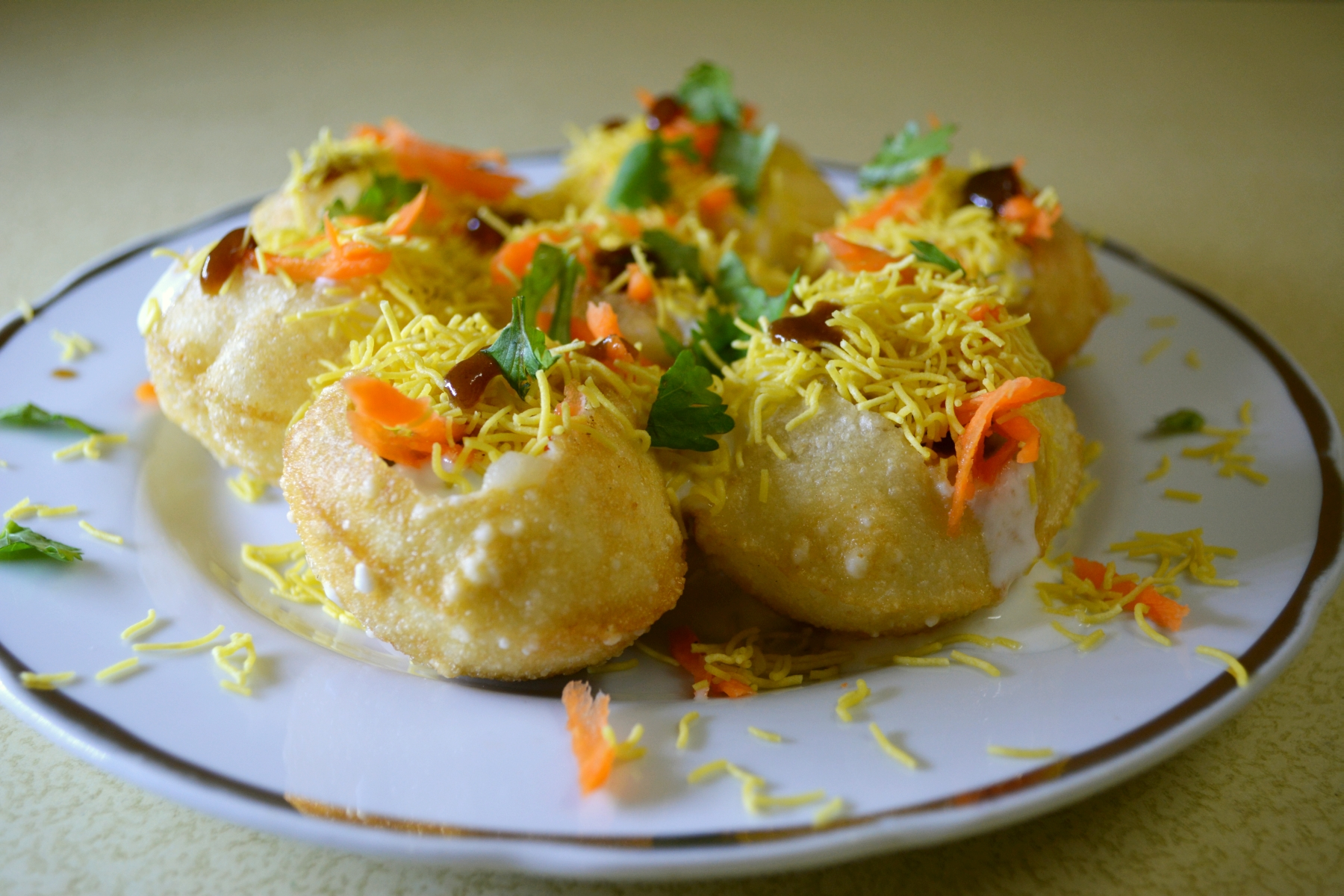
Dahi puri, a spin on the popular dish Panipuri

Fast food

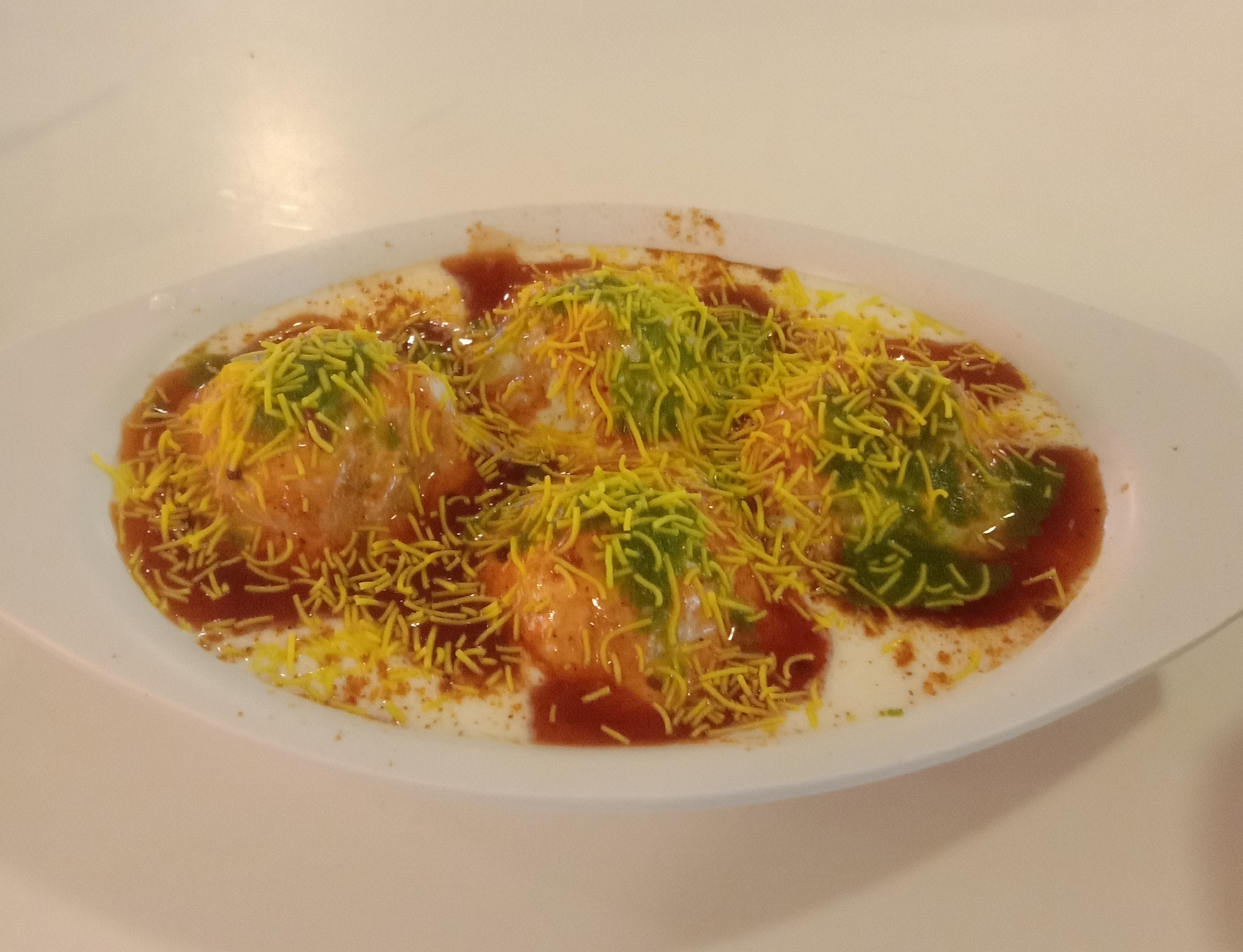
Dahi vada

- Dahi vada / Dahi bhalla – Vada soaked in curd
- Dahi chiura – curd mixed with chiura, sugar and/or seasonal fruits, a Nepalese/Bihari snack
- Lassi – curd mixed with water and sweetener, usually sugar or molasses. Another version is salty lassi.
- Chaas/Borhani - curd mixed with water and Sea salt, black salt or Himalayan salt. It is also known as buttermilk.
- Borhani - curd mixed with coriander and mint, a Bangladeshi drink
- Papri chaat
- Dahi puri – a variation of Panipuri, using curd instead of tamarind water
- Dahi bhelpuri – a variation of bhelpuri, with curd on top
- Aloo tikki – plain curd is a side dish for aloo tikki
- Aloo paratha – plain curd is a side dish for aloo paratha
- Mishti doi – curd that is fermented after adding sweetener to milk, usually cane jaggery or date palm jaggery, a Bengali dessert.
- Raita – a side dish for biryani
- Ghoḷa Dahi/Ghoḷa- a strong-to-mild ginger infused with ginger and pepper, a characteristic Odia drink.
- Chukauni – a Nepalese side dish made up of curd and potatoes with spices

== See also ==
- Curd rice
- Dadiah
- Dhau
