= Nabadwip-er lal doi =

Confectionery of the Bengal region

Red curd of Nabadwip
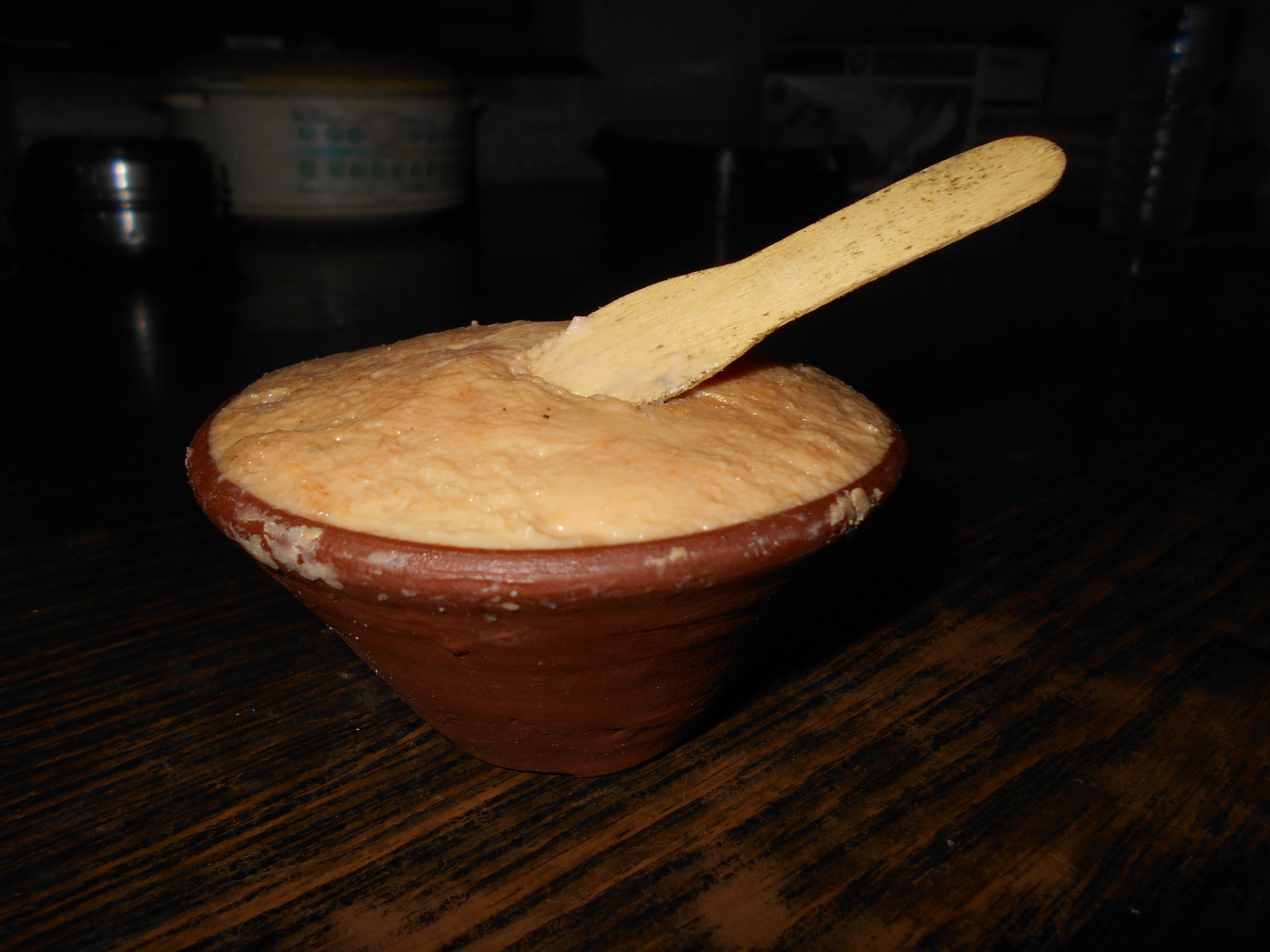
- The red doi of Nabadwip, West Bengal, India
- Alternative names: Kheer doi, Chakku doi
- Course: Dessert
- Place of origin: India
- Region or state: Nabadwip, West Bengal, India
- Associated cuisine: India
- Created by: Kalipada Modak
- Serving temperature: Cold
- Main ingredients: Milk
- Similar dishes: Mishti doi

Nabadwip-er lal doi (Bengali: নবদ্বীপের লাল দই transl. Red curd of Nabadwip), also known as Kheer doi or Chakku doi, is one of the most famous types of confectionery in the Bengal region of the Indian subcontinent, originating in present-day West Bengal, India. Though curd is usually white, red curd is a distinct type of confectionery. Red curd of the Nadia's Nabadwip type is very popular. Kali Ghosh or Kalipad Modak of Nabadwip was the inventor of the confectionery in 1930. One of the most famous red curd shop is "Laxmi Narayan Confectionery Store", that is 150-years old curd shop. After preparing the curd, it can be stored up to ten days.

== History ==
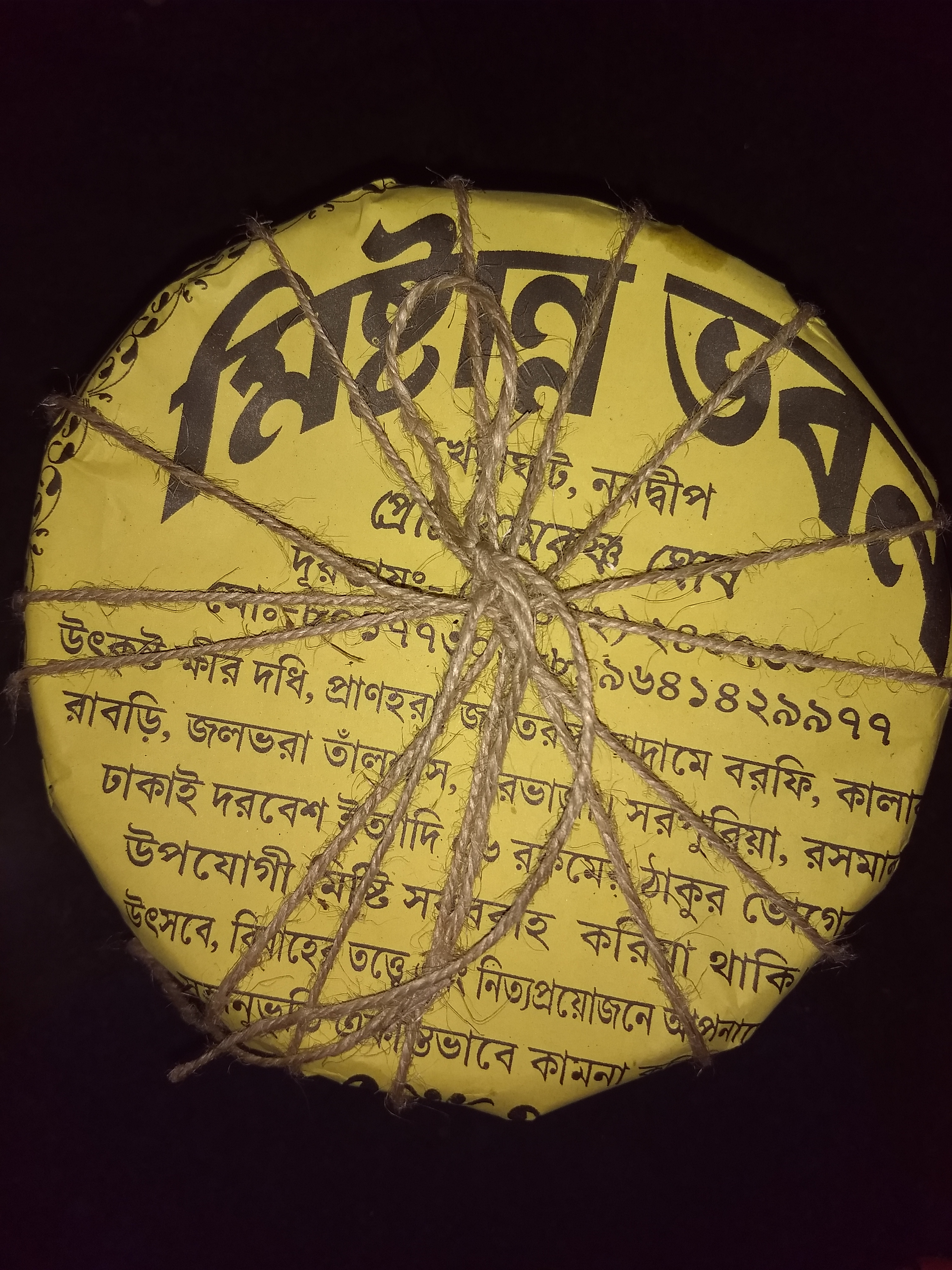
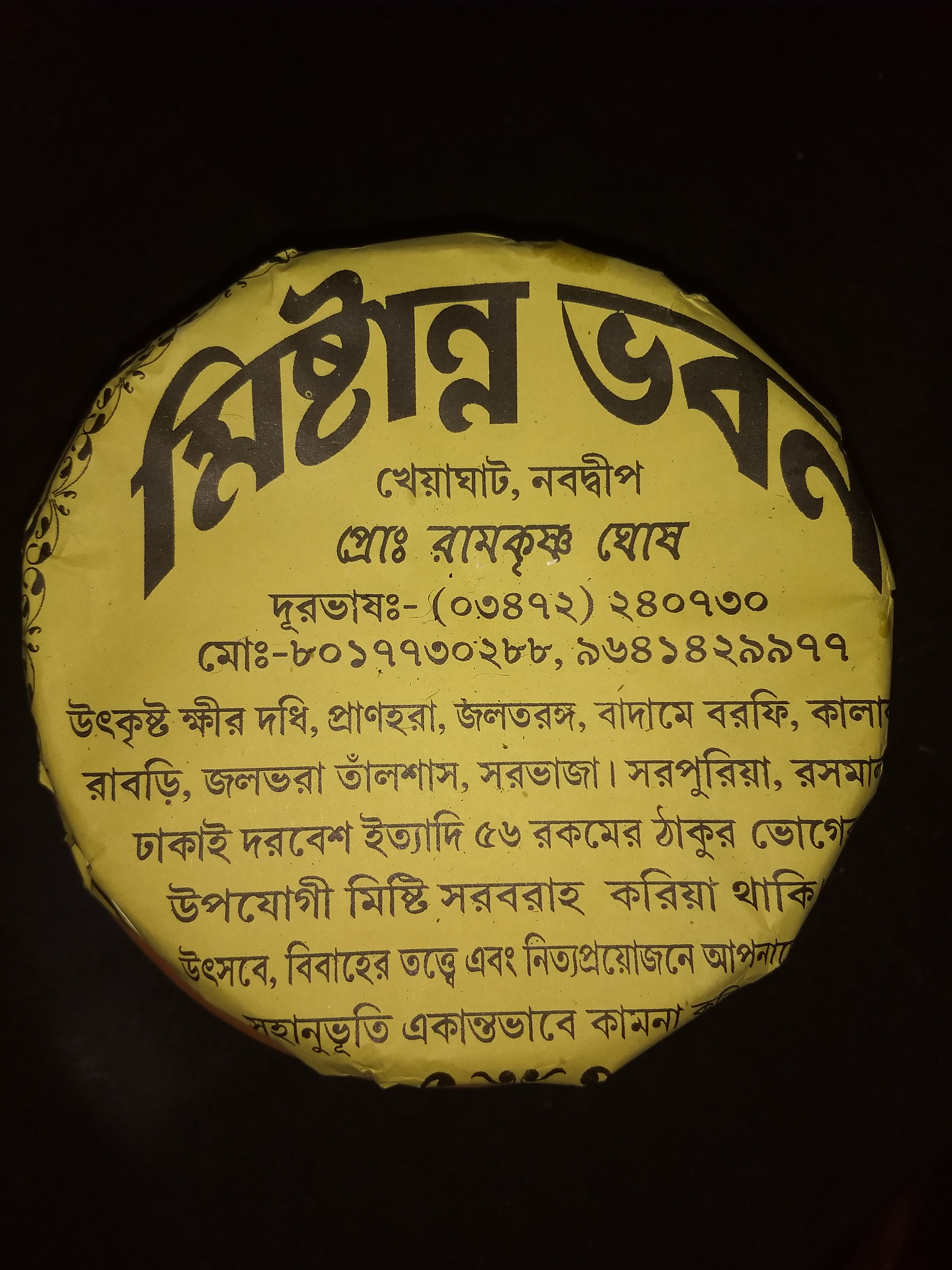
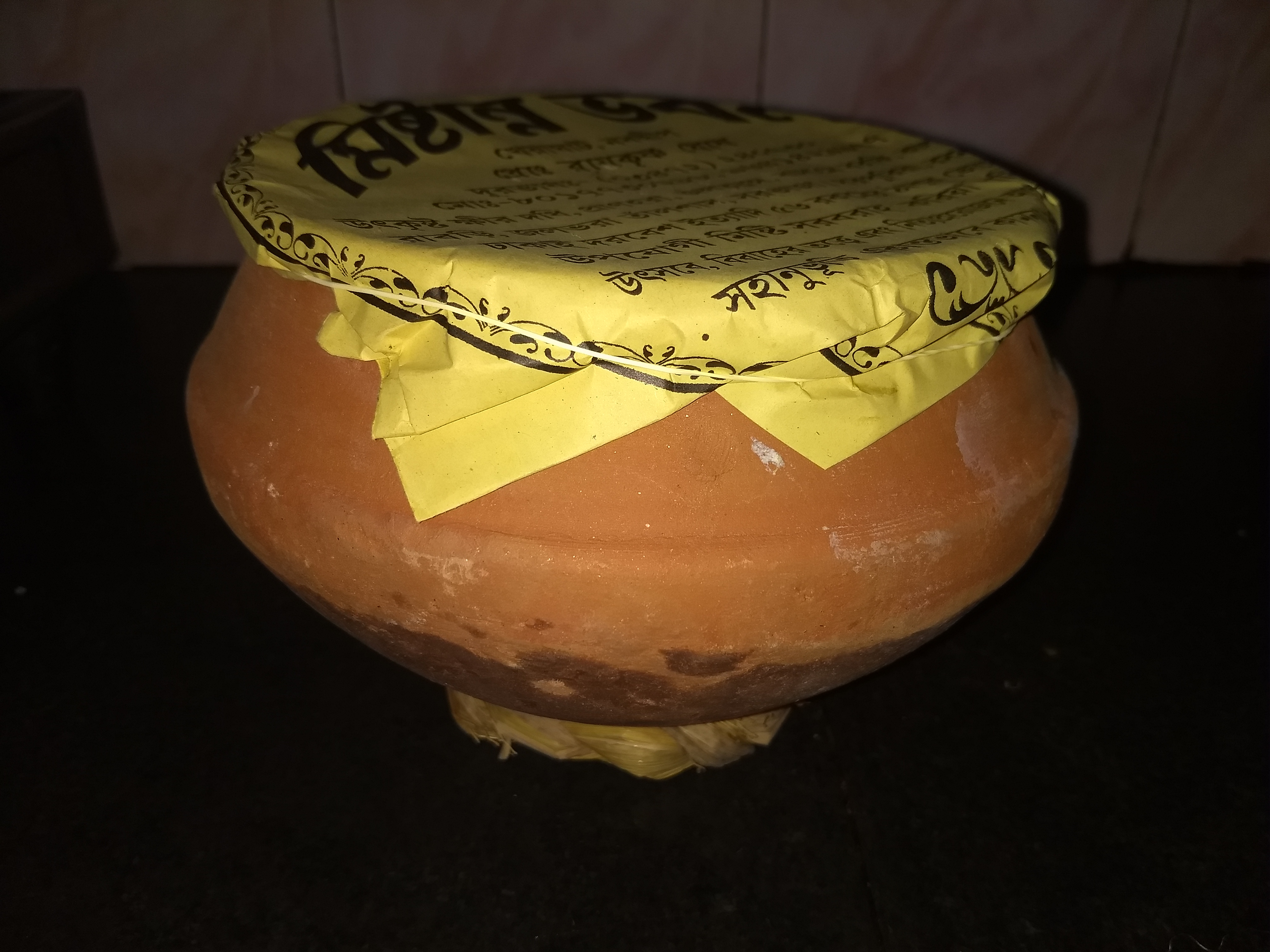
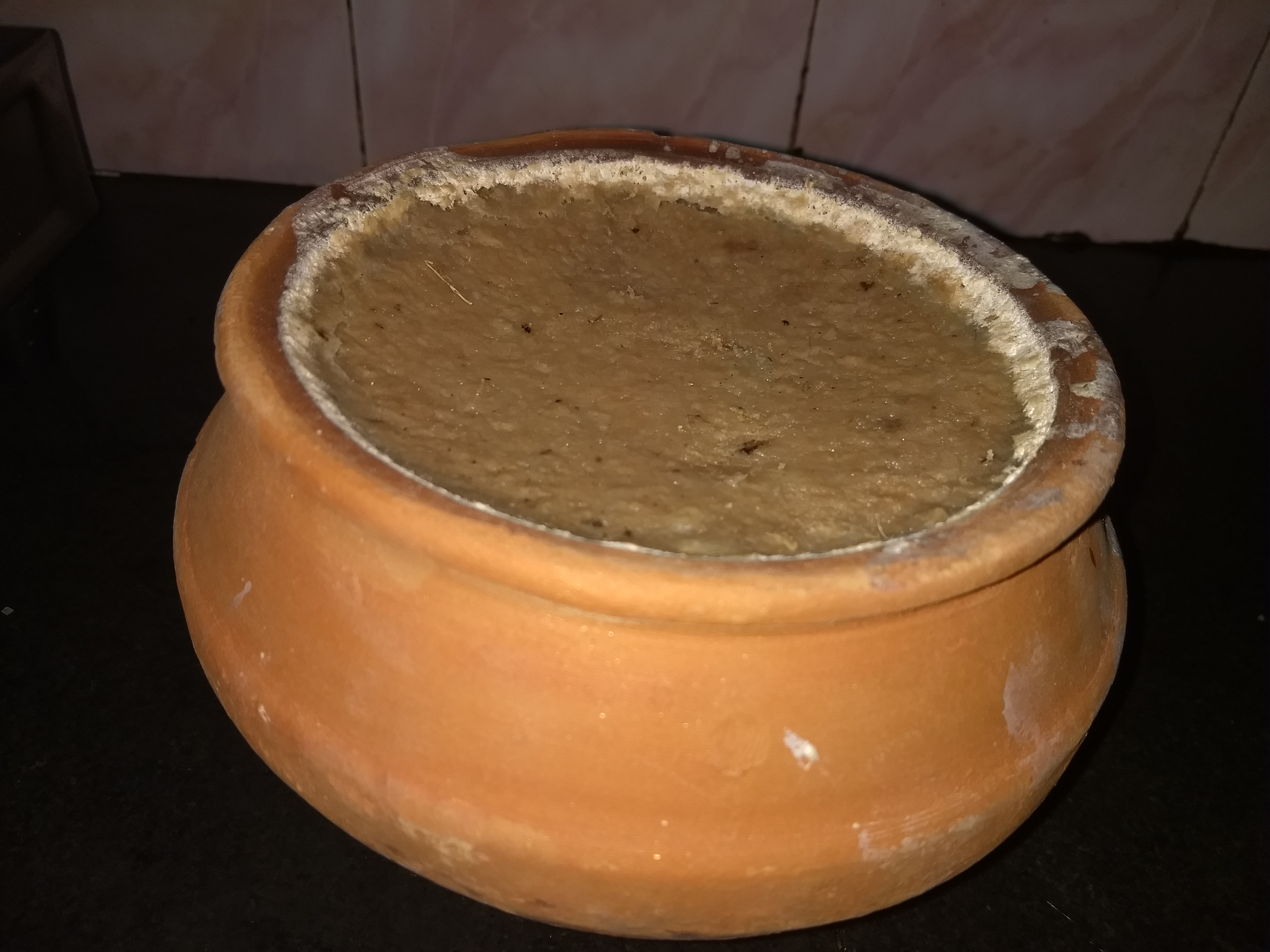
Famous red curd of Nabadwip, kept in clay pipkin (Bengali: মাটির হাঁড়ি)

There is a legend behind red curd. It is known from Nabadwip's archaeological council that the birthplace of red curd is Nabadwips Phasitala, and the inventor is Kali Ghosh. Kali Ghosh and Hari Ghosh were two brothers, they used to make mostly curd and whey. They used to boil buffalo milk in a gentle fire pouring a small amount of water to make it as condensed milk for a long time. The milk was turned reddish due to long burning. The two brothers used to make wheys from the milk. Their whey making area was known as Red Ghol or Red Whey. When milk becomes thick, it reaches to kheer stage, so sometimes it is called Kheer yogurt.

Another name for this curd is Chakku yogurt. There is also a reason behind the name. The quality of the curd is judged on its stickiness. To test it, it is also seen by turning down the pot. Even a Chakku or a knife is inserted inside the pot. Thus the name of Chakku yogurt came from that knife.

== Preparation ==
This curd or yogurt is prepared in two steps. In the first step the milk is boiled; this step is known as foot. In the second step, the milk is fermented to make curd. To prepare the yogurt, pure milk of cow or buffalo is required. There is also a huge contribution of fuel to prepare the red curd. Two types of fuel is needed for preparing the curd. It takes two to six hours to take the first 'foot' of the boiling and it is made by burning wood. The 'foot' will continue until the red color is taken. Nearly three liters of milk is turned into one liter. The next stage of this step is burning in coal. In the case of white yogurt, milk is thickened, at that time, it is needed more time to prepare red curd, i.e. the milk density is thickest for red curd. When the milk is prepared, it is poured in the pots according to the size of the condensed milk, then it is placed around the coal fuel. Then the curd is covered with socks. This step is called yogurt making. And it forms the yogurt. Various types of pot size is supplied according to market demand. The curd contains from 100 grams of clay pots (glass) to five kilograms of yogurt pots. It is the best skill of the makers of Nabadwip that they make this red curd without any outer color.
