= Yogurt =

Food produced by bacterial fermentation of milk

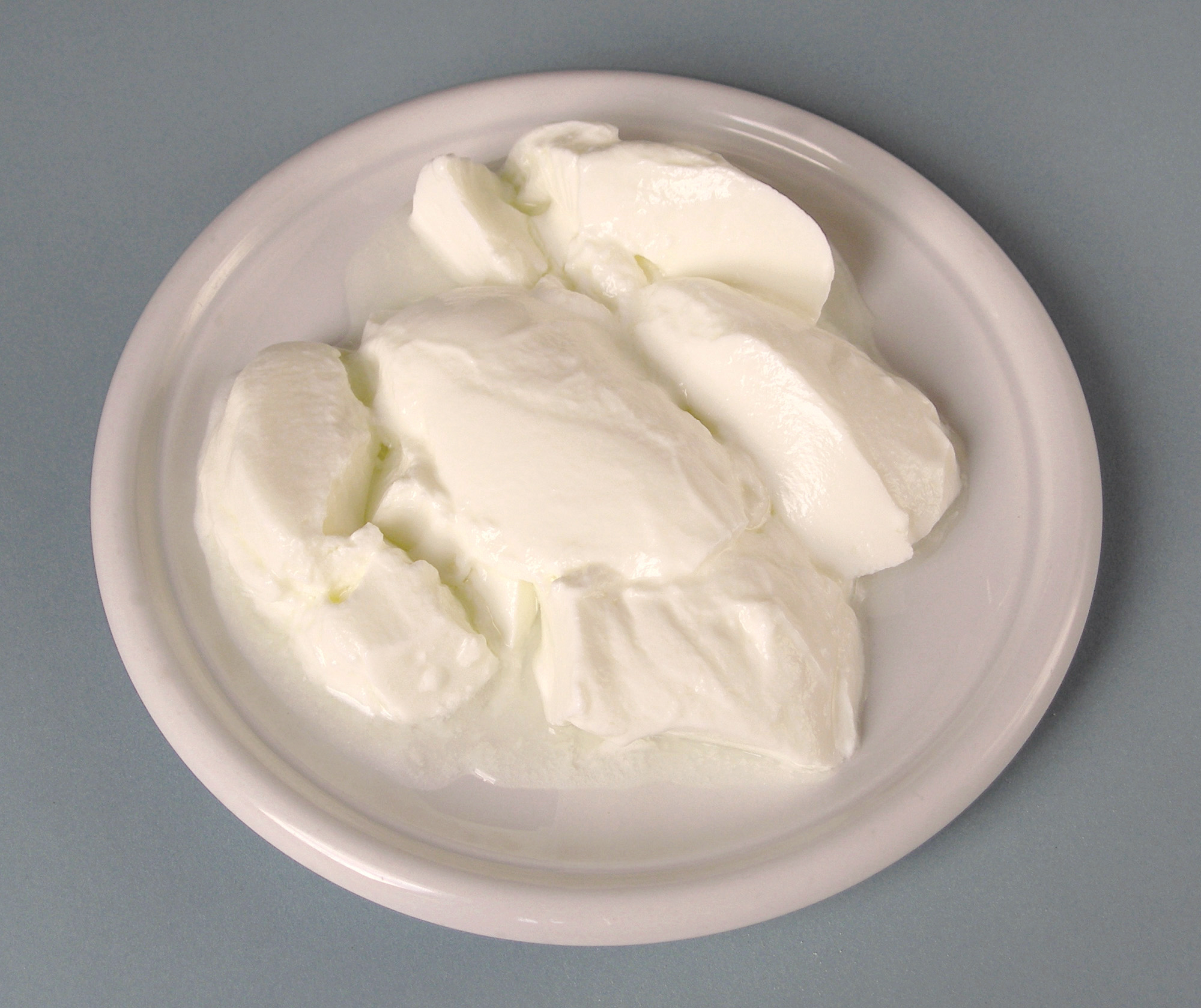
- A plate of yogurt
- Alternative names: Yogourt, yoghourt, jogurt
- Type: Fermented dairy product
- Place of origin: Central Asia and the Near East, or independently in different places (inc. Caucasus, Europe, South Asia)
- Serving temperature: Chilled
- Main ingredients: Milk, bacteria

Yogurt (UK: /ˈjɒɡərt/; US: /ˈjoʊɡərt/; Turkish: yoğurt, pronounced [joˈuɾt]), also spelled yoghurt, is a food produced by bacterial fermentation of milk. The bacteria ferment the sugars in the milk and produce lactic acid, which acts on milk protein to give yogurt its texture and characteristic tart flavor. Yogurt is most commonly made from cow's milk, but milk from water buffalo, goats, ewes, mares, camels, and yaks can also be used.

The main bacteria used to produce yogurt are Lactobacillus delbrueckii subsp. bulgaricus and Streptococcus thermophilus. Other lactobacilli and bifidobacteria are sometimes added during or after culturing yogurt. Some countries require yogurt to contain a specific amount of colony-forming units (CFU) of bacteria; for example, in China, the requirement for the number of lactobacillus bacteria is at least 1 million CFU per milliliter. Some countries also regulate which bacteria can be used: for example, in France, a product can only be labeled as yaourt or yoghourt if it has been fermented exclusively by Lactobacillus delbrueckii subsp. bulgaricus and Streptococcus thermophilus, a requirement that aligns with the international definition of yogurt in the Codex Alimentarius on fermented milk (CXS 243-2003).

The bacterial culture is mixed in, and a warm temperature of 30–45 °C (86–113 °F) is maintained for 4 to 12 hours to allow fermentation to occur, with the higher temperatures working faster but risking a lumpy texture or whey separation.

== Etymology ==
The word, yogurt (also yoghurt with variations), is derived from Ottoman Turkish for yugurt or yoğurt, having its root yog meaning "to condense" as related to yogur (to "knead"). It was first used in English in 1625.

== History ==
=== Origin ===
The tradition of fermenting dairy beverages that ultimately gave rise to modern yogurt goes back to millennia, beginning in the domestication of milk-producing animals in Central Asia and the Near East. Humans likely began incorporating dairy into their diets between 10,000 and 5,000 BC. Milk lipids discovered on vessel fragments at the Barcın Höyük site in northwest Turkey provide some of the oldest archaeological evidence of dairying from the Neolithic period, which have shown that early farmers were already processing, consuming, and transporting dairy products by 6600 BCE. This included the use of specialized four-legged vessels, which allowed the physical agitation necessary for churning milk to create thickened products.

19th-century waterskins and vessels from Bashkortostan, used to ferment mare's milk (kumis)

Due to the rapid spoilage of milk, several methods have been developed to improve the durability of milk. The most widely accepted view in literature is that yogurt emerged through a natural fermentation caused by environmental conditions when nomadic communities carried milk in animal skin bags. Nomads are noted to have refined the fermentation process by reusing vessels and relying on indigenous microflora.

The earliest description of the use of animal skin bags to ferment milk appears in the 11th-century Karakhanid work Dīwān Lughāt al-Turk, defining kumis as "mares' milk which is poured in skins, fermented and drunk", and several containers made from animal skin (e.g. butiq, qasuq, qurluq) that were used to store kumis. A detailed description of this practice is attested by the 13th-century Franciscan friar William of Rubruck, remarking that the Mongols churned a mare's milk product called cosmos, the Latin phonetic transliteration of kumis, in a large animal skin bag with a stick until the liquid fermented and produced an alcoholic drink. In Central Asia, a traditional fermentation process of kumis involves using a horsehide (saba) or stirring the milk in a deep wooden vessel (kubi). Similarly, the German naturalist and explorer Peter Simon Pallas remarked in his 17th-century travelogue Travels Through Various Provinces of the Russian Empire that the Bashkirs constantly stored a sour milk called arjan in a large bottle-shaped animal skin. Kefir grains, historically called gypy ayran, were discovered by local residents in the North Caucasus, when milk sugars interacted with the microflora residing within the folds of the wineskin (gybyt) during transportation, although they may have been produced earlier by Bronze Age populations by around 1500 BC, when the microbial remnants of kefir grains were found in tombs of the Xiaohe Cemetery in Xinjiang, China.

==== Early documentation of the term yogurt ====
The Karakhanid works Dīwān Lughāt al-Turk and Kutadgu Bilig provide the first attestation of yogurt as an established dairy product. In Dīwān Lughāt al-Turk, Mahmud Kashgari records several expressions in relation to yoġrut, including ol yoġrut uḏitti ("he curdled the yogurt"), yoġrut qōrlandi or qoyuldi ("the curdled milk thickened"), and yoġrut sütgärdi ("the yogurt was shaken up until it became as watery as milk"). Central to this practice was qōr, a starter culture consisting of leftover yoġrut or fermented kumis retained at the bottom of a container and used to solidify fresh milk or to ferment kumis. Other recorded milk products include süzmä, qurut (or suġut), ayrān, qatiq, qanaq (or qayaq), suviq yoġrut (diluted yogurt), bulduni (thick mixture of sour and fresh milk), igdük (food made from milk and curdled milk), and iprük (mixture of curdled and fresh milk, consumed as a laxative). The Kutadgu Bilig lists yoġrut as one of the milk products provided by animal-raising people for the household.

The 14th-century Mamluk-era Egyptian cookbook Kanz al-Fawāʾid Fī Tanwīʿ Al-Mawāʾid (Arabic: كنز الفوائد في تنويع الموائد) reveals a recipe for yoġrut under the Arabic name laban yāghurt (Arabic: لبن ياغرت). The preparation involved boiling cow’s or water buffalo’s milk, allowing it to cool, and then adding a starter culture consisting of very sour milk and water-dissolved rennet. The mixture was transferred into vessels to ferment, taking approximately 12 hours to set (either from morning to evening, or overnight).

==== Fermented milk and early yogurt-like products in antiquity ====
Ancient Greek and Roman authors from the Classical period associated dairying with peoples whom they regarded as "barbarians". Notably, Pliny the Elder remarked that "barbarian nations" knew how "to thicken the milk into a substance with an agreeable acidity". Greeks and Romans disliked milk products and regarded them as unimportant, due to a combination of cultural taboos, viewing milk-drinking as a barbaric trait, and environmental factors, such as the rapid spoilage of milk in warm Mediterranean climates, and a biological intolerance to lactose. Similarly, William of Rubruck recorded that the devoted Orthodox Christians living near or under the Mongol frontiers, including the Alans, Georgians, Greeks, Russians, and Ruthenians, restrained from drinking kumis, regarding it as an act of infidelity to the Christian faith.

In Classical literature, the Scythians were notable for their consumption and fermentation of milk, whom the Greeks became acquainted with through Black Sea colonies from the 7th century BC onward. Authors who documented them include Hesiod, Homer, Herodotus, Hippocrates, and Aeschylus. In the Iliad, Homeric expressions, such as Hippemolgi (mare-milkers) and Galactophagi (curd-eaters), were later identified with the Scythians by the ancient Greek geographer Strabo. The Botai culture of northern Kazakhstan provides some of the first archaeological evidence of mare's milk consumption and practicing by around 3500 BC, when fats of mare's milk were found on pottery.

Drinking fermented mare's milk was the daily norm for the Scythians, while the Greeks consumed it for medicinal purposes. Greek authors displayed familiarity with the Scythian milk-processing and its nutritional and therapeutic peculiarities, incorporating them into Greek medical literature by the 5th century BC. For example, the Hippocratic text De affectionibus interioribus prescribes the daily consumption of "agitated horse milk" to treat tuberculosis, whose process resembled the initial stages of the Scythian cheese-like or sour horse milk product called hippake. Herodotus' description of Scythian fermented mare's milk is believed to have described kumis. Greek knowledge of the Scythian dietary likely developed through the experiences of Greek settlers and traders in the Black Sea.

Oxygala (Greek: ὀξύγαλα, lit. 'sour milk') was a fermented milk product well-known in the Hellenistic and Roman periods. Its precise nature remains uncertain, as Ancient Greek, Latin, and Byzantine texts utilized the term oxygala variously for products that have undergone a process of fermentation. Modern scholars have identified oxygala as a product resembling yogurt, cheese or curd, and xinogala (Greek: ξινόγαλα), a modern Greek beverage regarded as synonymous of ayran. The product was considered suitable for consumption in the Greek and Roman diet because it was thought to be easier to digest. However, to counteract its potential harmful effects, such as dentin hypersensitivity and kidney stones, the 2nd-century physician Galen recommended mixing it with honey. One of the earliest references to oxygala appears in a surviving fragment from the Philippica by the 4th-century BC Greek historian Theopompus, preserved by Hesychius of Alexandria. The passage describes oxygala hippeion (Greek: ὀξύγαλα ἵππειον, lit. 'sour mare's milk') as a food consumed by the Scythians, both as a drink and iin solidified form. A more detailed description of oxygala is found in the 1st-century De re rustica by the Roman author Columella, which appears to have produced quark or cottage cheese. Pliny the Elder describes oxygala as a solid curd by-product that was obtained when butter was made. Later Greek authors, such as Oribasius, Aëtius of Amida, Anthimus, and Paul of Aegina, and the Byzantine agricultural treatise Geoponica, mention oxygala as a medical remedy.

The Rigveda (Sanskrit: ऋग्वेद), an ancient Indian collection from the Vedic period, contains early references to dahi (Sanskrit: दधि)., which is considered to be the equivalent of modern curd or yogurt. The text outlines two ways of producing dahi, either by using the backslopping method, which uses a portion of a previous batch as a starter culture, or by adding vegetal material, such as putika, kuvala, or the bark of palasha. The Rigveda credits dahi with providing good nutrition, helping digestion, and treating gastrointestinal issues, such as diarrhea and dysentery.

One of the earliest historical references to processed dairy in China appears in the 1st century BC Chinese collection Book of Rites, where a preserved milk product called lǐlào (Chinese: 醴酪) is recognized as a skill integrated into early Chinese civilization. During the Han dynasty, Chinese sources record the preparation of a fermented yogurt called lào (Chinese: 酪), made from cow and sheep milk, noting that the product and the word lào was adopted from Central Asian pastoralists that lived along the northern and northwestern frontiers of modern-day China. Around the same period, the Book of Han describes the Hu ren (Chinese: 胡人) as a nomadic people, without a land or city to their name, who "eat meat and drink yogurt". The 6th-century book Qimin Yaoshu, compiled during the Northern Wei dynasty, contains detailed instructions for making lào, which involves boiling slowly and continuously stirring the raw milk, straining the cooked milk into clay bottles, inoculating the milk with a sweet yogurt starter or a sour porridge paste as a substituting once cooled, and wrapping the vessels in felt or wadding to insulate them overnight until the yogurt sets. It also gives methods for producing variations, including gānlào (Chinese: 乾酪, lit. 'dried curdled milk') and lùlào (Chinese: 漉酪, lit. 'strained curdled milk'), and for the starter, mǎlào jiào (Chinese: 馬酪酵, lit. 'mares' milk starter').

Julius Caesar, in his 1st-century book Commentarii de Bello Gallico, observed that the Germanic diet consisted mainly of products from their flocks and herds, including milk. According to the Roman historian Tacitus in his treatise Germania, early Germanic tribes sustained themselves on wild fruit and lac concretum ("curdled milk"). Icelandic medieval literature, including Egil's saga and Grettis saga, mentions skyr, a thick, sour dairy product. Although commonly classified as a thick yogurt, the product is technically an acid-curd cheese. The traditional production of skyr involves heating and cooling skimmed milk, adding a bacterial culture from a previous batch of skyr to trigger coagulation, and straining the cultured mixture to remove the liquid whey, resulting in a rich, creamy texture. Since the 16th century, Swedish texts record surmjölk, a milk product coagulated through lactic acid fermentation. It was traditionally made using starter cultures like certain herbs (such as butterwort), acids, previously soured milk, or through spontaneous souring. Historically known by regional names like filbunke, långfil, and tötmjölk, today it corresponds to filmjölk. A similar Finnish variant is known as viili.

==== Medieval period ====
The Parthian poem Draxt ī Āsūrīg, surviving in the Book Pahlavi script, contains several dairy items, including mâst ("curds"), dōx ("churned sour milk"), kašk ("dried buttermilk"), and hur ("kumis"). Mâst (Persian: ماست) is the modern Persian word for yogurt, whose preparation methods, as well as for its dried form (kašk), are believed to have spread from Central Asia to the Iranian plateau in ancient times. Kumis was introduced to modern-day Iran during the Mongol and Timurid periods. The 10th-century Abbasid cookbook Kitāb al-Ṭabīkh, compiled by Ibn Sayyār al-Warrāq, provides a recipe for laban māst (Arabic: لبن مست), which involves letting the milk to sour in an earthenware jar from morning until midday, mixing in a portion of rennet into the milk once souring begins, beating the mixture by hand, and leaving it undisturbed overnight until it thickens.

The presence of māst Fârisi, meaning "Persian milk", in medieval Arabic cookbooks may indicate that yogurt was introduced to Arab cuisine through Persian influence during the medieval period. Yogurt may have also been introduced to Arab cuisine by military slaves of Turkic origin in the Mamluk, who served under the Abbasids from the 9th century. Those who rose through the ranks of the Abbasid Caliphate were introduced to the refined cuisine and table manners (adab) of the court elite. In Egypt, the Mamluks seized power to establish the Mamluk Sultanate. Despite ruling an Arabic-speaking region, they retained their traditional Turkic cuisine, including staples like yogurt, kurut, and kaymak.

Medieval Arabic cookbooks like the Kitāb al-Ṭabīkh document a variety of fermented milk products. Standard and sour yogurts included laban māst, laban rāyib or rā'ib (Arabic: شيراز, 'defatted yogurt made without rennet'), , while concentrated and dried options featured laban ḥāmiḍ (Arabic: لبن ثخين حامض, 'drained sour yogurt'), shīrāz (Arabic: شيراز, 'drained yogurt'), shīrāz ṭayyib 'adhb (Arabic: شيراز طيب عذب, 'sweet drained yogurt'), bīrāf (Arabic: بيراف, 'clotted cream'), and kishk (Arabic: كشك, 'dried dough of wheat and yogurt'). Liquid derivatives included makhīḍ (Arabic: مخيض) and dūgh (Arabic: دوغ , 'buttermilks'), alongside maṣl (Arabic: كشك, 'drained yogurt whey'). Yogurt condiments included jājaq and khilāṭ.

In the South Caucasus, a fermented milk product called matzoon is attested in medieval Armenian manuscripts by Grigor Magistros (11th century), Hovhannes Erznkatsi (13th century), Grigor Tatevatsi (14th century) and others. Matsoni is mentioned in the 15th-century Georgian medical book Karabadini by Zaza Panaskerteli-Tsitsishvili.

The preparation of fermented milk products in the Balkans dates back to the 7th century, where a form of yogurt called katuk was prepared by the Bulgars, which was made by mixing warm milk with a "starter culture" made from naturally fermented sheep's milk or sheep's cheese blended with water. Katuk has survived in an unchanged form to the present day, in which it is still made in many rural areas of the region at the end of the sheep-milking season. Due to identical terms for a similar product exist across Turkic nations, it is suggested that katuk is of Turkic origin.

==== Discovery of the microbial basis of yogurt ====
Advances in microbiology during the late 19th and early 20th centuries revealed the microbial basis that drives yogurt fermentation. In 1905, the Bulgarian medical student Stamen Grigorov in Geneva isolated the bacterium now known as Lactobacillus delbrueckii subsp. bulgaricus from home-made Bulgarian yogurt or soured milk which he had brought from his native village, a discovery that enabled the industrial use of defined starter cultures.

The Russian biologist and Nobel laureate Ilya Mechnikov, from the Institut Pasteur in Paris, was influenced by Grigorov's work and hypothesized that regular consumption of yogurt was responsible for the unusually long lifespans of Bulgarian peasants. Believing Lactobacillus to be essential for good health, Mechnikov worked to popularize yogurt as a foodstuff throughout Europe.

Genome sequencing of L. d. bulgaricus reveals that the lactic acid bacteria adapted from a plant-associated habitat into the lactose-rich and stable protein milk environment through the loss of superfluous functions and protocooperation with Streptococcus thermophilus. The two bacterium used for modern yogurt production may have originated from plants in Bulgaria, where viable, fermenting strains of L. d. bulgaricus and S. thermophilus have been successfully cultivated from native plant samples.

=== Western commercialization of yogurt ===
==== Europe ====
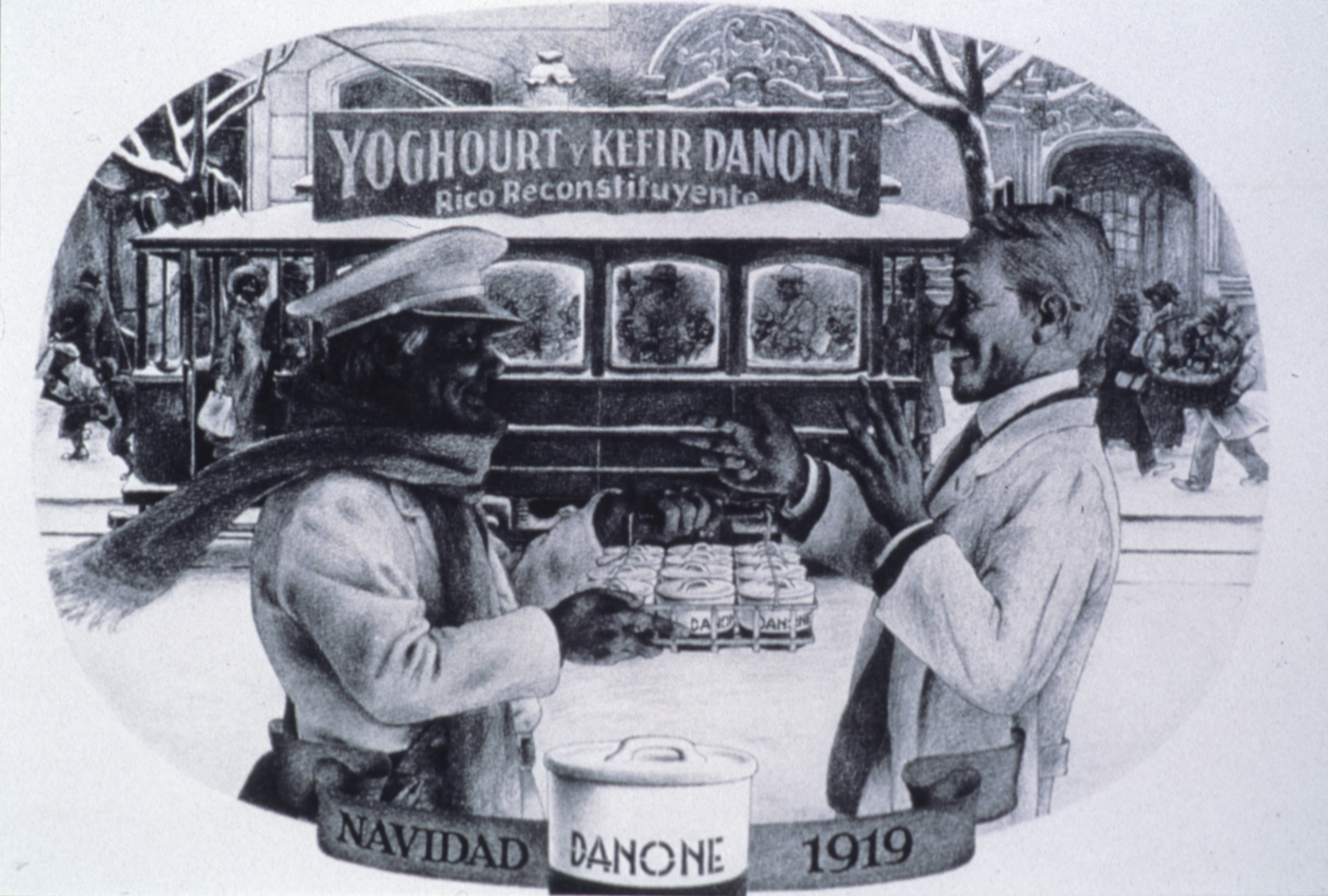
A Spanish poster on Danone, 1919

In the early 20th century, within the Ottoman Empire, Salonica (modern-day Thessaloniki, Greece) was home to the largest Sephardic Jewish community. Among the most respected Jewish families in the city was the Carasso (Karasu) family. When Salonica fell of Ottoman control and was incorporated into the Kingdom of Greece after the Balkan Wars, Isaac Carasso emigrated to Barcelona, Spain, with his wife and children, opening a medical practice and adapting his birth name İzak Karasu to the Spanish spelling upon his arrival.

During the years of poverty that gripped Europe following World War I, an epidemic of diarrhea broke out among children in Barcelona. Recalling how yogurt was widely used to treat diarrheal diseases in Salonica, Isaac Carasso took an interest in the research of Élie Metchnikoff and decided to introduce it in Spain, where he began to produce yogurt in his home basement in 1919 using lactic cultures incorporated from several farms. Since yogurt was largely unknown in Western Europe, Isaac Carasso faced significant hurdles before finally obtaining permission to sell it as a medicinal product, which began to be sold in pharmacies and later in dairy shops. When his product proved successful as a remedy and when he applied for a patent, Isaac Carasso wanted to name it "Danon", the Catalan nickname "petit Daniel" of his son Daniel's name, but this was rejected as a proper name could not serve as a trade name under Spanish law. He then added the letter "e" to register the brand, which became "Danone". In 1923, Isaac Carasso received a report from the medical school confirming that yogurt was a natural, health-promoting food, and the product became renowned in Barcelona and Madrid.

The first Danone retail store in Paris, France, opened in 1929

After commercial studies in Marseille and a bacteriology placement at the Institut Pasteur, Daniel Carasso, the son of Isaac Carasso, founded the Société Parisienne du Yoghourt Danone in Paris in 1929, marking the introduction of the Danone brand in France. The first factory opened in 1932 in Levallois-Perret. Following the outbreak of World War II and the occupation of France, Daniel Carasso took refuge in New York in 1941, where he continued to develop the brand and launched the "Dannon Milk Products" in the following year after acquiring a yogurt manufacturer. The brand's spelling was Americanized to avoid mispronunciation on the advice of French publicist Raymond Loewy. After World World II ended, he returned to France, selling his American company to Beatrice Foods (it would be repurchased by Danone France in 1981). Since his American experience had taught him how to establish modern dairy factories, Daniel Carasso set up the necessary modern facilities for dairy production in France.

A portrait of Aram Dökmeciyan

The Dökmeciyan, an Armenian family from Kayseri, established a successful yogurt farm in Istanbul in the late 19th century before expanding their business into the printing industry. Their eldest son, Aram Dökmeciyan, moved to Paris in the early 1900s, alongside his younger brother Artin, to pursue a doctorate in law at the Sorbonne University. Following their father's death, financial remittances from Istanbul ceased, prompting Aram to follow his family's original trade of yogurt production. The French public opinion towards yogurt was poor due to unfamiliarity with the taste and health concerns. To validate the product, Aram consulted the Russian zoologist Élie Metchnikoff at the Pasteur Institute, who was actively researching on yogurt. Metchnikoff provided the necessary report on the safety and health benefits of yogurt, which led to "Yogourt Aram" gaining commercial popularity in Paris in 1912. Aram operated the business successfully until World War II, during which the death of his only son led him to cease operations and sell the facility to the Danone company.

Yogurt with added fruit jam was patented in 1933 by the Radlická Mlékárna dairy in Prague.

==== North America ====
Yogurt was introduced to the United States in the first decade of the twentieth century, influenced by Élie Metchnikoff's The Prolongation of Life; Optimistic Studies (1908); it was available in tablet form for those with digestive intolerance and for home culturing. It was popularized by John Harvey Kellogg at the Battle Creek Sanitarium, where it was administered both orally and in yoghurt enemas. Kellogg's promotion of yoghurt was part of a larger drive to promote a healthy, including vegetarian, diet. Later, Armenian immigrants Sarkis and Rose Colombosian started the Colombo and Sons Creamery in Andover, Massachusetts, in 1929.

Colombo yogurt was reportedly first delivered around New England in a horse-drawn wagon bearing the Armenian word "madzoon"; this was later replaced with "yogurt", a term that was more familiar to many of the company's customers from the eastern Mediterranean and Near East. Yogurt's popularity in the United States was enhanced in the 1950s and 1960s, when it was presented as a health food by scientists like Hungarian-born bacteriologist Stephen A. Gaymont. Plain yogurt still proved too sour for the American palate and in 1966 Colombo Yogurt sweetened the yogurt and added fruit preserves, creating "fruit on the bottom" style yogurt. This was successful and company sales soon exceeded $1 million per year. By the late 20th century, yogurt had become a common American food item and Colombo Yogurt was sold in 1993 to General Mills, which discontinued the brand in 2010.

== Nutrition ==
Yogurt, Greek, plain (unsweetened), whole milk (daily value)
Nutritional value per 100 g (3.5 oz)
- Energy: 406 kJ (97 kcal)
- Carbohydrates: 3.98 g
- Sugars: 4.0 g
- Dietary fiber: 0 g
- Fat: 5.0 g
- Protein: 9.0 g
Vitamins and minerals
Vitamins	Quantity %DV^{†}
Vitamin A equiv. beta-Carotene lutein zeaxanthin	0% 26 μg 22 μg
Thiamine (B1)	2% 0.023 mg
Riboflavin (B2)	21% 0.278 mg
Niacin (B3)	1% 0.208 mg
Pantothenic acid (B5)	7% 0.331 mg
Vitamin B6	4% 0.063 mg
Folate (B9)	1% 5 μg
Vitamin B12	31% 0.75 μg
Choline	3% 15.1 mg
Vitamin C	0% 0 mg
Minerals	Quantity %DV^{†}
Calcium	8% 100 mg
Iron	0% 0 mg
Magnesium	3% 11 mg
Manganese	0% 0.009 mg
Phosphorus	11% 135 mg
Potassium	5% 141 mg
Sodium	2% 35 mg
Zinc	5% 0.52 mg
- Other constituents: Quantity
- Selenium: 9.7 µg
- Water: 81.3 g
- Link to Full Report from USDA Database
- ^{†}Percentages estimated using US recommendations for adults, except for potassium, which is estimated based on expert recommendation from the National Academies.

Plain yogurt from whole milk is 81% water, 9% protein, 5% fat, and 4% carbohydrates, including 4% sugars. A 100-gram amount provides 406 kilojoules (97 kcal) of dietary energy. As a proportion of the Daily Value (DV), a serving of yogurt is a rich source of vitamin B_{12} (31% DV) and riboflavin (23% DV), with moderate content of protein, phosphorus, and selenium (14 to 19% DV; table).

Comparison of whole milk and plain yogurt from whole milk, one cup (245 g) each
Property	Milk	Yogurt
Energy	610 kJ (146 kcal)	620 kJ (149 kcal)
Total carbohydrates	12.8 g	12 g
Total fat	7.9 g	8.5 g
Cholesterol	24 mg	32 mg
Protein	7.9 g	9 g
Calcium	276 mg	296 mg
Phosphorus	222 mg	233 mg
Potassium	349 mg	380 mg
Sodium	98 mg	113 mg
Vitamin A	249 IU	243 IU
Vitamin C	0.0 mg	1.2 mg
Vitamin D	96.5 IU	~
Vitamin E	0.1 mg	0.1 mg
Vitamin K	0.5 μg	0.5 μg
Thiamine	0.1 mg	0.1 mg
Riboflavin	0.3 mg	0.3 mg
Niacin	0.3 mg	0.2 mg
Vitamin B_{6}	0.1 mg	0.1 mg
Folate	12.2 μg	17.2 μg
Vitamin B_{12}	1.1 μg	0.9 μg
Choline	34.9 mg	37.2 mg
Betaine	1.5 mg	~
Water	215 g	215 g
Ash	1.7 g	1.8 g

Tilde (~) represents missing or incomplete data. There is little difference between whole milk and yogurt made from whole milk with respect to the listed nutritional constituents.

== Health research ==
Because it may contain live cultures, yogurt is often associated with probiotics, which have been postulated as having positive effects on immune, cardiovascular or metabolic health.

A 2011 review stated that high-quality clinical evidence was insufficient to conclude that consuming yogurt lowers the risk of diseases or otherwise improves health. Meta-analyses found that consuming 80 grams per day of low-fat yogurt was associated with a lower risk of developing type 2 diabetes and a lower incidence of hip fracture in post-menopausal women. A 2021 review found a cause-and-effect relationship between yogurt consumption and improved lactose tolerance and digestion, and that potential associations exist between yogurt consumption and improving bone health, as well as lowering the risk of some diseases, including cancers and metabolic syndrome. Daily intake of 50 grams of yogurt has been shown to reduce risk of overweight or obesity by 13%, and reduce risk of type 2 diabetes by 7%. Yogurt consumption has been associated with reduced risk of cardiovascular disease, and insulin resistance. Some of the benefits were somewhat better for the lower fat yogurts. Many commercial yogurt products are supplemented with extra probiotic bacteria.

== Safety ==
Yogurt made with raw milk can be contaminated with bacteria that can cause significant illness and even result in death, including Listeria, Cryptosporidium, Campylobacter, Brucella, Escherichia coli and Salmonella. Yogurts can also be contaminated with aflatoxin-producing Aspergillus flavus, Aspergillus parasiticus and Aspergillus nomius.

Contamination occurs in traditionally prepared yogurts more often than industrially processed ones, but may affect the latter as well if manufacturing and packaging practices are suboptimal.

When mold forms on yogurt, scraping it off does not eliminate it, as yogurt's consistency allows the mold to penetrate and spread deeply under the surface.

== Varieties and presentation ==
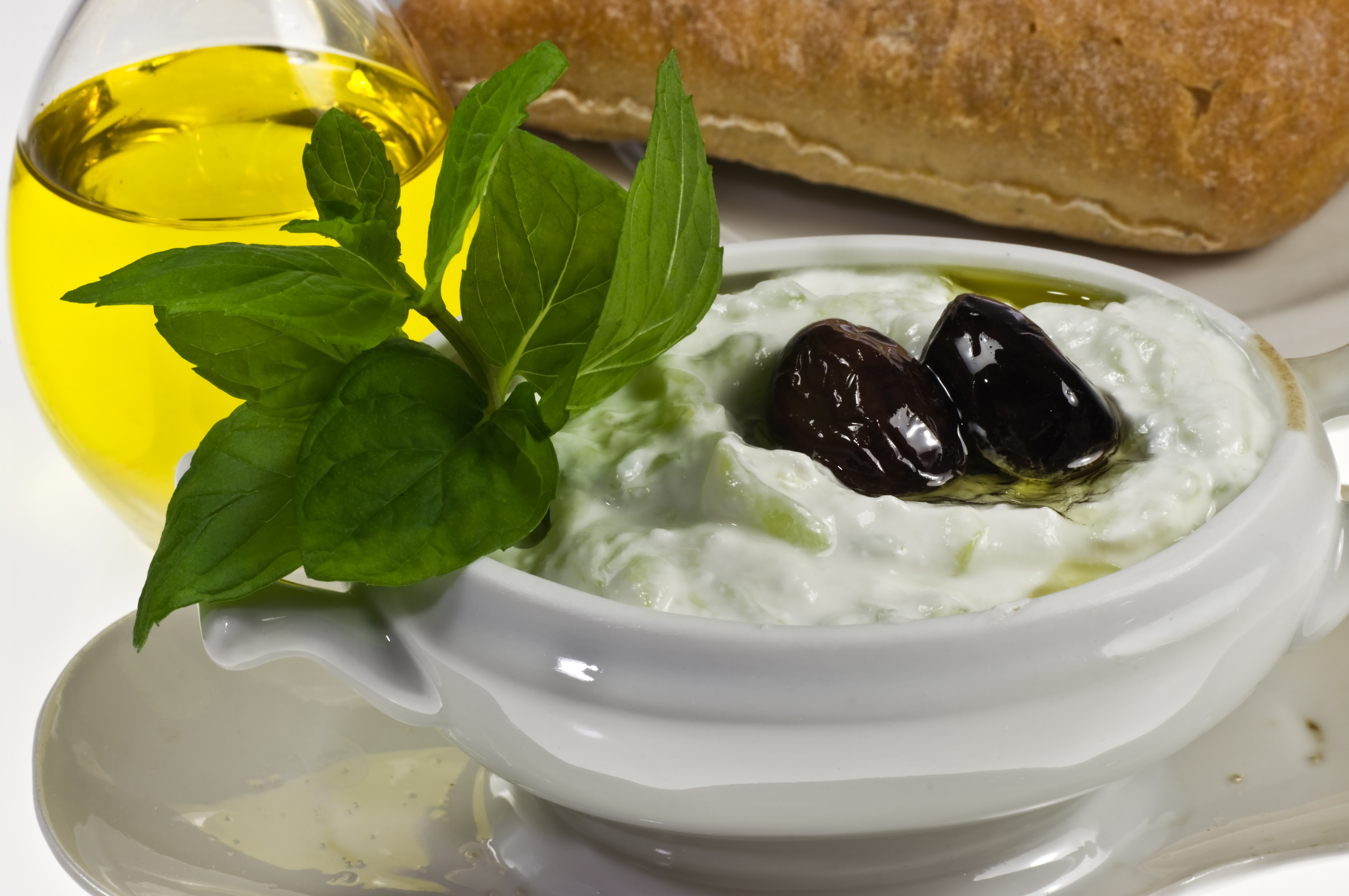
Tzatziki or cacık is a meze made with yogurt, cucumber, olive oil and fresh mint or dill.

Various techniques for fermenting milk into yogurts exist across countries and local regions.

Dahi is a yogurt from the Indian subcontinent, known for its characteristic taste and consistency. The word dahi seems to be derived from the Sanskrit word dadhi ("sour milk"), one of the five elixirs, or panchamrita, often used in Hindu ritual. Sweetened dahi (mishti doi or meethi dahi) is common in eastern parts of India, made by fermenting sweetened milk. While cow's milk is currently the primary ingredient for yogurt, goat and buffalo milk were widely used in the past, and valued for the fat content (see buffalo curd).

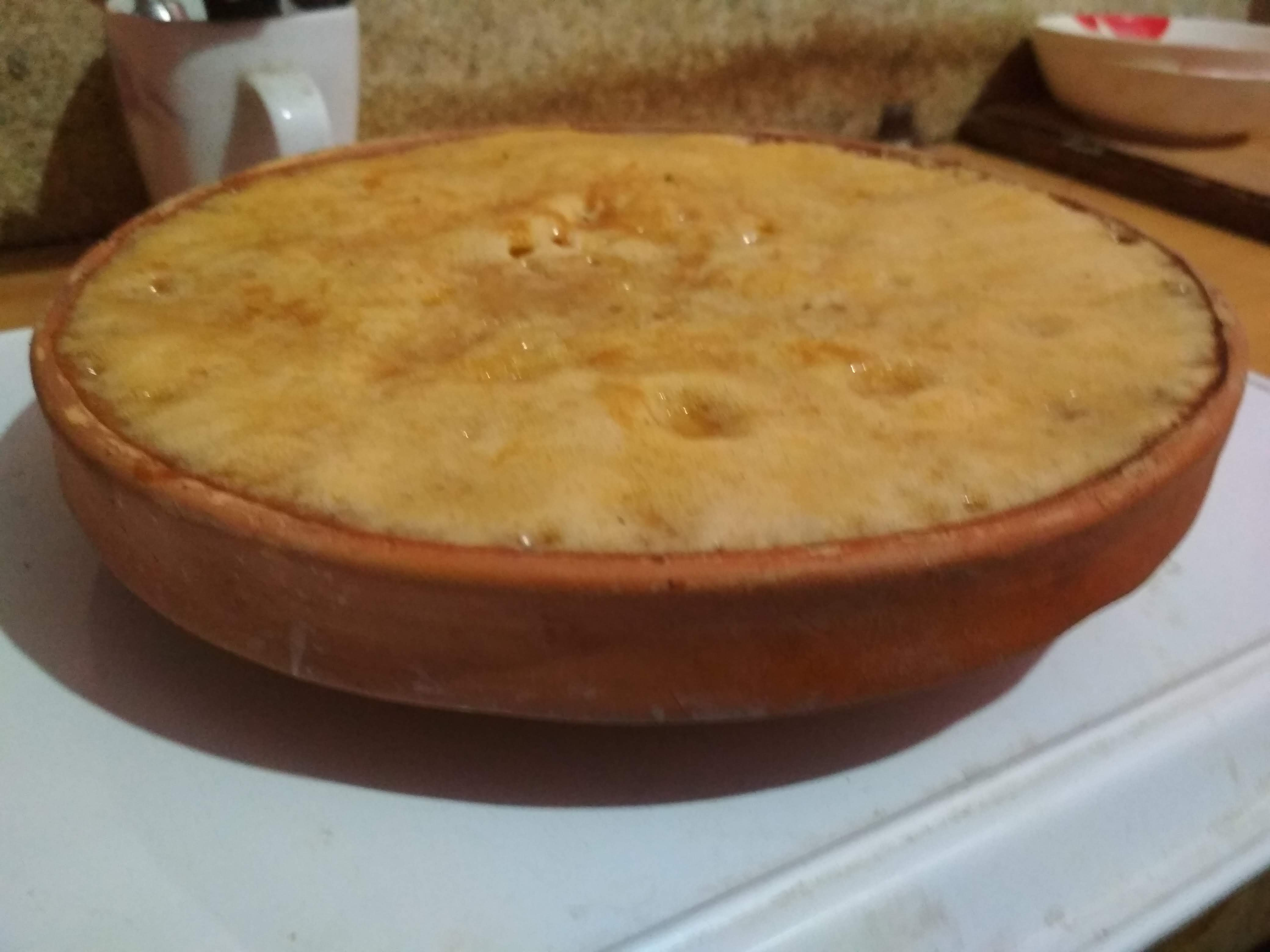
Bogurar doi or misti doi

Bogurar doi is a traditional sweetened yogurt originating from Bogura, Bangladesh. It is a widely-consumed regional dairy product, forming part of Bangladeshi culinary heritage. It has formal recognition as a geographical indication product in Bangladesh.

Dadiah or dadih is a traditional West Sumatran yogurt made from water buffalo milk, fermented in bamboo tubes. Yogurt is common in Nepal, where it is served as both an appetizer and dessert. Locally called dahi, it is a part of the Nepali culture, used in local festivals, marriage ceremonies, parties, religious occasions, family gatherings, and so on. One Nepalese yogurt is called juju dhau, originating from the city of Bhaktapur. In Tibet, yak milk (technically dri milk, as the word yak refers to the male animal) is made into yogurt (and butter and cheese) and consumed.

In Northern Iran, mâst chekide is a variety of kefir yogurt with a distinct sour taste. It is usually mixed with a pesto-like water and fresh herb purée called delal. Common appetizers are spinach or eggplant borani, and wild shallots.

Matzoon is an Armenian yogurt in the Caucasus and Russia. Tarator and cacık are cold soups made from yogurt in eastern Europe. They are made with ayran, cucumbers, dill, salt, olive oil, and optionally garlic and ground walnuts. Tzatziki in Greece and milk salad in Bulgaria are thick yogurt-based salads similar to tarator.

Khyar w laban (cucumber and yogurt salad) is a dish in Lebanon and Syria. Also, a wide variety of local Lebanese and Syrian dishes are cooked with yogurt like "kibbi bi laban" rahmjoghurt, a creamy yogurt with much higher fat content (10%) than many yogurts offered in English-speaking countries. Dovga, a yogurt soup cooked with a variety of herbs and rice, is served warm in winter or refreshingly cold in summer. Jameed, yogurt salted and dried to preserve it, is consumed in Jordan. Zabadi is the type of yogurt made in Egypt, usually from the milk of the Egyptian water buffalo. It is particularly associated with Ramadan fasting, as it is thought to prevent thirst during all-day fasting.

=== Sweetened and flavored ===
To offset its natural sourness, yogurt is also sold sweetened, sweetened and flavored or in containers with fruit or fruit jam on the bottom. The two styles of yogurt commonly found in the grocery store are set-style yogurt and Swiss-style yogurt. Set-style yogurt is poured into individual containers to set, while Swiss-style yogurt is stirred prior to packaging. Either may have fruit added to increase sweetness.

Lassi is a common Indian beverage made from stirred liquified yogurt that is either salted or sweetened with sugar commonly, less commonly honey and combined with fruit pulp to create flavored lassi. Consistency can vary widely, with urban and commercial lassis having uniform texture through being processed, whereas rural and rustic lassi has discernible curds or fruit pulp.

Large amounts of sugar – or other sweeteners for low-energy yogurts – are often used in commercial yogurt. Some yogurts contain added modified starch, pectin (found naturally in fruit) or gelatin to create thickness and creaminess. This type of yogurt may be marketed under the name Swiss-style, although it is unrelated to conventional Swiss yogurt. Some yogurts, often called "cream line", are made with whole milk which has not been homogenized so the cream rises to the top. In many countries, sweetened, flavored yogurt is common, typically sold in single-serving plastic cups. Common flavors may include vanilla, honey, and toffee, and various fruits. In the early 21st century, yogurt flavors inspired by desserts, such as chocolate or cheesecake, became common. There is concern about the health effects of sweetened yogurt due to its high sugar content, although research indicates that use of sugar in yogurt manufacturing has decreased since 2016 in response to WHO and government initiatives to combat obesity.

=== Straining ===
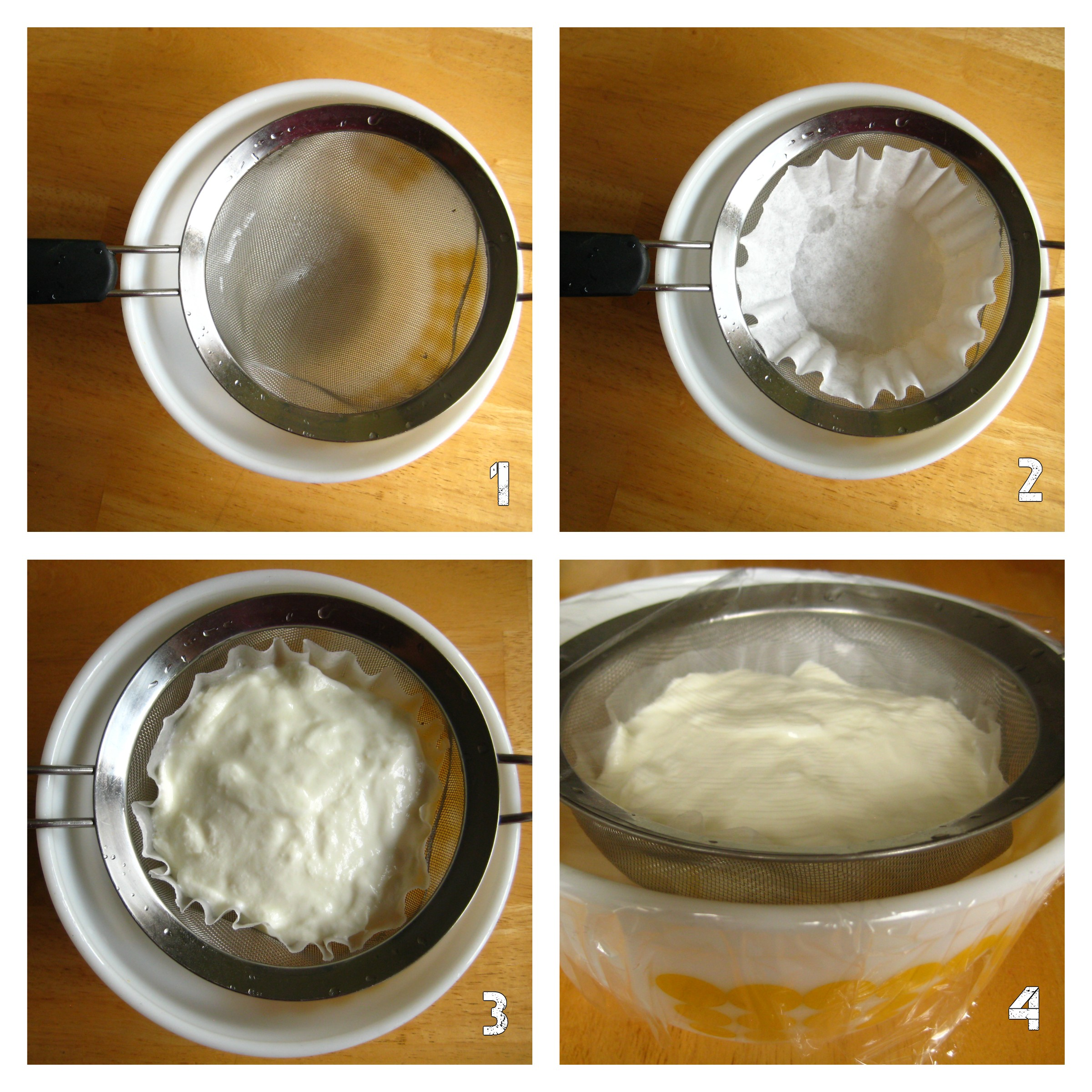
A coffee filter used to strain yogurt in a home refrigerator

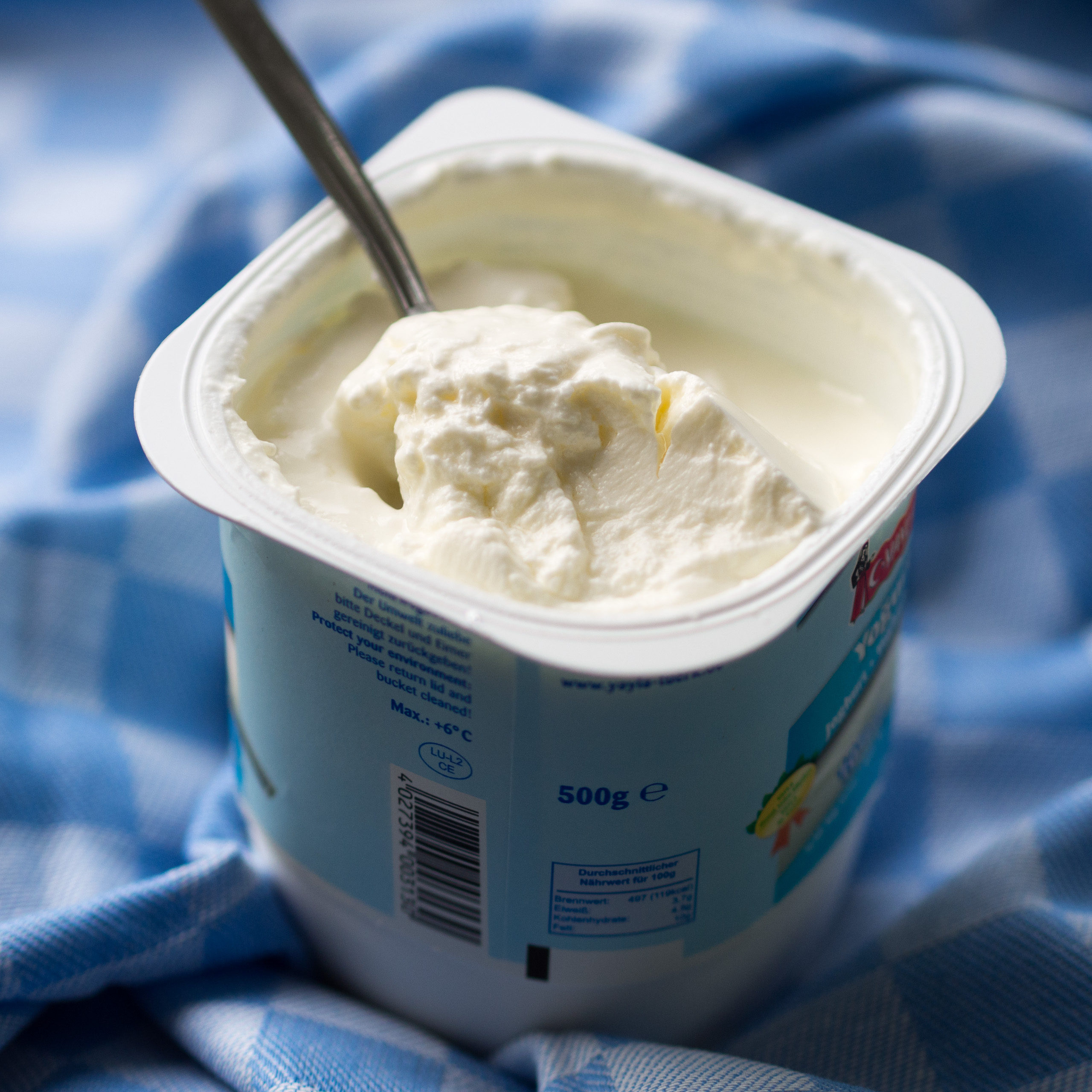
Unstirred Turkish Süzme Yoğurt (strained yogurt), with a 10% fat content

Strained yogurt has been strained through a filter, traditionally made of muslin and more recently of paper or non-muslin cloth. This removes the whey, giving a much thicker consistency. Strained yogurt is made at home, especially if using skimmed milk which results in a thinner consistency. Yogurt that has been strained to filter or remove the whey is known as labneh in Middle Eastern countries. It has a consistency between that of yogurt and cheese. It may be used for sandwiches in Middle Eastern countries. Olive oil, cucumber slices, olives, and various green herbs may be added. It can be thickened further and rolled into balls, preserved in olive oil, and fermented for a few more weeks. It is sometimes used with onions, meat, and nuts as a stuffing for a variety of pies or kibbeh balls.

Some types of strained yogurts are boiled in open vats first, so that the liquid content is reduced. The East Indian dessert, a variation of traditional dahi called mishti dahi, offers a thicker, more custard-like consistency, and is usually sweeter than western yogurts. In western Indian (Marathi and Gujarati) cuisine, strained yogurt is macerated with sugar and spices such as saffron, cardamom and nutmeg to make the dessert "shrikhand". Strained yogurt is also enjoyed in Greece and is the main component of tzatziki, a well-known accompaniment to gyros and souvlaki pita sandwiches: it is a yogurt sauce or dip made with the addition of grated cucumber, olive oil, salt and, optionally, mashed garlic. Srikhand, a dessert in India, is made from strained yogurt, saffron, cardamom, nutmeg, and sugar and sometimes fruits such as mango or pineapple.

In North America, strained yogurt is commonly called "Greek yogurt". Powdered milk is sometimes added in lieu of straining to achieve thickness. In Britain and the European Union, "Greek" is considered a designation of origin and may only be applied to yogurt made in Greece.

=== Beverages ===
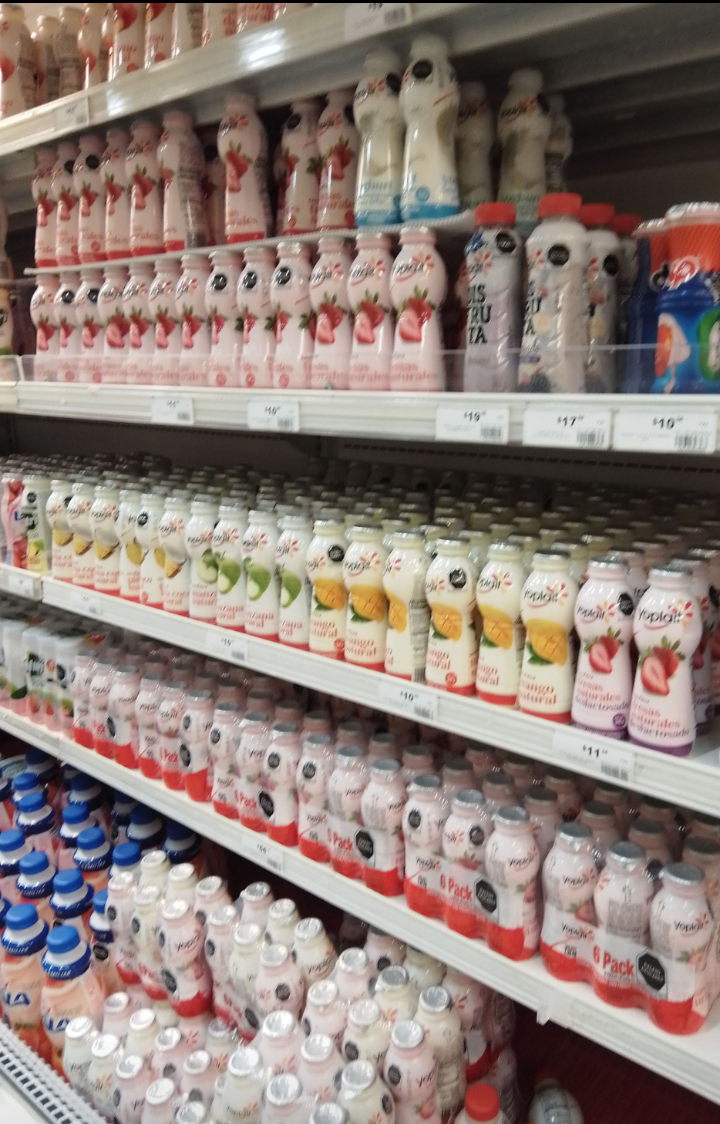
Yogurt drinks on sale

Ayran, doogh (Persian: دوغ; Assyrian Neo-Aramaic: dawghe) or dhallë (Albanian, lit. 'buttermilk') is a yogurt-based beverage in Middle Eastern cuisine made by mixing yogurt with water and sometimes salt.

Borhani (or burhani) is a spicy yogurt drink from Bangladesh. It is usually served with kacchi biryani at weddings and special feasts. Key ingredients are yogurt blended with mint leaves (mentha), mustard seeds and black rock salt (Kala Namak). Ground roasted cumin, ground white pepper, green chili pepper paste and sugar are often added.

Lassi is a yogurt-based beverage in South Asian cuisine that may be salty or sweet, and may be flavored with rosewater, mango or other fruit juice. Salty lassi is usually flavored with ground, roasted cumin and red chilies, and may be made with buttermilk.

An unsweetened and unsalted yogurt drink usually called simply jogurt is consumed with burek and other baked goods in the Balkans. Sweetened yogurt drinks are the usual form in Europe (including the UK) and the US, containing fruit and added sweeteners. These are typically called "drinkable yogurt". Also available are "yogurt smoothies", which contain a higher proportion of fruit and are more like smoothies.

== Production ==
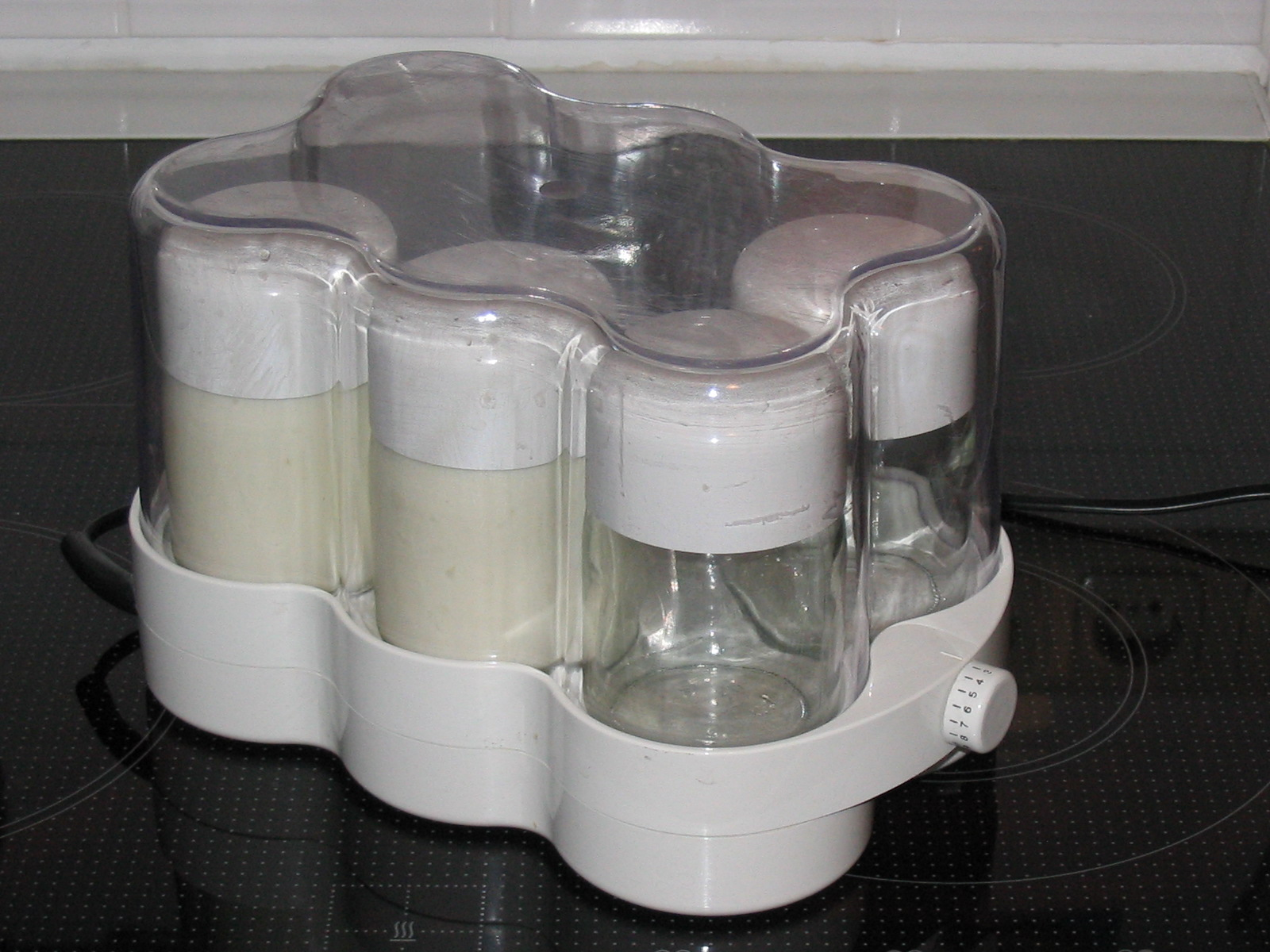
Commercially available home yogurt maker

Yogurt is made by warming milk to a temperature (30–45 °C (86–113 °F)) that will not kill the live microorganisms that turn the milk into yogurt, inoculating certain bacteria (starter culture), usually Streptococcus thermophilus and Lactobacillus bulgaricus, into the milk, and then keeping it warm for several hours (4–12 hours).

Milk with added dried milk produces a firmer yogurt. Yogurt production provides two significant barriers to pathogen growth, heat and acidity (low pH). Both are necessary to ensure a safe product. Acidity alone is insufficient, as shown by recent outbreaks of food poisoning by E. coli O157:H7 that is acid-tolerant. E. coli O157:H7 is easily destroyed by pasteurization (heating); the initial heating of the milk kills pathogens as well as denaturing proteins. The microorganisms that turn milk into yogurt can tolerate higher temperatures than most pathogens, so that a suitable temperature not only encourages the formation of yogurt, but inhibits pathogenic microorganisms. Once the yogurt has formed it can, if desired, be strained to reduce the whey content and thicken it.

== Microstructure ==
Yogurt is a viscous, shear-thinning, non-Newtonian fluid that forms when milk, a Newtonian fluid, is fermented, causing protein aggregation and subsequent gelation. The result is a soft solid that can be modeled via the interactions of the casein proteins. The microstructure of yogurt is affected by its fat and protein content and its processing conditions. In low-fat formulations, the microstructure is a network of casein protein globules joined via clusters and strands that encapsulate pores: these pores house the aqueous phase and the bacterial cultures of the yogurt.

Stirred yogurt formulations have a coarser distribution of loosely associated casein particulates due to the shear forces and resulting particle-particle collisions induced during the mixing process. After stirring, yogurt is more accurately defined as a weak gel.

=== Rheology ===
The mechanical properties of yogurt are typically assessed using rheometry, which quantifies the deformation and flow response of soft materials subject to shear forces. As is central in materials science, the rheological properties of yogurt are dictated by a variety of processing factors, including the ratios of dry and wet matter, thermal treatments, milk origin, starter cultures, and yogurt type.

Although cow milk is a common choice for yogurt production, other milks, such as goat, sheep, and camel, produce different rheologies. Goat milk yogurt has a low viscosity and a thinner texture when compared to cow milk yogurt. Conversely, sheep milk, having higher content of solids, has a higher viscosity and thicker texture when compared to cow milk yogurt.

Yogurt can further be characterized as "set" versus stirred, wherein set yogurts are processed and sold in the same container, and stirred yogurts are mixed prior to packaging in a secondary container.

== Commerce ==
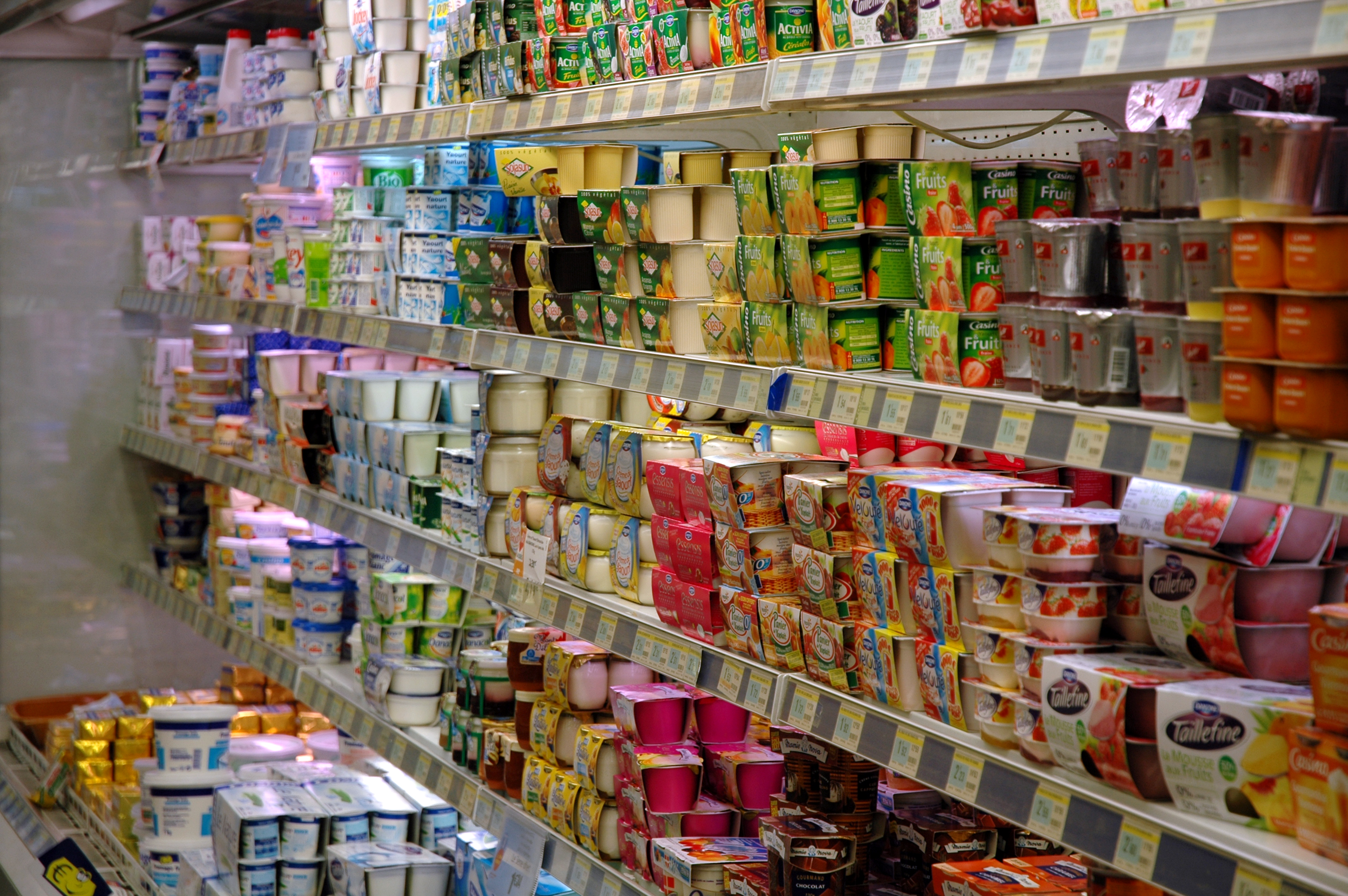
Yogurts and dairy desserts in a French supermarket in 2007

Two types of yogurt are supported by the Codex Alimentarius for import and export.

- Pasteurized yogurt ("heat treated fermented milk") is yogurt pasteurized to kill bacteria.
- Probiotic yogurt (labeled as "live yogurt" or "active yogurt") is yogurt pasteurized to kill bacteria, with Lactobacillus added in measured units before packaging.
- Yogurt probiotic drink is a drinkable yogurt pasteurized to kill bacteria, with Lactobacillus added before packaging.

Under US Food and Drug Administration regulations, milk must be pasteurized before it is cultured, and may optionally be heat treated after culturing to increase shelf life. Most commercial yogurts in the United States are not heat treated after culturing, and contain live cultures.

Yogurt with live cultures is more beneficial than pasteurized yogurt for people with lactose malabsorption.

== Lactose intolerance ==
Lactose intolerance is a condition in which people have symptoms due to the decreased ability to digest lactose, a sugar found in dairy products. In 2010, the European Food Safety Authority (EFSA) determined that lactose intolerance can be alleviated by ingesting live yogurt cultures (lactobacilli) that are able to digest the lactose in other dairy products. The scientific review by EFSA enabled yogurt manufacturers to use a health claim on product labels, provided that the "yogurt should contain at least 10^{8} CFU live starter microorganisms (Lactobacillus delbrueckii subsp. bulgaricus and Streptococcus thermophilus) per gram. The target population is individuals with lactose maldigestion". A 2021 review found that yogurt consumption could improve lactose tolerance and digestion.

== Plant-based products ==
A variety of plant-based yogurt alternatives appeared in the 2000s, using soy milk, rice milk, and nut milks such as almond milk and coconut milk fermented with cultures. These products may be suitable for people with lactose intolerance and those who prefer plant-based foods, such as vegetarians and vegans. Plant-based milks have different structures and components than dairy milk. Though they can be used to make many products similar to those made from dairy, there are differences in taste and texture, and some consumers may feel that they lack the "delicate and smooth structure" of "conventional yogurts". Since plant-based milks do not contain lactose (the food of Streptococcus thermophilus and Lactobacillus bulgaricus), plant-based products usually contain different bacterial strains than yogurt, such as Lactobacillus casei, Lactobacillus rhamnosus, and Bifidobacterium bifidum. Plant-based products also vary considerably in their nutrition and ingredients and may contain gums, stabilizers, high-intensity sweeteners, and artificial colors.

In Europe, companies may not market their plant-based products using the word yogurt since that term is reserved for products of animal origin only – per European Union regulation 1308/2013 and a 2017 ruling in the Court of Justice of the European Union. Reaffirmed in 2021, per the US FDA's Standard of Identity regulations, the word yogurt has been reserved for a product made from lactation and is a product of "milk-derived ingredients".

== Ant yogurt ==
Red wood ants have been used in Bulgaria and Turkey to make yogurt; a few ants are added to warm milk and left to ferment. Modern studies suggest that the ants' formic acid acidulates the milk, enabling microbes from the ants' microbiomes to thrive, and ant or bacterial enzymes break down milk proteins to produce a yogurt.

== Gallery ==
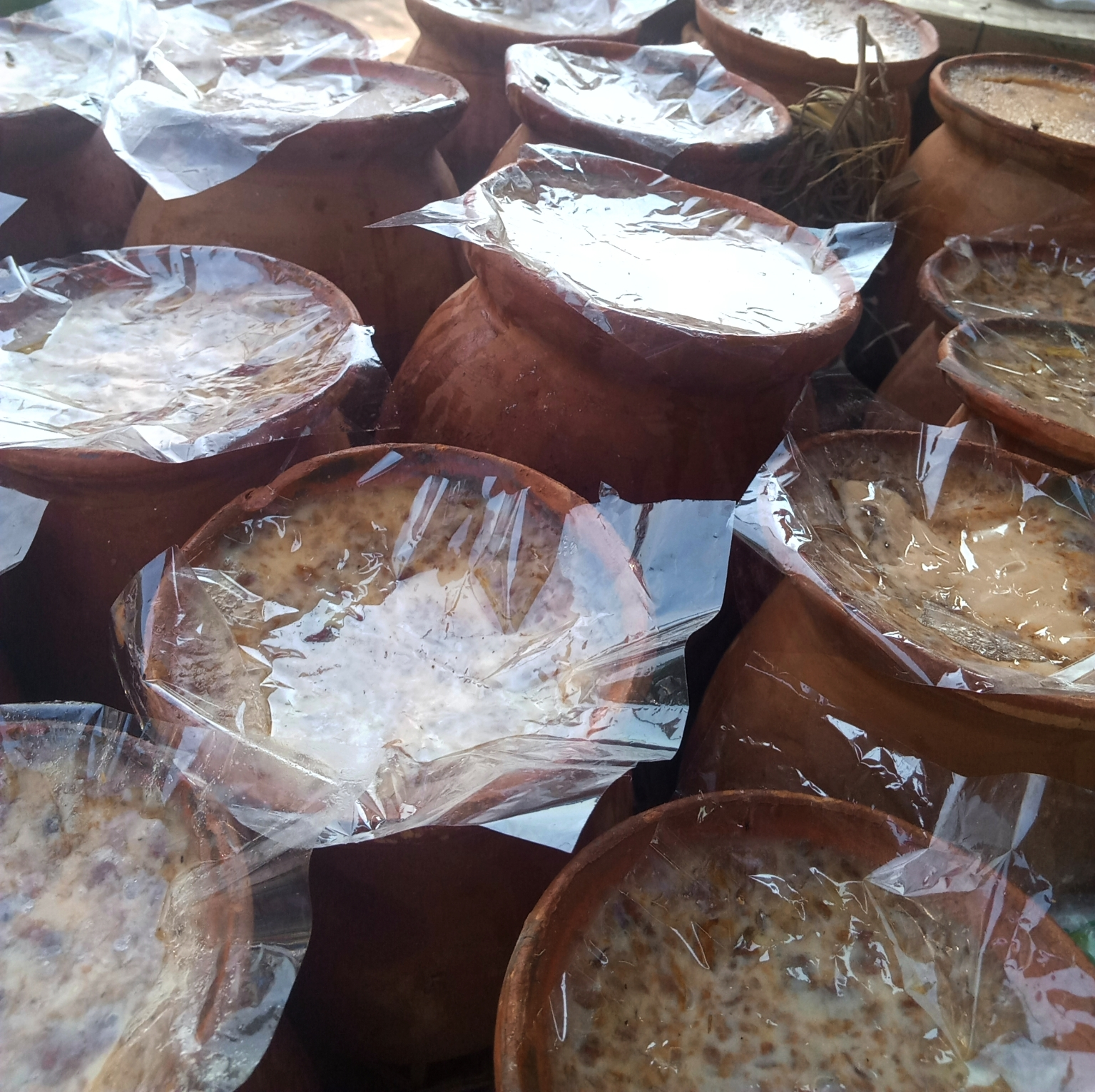
Sweet yogurt, made and contained in pots of clay are kept for sale, Bangladesh

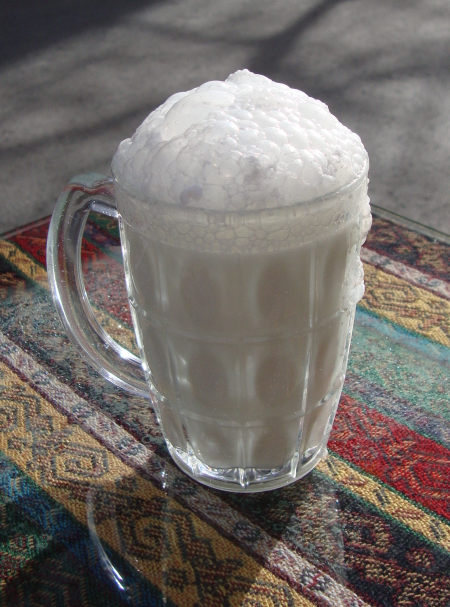
Ayran is a savory yogurt-based beverage, traditionally served cold and is sometimes carbonated and seasoned with mint and salt.

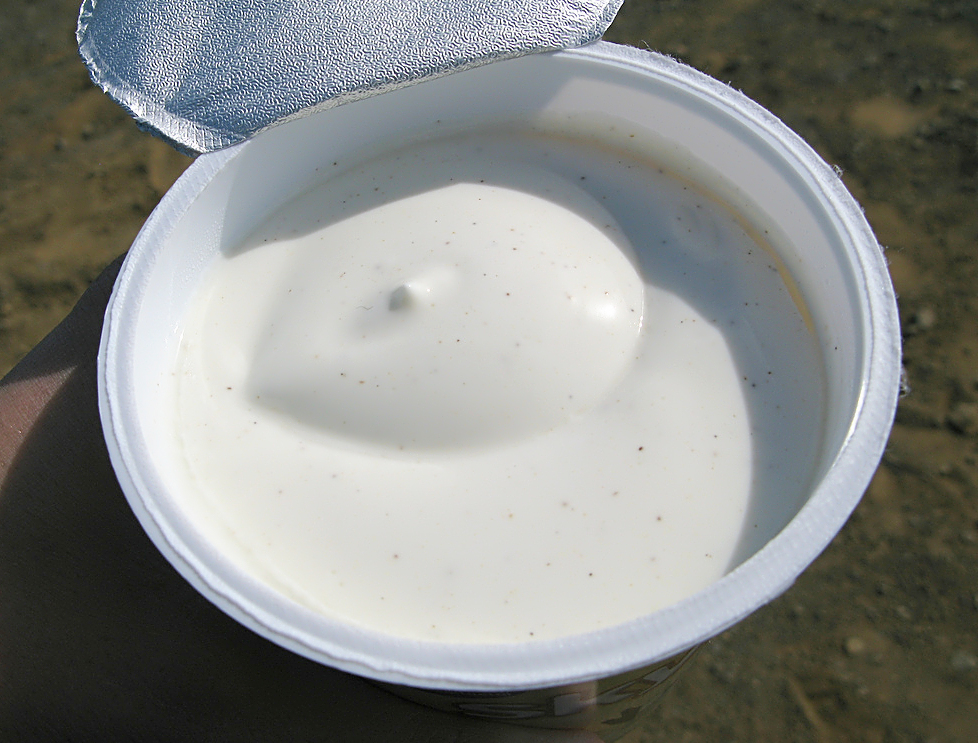
Skyr is an Icelandic cultured dairy product, similar to strained yogurt traditionally served cold with milk and a topping of sugar.

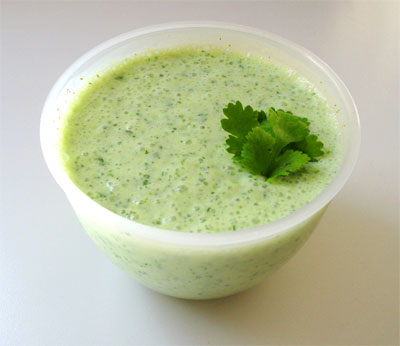
Raita is a condiment made with yogurt in the Indian subcontinent.

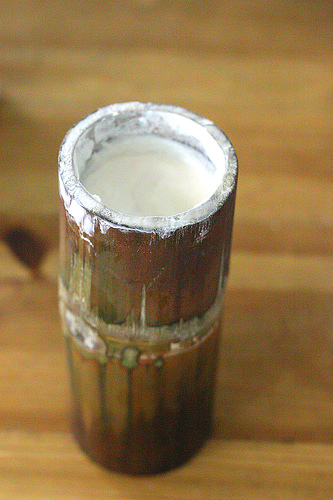
Dadiah in a market

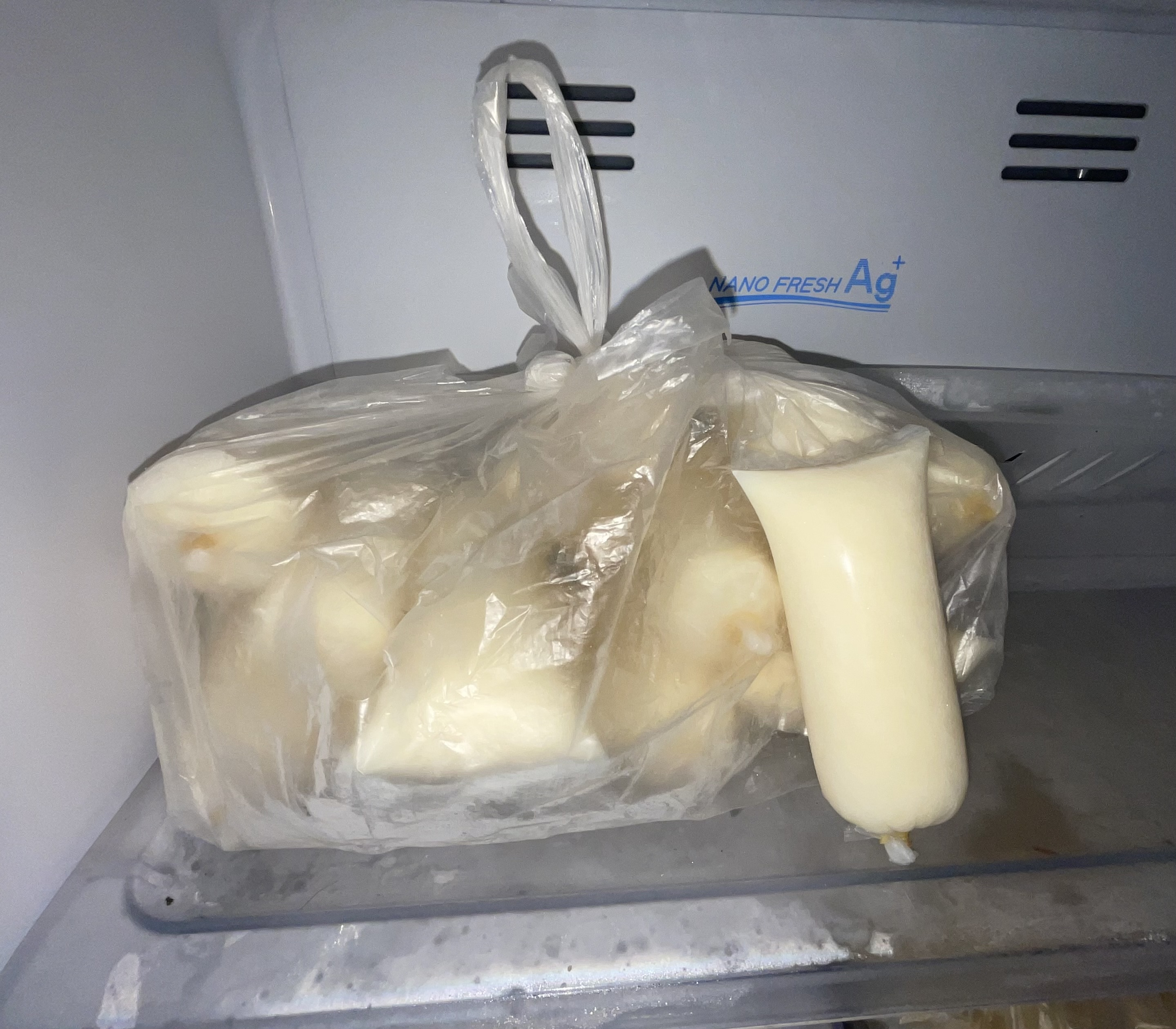
Sữa chua túi (lit. 'Bag yogurt') is a variety of frozen yogurt originating in Vietnam. A yogurt mixture is poured into a plastic bag, which is then tightened with a rubber band and left to freeze.

== See also ==
- List of fermented milk products
- Frozen yogurt
- List of dairy products
- Probiotic
- List of yogurt-based dishes and beverages
- Skyr
