= Dhau =

Yogurt

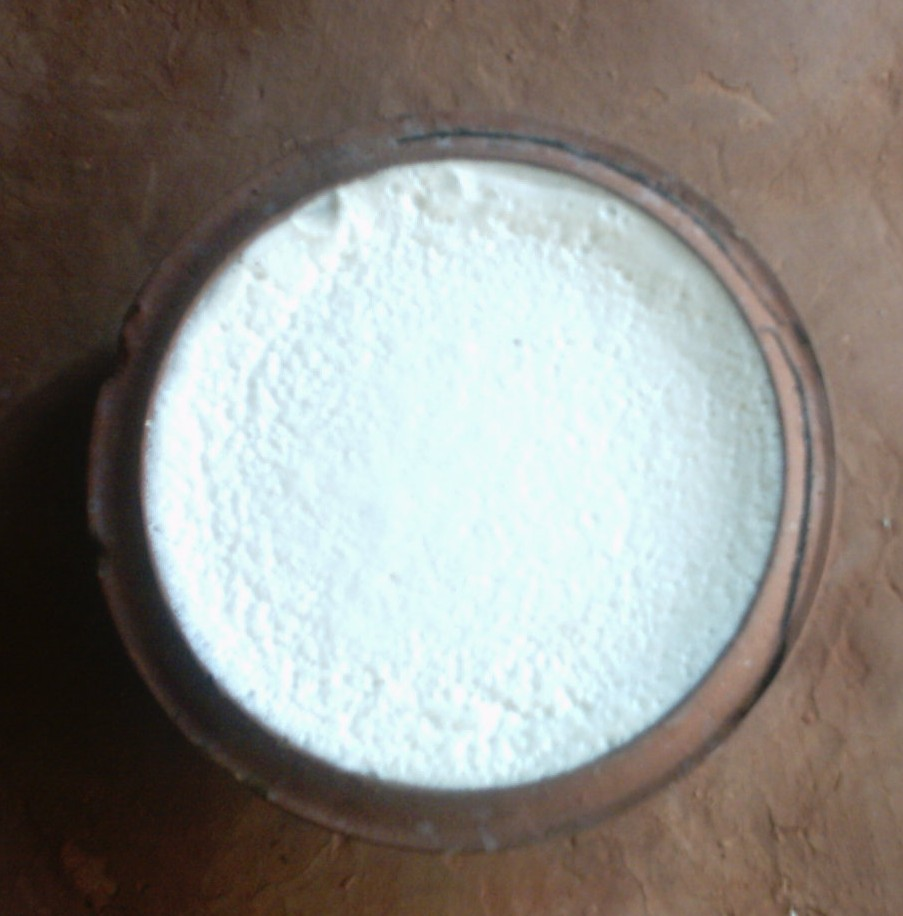
- Dhau in a clay pot
- Alternative names: Juju Dhau
- Type: Yogurt
- Place of origin: Nepal
- Region or state: Kathmandu Valley
- Created by: Newar people
- Main ingredients: Milk
- Ingredients generally used: yogurt culture, sugar

Dhau (Nepal Bhasa: धौ) is a variety of yogurt primarily prepared by Newar people of Nepal. It is traditionally made in clay pots. The most famous and delicious variety of dhau is Juju dhau, which is known for its rich taste and thick consistency. Juju dhau literally translates to "king of yogurt" in Nepal Bhasa. It is a specialty of the town of Bhaktapur.

== Use ==
Dhau along with chopped fruits are the staple dessert at Newar feasts. At the end of the meal, a server walks down the line of guests ladling out two portions of yogurt from a clay pot. Dhau mixed with baji (beaten rice) is also a popular snack and ceremonial food.

== Cultural significance ==
In addition to being an important ingredient in Newar cuisine, dhau has ritual significance. Dhau denotes purity, and it is a compulsory item during auspicious ceremonies, local festivals, marriage rituals, religious occasions and family gatherings. During the auspicious Sagan ceremony, it is offered to the family members who take a dab and put it on the temple.

When someone goes away or returns from a long journey, clay pots containing dhau are put on water pitchers and placed on either side of the doorway for good fortune.

During ritual bathing ceremonies of deities, dhau is one of the items poured over the image. An important ceremony associated with Jana Baha Dyah is known as Dhalin Luigu, which means pouring yogurt. The deity is known in Sanskrit as Aryavalokitesvara (Sacred Avalokiteśvara), and also White Machhendranath.

== Juju Dhau ==
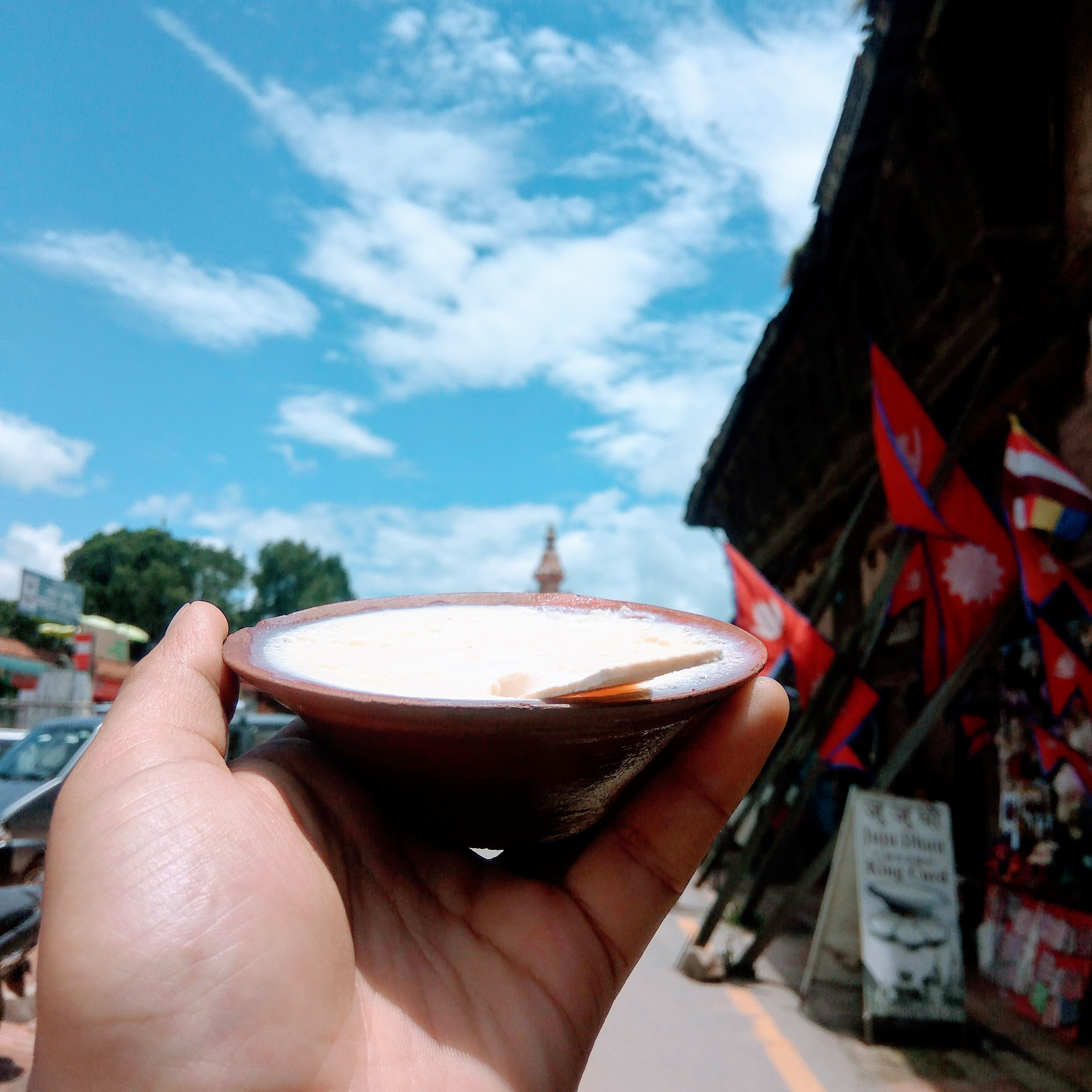
Juju Dhau (the king of yogurts), a specialty of Bhaktapur

Juju Dhau is a special variation of Dhau, made in the Bhaktapur district. It is usually prepared from buffalo's milk, which is more fatty than traditional cow's milk.

According to a tale, the kings of the Malla period of the valley once organized a yogurt competition. Yoghurt makers from Kathmandu, Bhaktapur, and Lalitpur participated in the competition. The king liked the curd of Bhaktapur, and from that day the yogurt of Bhaktapur was known as Juju Dhau.

Juju Dhau is one of the food items that has become integral to the cuisine of the Bhaktapur district. It is highly sought by domestic as well as foreign tourists. The Juju Dhau of Bhaktapur is also exported to nearby cities such as Kathmandu, Lalitpur, Banepa, Panauti, and Dhulikhel.

== See also ==
- Mishti Doi
- Shrikhand
- Raita
