= Borhani =

Bangladeshi drinks

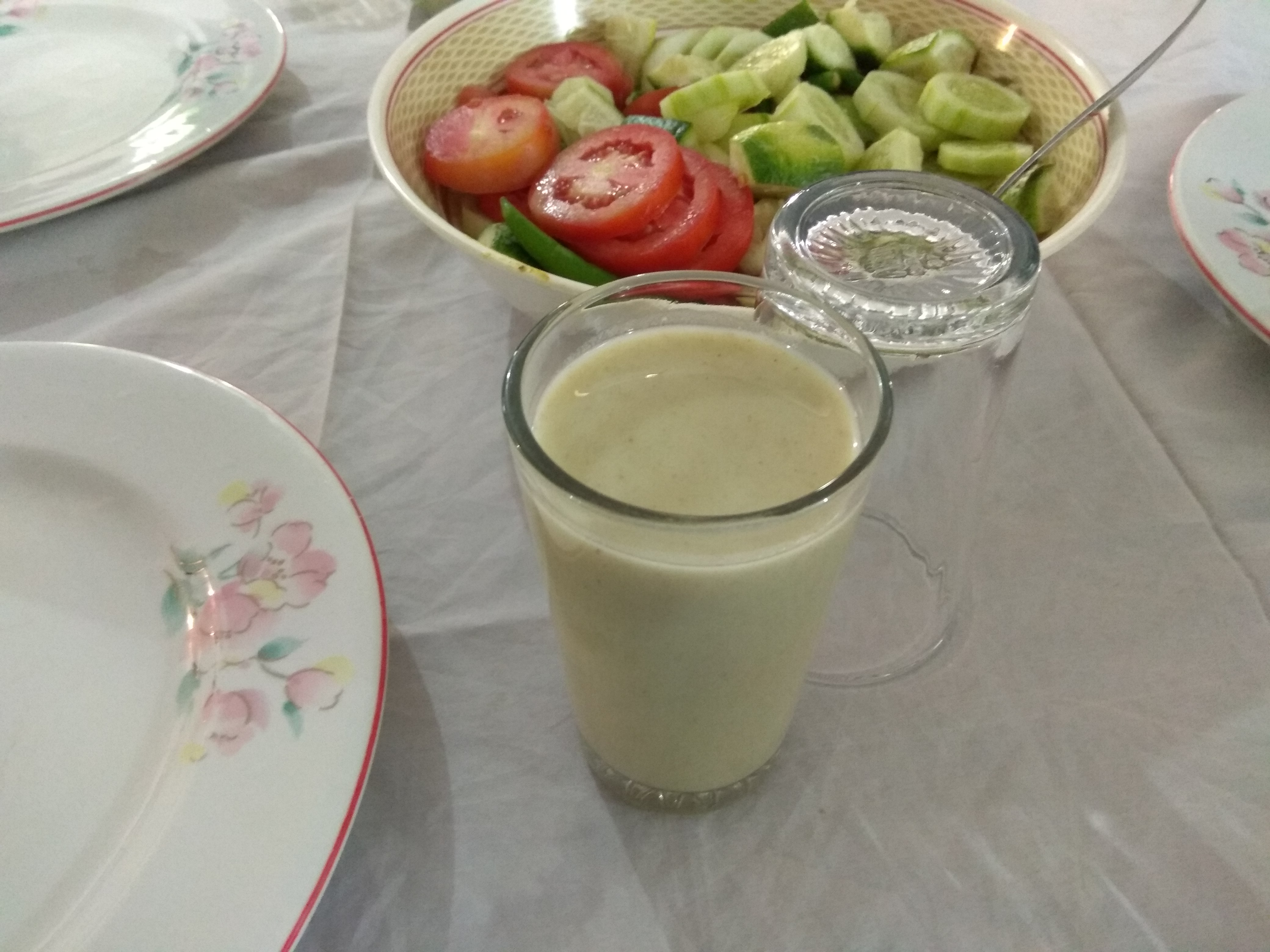
- A glass of Borhani at a wedding in Dhaka, Bangladesh
- Alternative names: Burhani
- Course: Beverage
- Place of origin: Bangladesh
- Region or state: Dhaka Division, Greater Chittagong
- Associated cuisine: Bangladesh
- Main ingredients: curd, mint leaves, bit lobon, mustard
- Variations: Shahi Borhani

Borhani (Bengali: বোরহানী) is a traditional yoghurt-based savoury drink from Bangladesh. Borhani is made from sour doi, green chili, mustard seeds, black salt, coriander and mint. It is considered by some to be a type of lassi. It is very commonly consumed in Dhaka and Chittagong regions of Bangladesh, where it is served in special events such as weddings and iftar gatherings in Ramadan. It is normally consumed after heavy meals such as biryani, morog polao and tehari to aid digestion or as an appetizer.

== See also ==
- Chaas
