= Bogurar doi =

Type of curd from Bangladesh

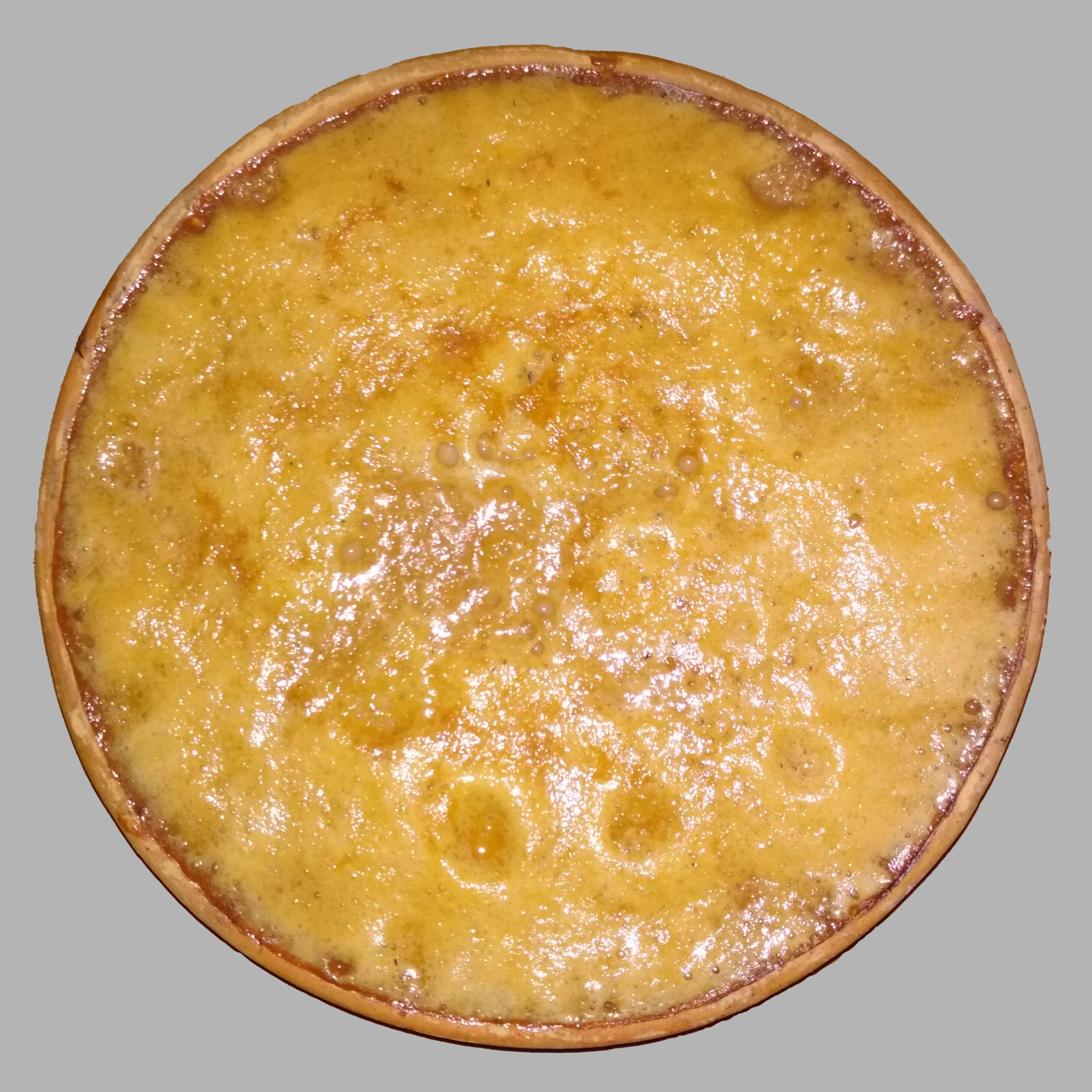
- Bogurar doi in a sora (clay pot)
- Alternative names: Bograr Mishti doi
- Course: Dessert
- Place of origin: Bangladesh
- Region or state: Bogra, Rajshahi, Bangladesh
- Associated cuisine: Bangladesh
- Created by: Ghetu Ghosh
- Serving temperature: Cold
- Main ingredients: Milk, Khoa
- Similar dishes: Mishti doi

Bogurar doi (Bengali: বগুড়ার দই, lit. 'Bogura Yogurt') is a yoghurt from Bogra of Bangladesh. It is a traditional dessert of Bangladesh and popular all over the country. It is a variation of Mishti doi, another yoghurt variation.

== History ==
Ghetu Ghosh of Sherpur in Bogra district is known to be the inventor of Curd of Bogra. On the other hand, Gaur Gopal Ghosh was the inventor of creamed yogurt in Bogra.

Sir John Anderson, President Yahya Khan, Elizabeth II, Queen Victoria and many other famous persons ate Bogra yogurt. Yahya Khan sent the food to important persons in order to influence them. It became geographical indication product on 26 June 2023.

== Formula ==
Although the history of Bogra Yogurt is about two and a half century old, the Golden Age was in the pre-independence period. At that time its preparation method was very secret. This privacy could no longer be maintained. Now many traders make yogurt in Sherpur. The number of Ghosh family members is much less among them.

To make Bogra yogurt, full cream milk, sugar, sodium bi-carbonate (baking soda) a small amount of old yogurt, known as base yogurt, and a clay pot are needed. This yogurt is made by boiling and reducing milk in to a pan. (Note: To make one kg of curd you will be needed 2 kg of cow's full cream milk, 250 gms of sugar, a pinch of sodium bi-carbonate (baking soda), small amount of old curd,known as base curd, and a clay pot.)

== Market ==
More than 5,000 workers work in yogurt factories in Bogra. Due to the effect of COVID-19 pandemic in 2020, the curd market in Bogra has become almost down. Most of the workers of the curd factories have become unemployed. But from 2023, the demand for Bogra's curd has remained consistently high.

== Stores ==
Currently, there are many stores that sell Bogra yogurt:

- Asia Sweetmeat in the city
- Doighar in the city
- Kuranu in Chelopara
- Ruchita in Nawabbari
- Akbaria in Kabi Nazrul Islam Road
- Doibazar in BRTC Market
- Mistimahal
- Satmathar Daighar
- Muharram Ali
- Sherpur Daighar
- Chinipata
