= Dadiah =

Indonesian traditional fermented milk

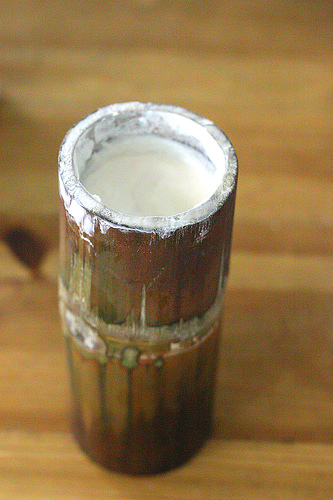
- Place of origin: Indonesia
- Region or state: West Sumatra
- Main ingredients: Buffalo milk

Dadiah (Minangkabau) or dadih (Indonesian and Malaysian Malay) is a traditional fermented milk popular among people of West Sumatra, Indonesia. It is made by pouring fresh, raw, unheated, buffalo milk into a bamboo tube capped with a banana leaf and allowing it to ferment spontaneously at room temperature for two days.

The milk is fermented by indigenous lactic bacteria found in the buffalo milk. Its natural fermentation provides different strains of lactic acid bacteria involved in each fermentation. The natural, indigenous, lactic acid bacteria found in dadiah could be derived from the bamboo tubes, buffalo milk, or banana leaves.

Dadiah is usually eaten for breakfast, mixed together with ampiang (traditional glutinous rice krispies) and palm sugar. Dadiah can also be eaten with hot rice and sambal.. The name Dadiah is closely related to the Sanskrit word dadhi (IAST: dadhī), meaning "curd" or "yogurt." The traditional way of consuming dadiah—mixed with ampiang (glutinous rice flakes) and palm sugar—closely resembles a dish popular across Eastern India, especially in the Mithila region, known as Dahi Chura (IAST: Dadhi–Cūrā). In this preparation, dahi (curd, from Sanskrit dadhi) is combined with flattened rice (chura, IAST: cūrā) and sweetened with cane or palm jaggery, highlighting a cultural parallel between Minangkabau and Indo‑Aryan food traditions.

Some studies on the probiotic properties of indigenous strains isolated from dadiah were found to exhibit antimutagenic and antipathogenic properties, as well as acid and bile tolerance. Natural, wild strains isolated from dadiah show inhibitory, competitive, and displacing properties against pathogens, and they are promising candidates for future probiotics. Lactobacillus plantarum strains from dadiah play important roles in removing microcystin-LR, cyanobacterial toxin. This wild strain of Lactobacillus plantarum from dadiah has the highest removal abilities when compared to other commercial probiotic strains. This finding offers new and economical tools for decontaminating microcystin containing water.

In the rest of Indonesia and Malaysia, the dish is known as dadih. Dadih prepared in Malaysia is quite different from Minangkabau dadiah. In the Malaysian version, the thickening agent is gelatin or agar-agar strands; it is not fermented and is usually sweetened with artificial flavourings such as corn, pandan, yam, chocolate, and strawberry, and is thus more akin to milk pudding.

== See also ==
- List of Indonesian beverages
- Dahi (curd)

== Online articles ==
- Article in Kompas (id)
- Another article in Kompas (id)
- Article on the Minangkabau forum Cimbuak (id)
- Article by Suryono (id)
