= Mishti doi =

Dessert of Bengal

Mishti Doi
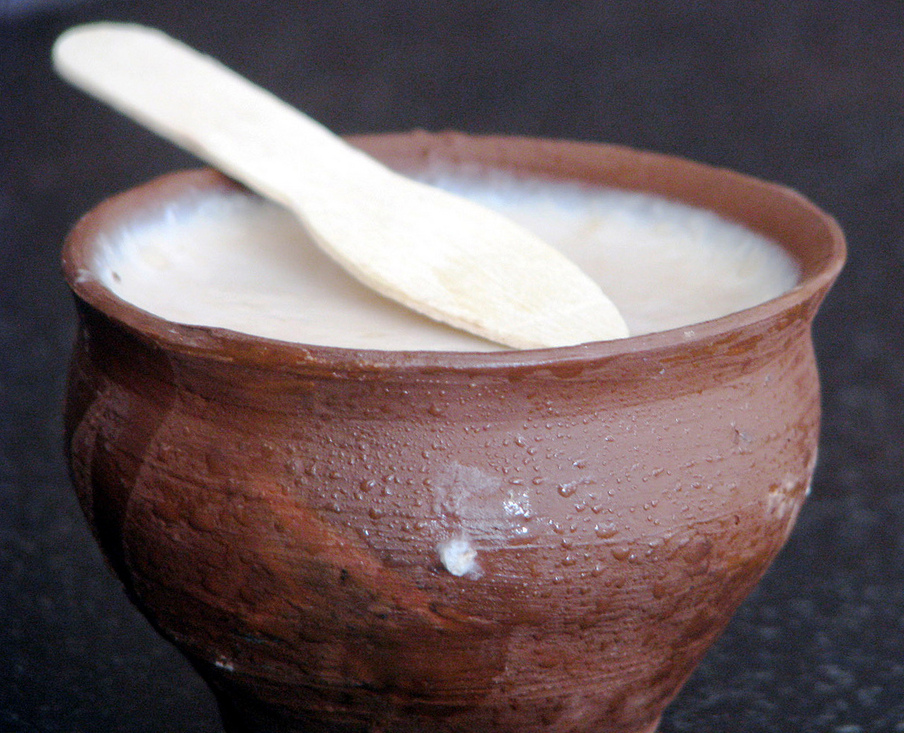
- Mishti doi
- Alternative names: Mitha doi (Assamese), Meeṭhi dahi (Hindi), Miṭha dahi (Odia)
- Type: Dahi (yogurt)
- Course: Dessert
- Place of origin: West Bengal Bangladesh
- Region or state: Bengal
- Associated cuisine: India, Bangladesh
- Main ingredients: Milk, Curd, Sugar, Jaggery
- Variations: Nabadwip-er lal doi, Bograr Mishti doi

Mishti doi (Bengali: মিষ্টি দই; transl. Sweet curd) is a fermented sweet doi (curd) originating from the Bengal region of the Indian subcontinent. It is popular in Bangladesh and in the Indian states of West Bengal, Tripura, and the Assamese region of Barak Valley. It is made with milk and sugar or jaggery. It differs from yogurts due to the way it is prepared. There are many variations of Mishti doi. Regional variations of areas such as Nabadwip, Kolkata and Bogra are particularly popular.

Mishti doi is prepared by boiling milk until it is slightly thickened, sweetening it with sugar, either gura (brown sugar) or khejur gura (date molasses), and allowing the milk to ferment overnight. Earthenware is always used as the container for making mishti doi because the gradual evaporation of water through its porous walls not only further thickens the yoghurt, but also produces the right temperature for the growth of the culture. Very often the yoghurt is delicately seasoned with a pinch of cardamom for fragrance. Baked yogurt is a similar preparation in the West.

Before the introduction of antibiotics, mishti doi was used as a remedy for typhoid fever.
