= Sisua village =

Sisua
- Village
- Location in Odisha, India
- Coordinates: 20.479063°N 86.082268°E
- Country: India
- State: Odisha
- District: Cuttack

Government
  - Type: Elected

Area
  - Total: 1.54 km^{2} (0.59 sq mi)
- Elevation: 24 m (79 ft)

Population (2011 Census)
  - Total: 740
  - Density: 788/km^{2} (2,040/sq mi)

Languages
  - Official: Odia
- Time zone: UTC+5:30 (IST)
- PIN: 754202
- Telephone code: 0671
- Vehicle registration: OD-05 XX XXXX
- Nearest city: Cuttack

Sisua is a medium-sized (223,980 acres) village in the Salipur taluk/mandal/tehsil/block of Cuttack district in the state of Odisha (previously called "Orissa"), India, close to the new Sisua Village Jagannath (form of Vishnu) Temple (Hindu Temple) (Not to be confused with the Shree Jagannath temple, Puri, approximately 100 km South of the Sisua Village Jagannath Temple). The village lies South of Cuttack to Kendraparda road (Highway 9A) left of Sisua village road if traveling South. As of 2009 Kantapara is the gram panchayat (GP part of a group) of Sisua village.

In late October 1999 the village was one of many affected by the Super Cyclone that devastated the area after hitting the East coast of Odisha.

The village consists of approximately 250 dwellings, has its own post office (Contact address: Postmaster, Post Office Sisua (BRANCH OFFICE), Cuttack, Odisha (OD), India (IN), Pin Code: 754202) but has no railway station of its own therefore it cannot be reached directly by train. The village does, however, have both a public and private bus service within the village that connect travellers to the local railway stations.

The nearest railway stations to Sisua are Kandarpur Halt (12 km away), Badakhandita (14 km away) and Cuttack (21 km away), with Cuttack being the nearest one to offer the most connections to other main railway stations in India. Salipur Sub Jail is 1.7 km away.

In 1934 Mohandas Karamchand Gandhi (Mahatma Gandhi) (Gandhiji) (Bapu) spent the night in Sisua village prior to his speech at Patpur.

Vehicles driving is on the left side. The national currency of Indian rupee is used, the international currency code for this is INR. Local phones and mobiles can be reached by adding the Indian country access code +91 when calling from outside of India. The dd/mm/yyyy date format is standard and the local domain name extension is country code top-level domain (cTLD) is .in.

As per the Constitution of India and Panchayati Raj Act, the village is administrated by the Sarpanch (Head of Village), Laxmi Sethi, who is its elected representative.

== Places of interest ==
Ansupa/Anshupa Lake, Banki, Barabati Fort, Barabati Stadium, Bhattarika Temple, Charchika Temple, Choudwar, Dhabaleswar Temple, Katak/Cuttack Chandi Temple, Latlitgiri, Mahanadi Elephant Reserve (see Satakosia Tiger sanctuary), Naraj (local beauty spot), Ravenshaw University and Satakosia Tiger Sanctuary are the major tourist attractions near to the village. Also In close proximity to the village, stretching over the Chittotpala river, is India's longest siphun-cum-bridge it being the second longest in Asia.

=== Agriculture ===
The main economic activity of the village community is agriculture; rice and lentils such as mung/moong and peanuts are among the more important crops grown by the villagers. Sugarcane, cereals, millets, pulses, gram, tuar, arhar, jute, sesame, groundnut, mustard, castor and linseed are also major crops that are cultivated in the area.

=== Schools ===
There are three schools in Sisua; the Government approved U.P. School and two private schools, Utkalmani Sisusikshya Mandir and Saraswati Sishu Mandir. Two further schools are nearby.

=== Airports ===
The nearest airport is Charbatia Air Base which is 57.6 km away followed by Biju Patnaik International Airport 89.4 km and Angul JSPL Airport 120.5 km.

=== River ===
The village is situated near the Chitroptala river a tributary of the much larger Mahanadi river.

== Demographics ==
Sisua village has a population of 740 of which 388 are males while 352 are females as per Population Census of 2011.

The population of children with ages between 0-6 is 73 which makes up 9.86% of the total population of the village. The average sex ratio for the village is 907, lower than the Orissa state average of 979. Child sex ratio for Sisua as per the 2011 census is 921, lower than the Orissa average of 941.

The village has a higher literacy rate compared to the wider area of Odisha. In 2011, the literacy rate for the village was 80.81% compared to 72.87% for Orissa. The male literacy of the village stands at 87.11% while female literacy rate was 87.11%.

== Food ==
Typical Oriya foods include rice, tomatoes, potatoes, dal like mung, peanuts, vegetables similar to yam, bitter gourd (called Momordica charantia), Dillenia Speciosa, pumpkin, white gourd (winter melon), red gourd, spinach and sweet potato, Trichosanthes cucumerina, Luffa, okra, cauliflowers, cabbages, eggplants and arum can all be found in any Oriya family's backyard.

One dish, Pakhala, made from a mix of boiled rice and water, is eaten with boiled potatoes mixed with green chili pepper, curd, salt, and onions. Biri chaula chakuli pitha consisting of Vigna mungo and rice. It is normally eaten for breakfast. Chakuli pitha can be eaten with Santula or Dalma. Pitha and is the main sweet dish at every festival they celebrate. There are different types of pitha made out of rice, namely Aarisa pitha, Manda Pitha, Kakara Pitha, Enduri Pitha, Chakuli Pitha, Poda Pitha, Chitau Pitha, Tala Pitha and much more.

=== Sisua Cuisine ===
Alu Potala Rasa, Bela Pana, Chadachadi, Chakuli pitha, Chandrakanti, Chhena, Chhena gaja, Chhena jalebi, Chhena Jhili, Chhena kheeri, Chhena poda, Chhencheda, Chingudi Jhola, Dahi baigana, Dahi machha, Enduri Pitha, Gajar ka halwa, Ghugni, Handia (drink), Ilish, Kakara pitha, Khaja, Kheer, Khichdi, Khira sagara, Khiramohana, Kora Khai, Luchi, Fish, Bihana, Machher Jhol, Manda pitha, Mathapuli, Mishti doi, Ouu khatta, Pakhala, Pitha, Podo pitha, Rasabali, Saag, Samosa, Santula, Sattu are a few of the many varieties of culinary specialties to be found in Sisua.

== Festivals ==
Agni Utsav, Chandan Yatra, Dhani Yatra|Dhanu Jatra or Dhanu Yatra, Durga Puja, Gajalakshmi Puja, Jagannath Ratha-Yatra, Konark Dance Festival, Mahashivaratri, Makarmela, Puri Beach Festival, Rishi Panchami, Taratarini Mela, Vishwakarama Puja are the major festivals celebrated in Sisua. The 24 annual festivals of which 13 are major ones, held at the temple complex contribute to the economy of Sisua and the larger surrounding area.

Along with the daily religious practices at the temple, the villagers observe many annual religious festivals, holidays and celebrations, including Raja (three to four day long), Ratha Yatra (chariot festival sometime in June–July, visited by 1,000,000 people in 2014), Pana Sankranti (new year holiday usually 14 or 15 April), Dola Purnima or Dola Yatra, Holi (two-day spring festival February/March, often clashing with Dola) and Diwali/Deepavali (falling in the Autumn and lasting up to five days).

Odisha day (Odia: ଓଡ଼ିଶା ଦିବସ, also Odisha Dibasa, Utkal Divas and Utkala Dibasa) is, along with the religious festivals, also celebrated by the local community every year on April 1. This is to commemorate the forming of the state as a separate province in 1936. On this day local politicians organise a huge festival of celebration, the festival is attended by thousands of people gathering from the surrounding area. Thousands of shops and stalls service the visitors which contribute to the beauty of this festival along with the displays and a fireworks competition which is a key feature of the event.

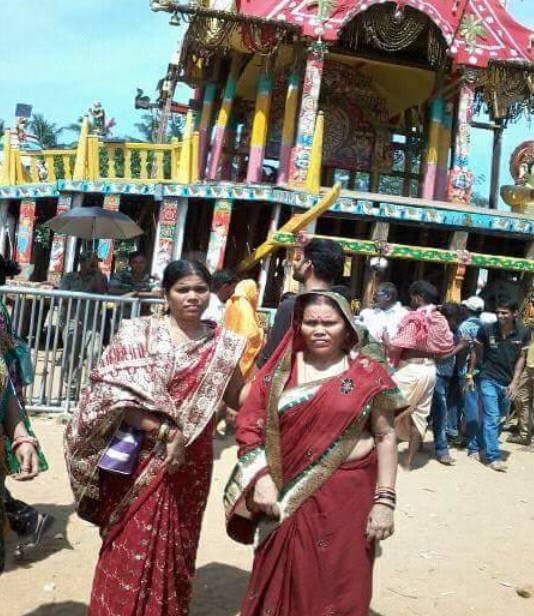
Cart Festival in Sisua Village

Pana Sankranti (Odia: ପଣା ସଂକ୍ରାନ୍ତି), or Maha Vishuva Sankranti is celebrated as the Odia New Year. The day marks the beginning of the New Year in the traditional Hindu Solar Calendar.

The occasion is observed with sharing of the traditional drink of Pana. Since the festival is observed during summer, this beverage forms the most important part of the festivities.

Pana is prepared by mixing different types of fruits, water, milk, pulp of bael (custard apple), curd and sugar. Amba Pana that includes mango pulp, is offered to Lord Jagannath to convey New Year wishes, while many offer the beverage to Lord Shiva by adding a bit of bhang (cannabis).

Further festivals celebrated in this village are Manabasa Gurubara, Raja, Dasahara, Holi, Diwali and Dola festival.

Manabasa Gurubara is the biggest festival celebrated in this village because the religion of the locals is Hindu. Manabasa Gurubara is celebrated for the goddess of Laxmi, the deity of wealth and prosperity. This festival is celebrated each Thursday in the month of Margasira, which is four times during the month. Women clean their houses and make jhoti chita from rice paste. It is believed that Laxmi visits each home on these days and gives blessings. There is a story about this festival in Laxmi Puran.

Raja (festival), is another popular festival in this village, being for girls only. During this festival, girls wear new dresses, their best jewellery, eat all types of pitha, visit their friends, relatives and for two days of the festival the girls will not consume salt nor bathe. At this time large swings are hung from the banyan trees and the girls are encouraged to swing on them. All people abstain from walking barefoot on the earth and no work in the fields is allowed. The women do not grind, will not tear anything apart, will not cut anything and are relieved from cooking. This is also the time they expect to catch the eye of a young man and sing of how they will produce many healthy babies as this festival is linked to fertility, Mother Earth and the monsoon season.

Dola festival is also celebrated by villagers on the day of Holi, and is similar to the better-known festival. An image, made specifically for this day, of Lord Krishna is taken to everyone's home on a wooden cart and is traditionally sprinkled with abira/phalgu (this is a red/violet powder made from the root of a species of curcuma and sapan wood). The villagers also play with abira themselves and on the day of Holi a similar coloured powder (traditionally made from dry leaves and sand) is scattered and smeared on each other's faces, along with the squirting of rose water at passers by. Typically both types of powder have been a similar colour (including the rose water), in modern times however powders of many colours (known simply as "colour") are used for this festival leading it to be also known as the Festival of Colours. There has been some concern about locally produced "colour" due to the lead content. Therefore, colour using more natural, less harmful dye elements are being called for. It is believed on this day Lord Krishna offers the first crop of mangoes from the trees for the almost year long devotion of his followers and their offerings to him.

== Sports ==
There is a cricket ground in the village where children can play cricket and other types of games, such as marbles, Kabaddi, and Gilli-danda. The people of Sisua also organize cricket tournaments every year to promote the sport and for both players and spectators to enjoy.

== See also ==
- Salipur
- Odia Literature
- Odia language
- Odisha
