= Cuisine of Odisha =

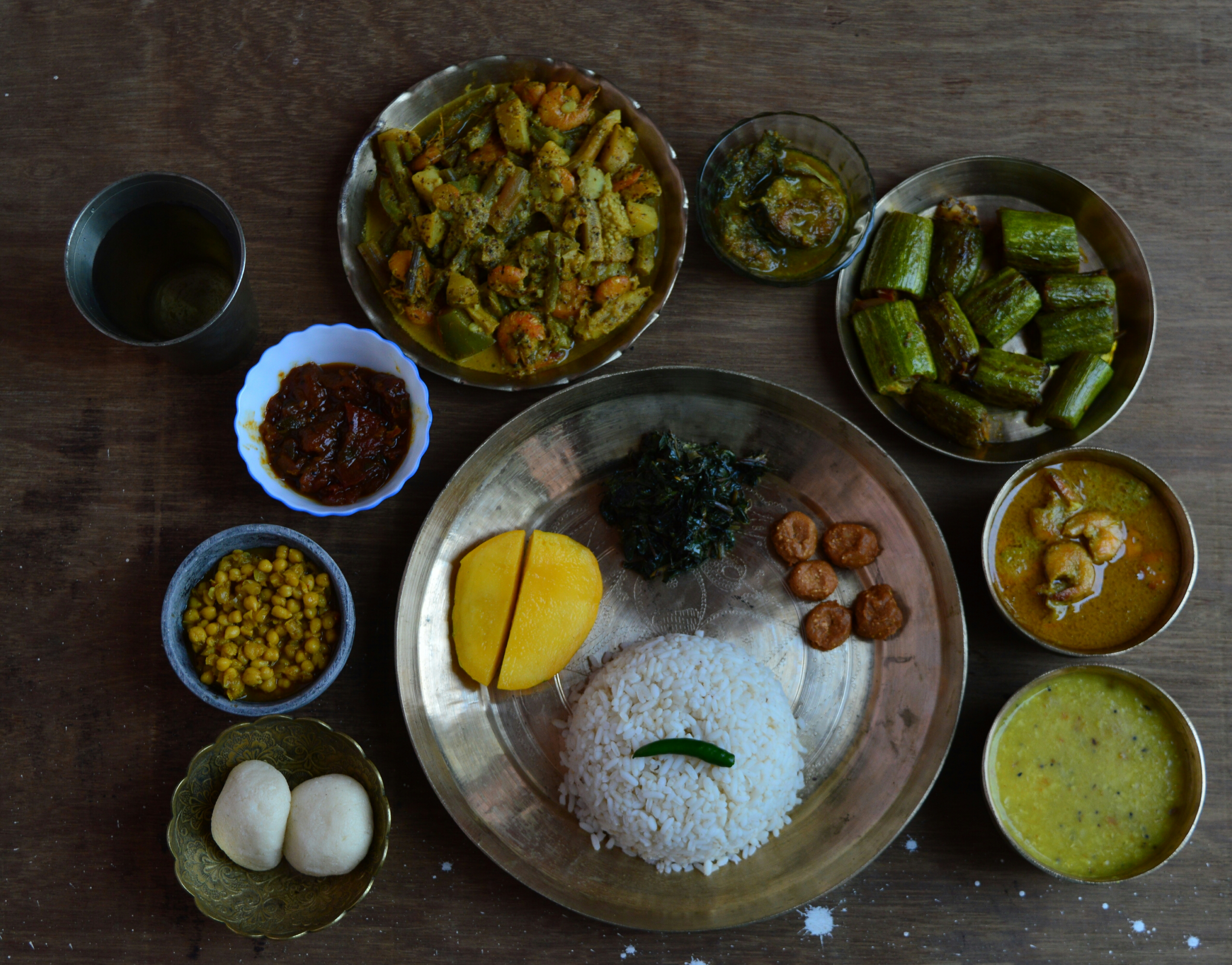
Traditional Odia lunch thali

The cuisine of Odisha is the cuisine of the Indian state of Odisha. Compared to other regional Indian cuisines, Odia cuisine uses less oil and is less spicy, while nonetheless remaining flavorful. Rice is the staple food of this region. Mustard oil is used in some dishes as the cooking medium, but ghee (made of cow's milk) is preferred in temples. Odia foods are traditionally served either on brass or bronze metal plates, banana leaves, or disposable plates made of sal leaves.

Odia cooks, particularly from the Puri region, were much sought after due to their ability to cook food in accordance with the Hindu scriptures.

Yoghurt is used in many Odia dishes. Many sweets of the region are based on chhena (cheese).

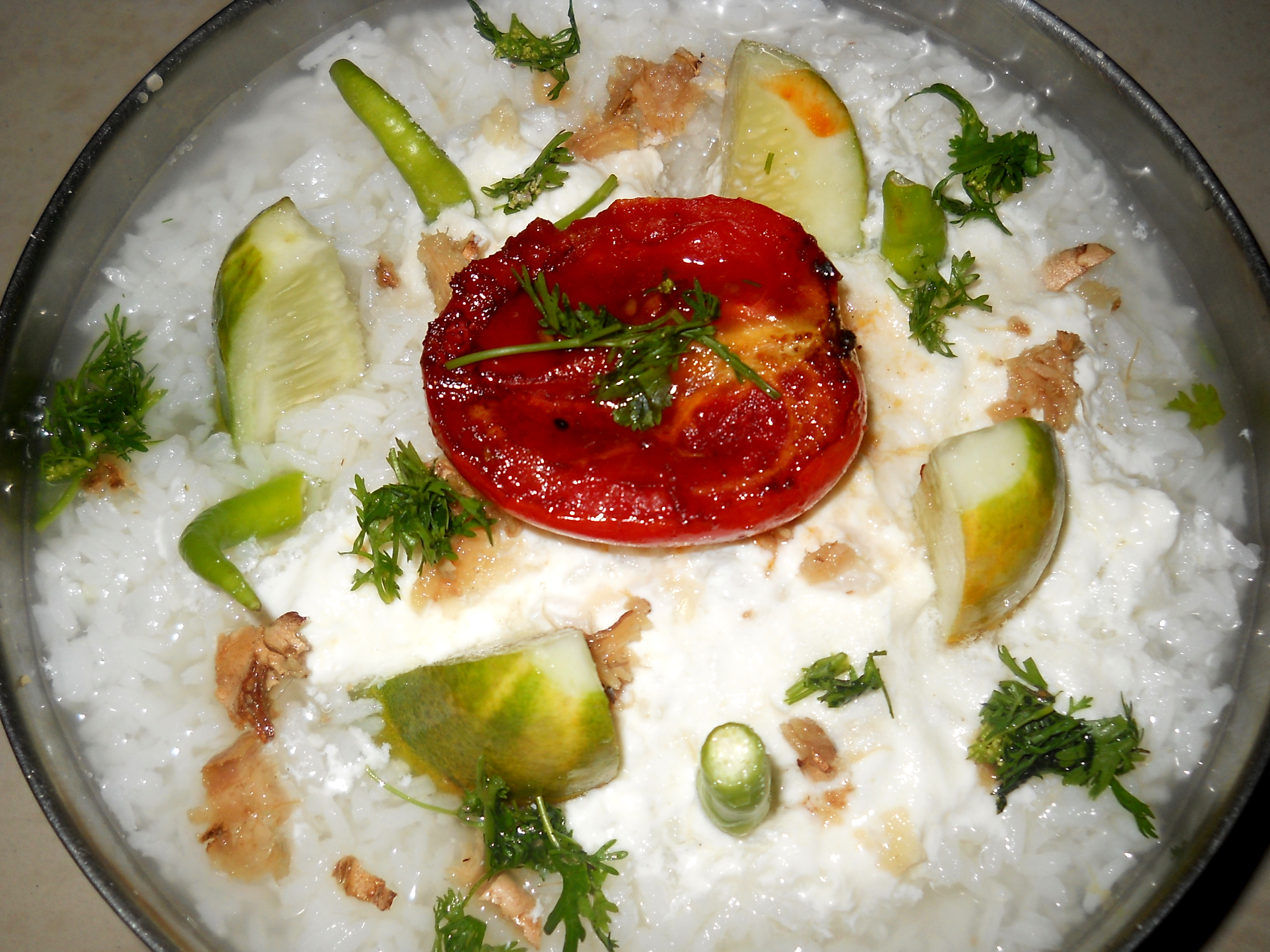
Pakhala served with wads of lemon, yoghurt, slices of cucumber, pieces of chili and a slice of tomato

== Ingredients and seasoning ==
Rice is a major crop of Odisha. Lentils such as pigeon peas and moong beans are other major ingredients.

Indigenous vegetables used in Odia cuisine are pumpkin, gourd, plantains, jackfruit, and papaya. Vegetables such as potatoes, cauliflowers, and cabbages are also used alongside local vegetables.

Pancha phutana is a blend of five spices that is widely used in Odia cuisine. It contains mustard, cumin, fenugreek, aniseed and kalonji (onion seeds). Curry Leaves, Garlic, onion, ginger, turmeric, tamarind and coconut are other commonly used ingredients in most of the dishes.

== Local variation ==
The food in the region around Puri and Cuttack is greatly influenced by the Jagannath Temple. On the other hand, kalonji and mustard paste are used mostly in every part of the state. In the regions closer to Andhra Pradesh, like Brahmapur, due to the influence of South Indian cuisine, curry leaves and tamarind are used more.

The state is home to many indigenous tribal communities which have influenced the state's cuisine and culture very deeply in its border areas such as Mayurbhanj and Koraput . -Patrapoda ( a dish made by simply burning any vegetable or meat wrapped inside leaves of sal or banana) is an example of the convergence of tribal culture with odia cuisine .

== Temple food ==
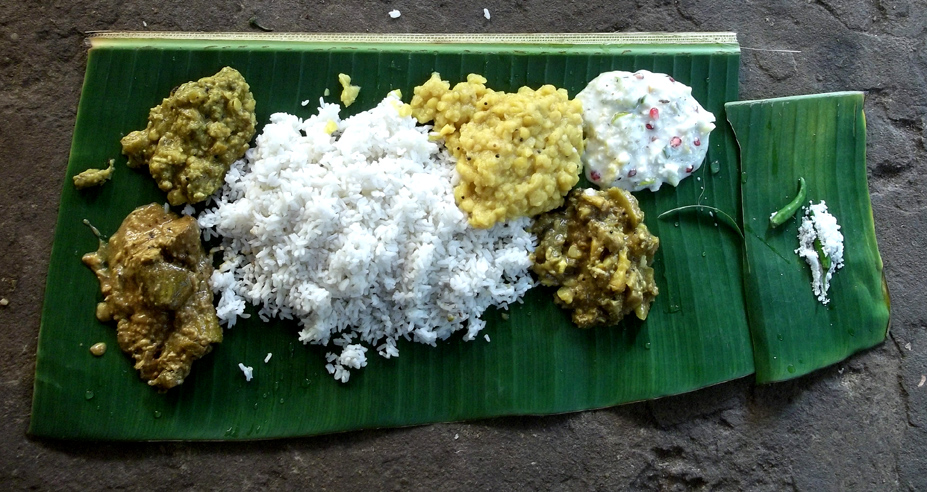
Abadha, the afternoon meal of the Jagannath Temple served on a plantain leaf.

Temples in the region make offerings to the presiding deities. The prasada of the Jagannath Temple is specifically called Mahaprasad meaning greatest of all prasadas. It consists of 60 recipes/dishes, so it is called Sathie Pauti.

Another misconception that people refer is that the Mahaprasad consists of 56 dishes (called Chhapana Bhoga). It is however false, as this concept prevails in the present day Vrindavan/Braj region, which is based on the legend that Krishna missed his eight meals for seven days, while trying to save a village from a storm holding up the Govardhan hill, as a shelter.

While in Odia Tradition, the Bhoga is referred to as ସାଠିଏ ପଊଟି (Sathie Pauti), as The Principal Prasad prepared for Jagannath consists of 60 dishes (called Abadha Mahaprasad). The names of the dishes prepared are unknown as it is considered a sacred secret only known to Mahasuar (chief cook). It is believed that the mother is preparing dishes for her children, hence she does not share what she is preparing and how much quantity she prepares.

== Fish and seafood ==
Fish and other seafood are eaten mainly in coastal areas. Several curries are prepared from crab, prawn and lobster with spices. Freshwater fish is available from rivers and irrigation canals.

== List of dishes ==
=== Rice dishes and rotis ===
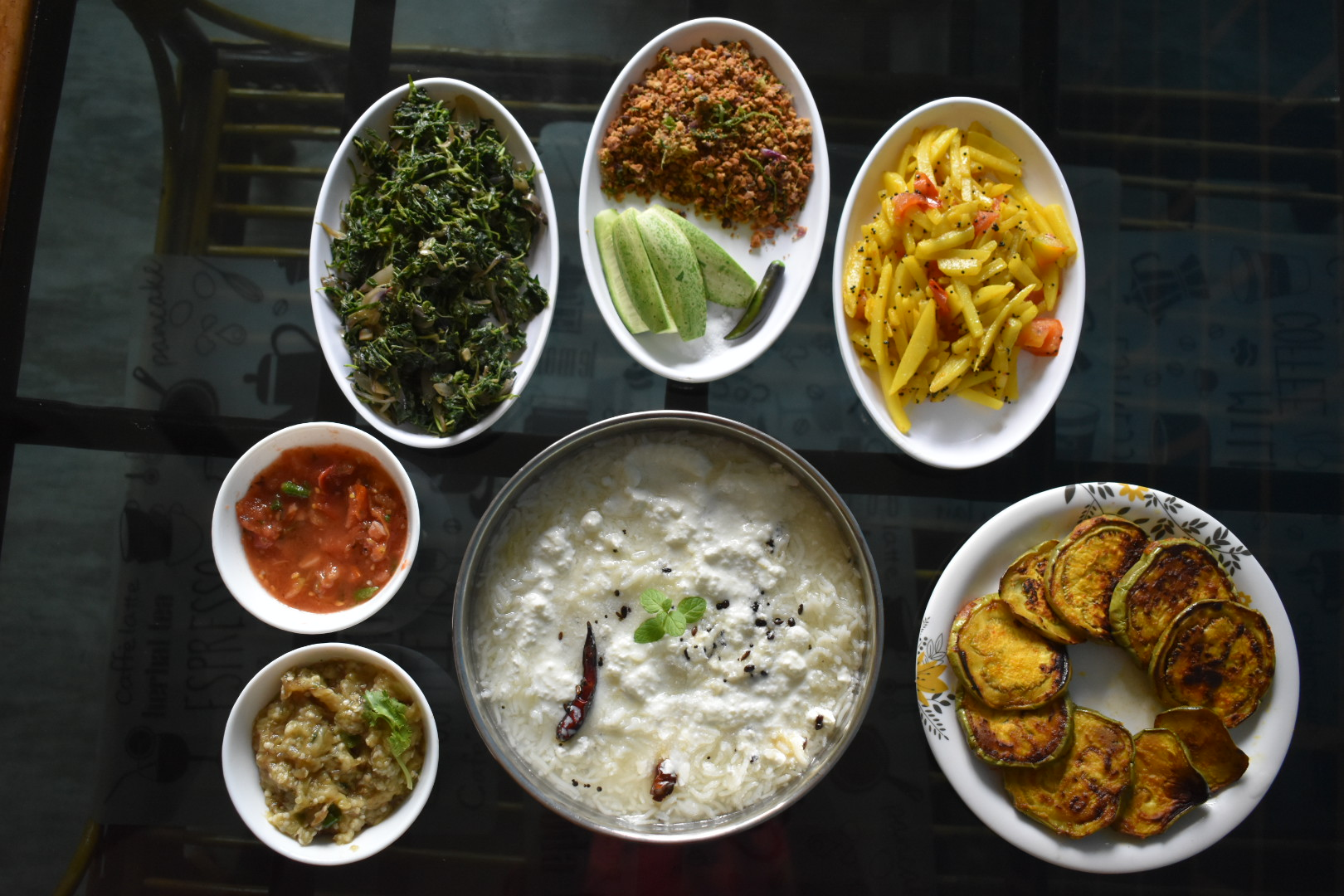
Pakhala Platter

- Pakhala is a rice dish made by adding water with curd to cooked rice. It may then be allowed to ferment overnight. This is called basi pakhala and dahi pakhala. The unfermented version of this is called saja pakhala. It is served with green chillies, onions, yoghurt, badi etc. It is primarily eaten in summer.
- Khechudi is a rice dish cooked with lentils. It is the Odia version of khichdi.
- Palau is a rice dish made from meat, vegetables and raisins. It is the Odia version of pilaf.
- Kanika is a sweet dish made with rice, and garnished with raisins and nuts.
- Ghee rice is prepared by frying rice with ghee and cinnamon.
- Upma, served with ghugni is a breakfast recipe made with semolina.
- Janta Roti is a traditional, ultra-soft flatbread from Odia Cuisine in Odisha. Unlike regular rotis made with raw dough, Janta Roti uses a two-step cooking method where the wheat flour is pre-cooked in boiling water or milk before being rolled and roasted. This makes the roti exceptionally soft, melt-in-the-mouth, and easy to digest—making it a favorite for young children, elderly family members, or people recovering from illness.

=== Dal ===
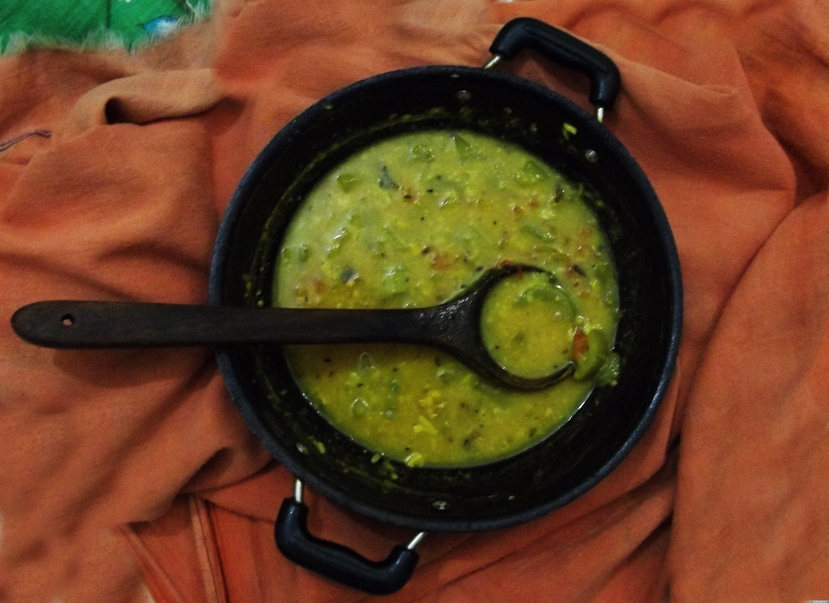
Dalma

- Dalma: A dish made from dal and vegetables. It is generally made from toor dal and contains chopped vegetables like green papaya, plantain, eggplant, pumpkin, gourd, etc. It is garnished with turmeric, mustard seeds, and panch phutana. There are several variations of this dish.
- Dali: A dish made from one of the Dals like tur, horse gram, chana, masur, mung or a combination of these.

=== Curries ===
- Santula: A dish made up of finely chopped vegetables which are sauteed together with garlic, green chilies, mustard and spices. It has several variations.
- Guguni: A popular dish made from overnight-soaked dried peas, potato with some amount of horse gram powder to thicken the curry. It is a popular street food mostly eaten with bara in undivided districts of Puri and Cuttack.
- Chhatu rai: A dish made from mushrooms and mustard paste.
- Alu potala rasa: Curry made from potato and pointed gourds.
- Kadali manja rai: A curry made from banana plant stem and mustard seeds. Manja refers to the banana plant stem which is also used in dalma.
- Mohura: A curry made up of bodi, tamarind, jaggery, along with vegatables.
- Besara: Assorted vegetables in mustard paste tempered with pancha phutan.

=== Khattas and chutneys ===
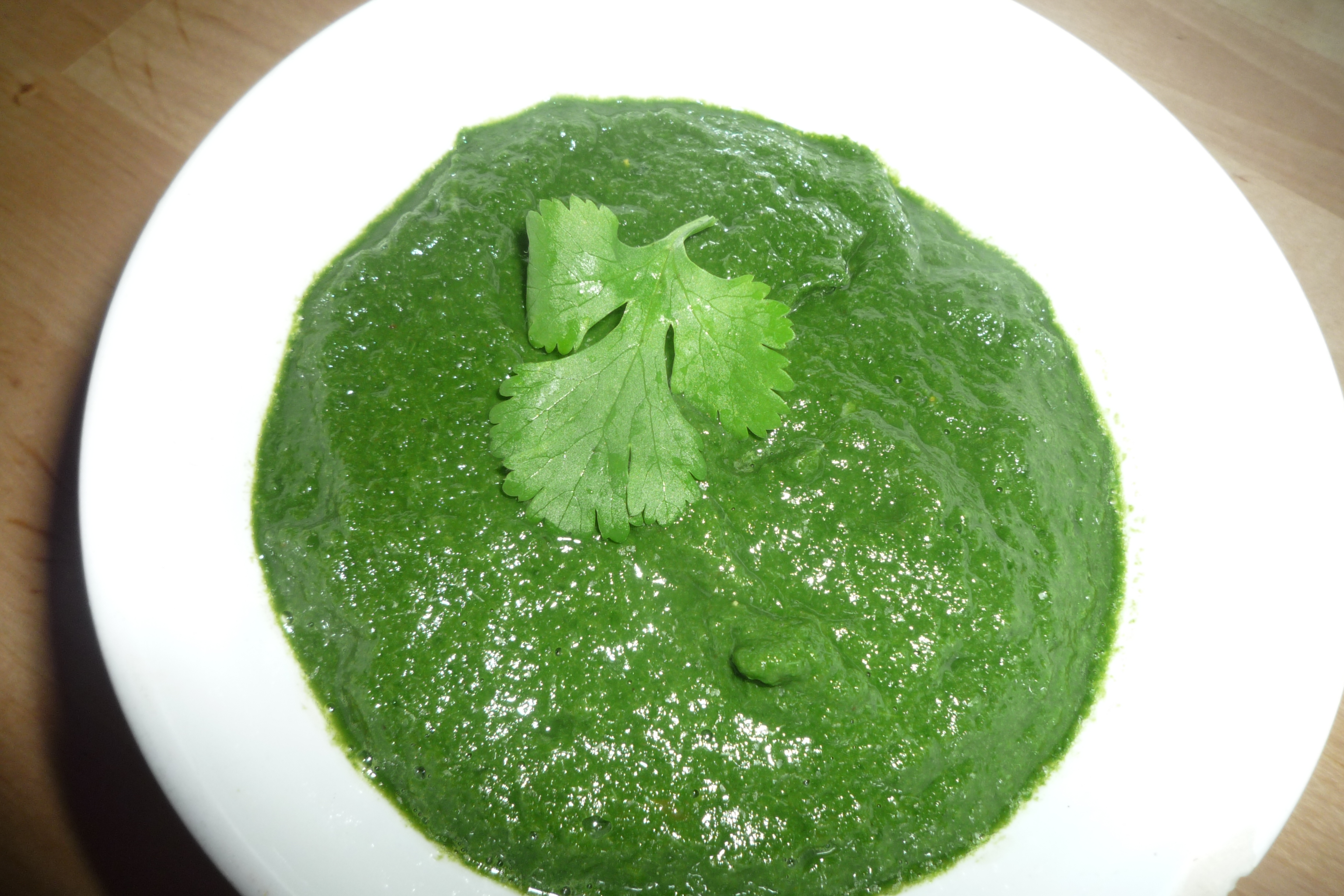
Dhania-Patra Chutney

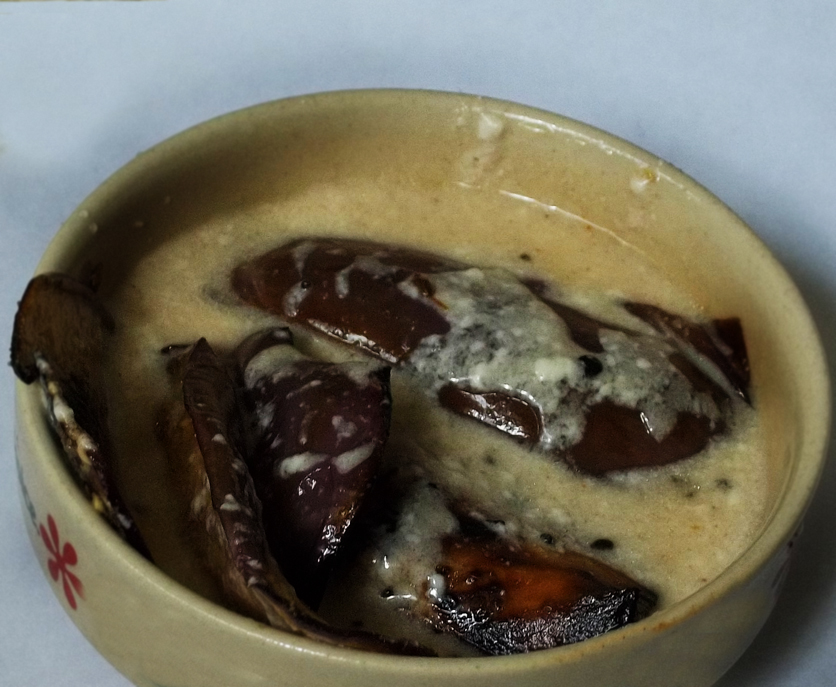
Dahi Baigana

Khatta refers to a type of sweet-and-sour side dish or chutney usually served with Odia thalis.

- Dahi baigana: A sour dish made from yoghurt and eggplants.
- Dahi bhendi: A sour dish made from yoghurt and ladies' fingers.
- Khajuri khata: A sweet-and-sour dish made from tomatoes and dates.
- Amba khatta: A sweet-and-sour dish made from raw mangoes.
- Ou khatta: Elephant apple sweet-and-sour dish.
- Tomato khata: A sweet-and-sour dish made from tomatoes and jaggery.
- Dhania-patra chutney: A chutney made from coriander leaves.

=== Sāgå (salad greens) ===
Salad greens (sāgå / ଶାଗ) are prepared by adding pānchå phuṭåṇå (ପାଞ୍ଚ ଫୁଟଣ), with or without onion/garlic, and sometimes eaten with påkhāḷå (ପଖାଳ). Plants used as salad greens include:

- Kåḷåmå sāgå (କଳମ ଶାଗ) Ipomoea aquatica (Water Spinach)
- Kosålā/Khåḍā sāgå (କୋଶଳା ଶାଗ/ଖଡା ଶାଗ): prepared from amaranth leaves.
- Båjji sāgå (ବଜ୍ଜୀ ଶାଗ): Prepared from Amaranthus dubius leaves.
- Leuṭiā sāgå (ଲେଉଟିଆ ଶାଗ)Amaranthus viridis leaves and tender stems.
- Pāḷångå sāgå (ପାଳଙ୍ଗ ଶାଗ) spinach
- Poi sāgå (ପୋଈ ଶାଗ): prepared from basella leaves and tender stems.
- Bāråmāsi/Såjånā sāga (ବାରମାସି/ସଜନା ଶାଗ): prepared from leaves of the drumstick tree. Cooked with lentils or as is with fried onions.
- Sunusuniā sāgå (ସୁନୁସୁନିଆ ଶାଗ) Marsilea polycarpa leaves.
- Pitāgamā sāgå (ପିତାଗମା ଶାଗ)
- Piḍångå sāgå (ପିଡଙ୍ଗ ଶାଗ)
- Kakhāru sāgå (କଖାରୁ ଶାଗ): Prepared from leaves of the pumpkin plant.
- Madarangā sāgå (ମଦରଙ୍ଗା ଶାଗ): prepared from leaves of Alternanthera sessilis.
- Soriså sāgå (ଶୋରିସ ଶାଗ): Mustard greens
- Methi sāgå (ମେଥୀ ଶାଗ): prepared from methi or Fenugreek leaves and besara (mustard paste) cooked with vegetable.
- Måṭårå sāgå (ମଟର ଶାଗ): The inner coating of peas is removed and then chopped to make the saga.
- Nāliyā/Lāliyā kosåḷā sāgå (ନାଲିଆ/ଲାଲିଆ କୋଶଳା ଶାଗ) is made from green leaves with red stems. Other saagas that are eaten are pita gahama, khada, poi, kosala, and sajana. Some items are as follows:
- Sāgå Bhåjā (ଶାଗ ଭଜା)
- Sāgå Mugå (ଶାଗ ମୁଗ)
- Sāgå Båḍi (ଶାଗ ବଡି)
- Sāgå Rāi (ଶାଗ ରାଇ)
- Sāru påtrå tiyåṇå/tuṇå/tåråkāri (ସାରୁ ପତ୍ର ତିଅଣ/ତୁଣ/ତରକାରି)

=== Pithas (sweet cakes) ===
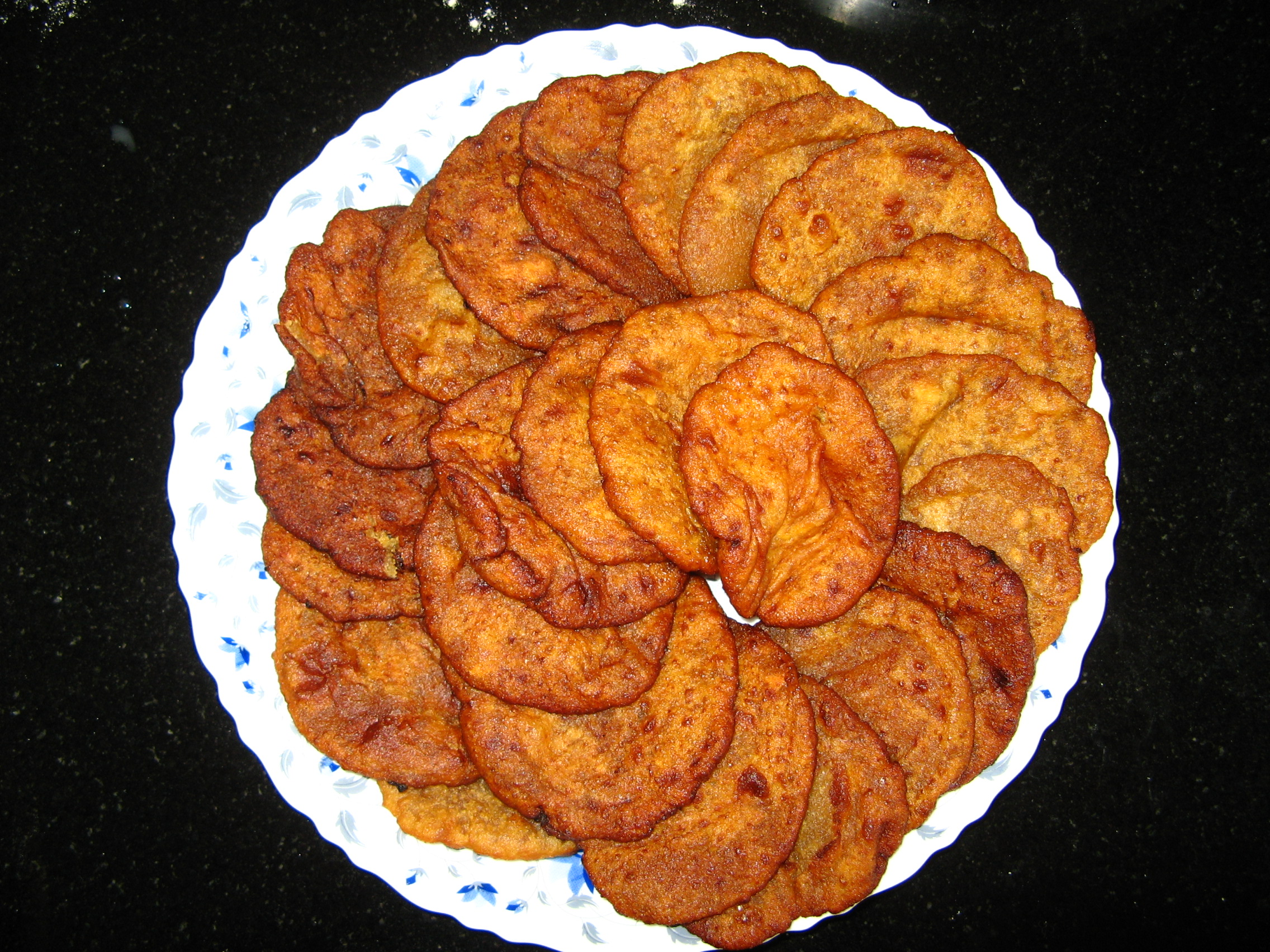
Kakara Pitha

Pithas and sweets are types of traditional Odia dishes.

- Poda pitha- Traditional Odia cake, a special delicacy in Makar Sankrati & Raja festival, is made up of by layering rice and urad dal batter, stuffed with jaggery and coconut filling.
- Chhena Poda pitha- A softer & more spongy variant of Poda pitha is made with chhena(cottage cheese) as base ingredient.
- Enduri Pitha- This stuffed steamed rice cake, wrapped in turmeric leaves is a Prathamashtami special dish.
- Arisa Pitha- A popular fried pitha made up of rice & jaggery, topped with sesame seeds. This has longer shelf-life & is relished as a snack.
- Manda Pitha- Similar to Ukdiche Modak, these are round steamed pithas, made up of rice and stuffed with coconut & jaggery filling. Specially made during Raja, Kumara Purnima and last Thursday of Margashira month festivals.
- Kakara Pitha- This is a fried version of Manda Pitha.
- Chakuli Pitha- Commonly made in every household on a regular basis, these are round thin pancakes served with bhajaa(vegetable fry), santula, dalma, milk or jaggery.
- Budha Chakuli pitha- A thick pancake usually made from leftover rice batter by mixing banana, sweeteners & seasonings.
- Gainthaa pitha- Bite sized steamed rice pitha, usually made along Manda Pitha and specially on Boula Amavasya.
- Chhunchi Patra pitha- Renowned for its thinness, this pitha is a wrap made by brushing rice batter on a pan with a cloth & stuffed with coconut & jaggery filling.
- Muaaan pitha- A bigger version of Manda Pitha made by layering batter & cocunt filling, on a cotton/muslin cloth tied over a steamer.
- Taala pitha- A rare pancake made by flavouring the chakuli pitha batter with grounded ice apple.
- Chitau pitha- A pan-baked unturned pitha, made from rice batter & topped with coconut shavings. This is specially made on Chitau Amavasya & first Thursday of Margashira month.
- Itli pitha- Similar to idli, this pitha is made from urad dal and rice batter, topped with coconut shavings. Commonly relished with ghughuni/bhughuni or Dalma.
- Gajaa pitha- Another variant of Manda Pitha, stuffed with sweetened moong sprouts filling. The structure, unlike the normal manda are a little peaked from top. This is specially made for Lord Dhabaleshwar on the occasion of Bada Osha.
- Dudura Pitha- A fried puffed sweet pithas, mostly prepared in Sambalpur district of Odisha and offered to Maa Samalei.

=== Egg, chicken and mutton ===
- Anda tarkari: An egg curry prepared with onion and tomato paste
- Chicken tarkari: A chicken curry
- Chicken kasa
- Saru Patra Poda Chicken
- Mansa tarkari
- Mansa kasa
- Mansa besara
- Baunsa Poda Mansa: Mutton or Chicken roasted inside bamboo stems.
- Patra Poda Mansa: Mutton or Chicken wrapped in leaves and roasted .
- Mati Handi Mansa: Mutton or Chicken cooked in earthen pots.

=== Fish and other sea food ===
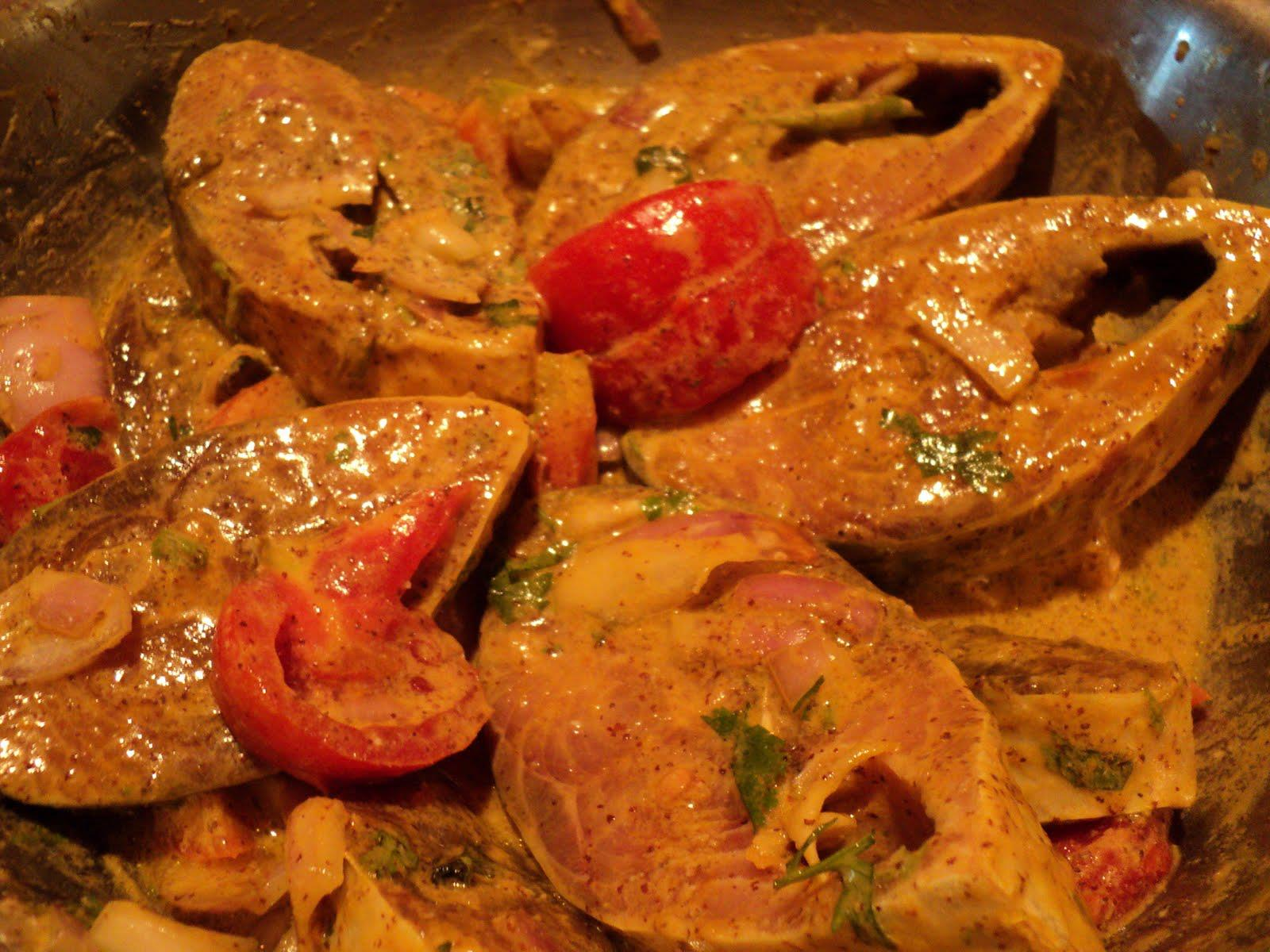
Ilishi maachha tarkari

- machha besara: A fish curry prepared with mustard paste.
- Machha Mahura: A fish curry prepared with small fish and vegetables.
- Machha Jhola
- Machha chhencheda: Fish mashed with a vegetable curry prepared in a ghee rich gravy.
- Chunna Machha Jhola: A fish curry, similar to Machha Jhola, but prepared with small smelt fish.
- Chunna Machha Tarkari: Small fried smelt fishes
- Chingudi Malai Tarkari: A prawn curry
- Kankada Jhola: Crab curry
- Chingudi chadchadi
- Kokali sukhua rai
- Mullet curry (ଖଅଙ୍ଗା ମାଛ ତରକାରୀ)
- Milkfish Curry (ସେବା ଖଙ୍ଗା ମାଛ ତରକାରୀ)
- smoked oil sardine (dry fish) with garlic- କୋକଲି ଶୁଖୁଆ ସେକା /ପୋଡା

Smoked Dry sardinea are cleaned and grinded coarsely together with garlic, green chilly, salt using mortar and pestle or grinder. Dry White bait fish (ଚାଉଳି ଶୁଖୁଆ), dry shrimp (ଚିଙ୍ଗୁଡ଼ି ଶୁଖୁଆ, ତାଂପେଡା) etc. also prepared in similar way, likely flakes/powder.

- seer fish (କଣି ମାଛ)/ mackerel (କାନାଗୁର୍ତ୍ଆ, ମରୁଆ) curry, chilly
- Bitter dry fish fry (ପିତା ଶୁଖୁଆ ଭଜା)- small freshwater nutrient dense fish dried in sun hygienically and eaten fried or smoked.
- ପୋହଳା ମାଛ ତରକାରୀ (minor /small carp fish curry). Fried small carp in onion or mustard based gravy.
- Mola fry/ chips/ boiled grind. ମହୁରାଳୀ ମାଛ ଭଜା / ଛଣା / ଚକଟା. Very nutritious. After cleaning, boil in little water, salt and turmeric powder and then mixed with mustard oil, green chilly, garlic, onion and grinded into a coarse paste.

=== Fritters and fries ===
- Alloo piaji: A savory snack, similar to pakora or fritters, made with potatoes and onions, long-sliced, mixed and dipped in a batter of gram-flour, and then deep-fried.
- Bhendi baigana bhaja: okra (ladies' fingers) and eggplant, sliced and deep-fried
- Badi chura: A coarsely crushed mixture of sun-dried lentil dumplings (badi), onion, garlic, green chillies and mustard oil
- Pampad: flat savory snack like deep-friend or roasted appetizer, which looks very similar to a roti, usually eaten during lunch time
- Phula badi: bigger and inflated versions of the normal Badi - a sun-dried lentil dumpling
- Sajana chhuin bhaja: drumsticks sliced into pieces and deep/shallow fried in oil
- Desi kankada bhaja (ଦେଶୀ କାଙ୍କଡ଼ ଭଜା) - a vegetable found in hilly areas and fried with oil, onion, dried chilli flakes, cumin powder made into a curry, fry, chips.

=== Snacks ===
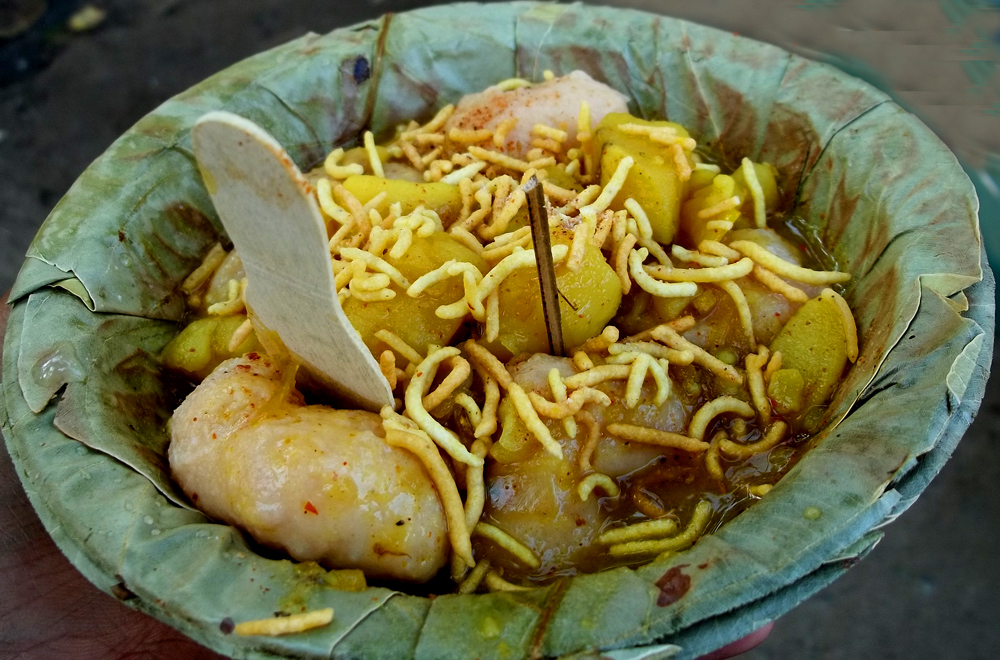
Dahibara Aludam

- Ghugni: A spicy dish made from peas, can be served with pooris.
- Gupchup
- Chaat
- Dahibara Aludam
- Chanachura or Baramaza
- Piaji
- Bara
- Gulgula
- Chuda (Poha) Bhaja
- Chuda (Poha) Dahi as breakfast
- Mudhi (Mur mura) as breakfast or evening snacks
- Khai
- Chaula bhaja
- Checha Piaji
- Kachodi chaat
- Suji Bara
- Pakudi
- Aloo chop
- Baigani
- Dantikili(mudki/murki)
- Singada (samosa)

=== Desserts and sweets ===
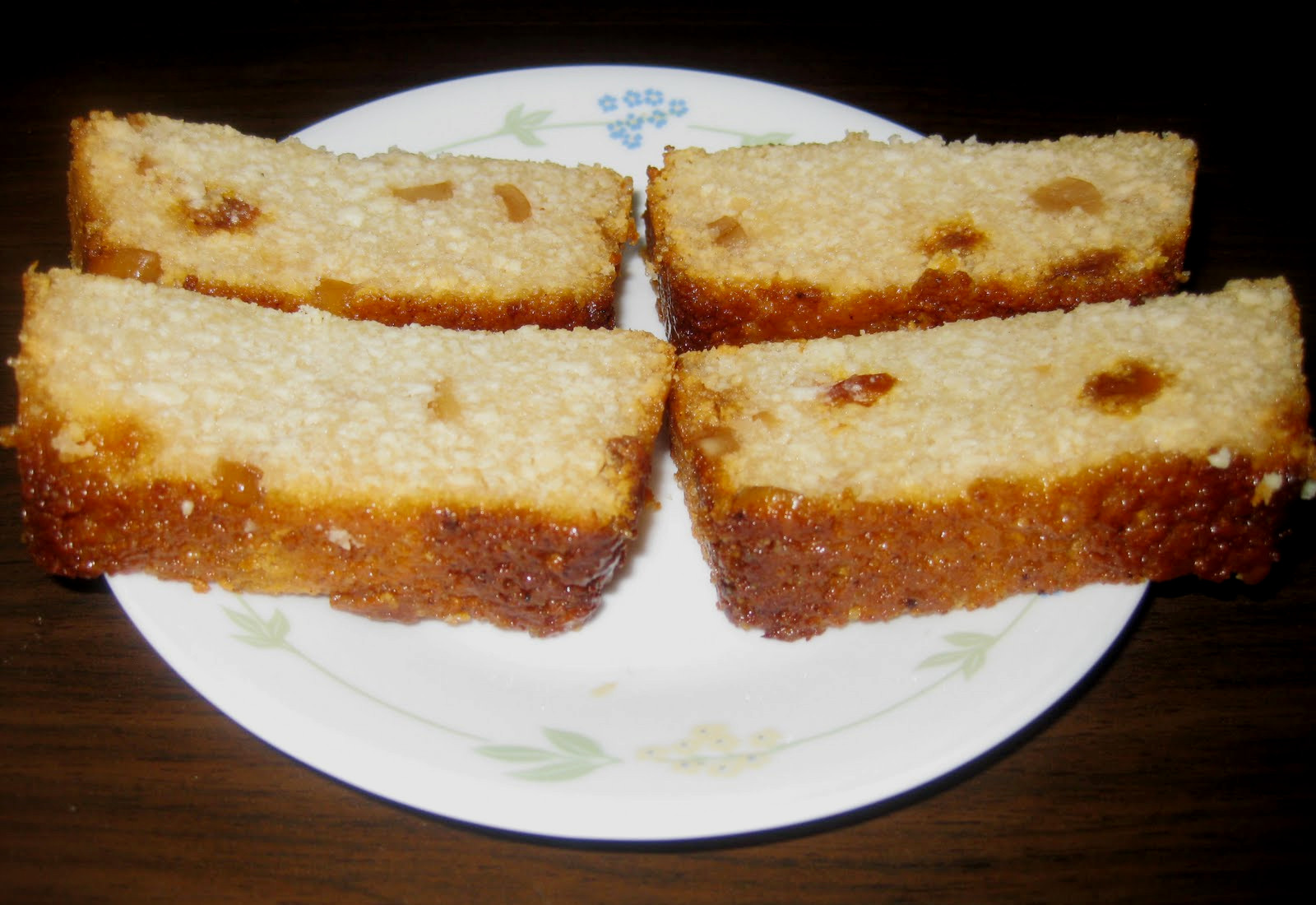
Chenna Poda

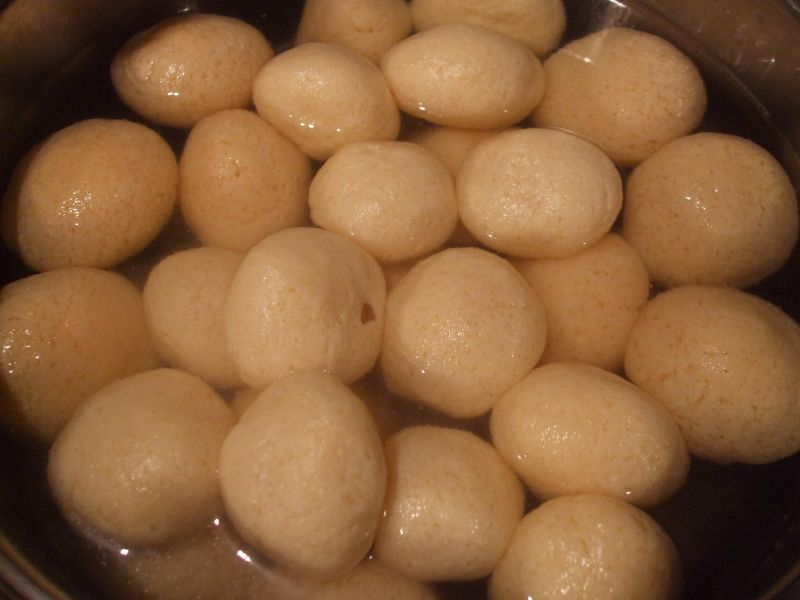
Rasagola

- Kheeri: Kheeri is the Odia word for kheer, predominantly made up of rice.
- Chhena Poda: A sweet made from soft cheese dipped in sugar syrup and baked. It may contain dry fruits.
- Chhena Gaja
- Malpua
- Kora
- Khira sagara
- Khirsapani
- Chhena kheeri
- Suji kheeri
- Chhena Jhili
- Rasagola
- Rasabali
- Rasmalai
- Sarsatia
- Aadasi
- Attakali
- Khaja
- Magaj Ladu
- Gajja: a light savory snack
- Rabidi: a sweet curd like dish
- Mudki: A famous savory snack which resembles a jalebi but the only difference is that jalebi are on the sweet palette where as mudki are light and more savoury.
- Chenna Mudki
- Mathapuli: a dessert made out of urad dal and sugar syrup. Found in Khurda District, particularly in places such as Tangi, Chandapur, Banapur.

=== Drinks ===
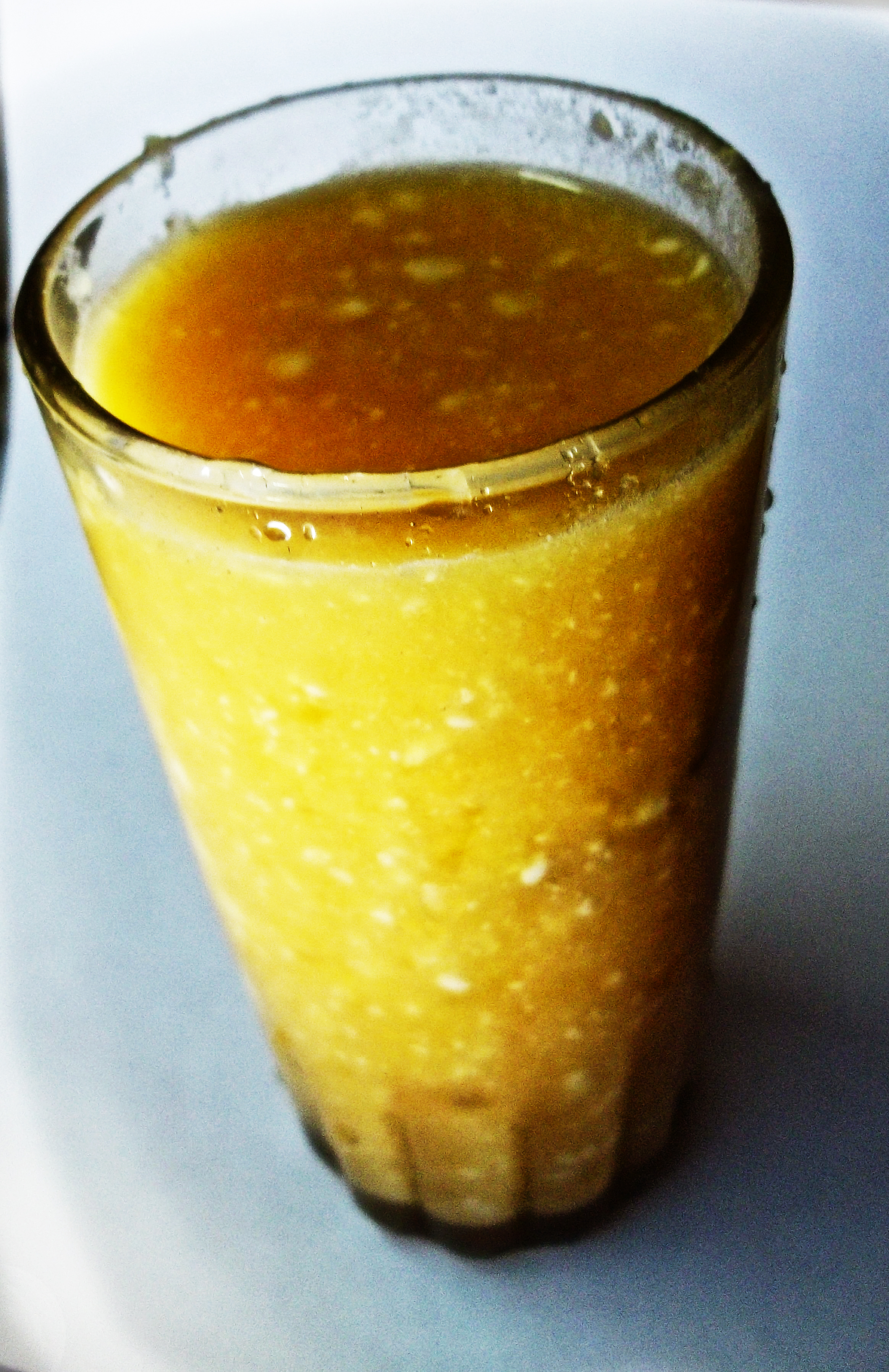
Bela Pana

There are many traditional alcoholic and non-alcoholic drinks which are unique to Odisha. Some are made during specific festivals or as an offering to Hindu gods, and others are made all around the year. The drinks which have a thick consistency are usually called paṇaa and the ones with have a watery consistency are usually known as sarbat. Many of the ethnic tribes of Odisha have their own indigenous drinks made from forest produce. Any drink that contains alcohol is usually called madya

==== Alcoholic ====
- Aamba mada - mango-based alcoholic beverage
- Aakhu mada - sugarcane-based alcoholic beverage
- Amrutabhanda mada - papaya-based alcoholic beverage
- Anlaa mada - Indian gooseberry-based alcoholic beverage
- Dimiri tadi - juice of Indian fig-based alcoholic beverage
- Dimiri mada - pulp of Indian fig-based alcoholic beverage
- Handia - traditional rice beer popular among the tribes of Odisha
- Kadali mada - banana-based alcoholic beverage
- Guda mada - jaggery-based alcoholic beverage
- Pijuli mada - guava-based alcoholic beverage
- Jamukoli mada - Malabar plum-based alcoholic beverage
- Jana mada - maize-based alcoholic beverage
- Tala mada - palm-based alcoholic beverage
- Kumuda mada - squash-based alcoholic beverage
- Landa - rice-based alcoholic beverage
- Mahulu mada or mahuli - mahua flower-based alcoholic beverage
- Panasa mada - jackfruit-based alcoholic beverage
- Pendum - rice-based alcoholic beverage consumed by the Bonda tribe
- Rasi - a type of rice beer related to handia; popular among the tribes of Odisha
- Sagur - alcoholic beverage made from different fruit nuts, mahua flowers or fruits using the process of distillation known as sagur by the Bonda tribe
- Salapi - palm-based alcoholic beverage
- Sapung - sago palm-based alcoholic beverage consumed by the Bonda tribe
- Sindi mada - date palm-based alcoholic beverage
- Tamati mada - tomato-based alcoholic beverage
- Tetel mada - tamarind-based alcoholic beverage

==== Cannabis-based ====
- Bhangaw sarbat or bhangaw pawṇaa - beverage containing a paste of cannabis leaves

==== Non-alcoholic ====
- Adhara paṇa - a milk and chhena-based drink offered to the trinity at the end of Ratha Yatra festival
- Amba paṇa - a mango-based summer drink
- Bela paṇa - a drink made from wood or stone apple during Pana Sankranti festival
- Dahi pudina sarbat - a summer drink made using curd and mint leaves
- Ghola dahi - buttermilk with spices
- Landa bagula dahi sarbat - a drink made from curd and sweet basil seeds
- Lemonade - summer drink made from water, lemon, sugar and salt
- Khajuri misri - summer drinks made from date palm misri, lemon and sweet basil seeds
- Mandia peja - a millet-based summer drink
- Jhara Paṇa - a summer drink made from arrowroot and jaggery in southern Odisha
- Tanka toraṇi - a fermented rice-water based drink prepared in Jagannath Temple
