= Sarangada =

- Gram Panchayat
- Location in Odisha, India Sarangada (India)
- Coordinates: 20.35°N 84.12°E
- Country: India
- State: Odisha
- District: Kandhamal
- Elevation: 374 m (1,227 ft)

Population (2011)
  - Total: 35,335

Languages
  - Official: Oriya
  - Local: Kui
- Time zone: UTC+5:30 (IST)
- PIN: 762106
- Telephone code: +916846

Sarangada is a Gram Panchayat in Kandhamal district in the Indian State of Odisha.

== Geography ==
Sarangada has an average elevation of 374 meters above sea level. It is located 51 km towards South from District headquarters Phulbani and 250 km from State Capital Bhubaneswar. Sarangada is surrounded by Baliguda Tehsil towards west, Raikia Tehsil towards East, Phiringia Tehsil towards North, Daringibadi Tehsil towards South. Sarangada is well connected by road and a good number of buses ply from Capital City Bhubaneswar, Silk City Berhampur and Other Cities of Southern & Western Odisha. Nearest Railway Stations are Muniguda, Rairakhol and Berhampur. Biju Patnaik Airport at Bhubaneswar, is the nearest Airport.

== Agriculture ==
Annual Average Rainfall of Sarangada is 1726 mm. Sarangada has a huge forest cover with diversities of different flora and fauna. The soil is mostly Black Soil & Red Light Texture Soil. Agriculture is mostly dependent upon Rainfed Farming, though there is a Minor Irrigation System sourcing from Salaguda Water Reservoir. Sarangada is famous for its Baby Potato farming in the winter. Rice, Maize, Turmeric, Ginger, Mustard Seeds are major field corps cultivated and Mango, Guava, Banana are the major horticultural crops cultivated in this area.

== Demography ==
As of 2011 Census, Sarangada Gram Panchayat have a population of 35,335 out of which 17,997 are female and 17,338 are male. There are 1038 females per 1000 male. Total Scheduled Tribe population is 20,282 and Scheduled Caste population is 5,355. Total Literacy Population is 21,123.

== History ==
Sarangada has a history of Zamindar system in the colonial period. Remnants of a Bungalow (Temporary Rest House) of British Period can be seen in the western region. It is believed that, this region was being reigned by one Saranga Deva. There are some remnants of historical importance in the Hatisala Hill. But, the facts are yet to be established with structured research.

== Culture ==
Sarangada inherits a culture of tribal values blended with post-independence transformations. Magha Yatra is the benchmark festival of this region, observed with onset of spring season every year during January/February. In 2000, a theater movement started reiterating the mythological values of Hinduism by some of the next generation youths. Kandul Yatra is a local festival observed to worship the nature marked with harvesting of pulses. An itinerant form of folk and faith - Danda Nacha, is most popular in this reason which starts from every year on the first calendar day of April and continues up to 13 days with valediction on Maasanta (Month-end) or Sankranti often referred as Meru or Maha Vishuva Sankranti. Ratha Yatra, Maha Siva Ratri, Rajo, etc. are other festivals observed in Sarangada. Though Nature worshiping is prevalent in some communities, Goddess Maa Patakhanda, is believed as the Saviour of the village by the Shaktas.

== Education ==
Formal Education facilities, ranging from primary level to higher level constitutes the academia. Government and Public run educational institutions are established in the geographical distribution of this Gram Panchayat.

- Kandhamal Mahavidyalay
- Sarangada High School
- Ashram Girls High School
- Govt. M.E School
- Saraswati Sishu bidya bhaban
- saraswati sishu mandir

== Public health ==
Sarangada having rich green vegetation and free from environmental pollution, is a healthy place to live-in. Ground water is free of toxicity. Organic farming is a traditional practice in this place. Life expectancy is at par with state average of 59.6 in 2011.

Malaria is a common health issue, creating morbidity and mortality in the area. Though massive prevention measures are being taken, malarial deaths are prevalent. Water borne diseases are more prevalent in the rainy season due to the infection of water sources.

A State run Hospital with modern medical facilities and trained health personnel, is available with residential set-up for curative purpose. Another Ayurvedic Dispensary is located at nearby Bilabadi Village.

== Public facilities ==
Sarangada is well connected with the government-run postal network, with branch post offices in villages and one sub-post office at the headquarters. A police station is located at the northern part of the village. A nationalised scheduled bank, State Bank of India, provides banking services to the public. Some other public facilities are listed below:

- State Bank of India branch & ATM
- Revenue inspector's office
- BSNL telephone exchange
- Cellular (2G) telecommunication service by BSNL & Reliance
- Govt. veterinary dispensary

== Trade and commerce ==
Sarangada is a producer and exporter of Myrobalans like Amla Emblica officinalis, Bibhitaki (local name bahada) Terminalia bellirica, Haritaki (local name harida) Terminalia chebula, siali leaf Bauhinia vahlii, turmeric Curcuma longa, ginger Zingiber officinale, mustard seed Brassica juncea, rapeseed Brassica napus, mango kernel Mangifera indica, mahua flower & seed Madhuca longifolia, pigeon pea (local name kandula) Cajanus cajan, arrowroot (local name palua) Maranta arundinacea, and several other minor forest produce. Market is largely unorganised with presence of some medium scale business agencies. Sarangada have intrastate and inter-state trade links with the business organisations of India. A weekly market on Wednesday, links the local consumers with the small scale vendors.

== Tourism ==
The peripheral villages are dominantly inhabited by the tribal (Kandha) population. Tourists interested in tribal tourism may visit the nearby villages to have a feel of tribal lifestyle. Apart from this, Sarangada is rich in bio-diversity, in terms of vegetation, forest coverage, medicinal species and wildlife. Most of the tribal villages have road connectivity and safe for travelers. October to May is the recommended period for tourists. Average temperature is 35 degree Celsius in summer and 10 degree Celsius in winter. Tourist will get Hotels at Phulbani, G. Udayagiri or Baliguda. Daringbadi is 65 km by road from Sarangada, which is a famous Hill Station in Odisha. Belaghar, which is famous for Tribal Tourism (Kutia Kandha - PTG) and Eco-Tourism, is 100 km by road.

== Food & beverages ==
Rice, Dal and Curry (Non-veg.&Veg.) are most widely consumed staple food in Sarangada. People prefer to prepare traditional cuisines like Arisa Pitha, Manda Pitha, Kakara Pitha, Kheer, etc. on festive days. Some locals prepare food products from Mango like Amba Achar (pickles), Amba Sadha (Dried Mango Puree), Champeita (Dried Mango Pulp) during harvesting of mangoes in summer. Though one may not find a professional restaurant or fine dining, some small eateries serves the local food.

Tea and lemonade are the popular non-alcoholic drinks in Sarangada. An alcoholic drink, mahuli, prepared in indigenous process from mahua flower (Madhuca longifolia), sells in the local unorganised market.

== Sports ==
The most popular sport played in Sarangada is association football, followed by cricket. Maa Patakhanda Football Team of Sarangada is well known for its dynamic defence and extravagant performance during local matches. Sarangada is the host for The Sarangadian Challenge Cup Football Tournament, in which reputed Football teams of Odisha participate.

== See also ==
- Phulbani
- Daringbadi
- Baliguda
