= Kanika (food) =

Rice dish

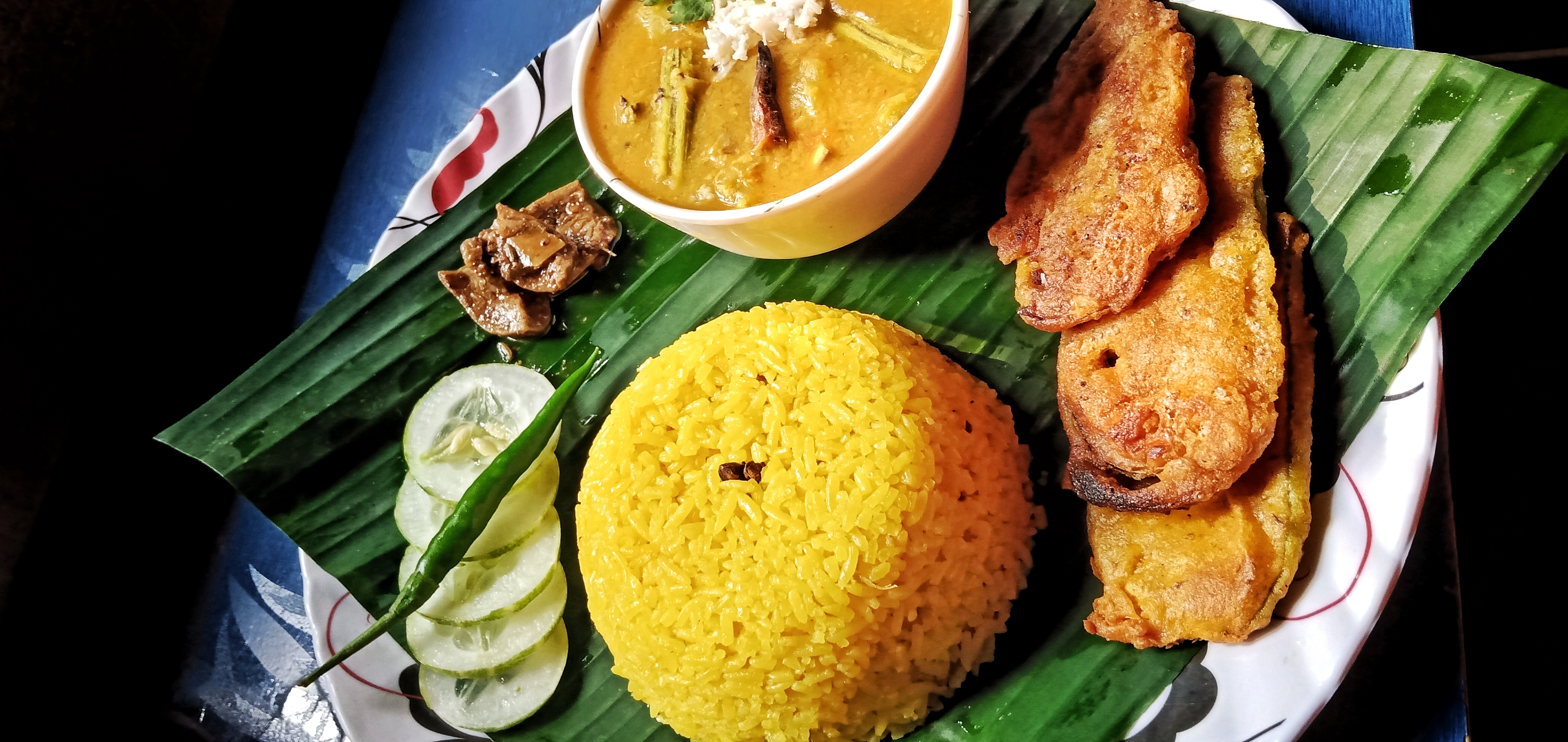
Kanika with dalma (served in bowl)

Kanika (Odia: କାନିକା) is an aromatic sweet rice dish. It is an Odia dish traditionally prepared during festivals and pujas. It is one of the cooked items of the 56 dishes prepared as part of Mahaprasada or Chappan Bhoga in the Jagannath Temple. It is offered to Lord Jagannath as part of the morning meal known as sakala dhupa.

The key ingredients used to make it are fragrant rice, ghee, raisins, cashews, black cardamom, green cardamom, cinnamon, cloves, mace, bay leaf, nutmeg powder, sugar, salt and turmeric.

== See also ==
- List of rice dishes
- Bisi bele bath, a rice dish from Karnataka, India
