= Rosaghara =

Large Indian kitchen complex

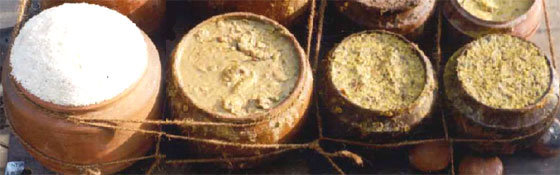
Mahaprasad (Large)

Rasoi ghara is a traditional kitchen of Jagannatha temple, Puri, Odisha, India. It is the 2nd largest kitchen in the world.

The food is cooked by suaras (also known as mahasuara or supakara), a sect that is given the charge since the beginning of the temple. The food cooked in rosaghara is vegetarian and use of onion, garlic, potatoes and bottle gourd are not allowed. A particular kind of earthenware known as kudua are used for cooking. Water drawn from two wells near the kitchen called Ganga and Jamuna are used for cooking. Over 500 varieties of food raja bhoga, chatra bhoga and jajamani bhoga are cooked that are offered to Jagannatha, Balabhadra and Subhadra in the temple pedestal ratnabedi and food offering pedestal Bhoga Mandapa five times a day. Chapana bhoga, 56 varieties of cooked food are offered almost every day. The food, after being offered to Jagannath, is sold at Ananda bajara as abadha. Ananda bajara is an open market, located to the North-east of the Singhadwara (major entrance) inside the temple complex. Every day food for over 5000-10000 is cooked where in special occasions food for over 10 million people is cooked in rosaghara. There are two passages to the food out from the kitchen; the first one leads to bhoga mandapa for larger kotha bhoga and chatra bhoga, and the other one leading to the inner sanctuary of the temple for the kotha bhoga offering. Except the suaras no one is allowed to go near the kitchen or even touch the food until they are offered at the traid of the temple.

== Location ==
The rasoighara is located in the temple's south-east direction in the outer compound.

== Cooking space ==
It is 150 feet long, 100 feet wide and about 20 feet high. There are 32 rooms with 250 earthen hearths within. Around 600 chefs known as suaras and 400 assistants together cook every day There are three types of hearths in the kitchen; Anna Chuli the rice hearth, Ahia Chuli and Pitha Chuli the dessert hearth. The rice hearth is 4 feet long 2.5 feet wide and 2 feet high. The rectangular space created between two rice hearths is known as Ahia. Lentil and other curries like Besara, mahura are cooked in the Ahia Chuli. There are ten cement-based Pitha chuli in rosaghara.

== History ==
=== Legend ===
The legends say that the mahasuaras work is supervised by Lakshmi where there is custom to promptly burying and starting a new batch of food if Lakshmi has any displeasure with the cooking.

== Read more ==
- Jagannath Temple, Puri
- Jagannath
