= Mahaprasad =

Mahaprasad (lit. 'great prasada/offering') may refer to:

- Mahaprasada, a type of prasada (offering) in Hinduism
  - Mahaprasad (Jagannath Temple), the prasada at Jagannath Temple, Puri in India
- Goat meat, produced via jhatka among Nihang Sikhs
