= Dahi machha =

Traditional Odia fish dish

- Course: Seafood curry
- Place of origin: India
- Region or state: Odisha, India
- Main ingredients: Fish, dahi (yogurt), spices

Dahi machha is a traditional Odia dish made of fish in a spicy yogurt-based sauce. It is usually served with rice as an accompaniment. Dahi machha jhola is liberally seasoned with turmeric, onions, garlic, mustard and garam masala. The use of turmeric imparts a yellow colour to the sauce base. Chopped fresh cilantro may be sprinkled on top for added flavour as well as enhanced appearance.

== Ingredients ==
Fish, dahi, potatoes, mustard, turmeric, garlic, chilli peppers, other seasonings.

== See also ==
- Machher jhol
- Chingudi jhola
- Chhencheda
- Odia cuisine
