= Tanka torani =

Traditional Odia drink made from fermented rice and curd

- Type: Drink
- Place of origin: India
- Region or state: Odisha
- Serving temperature: Cold
- Main ingredients: Rice, Water and curd

Tanka torani (Odia: ଟଙ୍କ ତୋରାଣି taṅka torāṇi) is a drink made from one-day-old cooked rice known as anna which is a part of Mahaprasada offered to Lord Jagannatha. It is available round the year in Ananda Bajara and is specially relished during summer.

== Recipe ==
Tanka Toraaṇi is made using the following ingredients:

- Cooked rice
- Curd
- Water
- Ginger
- Mango Ginger
- Green chilies
- Salt
- Roasted cumin powder
- Lemon leaves
- Curry leaves
- Basil leaves
- Lemon

Take one-day-old cooked rice along with the rice water. The rice is mashed and water and curd is added to it till the consistency is that of a drink. All the spices are then added and mixed thoroughly. The mixture is then kept for 2–3 hours and then served cold. It is traditionally made in earthen pots so that it remains cool.

== See also ==
- List of Indian drinks
