= Dahibara Aloodum =

Indian street food

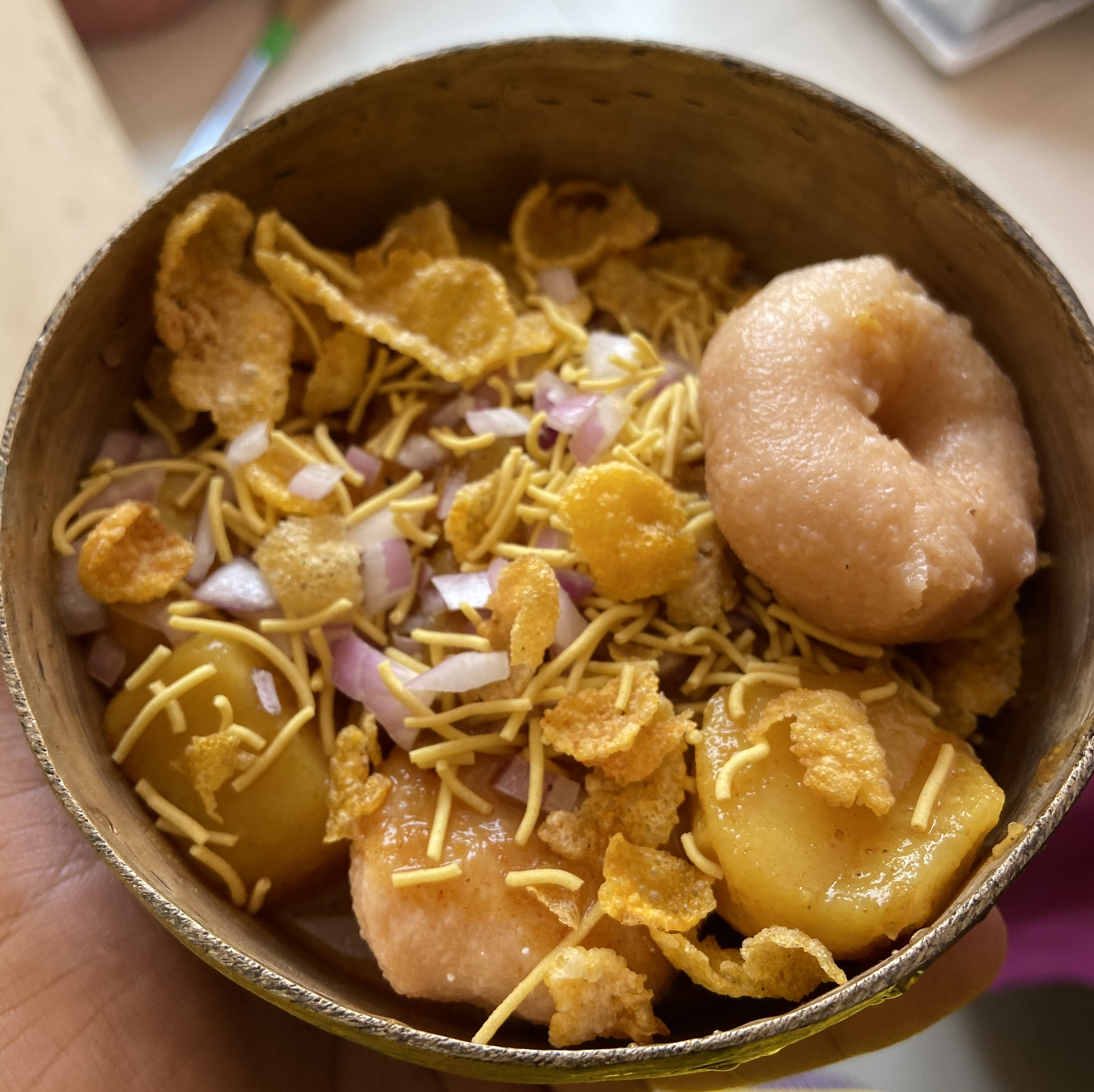
- Dahibara AlooDum
- Type: Chaat
- Place of origin: Indian subcontinent
- Region or state: Cuttack, Odisha
- Main ingredients: Vada, dahi (yogurt), Potato Curry and Pea Curry

Dahibara Aloodum (Odia: ଦହିବରା ଆଳୁଦମ; Odia: [d̪ɔhibɔɾa aɭud̪ɔm]) is a popular street food originating from Cuttack of the state Odisha. It is a variant of Dahi vada. The dish is prepared by soaking vadas (fried flour balls) in light dahi (yogurt) water which is tempered with mustard seeds and curry leaves. Then adding Aludum (potato curry) and Ghuguni (pea curry) to it, topped with an assortment of spices, onions, and coriander.

The dish is widely enjoyed across the state, particularly in the cities of Cuttack, Bhubaneswar, Puri, Sambalpur, Rourkela and Berhampur.

== History and Origin ==
Dahibara has been a part of Odia cuisine for centuries, traditionally consumed as a light, fermented dish with probiotic benefits. The combination of Dahibara and Aloodum is believed to have originated in Bidanasi (Old Cuttack), where street vendors near Barabati Fort first introduced the pairing of yogurt-soaked lentil dumplings with the spicy, flavorful Aloodum. This unique pairing quickly gained popularity, spreading across Cuttack and later throughout Odisha. Over time, it became a staple of Odia street food culture, with numerous vendors specializing in its preparation. Today, Dahibara Aloodum is widely enjoyed across India, recognized for its unique blend of tangy and spicy flavors.

It also got an award at the National Street Food Festival held at New Delhi in the year 2020.

== Preparation ==
Washed urad lentils are soaked in normal water overnight and ground into a batter for the bara, then deep fried in hot oil. The deep-fried baras are first put in water and then again transferred to light yogurt water for soaking for 3–5 hrs. Then the Baras are added with Aloodum (spicy potato curry) and Ghuguni (pea curry). Later chopped onion, cucumber, sprinkles of Indian snacks are added to garnish the dish.

=== Nutritional Value ===
Dahibara Aloodum is not only known for its taste but also for its nutritional benefits. It provides:

- Carbohydrates – Derived from potatoes and white peas.
- Proteins – Sourced from lentils used in vadas.
- Probiotics – Present in the yogurt-based buttermilk.
- Fiber – Found in peas and garnishes like onions.

Its light yet filling nature makes it an ideal snack, especially during the summer months when refreshing and easily digestible meals are preferred.

== Dahibara Aloodum Dibasa ==
Dahibara Aloodum is celebrated on March 1st as Dahibara Aloodum Dibasa, marking its cultural importance in Odisha. On this day, Odias across the globe share their love for this iconic dish through social media posts and gatherings.

This dish continues to be a cherished part of Odisha's culinary heritage. Its simplicity combined with complex flavors makes it an enduring favorite among locals and visitors alike. Whether served on roadside carts or at home kitchens during celebrations, the dish holds a special place in the hearts of Odias around the world.

== Cultural Significance and Popularity ==
Dahibara Aloodum is an integral part of Odia street food culture, especially in Cuttack, where it is sold at roadside stalls, food carts, and small eateries. Cuttack is often called the "Dahibara Aloodum Capital" due to the abundance of vendors specializing in the dish. It is often enjoyed as a breakfast or evening snack.

Many vendors in Cuttack and other cities have been serving this dish for generations, with some shops operating for over 50 years. The love for Dahibara Aloodum has led to food festivals dedicated to the dish, and it remains an essential part of Odia culinary heritage.
