= Machher jhol =

Fish curry in Bengali cuisine

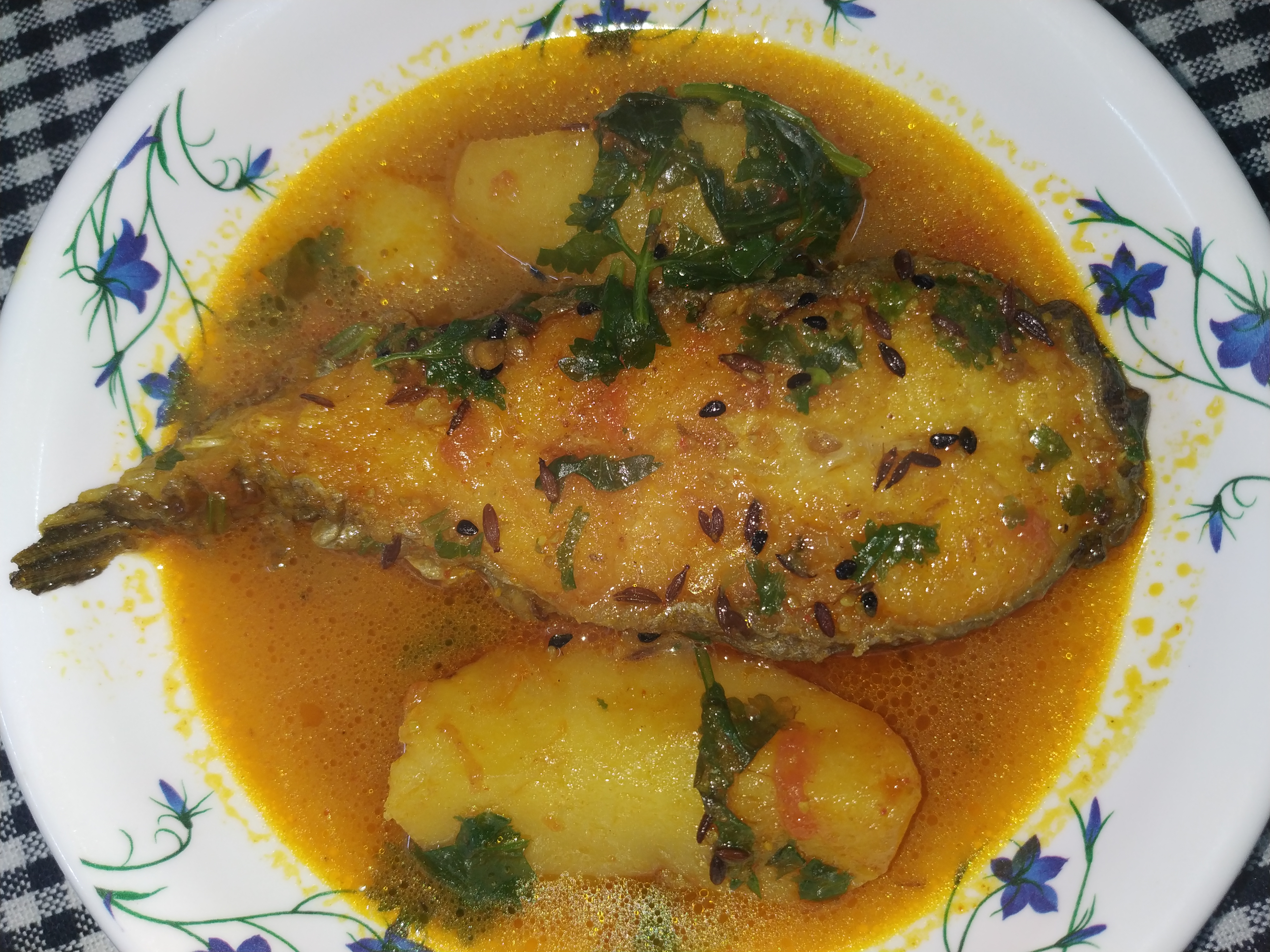
- Machher jhol with alu (potato)
- Type: Seafood curry
- Course: Main course
- Place of origin: India; Nepal; Bangladesh
- Region or state: Mithila of Nepal and Bihar, Bengal of West Bengal and Bangladesh, and Odisha
- Associated cuisine: Nepal (Maithili-Bhojpuri cuisine); India (Bihari-Bengali-Odia cuisine); Bangladesh (Bangla cuisine)
- Main ingredients: Fish, potato, chili, tomato, garlic, ginger, onion, Indian spices
- Similar dishes: Nga Thongba

Machher jhol (Bengali: মাছের ঝোল), machha jhola (Odia: ମାଛ ଝୋଳ), machhak jhor (Maithili: माछक झोर / Nepali: माछाको झोल) is a traditional spicy fish curry in Nepalese cuisine (including Maithil cuisine, Indian cuisine (including Maithili cuisine forming part of Bihari cuisine, and Odia cuisine), and Bangladeshi cuisine (Bengali cuisine) in the eastern part of the Indian subcontinent. It is in the form of a very spicy stew or gravy that is served with rice. Machher jhol is liberally seasoned with turmeric, garlic, onions, and grated ginger and Indian spices. Potatoes are added to the curry as a thickening agent. Tomatoes are also added to impart the dish with a reddish color which is preferred by the people of Bengal.

The kinds of fish typically used in Odia and Bengali households are ilish or ilishi, rui, and catla, as well as small fish that are normally favoured over others.

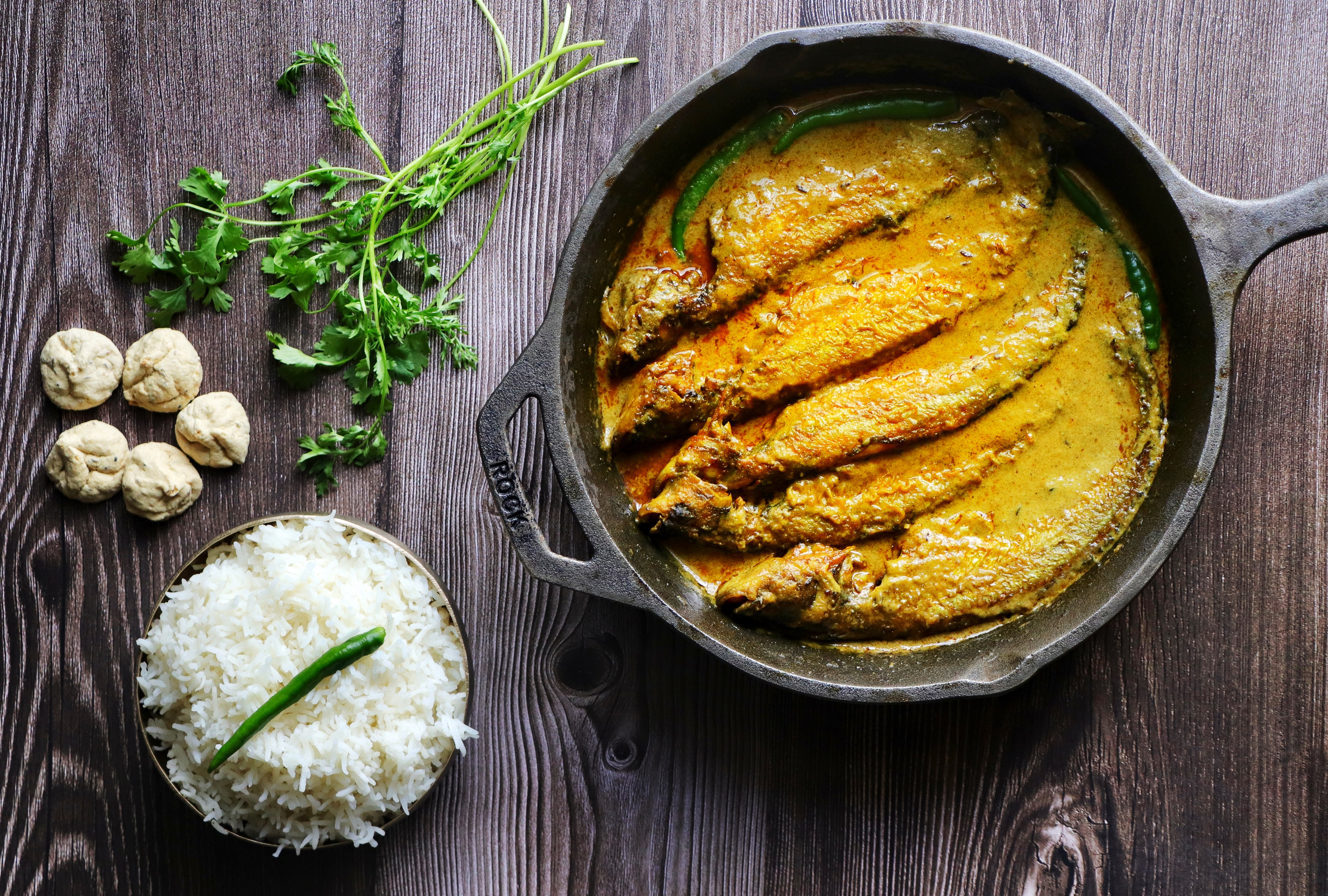
Pabda machher jhol cooked with ginger, green chilies, tomato paste, and coconut milk

== See also ==
- Bengali cuisine
- Dahi machha
- Chingudi jhola
- Chhencheda
- Odia cuisine
- Maithil cuisine
- Bhojpuri cuisine
