= Malabar plum =

Malabar plum is a common name for trees of tropical Asia in the family Myrtaceae and may refer to:

- Syzygium cumini
- Syzygium jambos
