= Dahi baigana =

Yogurt and eggplant dish

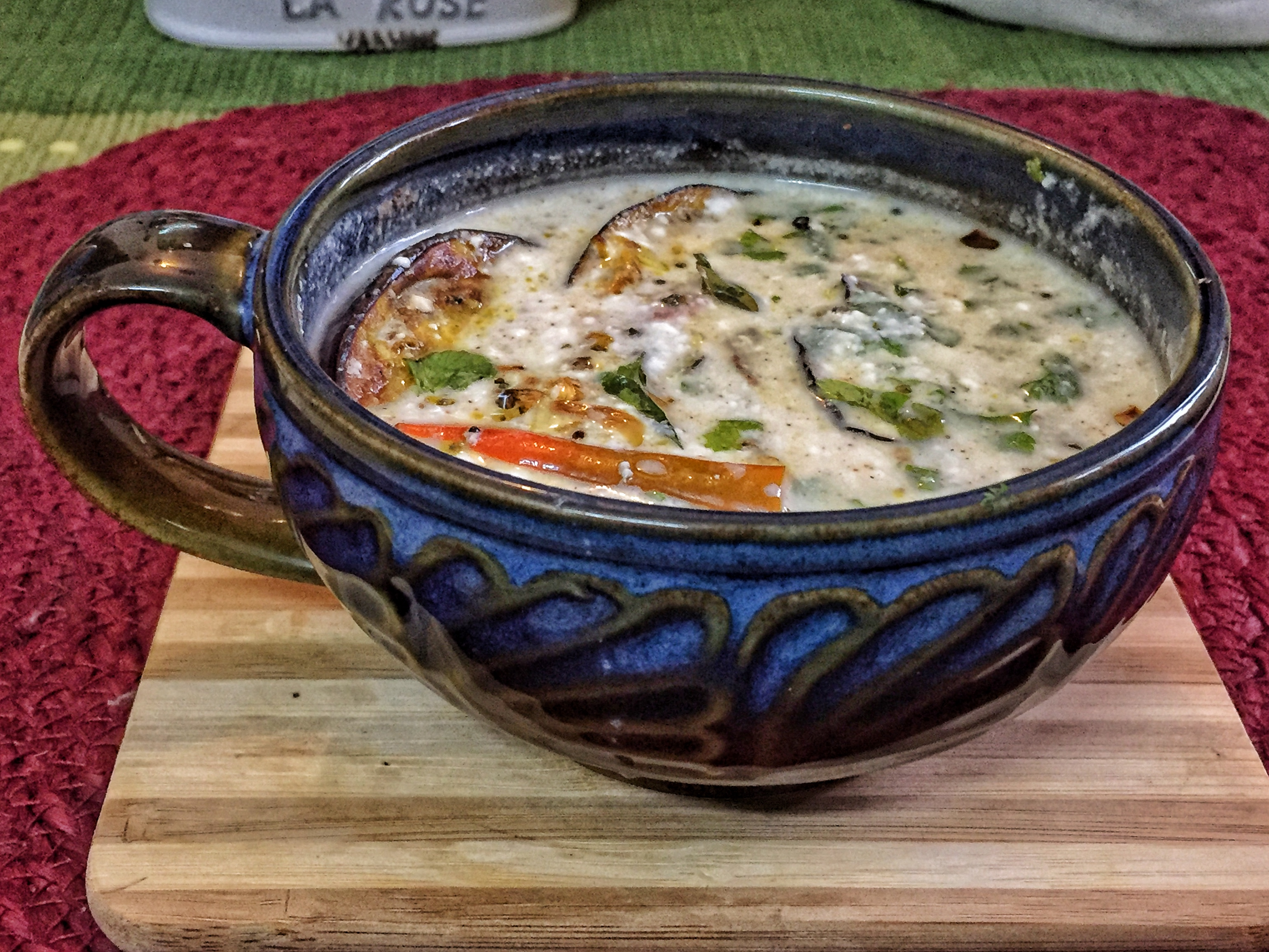
- Place of origin: India
- Region or state: Odisha
- Main ingredients: Eggplant, dahi (yogurt), vegetable oil or ghee, seeds (cumin, fennel, fenugreek, mustard)

Dahi baigana is an Odia dish prepared from dahi (yogurt) and eggplant especially during festivals.

The dish is commonly prepared for festivals. This dish can be made without using onion and garlic, for some auspicious festivals where use of those ingredients may not be allowed.

== Ingredients ==
Apart from eggplant and yogurt, one may use vegetable oil or ghee, mustard seeds, cumin seeds (jeera), fenugreek seeds (methi), fennel seeds (pan mahuri), dry chilli (sukhila lanka maricha), curry leaves (bhrusanga patra), ginger, green chilli, salt and sugar.

== Variations ==
Some variation of Dahi baigana is seen in Kashmiri cuisine as the Kashmiri version adds spice paste and a lot of chilli powder to the dish. Such preparation is somewhat golden rather than being yellowish white.

== See also ==
- Odia cuisine
- Recipe of Dahi Baigana
