= Ou khatta =

Type of chutney

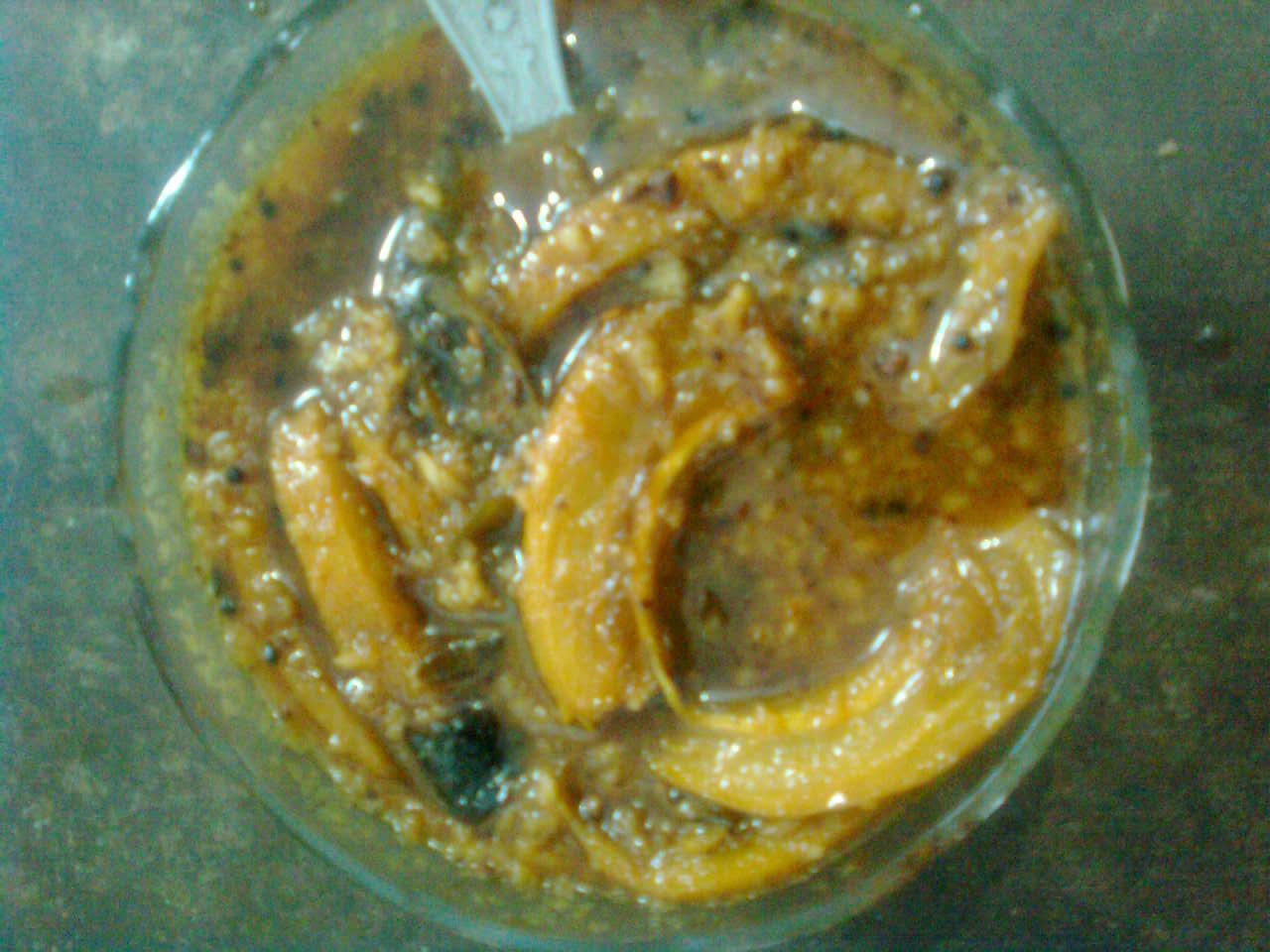
- Ouu khatta
- Type: chutney or marmalade
- Place of origin: India
- Region or state: Odisha and Assam
- Main ingredients: elephant apple

Ou khatta (Odia: ଔ ଖଟା) is a sweet and sour chutney or marmalade made of ou (elephant apple; Dillenia indica) in jaggery, in the Indian state of Odisha, mostly in the post-monsoon season. Sometimes ou is added to dal or dalma. It is rich in vitamin C.

== History ==
According to Odia legends, the ou plant was only found in Paradise. The goddess Parvati brought it to earth along with the betel vine.

== Variants and methods ==
As it is a sour fruit, it is cooked with jaggery or sugar. People who do not like sugar also prepare it with tangy mustard and garlic paste-based gravy, along with red chilli powder.

== See also ==
- Dillenia indica
- Oriya cuisine
