= Chakuli pitha =

Indian rice-based fermented cake

Chakuli Pitha
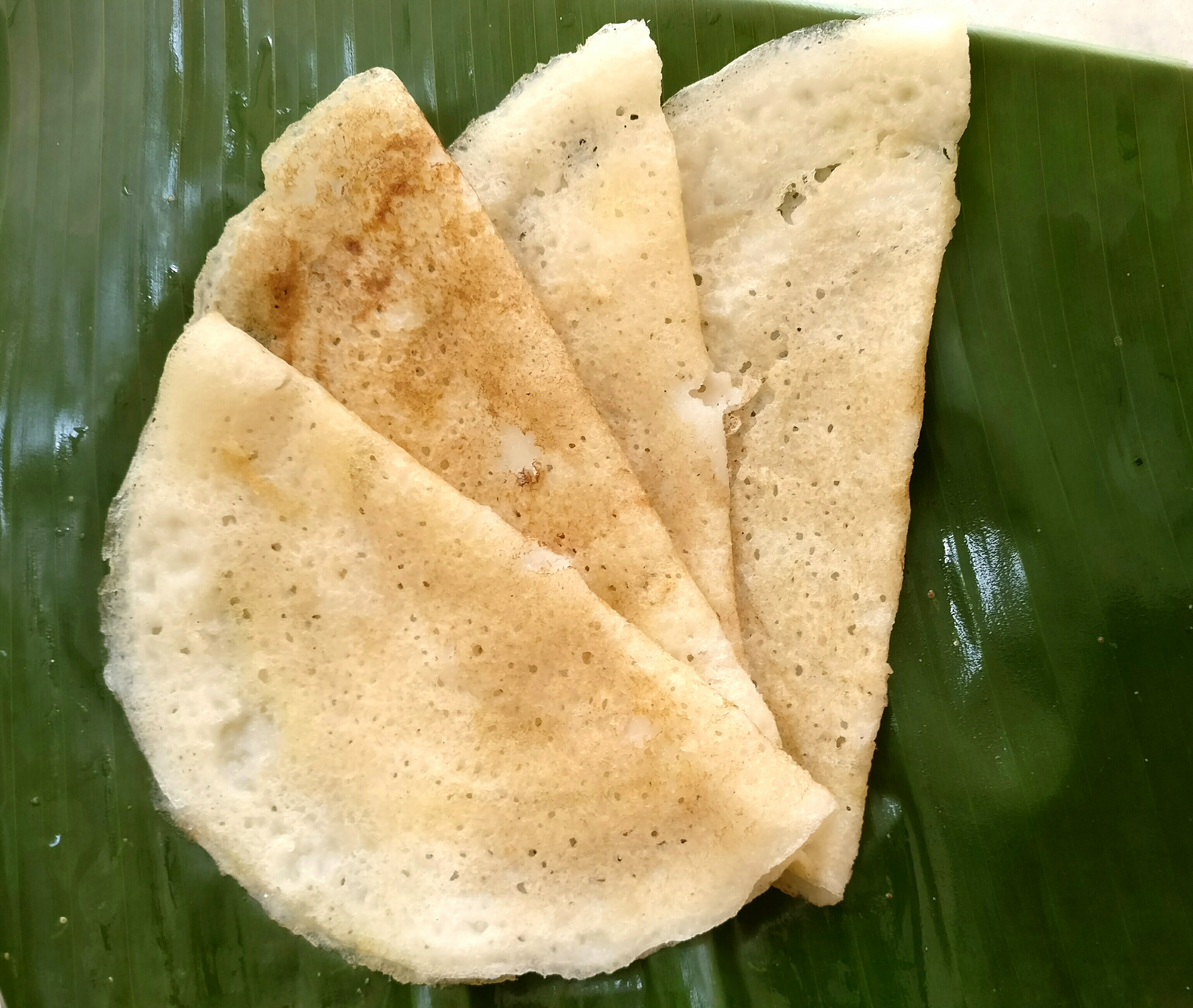
- Type: Rice cake
- Course: Cake
- Place of origin: India
- Region or state: Odisha
- Main ingredients: Rice flour, black gram, refined edible oil (ghee or mustard oil), salt

Chåkuḷi Piṭhā (Odia: ଚକୁଳି ପିଠା) is a flat Odia rice-based fermented cake traditionally popular in the regions of Odisha state in India. It is prepared and served during festivals.

== Preparation ==
The dish is prepared using rice flour, black gram, refined edible oil (preferably ghee or mustard oil), and salt.

Rice flour and black gram are mixed with warm water and salt to create the batter. The batter is covered and left to ferment for several hours. The batter is then poured on a skillet to create round flat cakes.

Chakuli pitha can be served on its own or paired with side dishes including guguni, sambhar, sugar, jaggery, tea, milk, vegetables, and mutton.

== Variation ==
There are multiple variations of chakuli pitha. Saru Chakuli (ସରୁ ଚକୁଳି) is a thinner variation similar to dosa. Burha Chakuli (ବୁଢ଼ା ଚକୁଳି) is a thicker variation made mixed with jaggery, paneer and grated coconut.

== See also ==
- Odia cuisine
- Dosa
