= Chhena Jhili =

Odia sweet dish

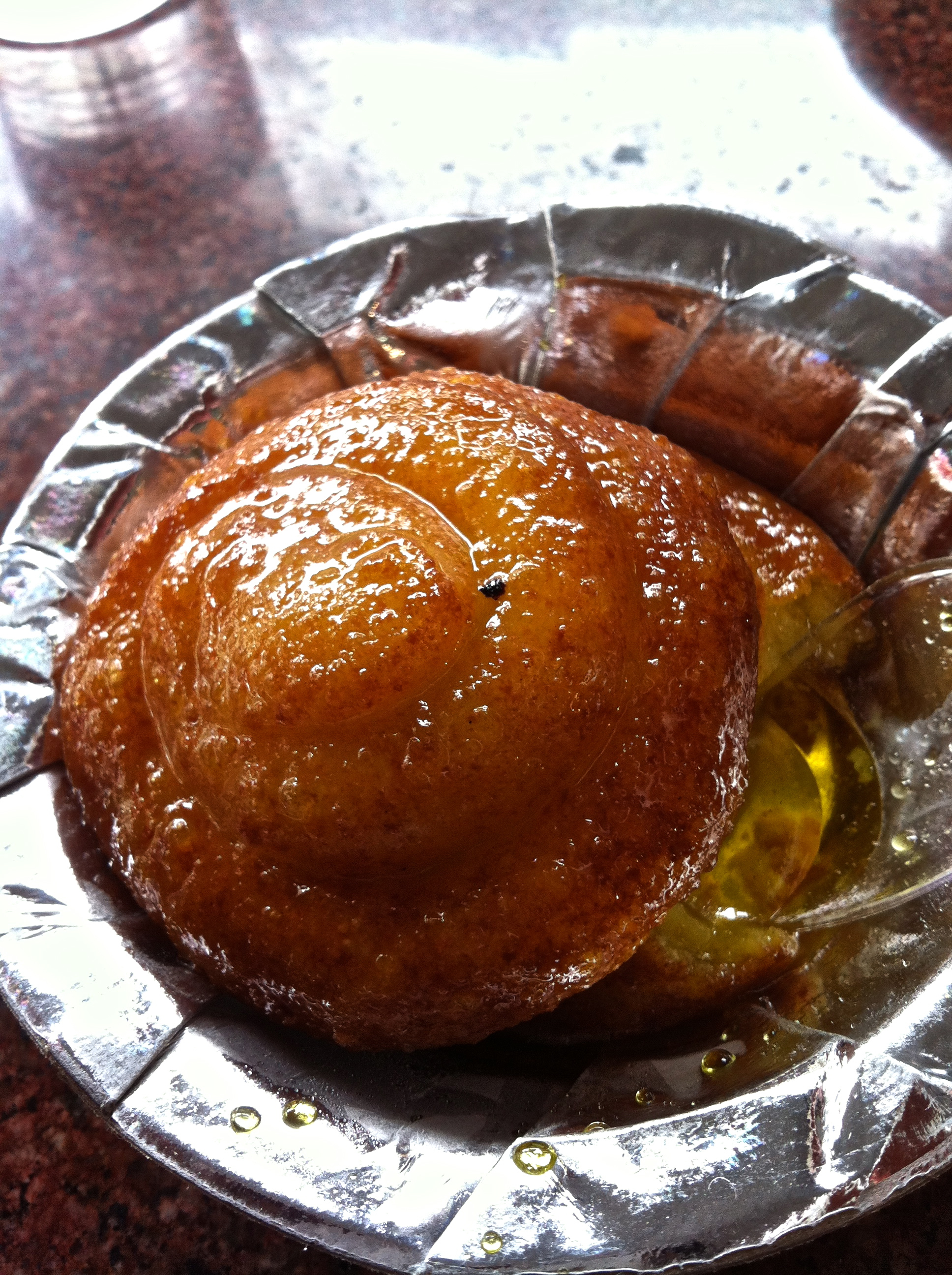
- Chhena Jhili
- Type: sweet
- Course: Dessert
- Place of origin: Nimapada, Odisha, India
- Region or state: Nimapada, Odisha
- Main ingredients: Cheese, syrup

Chhena jhili (Odia: ଛେନାଝିଲି) is a popular dessert consisting of fried chhena (cheese curds) and sugar syrup from Odisha, India. It originates from Nimapada in Puri district. Its preparation has been compared to gulab jamun.

Besides chhena and sugar, other ingredients in the dish include wheat flour, cardamom, and ghee.
