= Manda pitha =

Steamed dumpling prepared in Odisha, India

Kancha Manda pitha
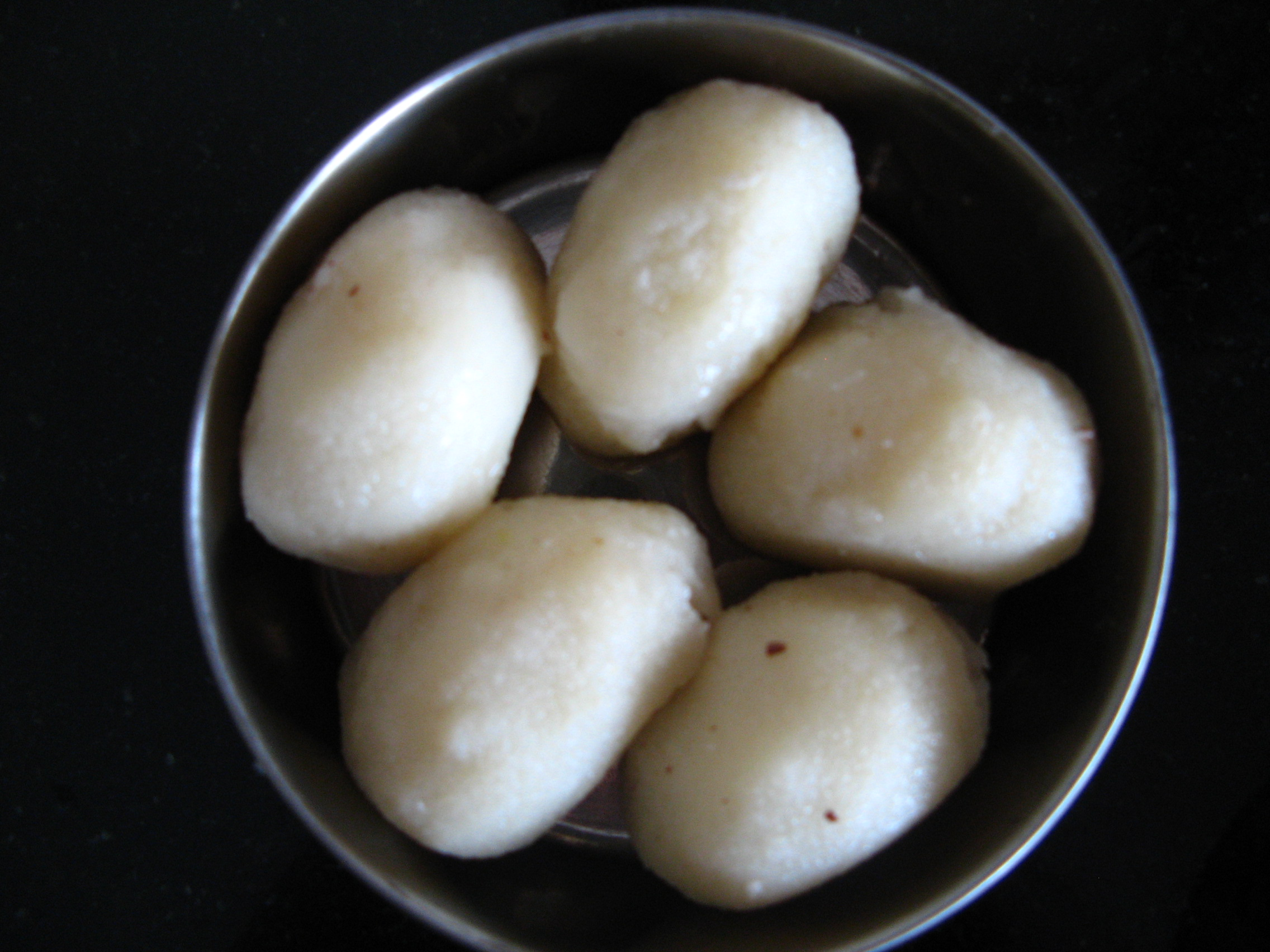
- Sijha manda pitha
- Type: Pitha
- Place of origin: India
- Region or state: Odisha
- Main ingredients: Rice flour, coconut, moong, jaggery, black pepper, chhena

Manda pitha (Odia: ମଣ୍ଡା ପିଠା) is a steamed dumpling which is prepared in Odisha, India during festivals falling in monsoon and post-monsoon seasons like Manabasa Gurubara, Durga Puja, Kumar Purnima or Rakhi Purnima. The pitha resembles modak of Maharashtra and Kozhakkattai of South India. The name is derived from the Odia word "Mandeiba" (Odia: ମଣ୍ଡେଇବା) means "to place" or "to put" or "to dump". It suggests the action of putting a rice bowl into warm water "Mandeiba" to make Manda peetha.In western parts of Odisha, this dish is made of suji shell with a coconut filling. Instead of steaming, it is deep fried.

== Preparation ==
The outer covering is made of steamed rice flour and the inner filling consists of coconut, moong, jaggery, black pepper and Chhena.

Making a manda pitha

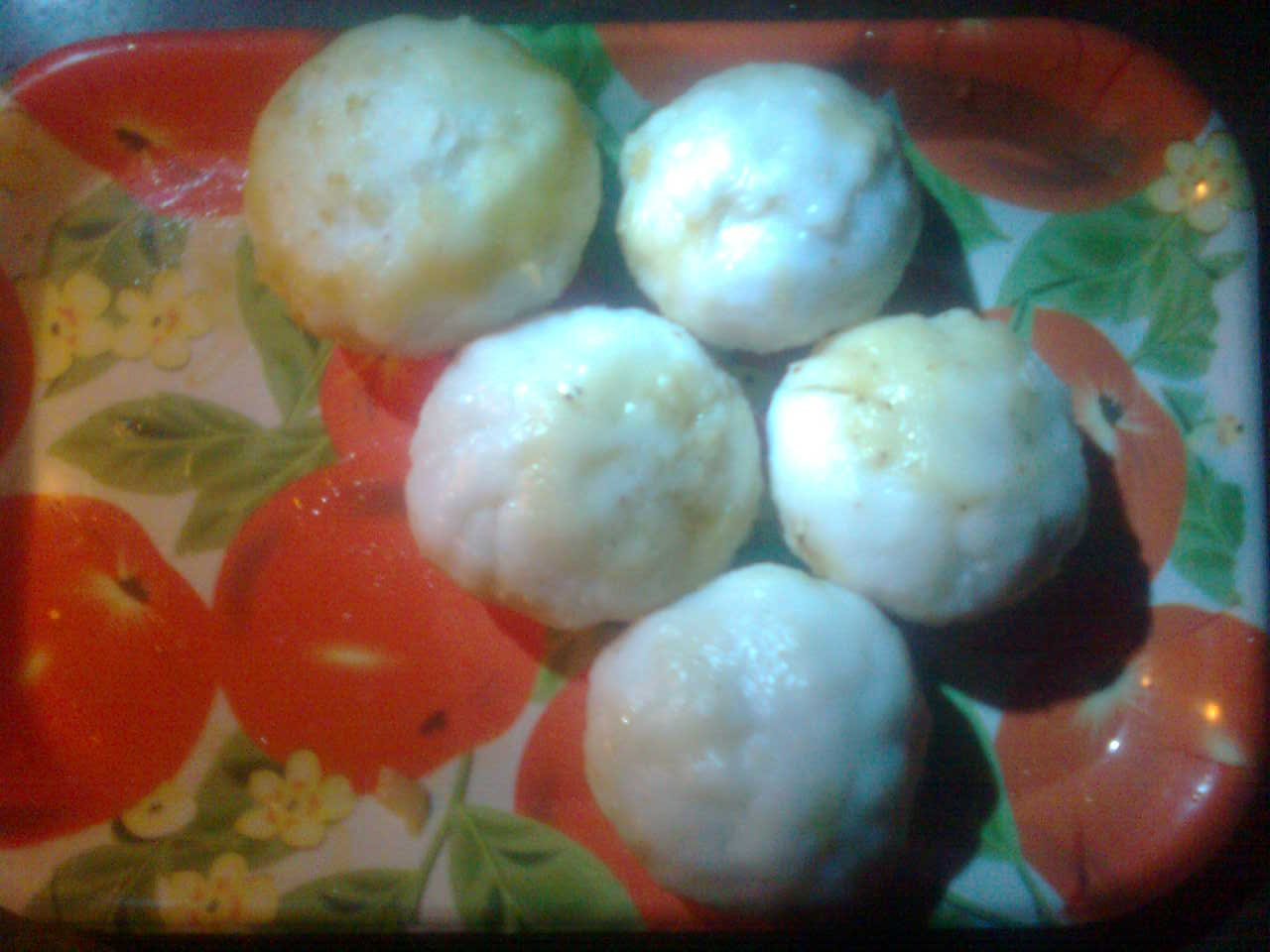
Manda pitha prepared during Kumar Purnima

== See also ==
- Kakara pitha
- List of Indian breads
- List of steamed foods
- Manda Pitha
