= Kakara pitha =

India deep-fried cake

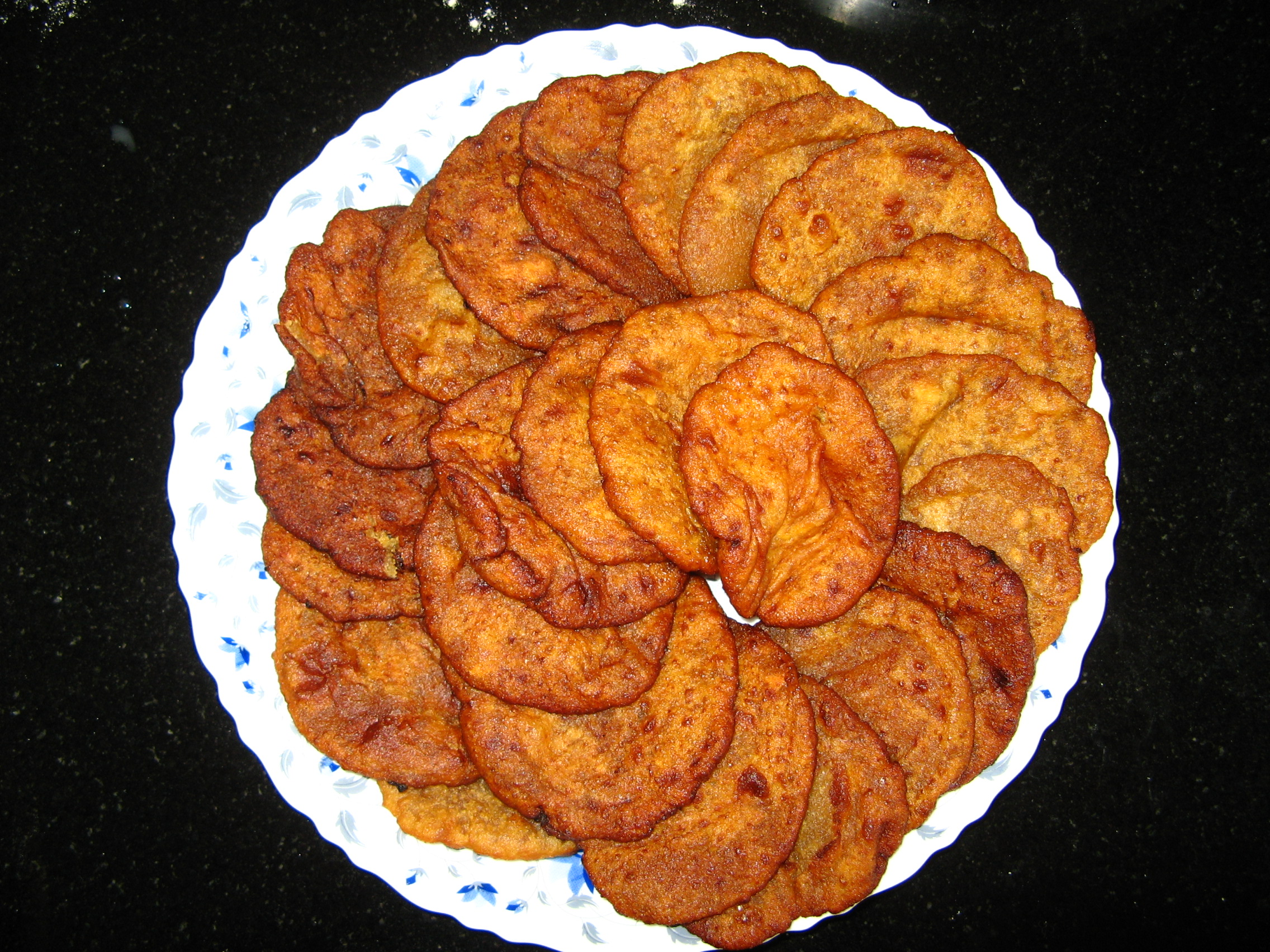
- Kakara made of wheat flour
- Course: Dessert
- Place of origin: India
- Region or state: Odisha
- Serving temperature: Hot or cold
- Main ingredients: Wheat flour, sugar, coconut, cardamom, chhena

Kakara pitha (Odia: କାକରା ପିଠା)is a sweet deep-fried cake from Odisha, India. It is offered to temple deities and served hot or cold on many festivals.

== Ingredients ==
- Atta (Wheat Flour) – 300 g
- Chinni (Sugar) -250 g
- Nadia (Coconut) – ½ a Coconut(shredded)
- Gujurati( Cardamom) – 4 pcs
- Chhena-100 g
- Edible camphor-a pinch
- Black pepper- little and crushed
- Luna (Salt) – As per taste
- Refine Tela(Refined Oil)- for deep frying

== See also ==
- List of deep fried foods
- Odia cuisine
- Pitha
