= Ghugni =

Indian snack

Ghugni Guguni
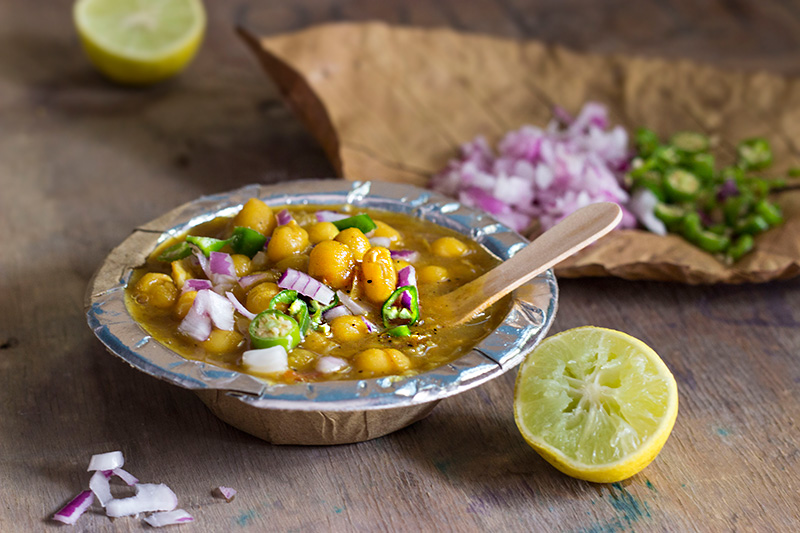
- Guguni
- Type: Curry
- Course: Main course
- Place of origin: India
- Associated cuisine: Indian cuisine, Bangladeshi cuisine, Nepalese cuisine, Trinidadian and Tobagonian cuisine, Fijian cuisine
- Serving temperature: Hot
- Main ingredients: Dried yellow peas or dried white peas, Indian spices, Nepali Himalayan salts, turmeric powder

Ghugni (Bengali: ঘুগনি, Bhojpuri: 𑂐𑂳𑂐𑂳𑂢𑂲) or Guguni (Odia: ଗୁଗୁନି) is a dish made of peas or chickpeas in Nepal, Bangladesh, and Odisha, West Bengal, Jharkhand, Bihar, and Uttar Pradesh in India. Different variations of the dish use different types of peas or chickpeas, such as black gram, green peas, or white peas. It is usually eaten for breakfast with toasted bread or puri, but can also be served as the main course for lunch or dinner. It can be made either with or without the use of onion and garlic.

In Odisha, guguni is usually eaten with puri, upma, chakuli, idli, samosa (singada), bara, or pithas.

(Note: It is especially popular in Eastern Nepal, in Eastern India (Indian States of Bihar, Jharkhand, Odisha, West Bengal), Northeast India (Indian states of Assam and Tripura) and in Bangladesh.)

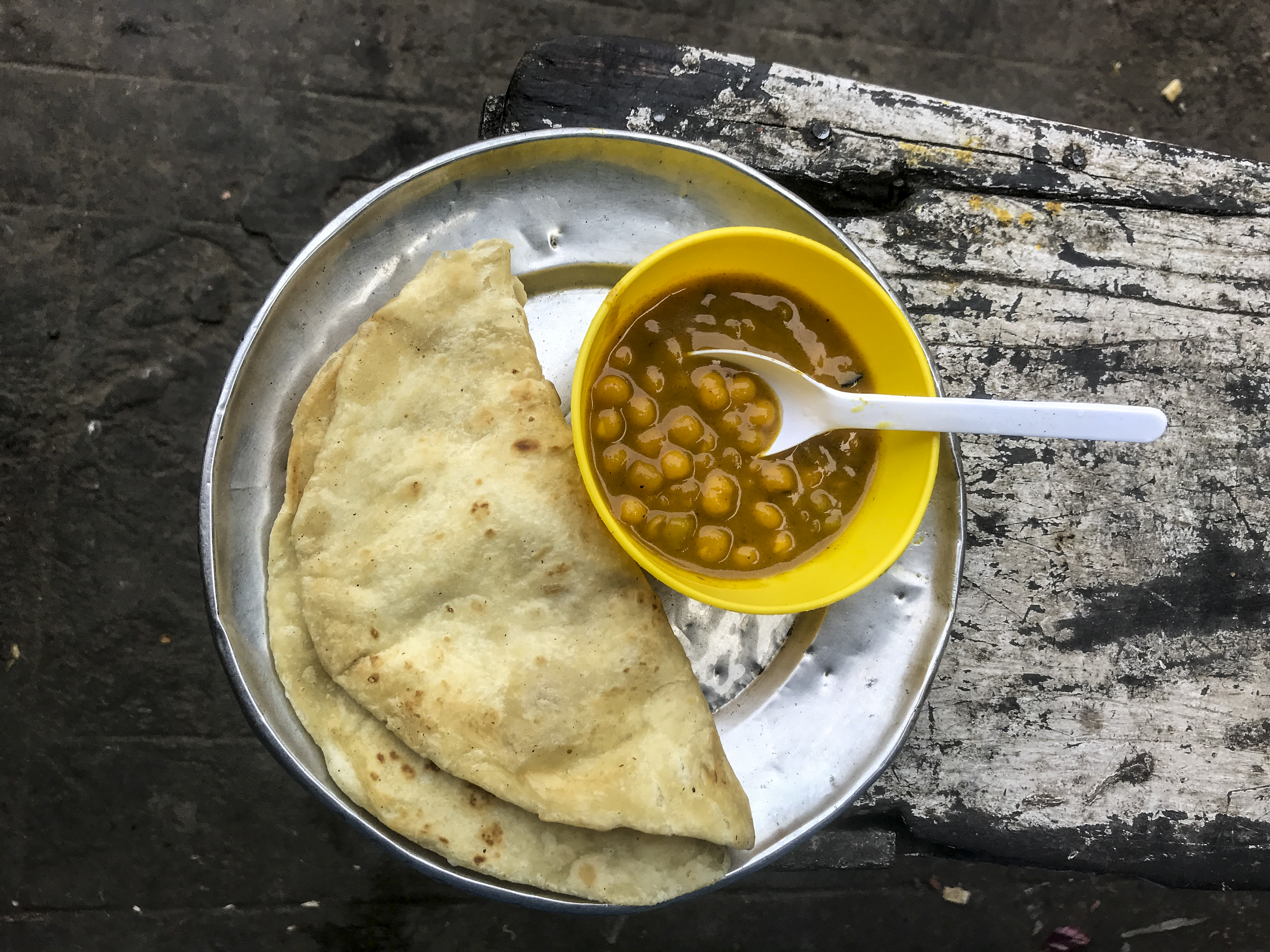
Ghugni with paratha in Kolkata, West Bengal

== Preparation ==
The peas are soaked overnight and then boiled in water. The peas are added to a gravy that includes coconut, ginger paste, garlic paste, cumin, tamarind paste, and cilantro.

It is then served with puffed rice (kurmura) and at times with hot onion pakoda or bhajiya. Ghugni is often served with dhuska, a fermented rice-lentil dish.

Guguni is one of the staple breakfast items in Odisha, where it is often served with puri, mudhi (muri, murmura, puffed rice) or other Odia snacks such as bara and singada. Guguni can be prepared without onion and garlic as well.

In Calcutta, ghugni is often eaten with puris.

== Variation ==
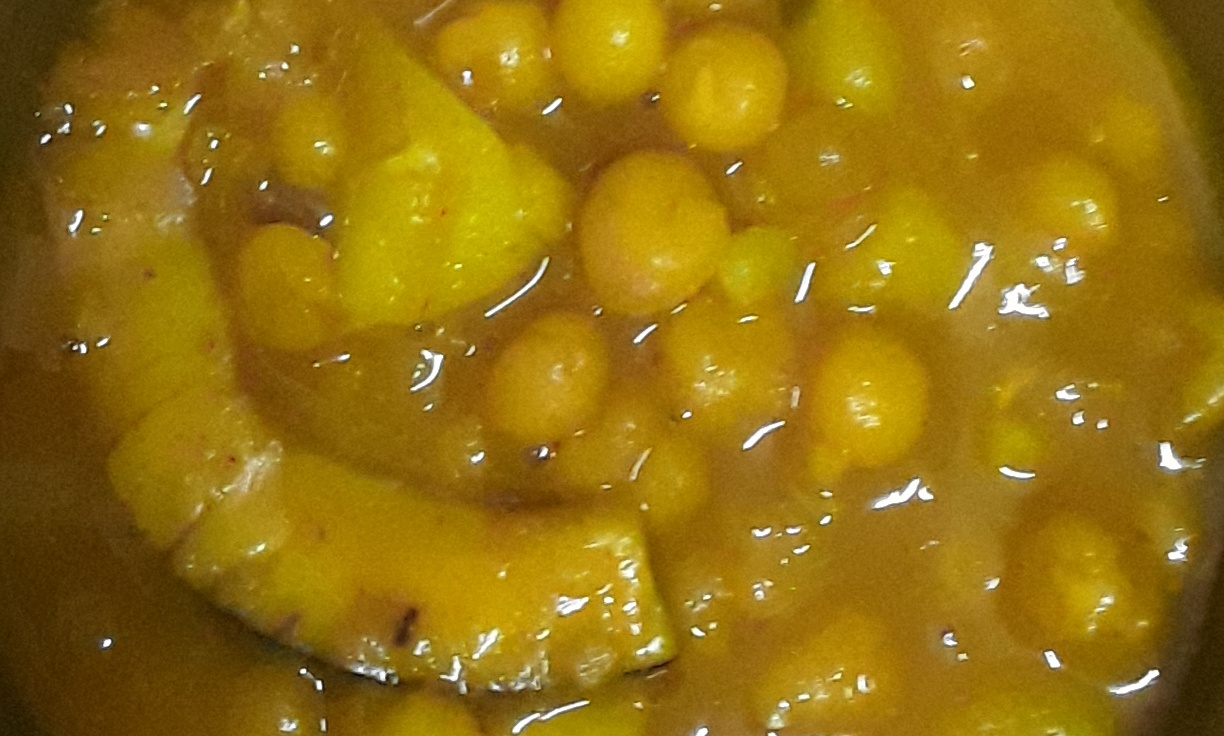
Ghugni of West Bengal (with coconut and potato slices), made from dry white peas

In Bihar, green chickpeas or freshly harvested green peas are used for the dish. They are lightly pan-fried in mustard oil with some cumin seeds and green chillies and are not curried like eastern Indian versions. In Bengal, ghugni is made from dry white peas.

Some versions include meat, such as goat or even lamb or chicken. The meat is usually minced or in bite-sized pieces, mostly for flavoring. "Mangsher ghugni" or meat keema ghugni has been described as a "Kolkata trademark".

== Assorted combinations ==
=== Ghugni and dhuska ===
In the states of Bihar and Jharkhand and Eastern Uttar Pradesh, ghugni is often paired with dhuska, which is made by deep-frying batter of fermented rice and dal. Ghugni is most commonly made using kala chana (black chickpeas). The combination of ghugni and dhuska is popular in Bhojpuri, Magadhi and Maithil cuisines.

== See also ==
- Chhole
- Bhel
