= Mahaprasad (Jagannath Temple) =

Food offerings to Jagannath in the Temple of Puri

Mahaprasad (Odia: ମହାପ୍ରସାଦ) refers to the sanctified food offered to Lord Jagannath in the Jagannath Temple, Puri, Odisha, India. It is an integral part of Jagannatha worship and a unique cultural tradition blending devotion, community, and culinary heritage. Revered as divine and egalitarian, Mahaprasad is consumed by devotees irrespective of caste, creed, or religion.

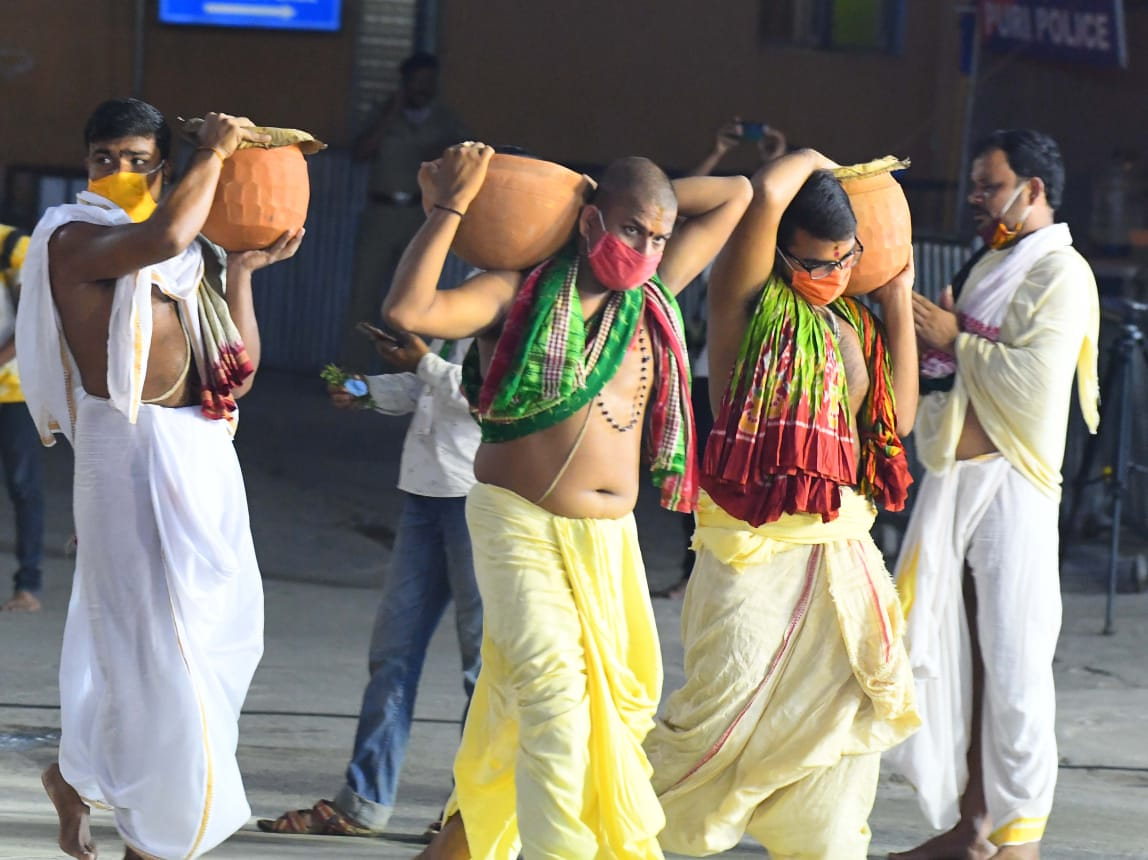
Clay pots used in Jagannatha's rituals

== Etymology ==
The word Mahaprasad is derived from the Sanskrit roots maha (great) and prasāda (grace or offering). It signifies the highest form of divine grace received as food after being offered to the deity.

== Religious significance ==
In the Jagannatha tradition, food becomes Mahaprasad only after being offered first to Lord Jagannatha and then re-offered to Devi Bimala, a unique practice called Bimala Prasad. Only after this second offering is it deemed fit for devotees to consume. It is believed to possess spiritual potency and is consumed as a blessing, not merely food.

== Daily food offerings ==
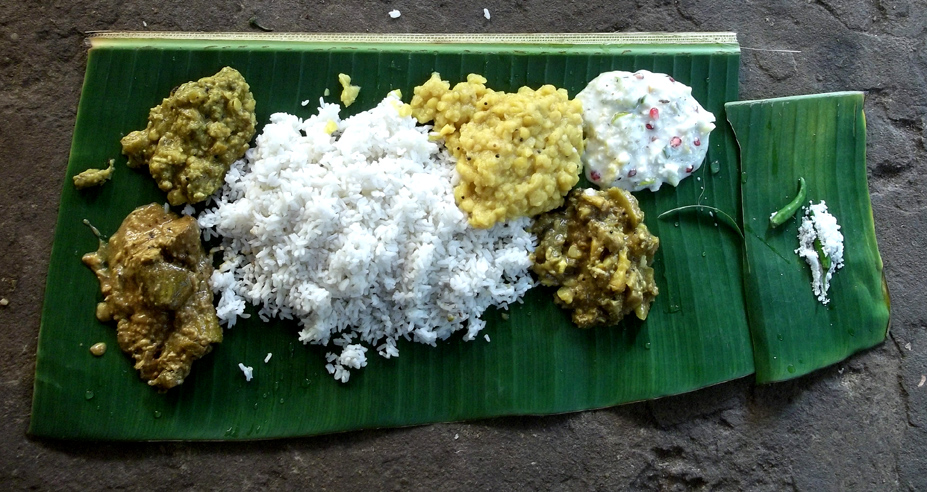
Mahaprasad served on a plantain leaf

Six times a day, different kinds of Pitha, vegetables, rice and dal are offered to Jagannath and his sibling deities.

== Types of Mahaprasad ==
Mahaprasad is classified into two major categories:

=== Sukhila Bhoga (refers to the dry sweet items) ===
This refers to dry items such as:

- Khai – puffed rice
- Nadia Kora – coconut slices
- Jagannath Ballava – a sweet pancake-like item
- Kora Khai – puffed rice mixed with jaggery
- Gaja – deep-fried sweet

These are often distributed as takeaways or sent to devotees across regions.

=== Sankhudi Bhoga (Wet cooked prasad/Abhada) ===
Cooked items are offered in earthen pots and include:

- Anna – plain rice
- Dali – lentils
- Besara – vegetables cooked in mustard paste
- Khechudi – spiced rice and lentils
- Saga – leafy vegetables
- Pakhala – fermented rice

These items are typically consumed in the Ananda Bazaar on the temple premises.

=== Nirmalya ===
"Nirmalya" refers to dried Mahaprasad rice, which devotees often take home as a token of Lord Jagannath’s blessings. It is considered highly auspicious and is sometimes given to the dying, believed to ensure a place in heaven

== Preparation ==
Mahaprasad is cooked in the world's largest kitchen inside the Jagannath Temple complex called Rosa Ghara. The preparation is carried out by temple-designated cooks called Suaras and Maha-Suaras using traditional earthen pots and firewood. The process is strictly ritualistic and follows prescribed codes, including the prohibition of onion, garlic, and any form of tasting before offering.

== Unique features ==
- All Mahaprasad is vegetarian and follows strict Sattvik norms.
- It is believed that the food never goes to waste, regardless of the number of devotees.
- Once offered, Mahaprasad can be consumed by anyone, regardless of caste, creed, or religion.
- Mahaprasad is distributed in a communal setup where everyone eats together, fostering unity.

== Cultural importance ==
Mahaprasad is a powerful symbol of equality and unity. Devotees from all backgrounds eat together at Ananda Bazaar, breaking social barriers and fostering brotherhood. It plays a significant role in various life ceremonies among Odias, including births, weddings, and even funerals. It symbolises purity, equality, and divine grace and is deeply rooted in the socio-religious life of Odisha.

== Beliefs and legends ==
According to temple legends:

- The goddess Mahalakshmi is said to oversee the temple kitchen herself.
- Despite no external temperature control, the food remains fresh and palatable.
- The exact quantity of rice cooked each day inexplicably matches the demand.

== Distribution ==
Mahaprasad is sold at the temple's open food court, Ananda Bazaar, and is also transported in large quantities during major festivals such as Ratha Yatra, Snana Yatra, and Chandan Yatra.

== Mahaprasad Beyond Puri ==
While many temples and households across Odisha prepare similar offerings, the term Mahaprasad is reserved exclusively for food sanctified inside the Jagannatha Temple, Puri. Replicas may be referred to as bhoga but not Mahaprasad.

== See also ==
- Bhoga
- Jagannath
- Jagannath Temple, Puri
- Ratha Yatra (Puri)
- Cuisine of Odisha
- Gajapati
- Gajapati Dynasty
