= Ogi, Angul =

Ogi
- Village
- Nickname: Ogi-Para
- Location in Odisha, India Ogi (India)
- Coordinates: 20.8489499°N 84.8804377°E
- Country: India
- State: Odisha
- District: Angul

Government
  - Type: Panchayat
  - Body: Legislations
- Elevation: 257 m (843 ft)

Population (2014)
  - Total: ▲2,275

Languages
  - Official: Odia
  - Languages Spoken: Odia
- Time zone: UTC+5:30 (IST)
- Postal code: 759127
- Sex ratio: 9 ♂/♀
- Nearest city(s): Angul, Sambalpur, Jarapada
- Climate: according to weather (Köppen)
- Avg. summer temperature: 47 °C (117 °F)
- Avg. winter temperature: 8 °C (46 °F)
- Website: odisha.gov.in

Ogi is a village located in Angul district, in the Indian state of Odisha. The Village of Ogi which is often called Ogi-Para because of its close proximity to Para village is well known from the British colonial era. Notable People including Pabitra Mohan Pradhan, Sarangadhar Das, and Mahatma Gandhi had also visited the village in its history.

The village Ogi is surrounded by a green belt with high rising mountains and is famous for its traditional Odia culture with festivities throughout the year. Despite being a typical Odissan village, Ogi still boosts her rich religious customs associated with Budha Thakura traditions believed to have started centuries ago. It is said that there was a leisure palace of the last Khonds or Kandha chieftain called Anu Kandha in Ogi and the area was a constant point of watch by the British government because the tribal chieftain was the only one who did not succumb to the alien power in the region.

The village is 28 km from the district headquarters Angul and is accessible by surface transport. Till 2018, National Highway 42 was two kilometers away from the village merging at two places namely at Jarapada and Kanjara. But Now, Highways constructed and become the National Highway 55 at Jarapada and Kanjara two kilometers away from Ogi. The nearest railway station Jarapada is about two and half kilometers away. There is regular private and public bus services available from Ogi to the district headquarters. Some of the adjacent villages connecting to Ogi are Para, Jarapada, Tukuda, Kanjara, Durgapur and Antulia.

The village institutions in Ogi include a post office, a primary school, a high school, a Grama panchayat Office, an ANM Center. There are few minor irrigation projects in the village irrigation especially during summer season. The area is covered by several Indian cellular services such as Airtel, Aircel, BSNL, Vodafone and Idea Cellular, Jio.

== Geography ==
Ogi is surrounded mostly by forests, farmlands and hills. It is situated almost in the middle of the district of Angul. The road diverting from Kanjara passes through Ogi all the way to the famous Crocodile Sanctuary at Tikarapada. The same road also connects to other villages like Tainsi and Jagannthapur located at the interior side of Antualia forest. Besides, it is also possible to reach famous hot water spring located at Deulajhari by passing through Ogi via Paikasahi.

== Demographics ==
The population of Ogi proper is about 2,500. However Ogi Gram panchayat as a whole has about 5,000 in population. According to the Odisha state Chief Electoral Office sources, Ogi village has a male population of 1,151 and female population of 1,124 making the total count to 2,275.

== Education ==
There is one Upper Primary School, one High School, one Primary school situated in the village. Recently, a Senior Secondary School (+2) has been approved by the government of Odisha for the village. The nearest college to the village is Patitapabana Mahavidyalaya in Jarapada, although pupils from the village also commute to Government Autonomous College, Angul and Janata College, Boinda for higher studies.

== Culture ==
There is a famous saying among the Odias, that "Odias have 13 festivals in 12 months". This is typical of most of the villages in Odisha and Ogi is no exception to this. Major festivals in the village include Dusshera, Kartik Poornima, and Shivaratri. However Ogi is most famous in the Angul district for its annual Dola Purnima/Phalguna Yatra or Agara Jatra as popularly known. Other Odia religious festivals like Pana Sankranti, Hanuman Jayanti, Akshaya Tritiya, Raja Parba, Raksha Bandhan, Khudurukuni Osha, Ganesha Puja/Vinayaka Chaturthi, Garvana Sankranti, Kumara Purnima, Deepavali, Prathamastami, Manabasa/Mahalaxmi Gurubara, Pausa Purnima, Makara Sankranti, Saraswati Puja and Holi are observed ordinarily and serially according to the Odia Calendar that follows the regular Hindu calendar.

== Food ==
Typical Oriya foods include rice, tomatoes, potatoes, dal like mung, peanuts, vegetables similar to yam, bitter gourd (called Momordica charantia), Dillenia Speciosa, pumpkin, white gourd (winter melon), red gourd, spinach and sweet potato, Trichosanthes cucumerina, Luffa, okra, cauliflowers, cabbages, eggplants and arum can all be found in any Oriya family's backyard.

One dish, Pakhala, made from a mix of boiled rice and water, is eaten with boiled potatoes mixed with green chili pepper, curd, salt, and onions. Biri chaula chakuli pitha consisting of Vigna mungo and rice. It is normally eaten for breakfast. Chakuli pitha can be eaten with Santula or Dalma. Pitha and is the main sweet dish at every festival they celebrate. There are different types of pitha made out of rice, namely Aarisa pitha, Manda Pitha, Kakara Pitha, Enduri Pitha, Chakuli Pitha, Poda Pitha, Chitau Pitha, Tala Pitha and much more.

=== Ogi Cuisine ===
Alu Potala Rasa, Bela Pana, Chadachadi, Chakuli pitha, Chandrakanti, Chhena, Chhena gaja, Chhena jalebi, Chhena Jhili, Chhena kheeri, Chhena poda, Chhencheda, Chingudi Jhola, Dahi baigana, Dahi machha, Enduri Pitha, Gajar ka halwa, Ghugni, Handia (drink), Ilish, Kakara pitha, Khaja, Kheer, Khichdi, Khira sagara, Khiramohana, Kora Khai, Luchi, Fish, Bihana, Machher Jhol, Manda pitha, Mathapuli, Mishti doi, Ouu khatta, Pakhala, Pitha, Podo pitha, Rasabali, Saag, Samosa, Santula, Sattu, Baigan Bharta are a few of the many varieties of culinary specialties to be found in Ogi.

== Sports ==
There is a cricket ground near High School in the village where children can play cricket and other types of games, such as marbles, Kabaddi, and Gilli-danda, Volleyball. The people of Ogi also organize cricket tournaments every year to promote the sport and for both players and spectators to enjoy.

== Health ==
The lack of a permanent site for an Auxiliary nurse midwife center resulted in an overall low level of health of the villagers. Ogi is a panchayat but not medical facility. The nearby Primary hospital are present in Jarapada which is at least 5 km-6 km from the Village. Every Year, the Blood Donation Camp held at Ogi by Government for the Blood donors from the village.

== Economy ==
Agriculture is the main livelihood of the village populace and the major population living in the village belongs to CHASA community, whose traditional occupation is farming. However marginal land holding and lack of proper irrigation facilities with heavy dependency on rain water for farming often causes great hardship for the farmers. There are other occupational groups such as black smith, oil producers, gold smith, traders, and priestly class living together in the village as a single unit. In recent years, due to industrialization of Odisha, a large number of youths are leaving farming occupation and getting engaged in other industrial activities.

== Tourist attractions ==
=== Pitabali Waterfall ===
Pitabali Waterfall is a seasonal waterfall located in the forested hilly region near the village of Ogi in Angul district, Odisha, India. The waterfall is formed by rain-fed streams originating from the surrounding hill ranges and is most active during the monsoon and post-monsoon seasons.

The area around Pitabali Waterfall is characterised by dense vegetation, natural rock formations, and a relatively undisturbed environment. The site is frequented by local residents and visitors from nearby villages, particularly during periods of increased water flow. The waterfall also holds local significance and is associated with regional folklore.

Access to the waterfall is primarily through village roads and forest paths from Ogi and nearby settlements. The site has limited tourism infrastructure and remains largely uncommercialised, preserving its natural landscape. Visitors are advised to take precautions during the monsoon season due to slippery terrain and strong currents.
