= Ogi =

Ogi may refer to:

== People ==
- Adolf Ogi (born 1942), Swiss politician
- Aritatsu Ogi (小城 得達; born 1942), Japanese football player
- Chikage Oogi (扇 千景; 1933–2023), Japanese actress and politician
- Darko Ostojić (born 1965), nicknamed Ogi, Bosnian musician and actor
- Kota Ogi (荻 晃太; born 1983), Japanese football player
- Ogi Ogas (born 1970s), American writer
- Ogi (singer), American singer and songwriter

== Places ==
- Ogi, Angul, Odisha, India
- Ogi, Ōita, a former town in Oita, Japan
- Ogi, Niigata, a town located in Sado Island, Niigata Prefecture, Japan
- Ogi, Saga, a city in Saga, Japan

== Other uses ==
- Ogi (food), a fermented cereal pudding
- OGI School of Science and Engineering, Hillsboro, Oregon, United States
- Ogi (character), one of the main characters of Bobinogs
- Orchestra Giovanile Italiana

== See also ==
- Ōgi Station (disambiguation)
