= Durgapur (disambiguation) =

Durgapur may refer to:

- Durgapur, West Bengal, a city in West Bengal, India
  - Durgapur subdivision, the subdivision in which the aforementioned city is located
  - Durgapur Barrage, across the Damodar River
  - Durgapur Purba (Vidhan Sabha constituency)
  - Durgapur Paschim (Vidhan Sabha constituency)
  - Durgapur (Lok Sabha constituency) - now defunct
  - Bardhaman-Durgapur (Lok Sabha constituency)
- Durgapur, Angul, a village in Orissa, India
- Durgapur Upazila, Netrokona Bangladesh
- Durgapur Upazila, Rajshahi Bangladesh
- Durgapur, Maharashtra
- Durgapur, Nepal
