= Panta bhat =

Rice-based dish originating in Bengal

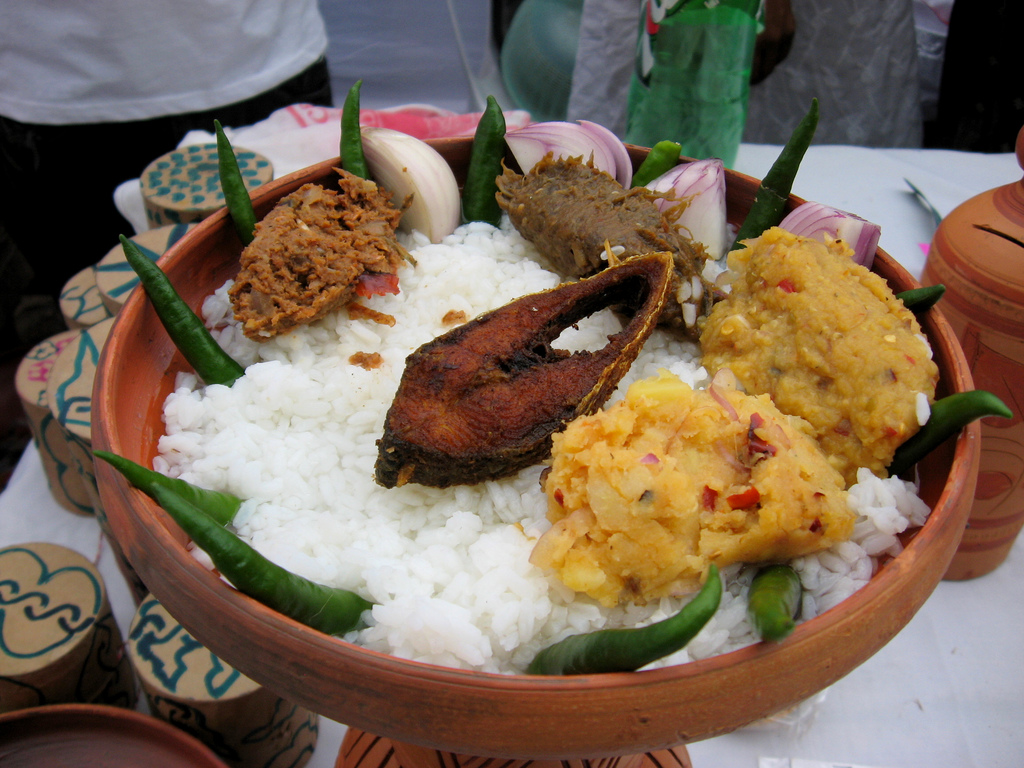
- Panta Ilish - a traditional platter of Panta bhat with fried Ilish slice, supplemented with dried fish (shutki), pickle (achar), dal, green chillies and onion - is a popular serving for the Pahela Baishakh festival.
- Alternative names: poita bhat (Standard Assamese), ponta bhat (Kamrupi Assamese, Kamtapuri), zokra bhat (Kamrupi Assamese), zokora bhat (Central Assamese), bore basi (Chhattisgarhi, pazhaya Sadam (Tamil), pazhamkanji/pazhakanji (Malayalam) pazhamkanji.
- Course: Main course
- Place of origin: Bangladesh; Eastern India
- Region or state: Bengal region Assam
- Associated cuisine: Bengali cuisine Assamese cuisine
- Main ingredients: Rice, water
- Variations: Pakhala

Panta bhat or poita bhat (Bengali: পান্তা ভাত pàntà bhàt; Assamese: পঁইতা ভাত poĩta bhat or পন্তা ভাত ponta bhat) consists of cooked rice soaked and fermented in water. The liquid part is known as Toraṇi in Odia. It is a rice-based dish prepared by soaking rice, generally leftover, in water overnight. Traditionally served in the morning with salt, onion, chili and Aloo Makha/Alu Pitika (mashed potato). It is consumed in Bangladesh and the eastern Indian states of West Bengal, Odisha (Pakhala), Jharkhand, Chhattisgarh, Assam, Tripura. Panta bhat with Ilish (Hilsha) is the national dish of Bangladesh. It is a popular dish on the day of Pahela Baishakh or Bengali new year. It is also served on the day of Ranna pujo , a day before Viswakarma Puja. It has been described in documents from 17th century, while the dish Pakhala from Odisha documents back to 10th century CE, and is known as the origin of this dish. Panta bhat has more micronutrients than fresh rice. It is traditionally considered as beneficial in conditions.

== History ==
Anthropologist Tapan Kumar Sanyal argues that proto-Australoid people in parts of South Asia resorted to eating panta bhat because they cooked once a day, in the evening. Fray Sebastien Manrique reported from his visit of Bengal in 17th century that the people of all communities, according to Manrique, were contented then with the daily meal of rice, often panta bhat, salt and green vegetable (shak). The better-off elements of the society consumed ghee, butter, milk and various lacteous preparations and sweetmeats.

Rice researcher Mahabub Hossain of International Rice Research Institute explains that in the past, people engaged in farm work preferred bold and brown rice which is more suited for watered rice, and also provides more nutrition. But, as more people shifted to urban centers the demand for farm work, brown rice and watered rice decreased. In these times of polished rice, the popularity of rice varieties like Lal Swarna and White Swarna is often driven by their suitability for panta bhat.

It is unknown when Pakhala was first included in the daily diet of Eastern India, but it was included in the recipe of Lord Jagannath Temple of Puri circa 10th century. The word Pakhaḷa was used in the Odia poems of Arjuna Das in his literary work Kåḷpålåtā(Odia: କଳ୍ପଲତା) during 1520-1530 CE.

== Preparation ==
There are many variations of the dish though all are made by soaking cooked rice in water overnight. Rice is boiled the usual way. Then phaen or starch is strained away. Rice is cooled in air temperature for 3–4 hours. Then cool water is added in a way that about an inch of water rises above the rice. Rice is generally covered with a light piece of fabric. 12–24 hours later panta bhat is ready. Panta bhat retains its taste for 2/3 days. The fluid portion is called amani or torani, and may be specially prepared. Care must be taken to cover the dish during the long soaking to avoid contamination.

The soaked rice is usually eaten in the morning with salt, lime, chili (either raw or roasted) and onions (sliced or whole) mostly for flavor. Panta bhat is often served with fried fish or vegetable curry or flattened rice (chira), dried cane or palm molasses (jaggery or guda) and milk curd (doi). Water is discarded before consumption. Sometimes edible oils may be added. Panta bhat or poita bhat is often garnished with mustard oil, onion, chilli, pickle, and served with shutki mach (dried fish), machher jhol (fish curry), especially shorshe Ilish (ilish cooked with mustard seeds), aloo bhorta or aloo pitika (mashed potato), begun bhorta (mashed brinjal) and other bhorta or pitika (mashed food).

A similar dish consumed in the Indian states of Odisha, Jharkhand and Chhattisgarh is known as Pakhala (also pakhal, pokhalo or pakhal bhat). It differs from panta bhat in seasoning as yoghurt is sometimes added prior to the fermentation process. Pazhedhu saadham, meaning "old rice", of Tamil Nadu is another variation of the dish. It is consumed in East and South East Asia as well, and is known as Jiuniang in China.

== Popularity ==
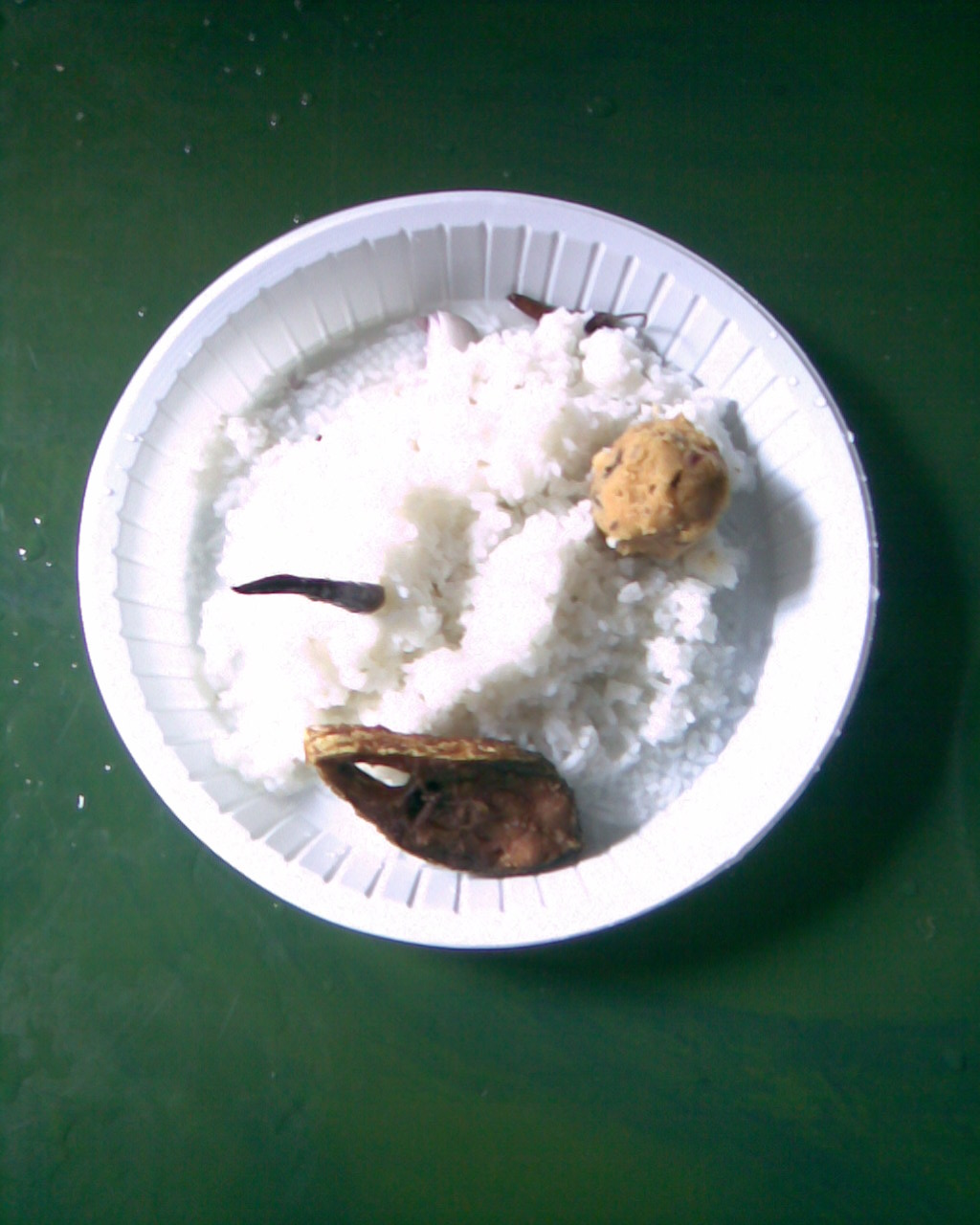
A regular serving of panta bhat

Panta bhat is especially popular in rural areas, generally served with salt, raw onion and green chili. It is usually served as breakfast, though noon or evening consumption is not uncommon. Panta bhat and other low nutrition food are consumed as fillers between meals. Panta bhat is one of the cool dishes popular in Bengal, meaning it helps keep cool during the summer, according to food historian Pritha Sen. This cold and wet food, is suitable for summer mornings, but in winter dry foods, such as chira (flattened rice) and muri (puffed rice) are preferred.

In Bangladesh, it is a part of the Pahela Baishakh (Bengali new year festival) festivities. On that day it is consumed as breakfast by urban people. Panta is also served at high-end eateries in Bangladesh Food-stalls maintained mostly by student groups on fair-grounds also serve panta-ilish. Panta bhat on Pahela Baishakh is often served with fried hilsha (ilish), and students of Pabna Science and Technology University (PUST) assaulted their student counselor for not providing panta-ilish in the Pahela Baishakh of 2014. But, the practice takes a toll on the hilsha population during the breeding season. Since 2016, Bangladesh government banned hilsha fishing and selling in the times of Pahela Baishakh, ministers started urging people to have panta without ilish and social media became rife with calls for panta without ilish. Bengali Muslims prefers to have Panta Bhat as Iftar when they fast during summer to stay hydrated.

Among Hindus of West Bengal, it is consumed during the Ranna Puja (Hindu cooking worship). During Ranna Puja, panta bhat is offered to Manasa the snake goddess along with fried vegetables, yellow pigeon peas cooked with elephant apples, curried ash gourd and fried Hilsa. On the Vijayadashami day of Durga Puja, panta bhat is offered to Durga along with soup of grass pea, fried taro leaves, machher jhol of blue perch and chutney of elephant apple for Sabarna Roy Choudhury Atchala Durga in Kolkata. In Assam, offering dudh panta (milk with stale water-soaked rice) is a part of the marital ritual. Panta bhat is also popular among slum-dwellers of Dhaka because it can be easily eaten only with salt or with an onion or a fried or green chili, without any other requirement.

Most restaurants on NH34, which runs through Krishnanagar, Nadia, serve panta bhat in summer along with kasundi, mustard oil, kaffir lime, green chili, sliced onion, aloo chokha, fried red chili, Poppy seed balls, aloo jhuri bhaja, mango chutney, sour curd, and sweet paan. Nabanno Hyderabad, a Bengali-owned restaurant in Kukatpally, Hyderabad, serve panta bhat all the year round.

=== Proverbs ===
There are many folk rhymes and proverbs about panta bhat: shashuri nai nonod nai kar ba kori dar/agey khai panta bhat sheshe lepi ghar (lit. "no mother-in-law, no sister-in-law, whom do I fear/ shall eat watered rice first then clean the room"), maga bhat tay basi ar panta(lit. "got rice begging, ask not whether stale or watered"), ki katha bolbo sai/panta bhate tak dai (lit. "what do I say, sour curd on watered rice), panta bhate noon jote na/begun poday ghee (lit. "no salt in watered rice/ghee in roasted brinjal"), noon ante panta phuray (lit. "when salt arrives, the panta is finished"), mude mai radhe na/tapta ar panta (lit. "mother does not cook/so why ask hot or cold") and bandir kame yash nai/panta bhate kash nai (lit. "no merit in a maid's work/no fun in watered rice"). In Northeast India, there is a saying Maghar panta baghar bal or panta bhat gives the strength of a tiger.

== Nutrition ==
In a study conducted by agricultural biotechnology department of the Assam Agricultural University it was concluded that cooked rice had an element that prevented the availability of minerals like iron, potassium, sodium and calcium in high quantities, and the breakdown of the nutritional inhibitor by the lactic acid bacteria increased the mineral content manifolds. According to Madhumita Barooah, one of the researchers, "About 100 gm of cooked rice has only 3.4 mg of iron, while for the same quantity of rice fermented for 12 hours, the iron content went up to 73.91 mg. Likewise, sodium, which was 475 mg came down to 303 mg, potassium went up to 839 mg and calcium went up from 21 mg per 100 gm of cooked rice to 850 mg, after 12 hours of fermentation of the same quantity of rice." According to another study (ILSI 1998), fermentation improves the bioavailability of minerals such as iron and zinc as a result of phytic acid hydrolysis, and increases the content of riboflavin and vitamin B.

Panta bhat has some remedial use. It is considered as a "cold food" by Ayurveda traditions, while boiled rice is neutral. Hence is a preferred food for children with a fever. Panta bhat also contains a small amount of alcohol as a result of fermentation. When the conditions of preparing panta bhat — keeping rice soaked overnight in water — were simulated in the laboratory, the rice was found to be inoculated with veratridine, a steroid-derived alkaloid.

Despite its nutritional and remedial values, panta bhat is often contaminated, with almost 90% of the samples containing fecal coliforms with a median count of 3.9 log cfu/ml. The contamination was more in the rainy season. Numbers of fecal coliforms increased 10-fold when there was a delay of more than 4 hours between preparation and consumption; 90% of the samples were eaten more than 12 hours after preparation. Contamination increased during the rainy season. A ten-fold increase in contamination was observed between 4 hours of soaking and 16 hours of soaking. In cases of diarrhoea this stale rice is not to be served to the patient, though boiled rice and rice-water are often prescribed as diarrheal treatment.

== See also ==
- List of rice dishes
- Assamese cuisine
- Bengali cuisine
