= Ranna Puja =

Traditional Hindu festival

Ranna Puja (Bengali: রান্না পূজা) is a traditional Hindu festival. It is mainly celebrated in different regions of West Bengal. The ritual of cooking foods the night before the puja and eating this stale food the next day is Arandhan (Cooking is forbidden on that day).

At present-day, the normal mood and customs of Arandhan festival have relaxed a lot due to the busyness of modern times. However, this festival is still widely celebrated in rural areas as well as Kolkata's suburbs areas.

== Festival ==
Ranna Puja is celebrated twice a year in West Bengal. Once on Sankranti in month of Bhadro alongside Mansa Puja typically on the day of Vishwakarma Puja and the other one on Shitalashashti the day after Sripanchami or Saraswati Puja in month of Magh.

=== Types of practice ===
An integral part of Manasa Puja is the Arandhan or Ranna Puja. Depending on the place in West Bengal, the Manasa and Ashtanag Puja begins on any Saturday or Tuesday and on every fifth day from Naga Panchami during the Bhadro month of Bengali calendar, and on Bhadro Sankranti, Manasa and Ashtanag Puja are completed and Bisarjan is performed. On that occasion Ranna Puja is celebrated on Sankranti as a ritual. This Ranna Puja is also known as Bhadre Rendhe Ashvine Khaoa Utsab. Ranna Puja celebrated on the day of Manasa Puja in Sankranti of Bhadro is called by many as Unun Puja Utsab. When it is celebrated on the day of Vishwakarma Puja, it is called "Buroranna".

A Ranna Puja is held on the day after Saraswati Puja in the month of Magha. That day is Shital Shashti. Shilnora Puja is performed on that day, so no fresh food is cooked.

== Arrangements and materials ==
Pakshala or Ranna ghar's Unnan (oven) is the symbol of Mother Manasa. Hindu housewives keep Manasa pots with branches of shaluk (Nymphaeaceae) and fanimana trees in a place in the kitchen for the welfare of the family and to get rid of the fear of snakes. On the eve of the puja, a portion of the various dishes is offered to the deity, that were cooked the day before. But the main ritual of this festival is to offer the best vegetables and fish of the season to the deity. Panta bhat is notable among stale foods. Those who are vegetarians have vegetarian cooking in their homes. But non-vegetarian cooking is prevalent in most households. Ilish and shrimp are one of the seasonal fish among non-vegetarians. Devoutes women of Bengal read or listen to the vows of the goddess at the end of the puja.
