= Pakhala =

Dish in Odia cuisine of India

Pakhala ପଖାଳ
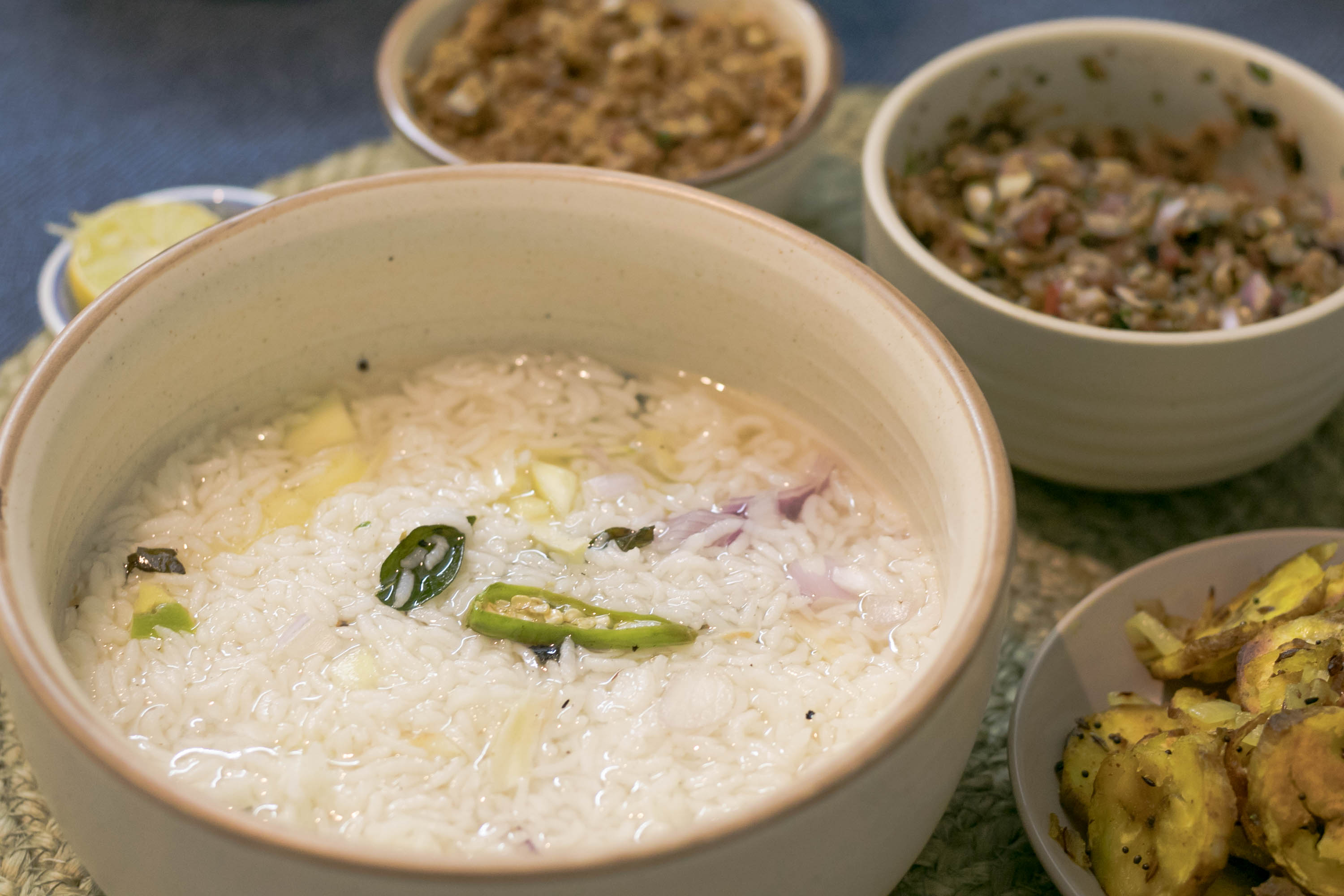
- Course: Saja Pakhaḷa (Freshly cooked rice), Basi Pakhala (Fermented rice), Jira Pakhala (Cumin rice), Dahi Pakhala (curd rice)
- Place of origin: Indian subcontinent
- Region or state: Odisha
- Associated cuisine: Odia cuisine
- Serving temperature: Hot (Saja Pakhala) and cold
- Main ingredients: Cooked rice
- Variations: Panta bhat
- Food energy (per serving): 52 per 100g

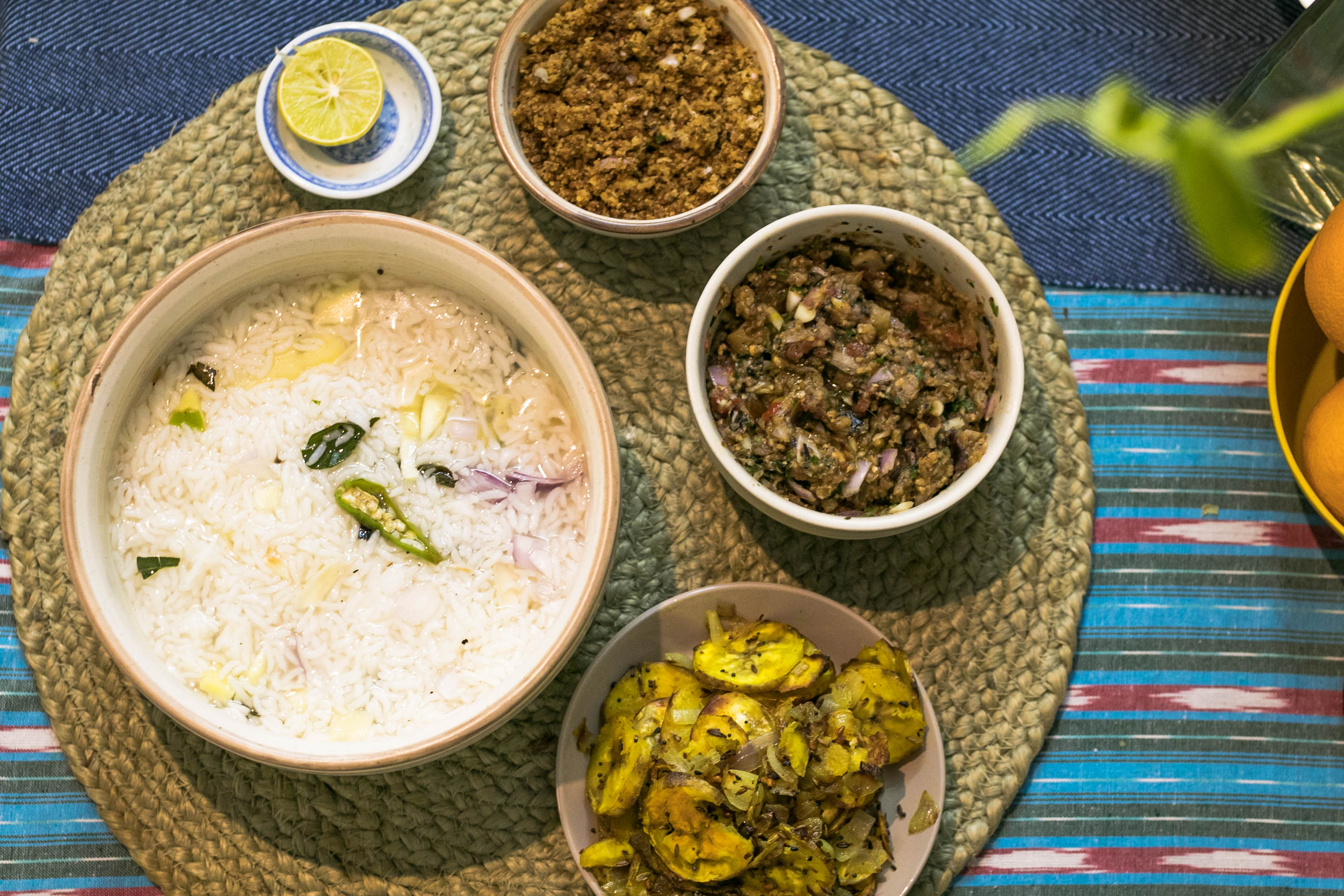
Pakhala with lemon and assorted side-dishes.

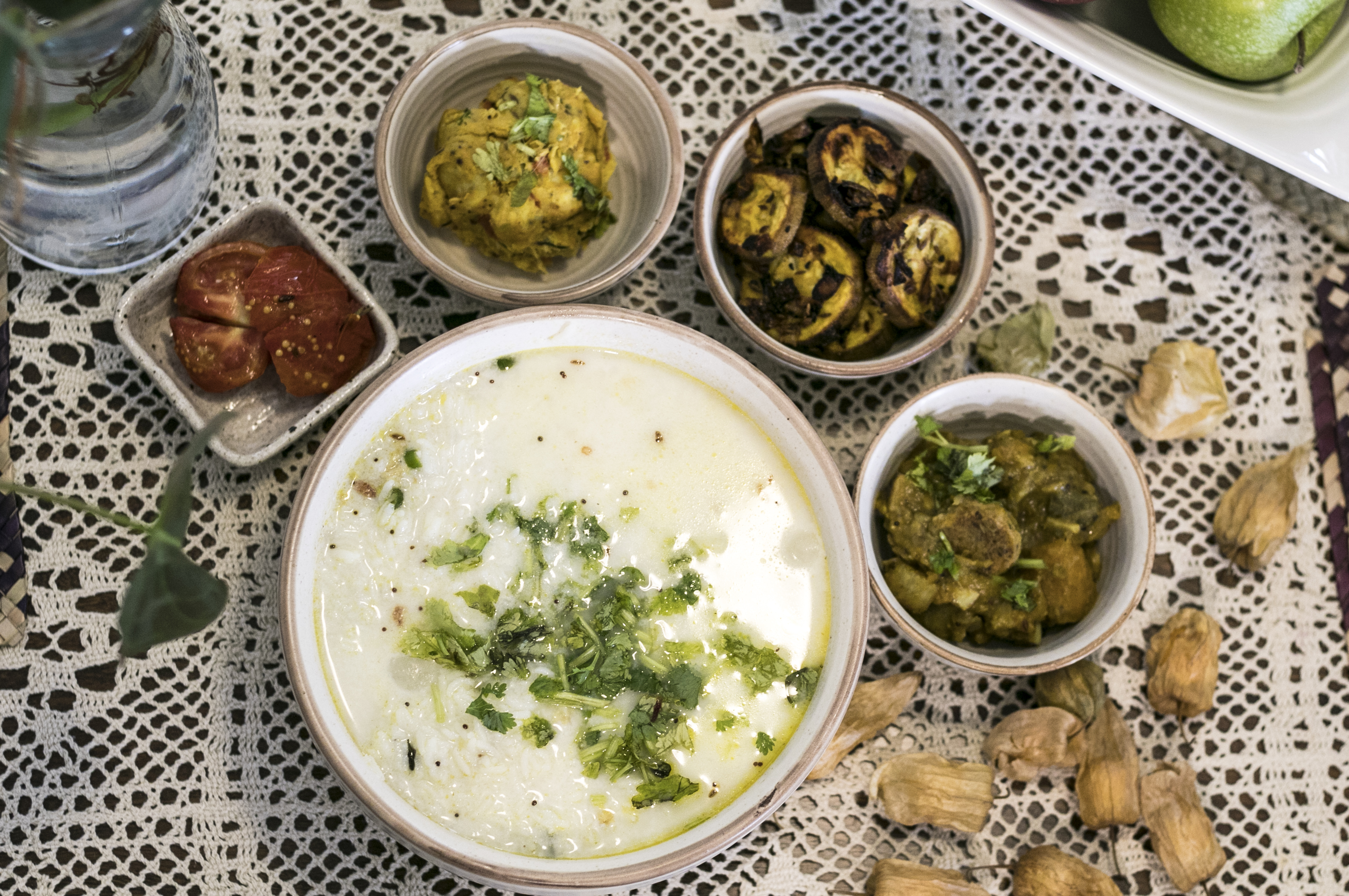
This is typical summer-time Odia cuisine. Dahi Pakala also known as pakhala along with assorted side dishes. This lunch is often preferred to beat the summer heat in Eastern India.

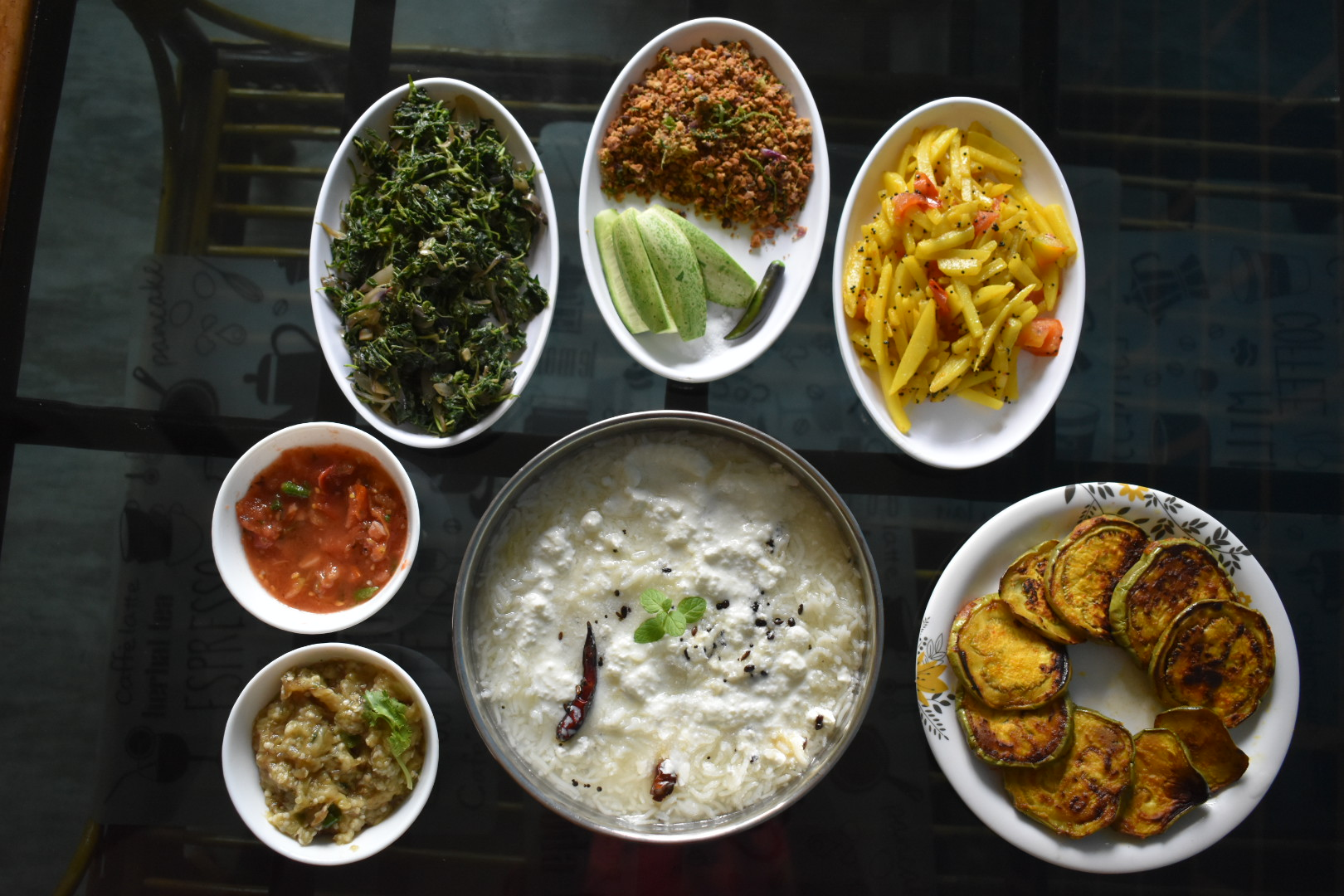
Dahi pakhala (yogurt pakhala) with assorted side-dishes.

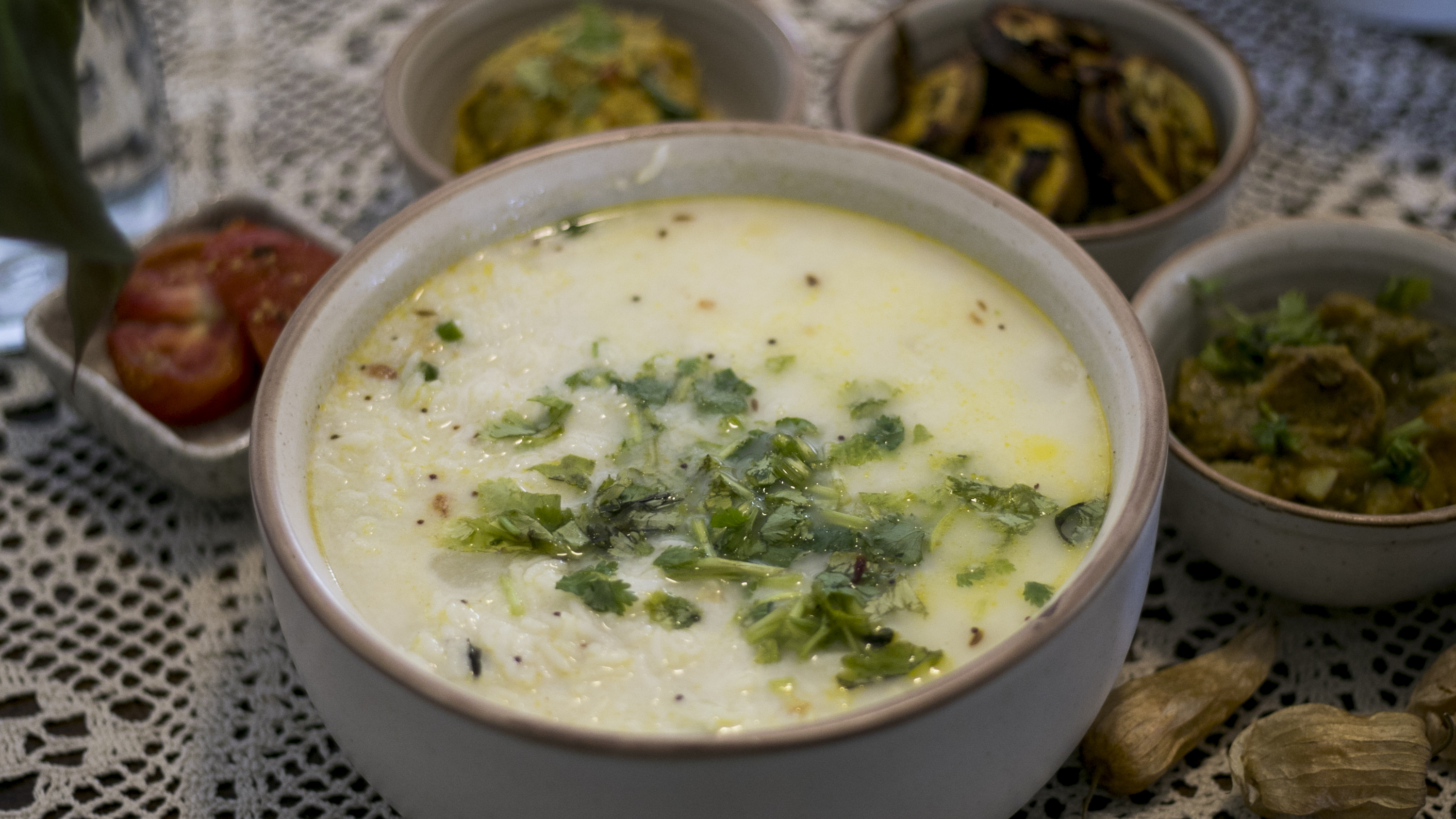
Pakhaḷa with yogurt, lemon, fresh cilantro, sautéed mustard and cumin seeds.

Pakhaḷa (Odia: ପଖାଳ, romanized: påkhāḷå, Odia pronunciation: [pɔkʰaɭɔ]) is a dish in Odia cuisine, consisting of cooked rice washed or lightly fermented in water. The liquid part of the dish is known as Toraṇi (Odia: ତୋରାଣି, romanized: tōrāṇi). It is popular in the state of Odisha and its similar version is eaten in the eastern regions like Chhattisgarh, Jharkhand, Assam, Bengal and southern regions of Kerala, Tamil Nadu, Andhra Pradesh, Karnataka.

It is generally eaten in the summer, especially for lunch when it is viewed as refreshing and nutritious. Pakhaḷa is prepared with rice, curd, cucumber, cumin seeds, fried onions and mint leaves. It is often served with dry roasted vegetables—such as potato, brinjal, badi and sāgå bhåjā or fried fish.

== Etymology ==
The term "Påkhāḷå" is derived from Pali word "Pakhāḷitā" (Odia: ପଖାଳିତା, romanized: påkhāḷitā) as well as from (Sanskrit: प्रक्षाळन, romanized: prakshāḷaṇa, lit. 'washed/to wash'). It is also believed that "Påkhāḷå" could have been possibly derived from "Påkhāḷibā" (Odia: ପଖାଳିବା, romanized: påkhāḷibā, lit. 'to wash').

== History ==
It is unknown when Pakhaḷa was first included in the daily diet of Eastern India, but it was included in the recipe of Lord Jagannath Temple of Puri circa 10th century. It is presumed that Pakhaḷa is first introduced in Odisha. A special day, 20th March, is celebrated in Odisha as Pakhaḷ Dibasa (Odia: ପଖାଳ ଦିବସ) every year. All Odia people celebrate this day. The Pakhaḷa is eaten in the eastern part of the Indian subcontinent (including Nepal and some parts of Myanmar). The word Pakhaḷa was used in the Odia poems of Arjuna Das in his literary work Kåḷpålåtā (Odia: କଳ୍ପଲତା) during 1520-1530 CE.

== Classification ==
The different types of Pakhala classified as per preparation:

=== Main variants ===
- Saja Pakhaḷa (fresh pakhaḷa) is prepared by adding water instantly after making freshly cooked rice with drops of lemon in it. This variant doesn't need fermentation.
- Basi Pakhaḷa (Fermented pakhala, basi in Odia means "stale") is prepared by fermenting rice by adding water which is generally kept overnight and eaten in the next day. This variant of pakhala follows the traditional method of preparation. People also eat it with badi chura along with diced onions and lemon to add flavors to the dish.
- Jira Pakhaḷa is prepared by adding fried cumin with curry leaves to the pakhaḷa.
- Dahi Pakhaḷa is prepared by adding curd to the pakhaḷa. Badi chura is taken as a side dish with pakhala.
- The dish is especially popular during the summer months as it is considered to be a refreshing and cooling meal that can help beat the heat.
- It is also believed to have various health benefits as it is rich in probiotic which can aid digestion and boost the immune system. more

=== Others ===
- Chaiyn (ଚାଇଁ) pakhala (hot pakhala) is similar to saja pakhala (fresh pakhala) but is served with hot rice.
- Pani Pakhala is a common variant prepared by only adding salt and water to the cooked rice.
- Ada Pakhala is prepared by adding ginger and salt to the cooked rice soaked in water.
- Sugandhi Pakhala or Subasa Pakhala (flavored pakhala) is prepared by adding chopped or grated ginger and roasted cumin seeds to cooked rice submerged in salty water which gives an aroma to the pakhala.
- Chupuda Pakhala (squeezed pakhala) is prepared by squeezing out the cooked rice washed in water and served with curd, roasted cumin and salt.
- Mitha Pakhala (sweet pakhala) is prepared by adding sugar or jaggery to cooked rice and water along with roasted cumin. It is an unusual variant and not popular compared to popular fresh or stale pakhala. Sometimes oranges are added as well.
- Tabha Pakhala is prepared by adding lemon water to the cooked rice.
- Ghia Pakhala is prepared by adding ghee to the cooked rice.
- Malliphula Pakhala is prepared by malli flowers (jasmine) to the cooked rice for aroma.

== Preparation ==
The dish is typically prepared with rice that is cooked and allowed to cool. Rice is cooked and then cooled, before being added to water in a bowl. In a pan, heat a pinch of oil, add mustard seeds, curry leaves, dry red chili and fry well. Add this chhunka into the pakhala bowl with sour curd. One can add mint leaves and raw salt to enhance the taste. To add more zing, one may opt for fish fry or sukhua poda (dry fish fried), saga bhaja, badi chura (a regional food item made up of batter of urad or black gram by drying under sunshine as small nuts and then fried to serve) and much more. Cumin seeds are fried, ground into a fine powder and added to curd with coriander leaves and salt.It is sometimes served with a fish fry and spinach.

=== Traditional preparation ===
Pakhaḷa is slightly fermented rice. The rice is cooked, water is added with little bit of old pakhal (something similar to making curd using milk and old curd). Pakhaḷa tastes best when served after 8 to 12 hours after preparation; in this case, no old pakhal is required to be added to the rice as fermentation usually happens after 6 hours of keeping rice in water. The Pakhala by itself tastes a bit sour, but also paste of green chilli, green Mango and ginger is added to give the Pakhala a little bit hot and sweet flavour.

Generally burnt potato or alu poda (boiled is also used) and other fried vegetables or fried fish is served with pakhaḷa. Various side dishes include dahi baigana, kakharu phula bhaja (fried pumpkin flowers), mashed potatoes (alu bharata), fried fish (macha bhaja), fried prawns (chingudi bhaja), sukhua (dried fish) and saga bhaja (fired leafy vegetables).

== Pakhala Dibasa ==
To promote the cuisine in modern era, Pakhala Dibasa was declared on 20 March 2011 by popular initiative to be celebrated by Odias worldwide. Thus 20 March is celebrated every year as Pakhala Dibas (Pakhala Day) by Odias across the regions where people eat and promote the cuisine.

As most of the Odia outside of Odisha live in Europe and in the Northern American regions, the weather in March is not suitable for cold-Pakhal. Therefore, the International-Pakhal-Dibasa is celebrated on July 13.

== Other regional variants ==
- Chhattisgarh: Bore Bhat
- Jharkhand: Pani Bhat
- Gujarat: Ghesh Bhat, Ghensh, Ghenshu
- Tamil Nadu: Pazhaiyadhu or Pazhaiya Soru
- Andhra Pradesh: Saddi Annam
- Karnataka: Majjige Anna / Majjige huli
- Bengal: Panta Bhat
- Assam: Poita Bhat
- Kerala: Pazham Kanji

== See also ==
- List of Indian dishes
- Cuisine of Odisha
