= Ōgi Station =

Ōgi Station is the name of multiple train stations in Japan:

- Ōgi Station (Hyōgo) (青木駅)
- Ogi Station, a railway station on the Karatsu Line in Ogi, Saga Prefecture, Japan
- Ōgi Station (Saga), a railway station on the Matsuura Railway in Arita, Saga Prefecture, Japan

== See also ==
- Ogi Station
