= Chingudi jhola =

Indian prawn curry

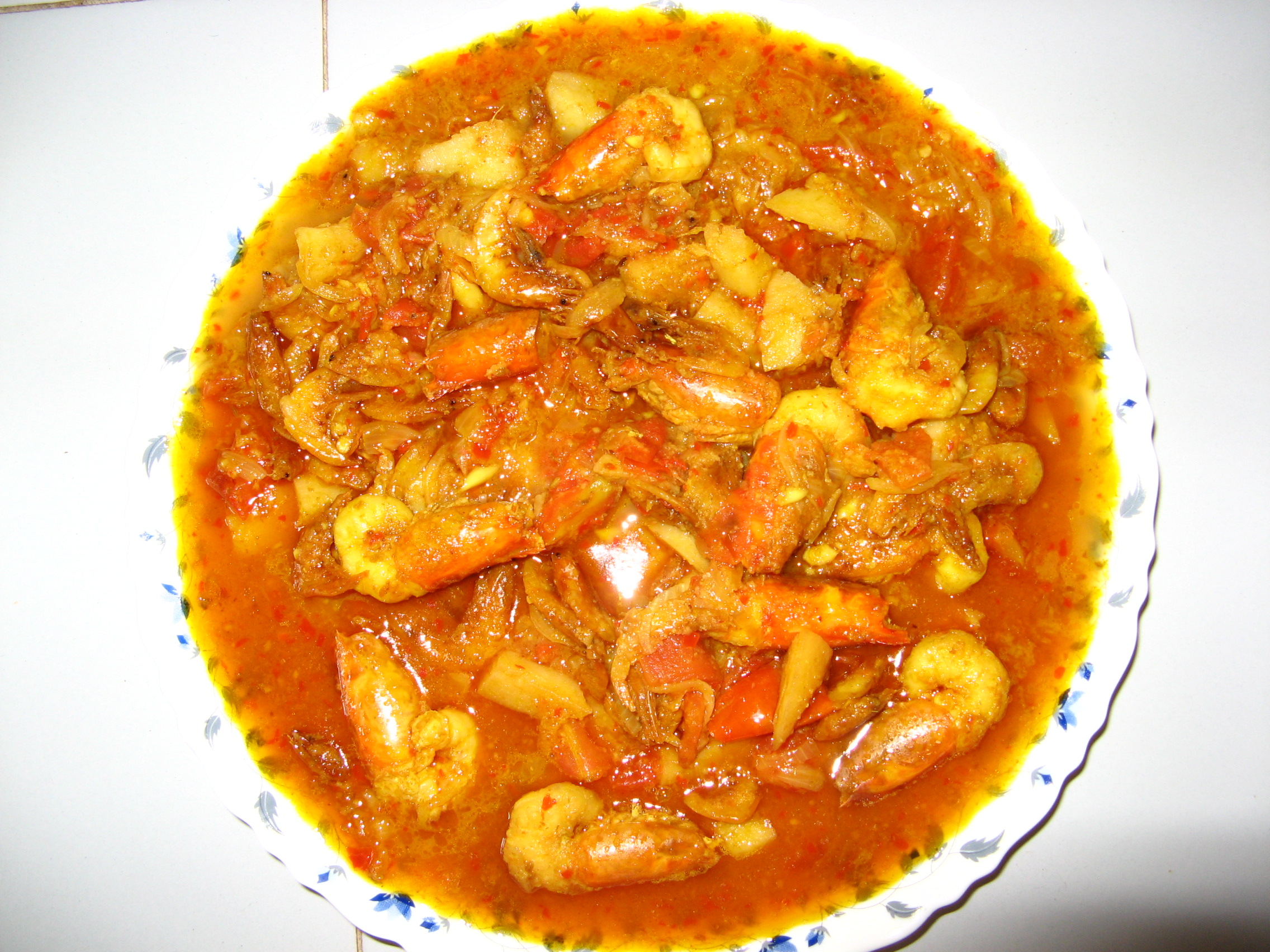
- Alternative names: Chungudi Jhola
- Type: Curry
- Place of origin: Odisha, India
- Region or state: India
- Main ingredients: Prawns, mustard oil, garam masala

Chingudi jhola (Odia: ଚିଙ୍ଗୁଡ଼ି ଝୋଳ) or chungudi jhola (Odia: ଚୁଙ୍ଗୁଡ଼ି ଝୋଳ) is a spicy gravy based prawn curry with different flavours of spices. It is mostly eaten by people of the coastal regions and the areas of River basins of Odisha, India.

== Preparation ==
The curry is prepared by frying the prawns in mustard oil, and then in a mixture of garam masala—including cinnamon. Bay leaves are also used when making the curry. Some variations of chungudi jhola include the use of coconut-cashew paste. The curry includes an abundance of tomato and garlic which gives the curry a reddish hue and spicy flavour.
