= Durgapur, Chandrapur =

Durgapur
- Town
- Location in Maharashtra, India
- Coordinates: 20.0°N 79.3°E
- Country: India
- State: Maharashtra
- District: Chandrapur
- Elevation: 204 m (669 ft)

Population (2001)
  - Total: 17,369

Languages
  - Official: Marathi
- Time zone: UTC+5:30 (IST)

Durgapur is a census town in Chandrapur district in the state of Maharashtra, India.

== Geography ==
Durgapur is located at 20.0°N 79.3°E. It has an average elevation of 204 metres (669 feet).

== Demographics ==
As of 2001 India census, Durgapur had a population of 17,369. Males constitute 50% of the population and females 50%. Durgapur has an average literacy rate of 74%, higher than the national average of 59.5%: male literacy is 81% and, female literacy is 66%. In Durgapur, 14% of the population is under 6 years of age.

Year	Male	Female	Total Population	Change	Religion (%)							
Year	Male	Female	Total Population	Change	Hindu	Muslim	Christian	Sikhs	Buddhist	Jain	Other religions and persuasions	Religion not stated
2001	9127	8587	17714	-	56.340	7.452	4.465	0.497	30.767	0.186	0.231	0.062
2011	9069	8624	17693	-0.001	52.789	9.314	4.572	0.384	32.075	0.232	0.141	0.492
