= Shorshe ilish =

Bengali fish dish

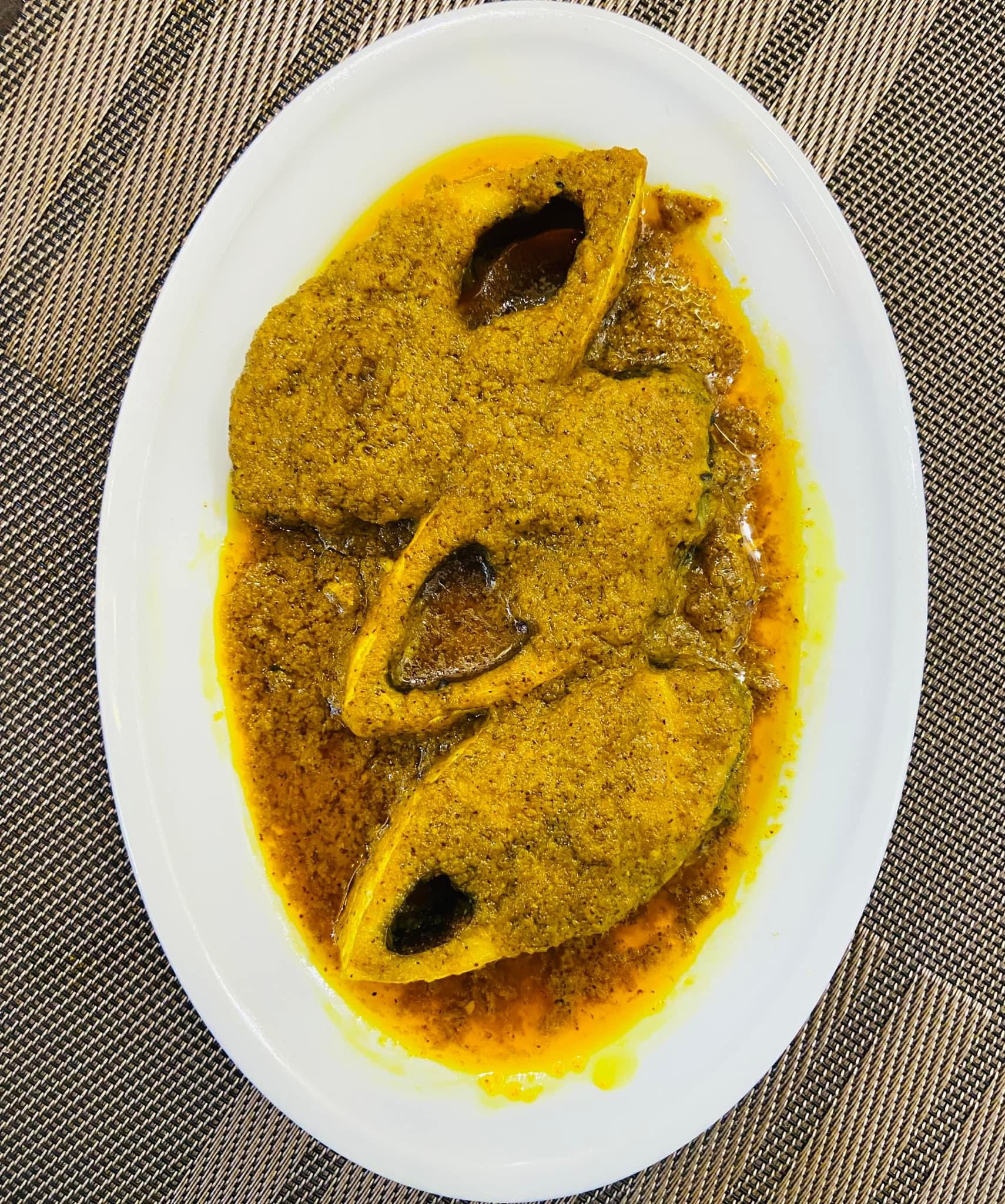
- Shorshe ilish
- Course: Main course
- Place of origin: Bengal
- Region or state: Bengal
- Associated cuisine: Bangladesh, India
- Serving temperature: Hot
- Main ingredients: Hilsa, mustard paste, turmeric, common salt
- Variations: Shorshe ilish bhapa

Shorshe ilish (Bengali pronunciation: [sorʃe iliʃ]) is a Bengali dish, native to the Bengal region of South Asia, made from hilsa or Tenualosa ilisha, a type of herring, cooked in mustard gravy. The dish is popular among the people of Bangladesh. It is widely considered the national dish of Bangladesh. It is also popular in the Indian states of West Bengal, Tripura and Assam's Barak Valley.

== Ingredients ==
The main ingredients are hilsa, white mustard, mustard, mustard oil, green chili, black cumin, turmeric powder, red chili powder and salt. Lime juice or coriander leaves may be added for flavor.

== Variation ==
Shorshe ilish is a variation of this dish.

== Nutrition ==
Each serving contains approximately 450 calories, 17.1g protein, 8.1g carbohydrate, 38.4g total fat (4.9g saturated), 73.5 mg cholesterol, and 8.2 mg sodium.

== See also ==
- Bangladeshi cuisine
- Indian cuisine
- List of fish dishes
