= Podo pitha =

Food dish from Odisha, India

Poda pitha
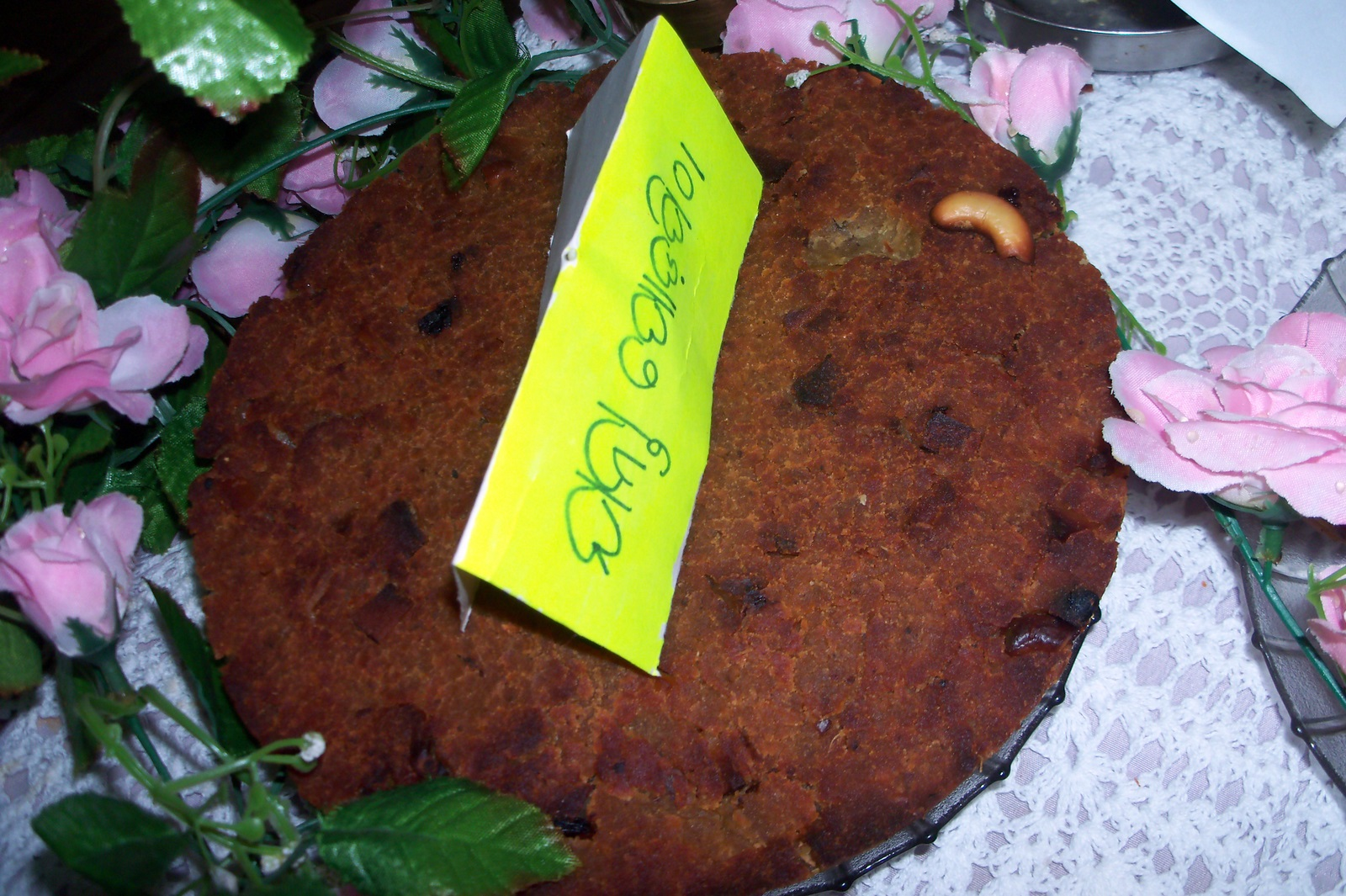
- Poda pitha prepared for Raja Parba.
- Alternative names: Poda pitha
- Place of origin: Odisha
- Region or state: Odisha
- Serving temperature: Both hot and cold
- Main ingredients: Rice, jaggery, black gram and coconut

Poṛa Piṭhā (Odia: ପୋଡ଼ ପିଠା) is slow-cooked pitha. It is made by slowly baking fermented rice, black gram, grated coconut and jaggery overnight. Its crust is slightly burnt, while the inside is soft and white. Poda pitha is generally made during Raja Parba. It is served to Lord Jagannath and his siblings at Mausi Maa Temple on their way back after Ratha-Yatra, from Gundicha Temple to Jagannath Temple, Puri.

== See also ==
- Odia cuisine
- Raja Parba
- Jagannath Temple, Puri
