= Raja (festival) =

Festival of Odisha

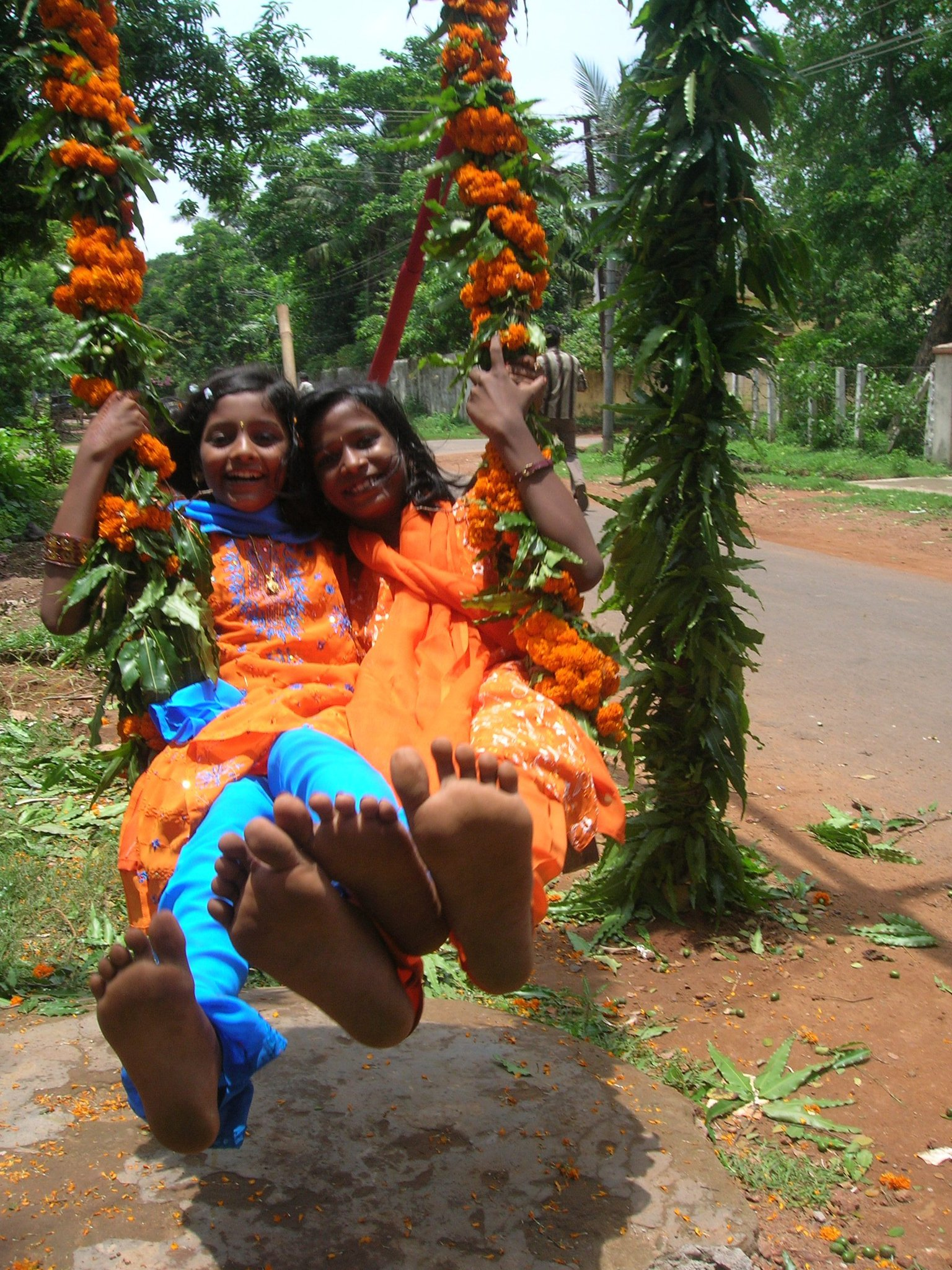
Girls swinging on Raja swing

Raja Parba (Odia: ରଜ ପର୍ବ, pronounced [ɾɔdʒɔ pɔɾbɔ]), also known as Mithuna Sankranti, is a three-day-long festival of womanhood celebrated in Odisha, India. The second day of the festival signifies the beginning of the solar month of Mithuna, from which the season of rains starts.

== Mythology ==
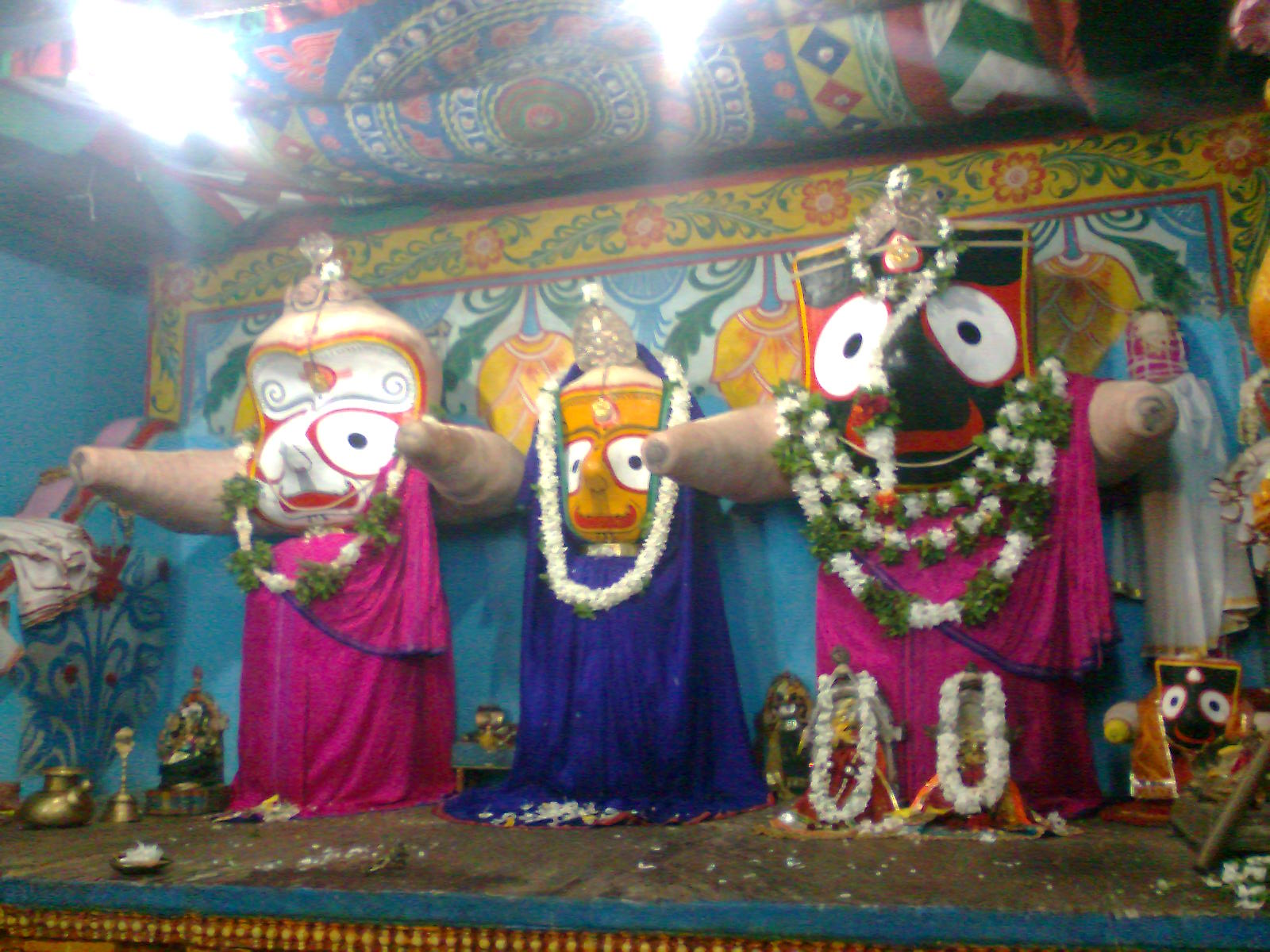
Murtis of Bhudevi and Sridevi (Bhumi and Lakshmi) at Nayagarh, below Jagannath (far right).

It is believed that the Hindu goddess Bhumi, the Mother Earth aspect of goddess Mahalakshmi and consort of Vishnu, experiences menstruation during the first three days of the festival. The fourth day is called Vasumati Snana, or the ceremonial bath of Bhumi. The term Raja comes from the Sanskrit word rajas, which means menstruation, and a menstruating woman is called rajasvala. In the medieval period, the festival became more popular as an agricultural holiday marking the worship of Bhumi, who is venerated as the consort of Jagannath, a regional form of Vishnu. A silver murti of Bhumi is present in the Puri Temple beside Jagannath.

== Rajaparba ==
The festival falls in mid- June. The first day is called Pahili Raja, the second day is Mithuna Sankranti, and the third day is Bhudaaha or Basi Raja. The fourth and final day is called Basumati snana, on which women bathe the grinding stone, a symbol of Bhumi, with turmeric paste and adorn it with flowers, sindoor and other items. All types of seasonal fruits are offered to Bhumi. The day before the first day is called Sajabaja, a preparatory day during which the house and kitchen, including the grinding stones, are cleaned and spices are ground for the following three days. During these three days, women and girls rest from work and wear new sarees, alata and ornaments. The festival is similar to Ambubachi Mela. One of the most popular festivals in Odisha, Raja is celebrated for three consecutive days. Just as the earth is believed to prepare itself for the coming rains, the festival is associated with preparing the unmarried girls of the family for marriage. They spend these three days in festivity and observe customs such as eating only uncooked and nourishing food, especially Podapitha, not bathing or eating salt, not walking barefoot, and vowing to give birth to healthy children in the future. Celebrations commonly feature rope swings hung from banyan trees and the singing of folk songs.

To celebrate the advent of the monsoon, villagers hold the festival over five days. Though celebrated throughout Odisha, it is observed with particular enthusiasm in the coastal districts. The first day is called "saja baja", the second "Pahili Raja", the third "Raja Sankranti", the fourth "Bhumi Dahana or Basi Raja", and the fifth Basumati snana

.

.

According to popular belief, just as women menstruate, which is a sign of fertility, so too does Mother Earth. All three days of the festival are therefore considered to be the menstruating period of Mother Earth, and as a mark of respect towards the Earth, all agricultural work is suspended during these days. The festival is particularly associated with unmarried girls, who are regarded as future mothers. They observe the restrictions prescribed for a menstruating woman. On the first day, they rise before dawn, do their hair, anoint their bodies with turmeric paste and oil and then take a purificatory bath in a river or tank. Bathing on the remaining two days is prohibited. They do not walk barefoot, scratch the earth, grind, tear anything apart, cut or cook. Throughout the three days, they wear their best clothes and decorations, eat cakes and rich food at the houses of friends and relatives, spend long hours on improvised swings and sing impromptu songs.

The swings are of different varieties, such as 'Ram Doli', 'Charki Doli', 'Pata Doli' and 'Dandi Doli'. Folk songs deal with love, affection, respect, social behaviour and other aspects of the social order. These songs are composed extempore and reflect the sentiments of the singers; many have endured and form part of the substratum of Odisha's folk poetry. On the eve of the onset of the monsoon in the month of Shravana, young men feast and pray for a good harvest, and take part in strenuous country games, the most popular being 'Kabaddi'. All-night 'Jatra' performances or 'Gotipua' dances are arranged in villages, and locals also arrange plays and other kinds of entertainment.

== See also ==
- Ambubachi Mela
- Jagannath
- Keddaso
- Odia language
- Odia literature
- Salepur
- Sisua village
- Teej
