= Jarapada =

- Town
- Locotion In Odisha, India Jarapada (India)
- Coordinates: 20.87°N 84.83°E
- country: India
- State: Odisha
- District: Angul
- Elevation: 17 m (56 ft)

Population (2015)
  - Total: 5,321

Languages
  - Official: Odia
- Time zone: UTC+5:30 (IST)
- Postal code: 759127
- Vehicle registration: OD-19
- Nearest town(s): Angul, Athamalik, Chhendipada
- Literacy: 54.5%
- Website: angul.nic.in

Jarapada is a rural town in Angul district, Odisha state in India. It is situated on the National Highway 55, 22.1 kilometres (13.7 mi) from the district headquarters Angul.
