= Deulajhari =

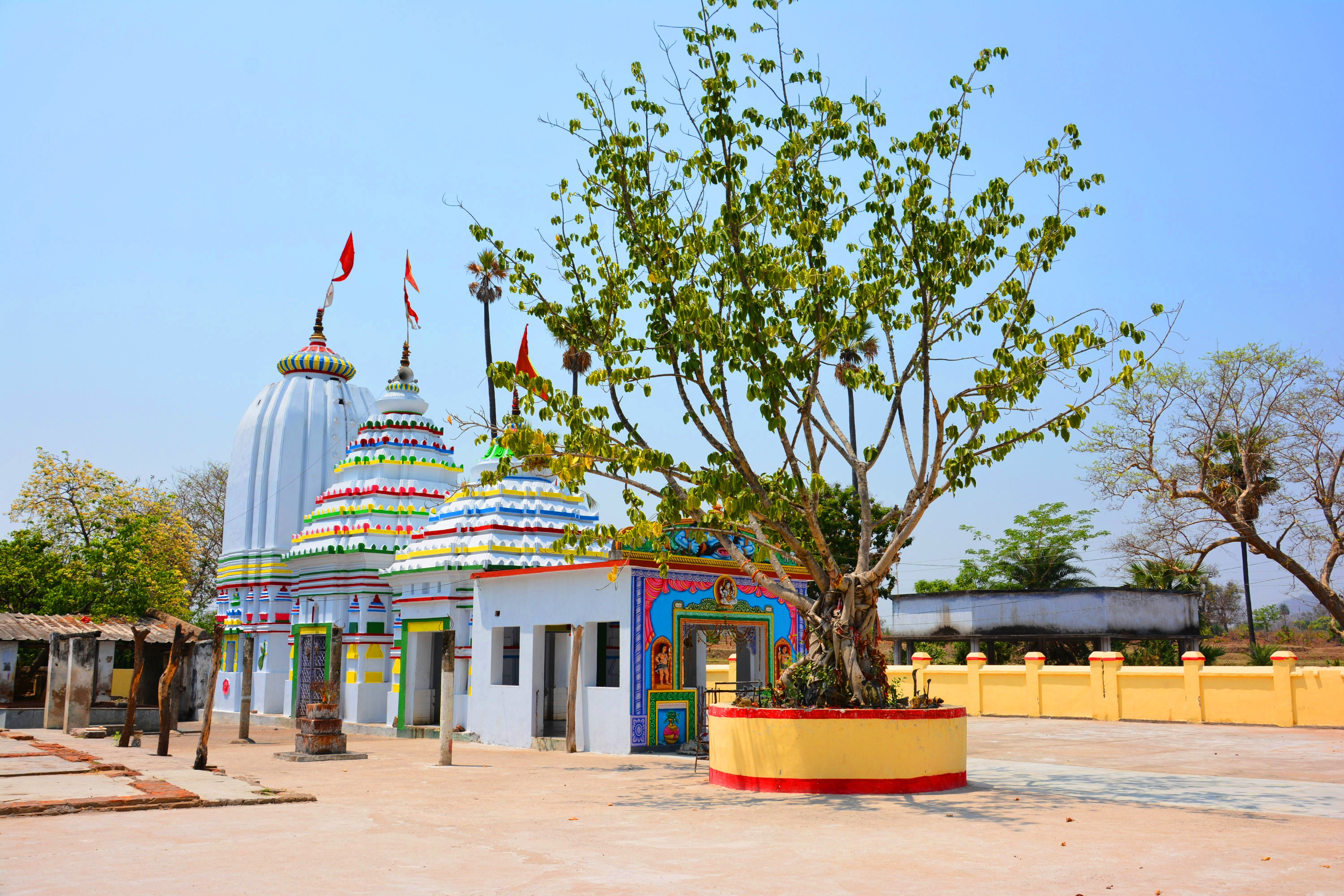

- Location within Odisha Location within India
- Interactive map of Deulajhari
- Location: Athmallik, Angul district, Odisha, India
- Coordinates: 20°44′41″N 84°29′52″E
- Elevation: 550 metres (1,800 ft)
- Temperature: 40 °C (104 °F)-60 °C (140 °F)

Deulajhari, the ancient citadel of Shaivism, is located in Deulajhari village in the Athmallik sub-divison of Angul district of the Indian state of Odisha. This attractive place is having 24 acres (9.7 ha) and 55 decimals of land and covered with indigenous- pandanus forest (kiabana). It is known for a hot spring and the Shiva Shree Siddeswar Baba temple. There are 24 hot springs around the temple although temple records say that once there were 84 such hot water springs here.

== Gallery ==
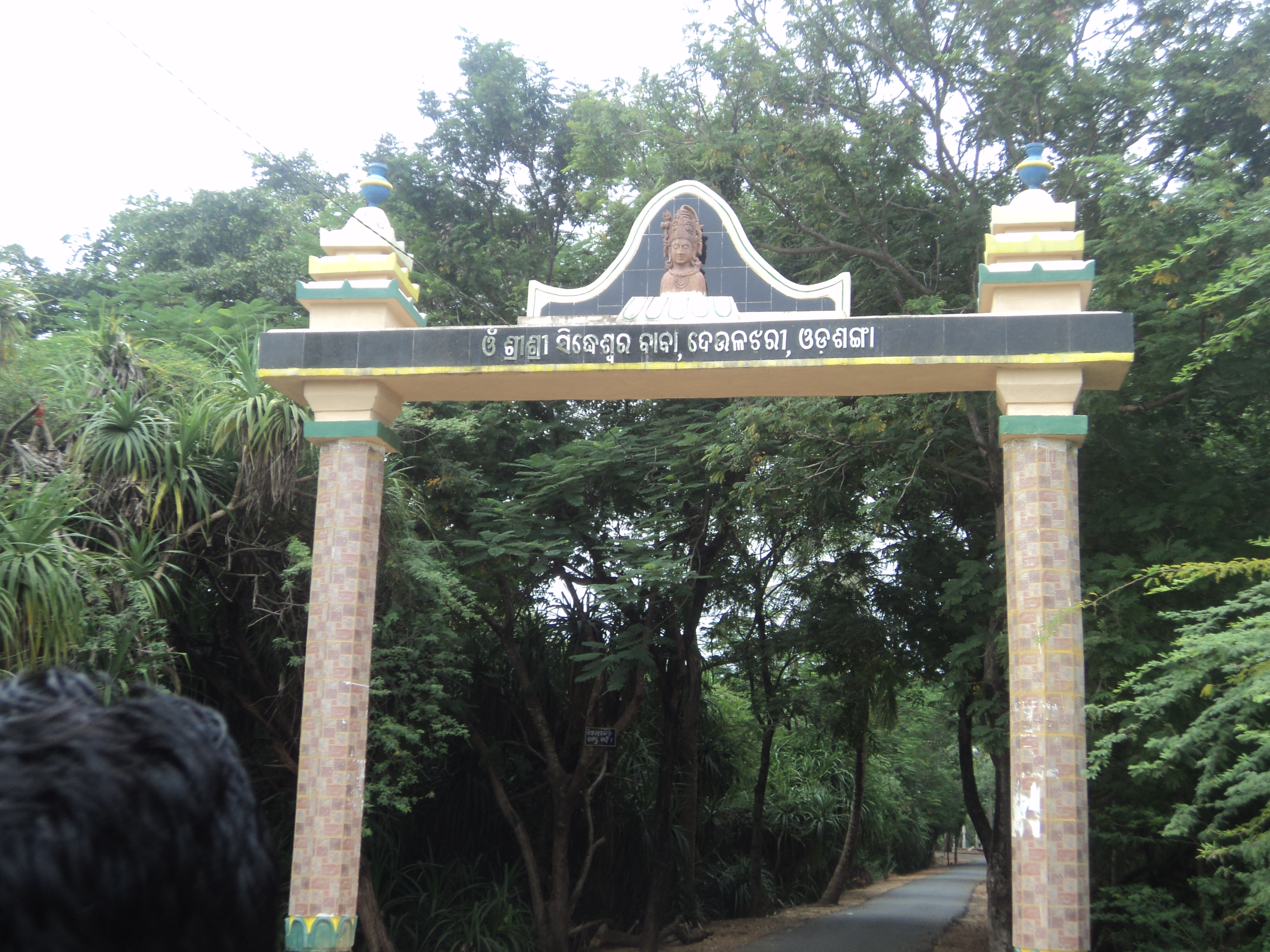
Main Gate

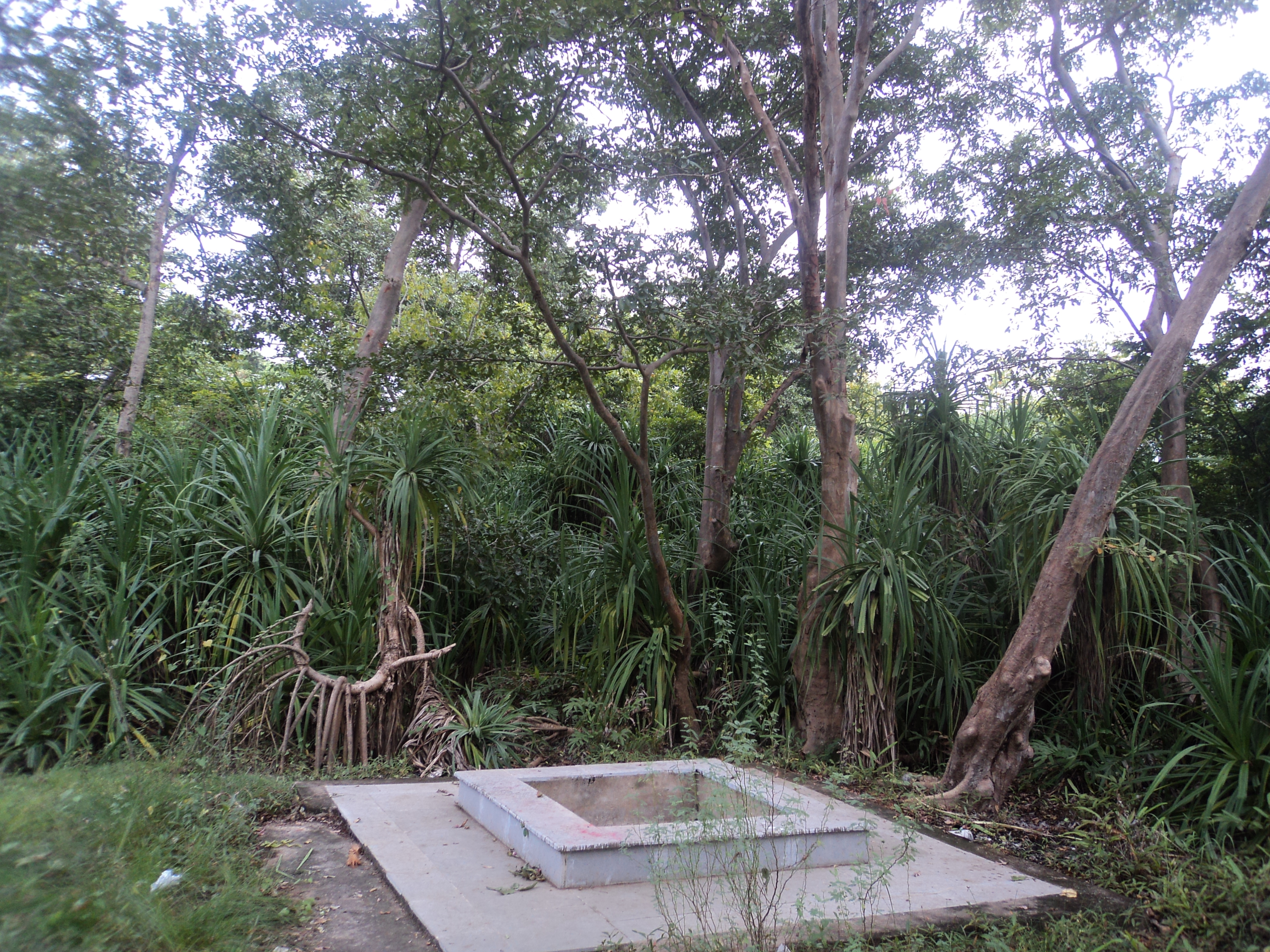
Deulajhari Hot Spring

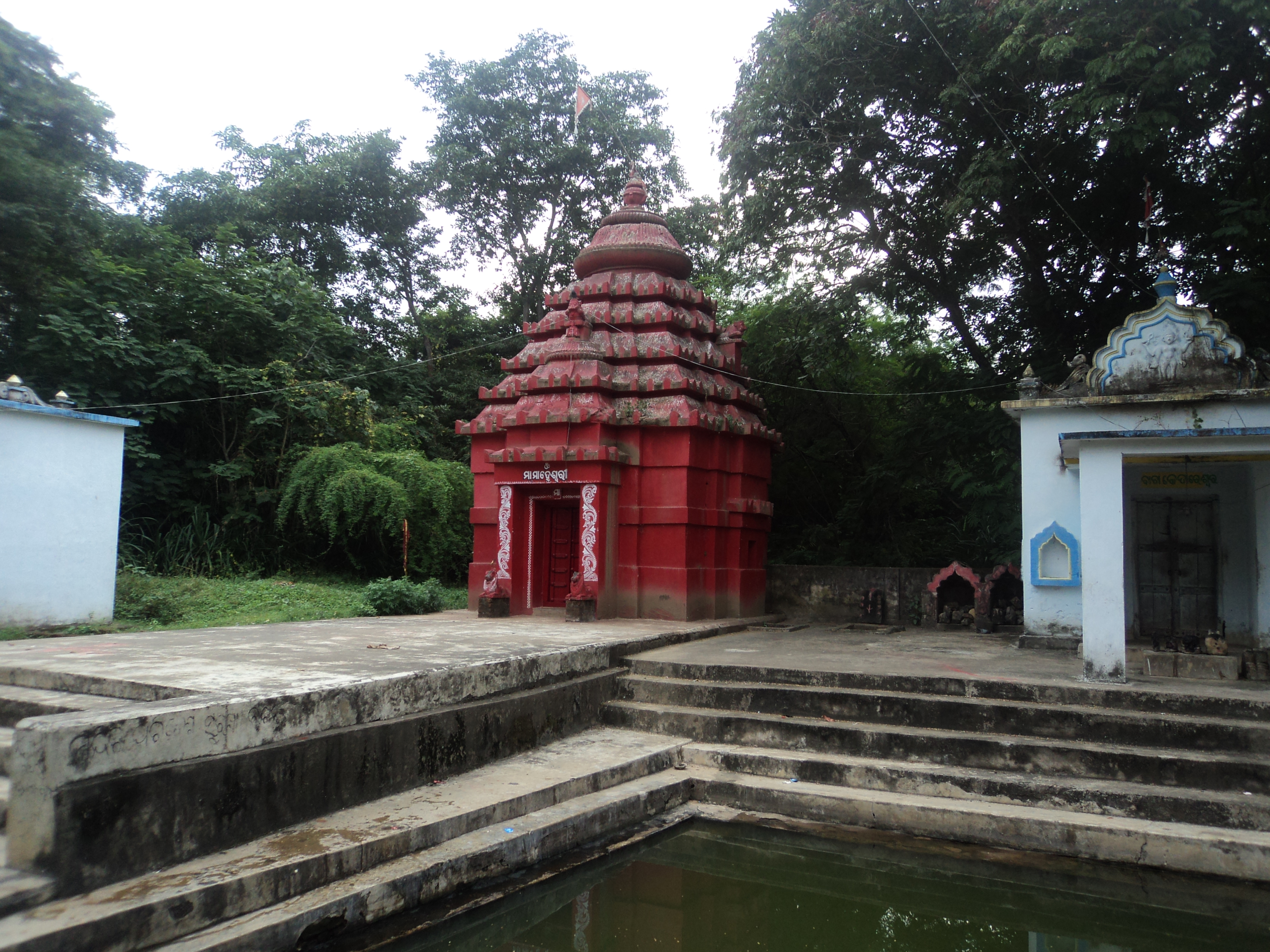
Maa Maheshwari Temple

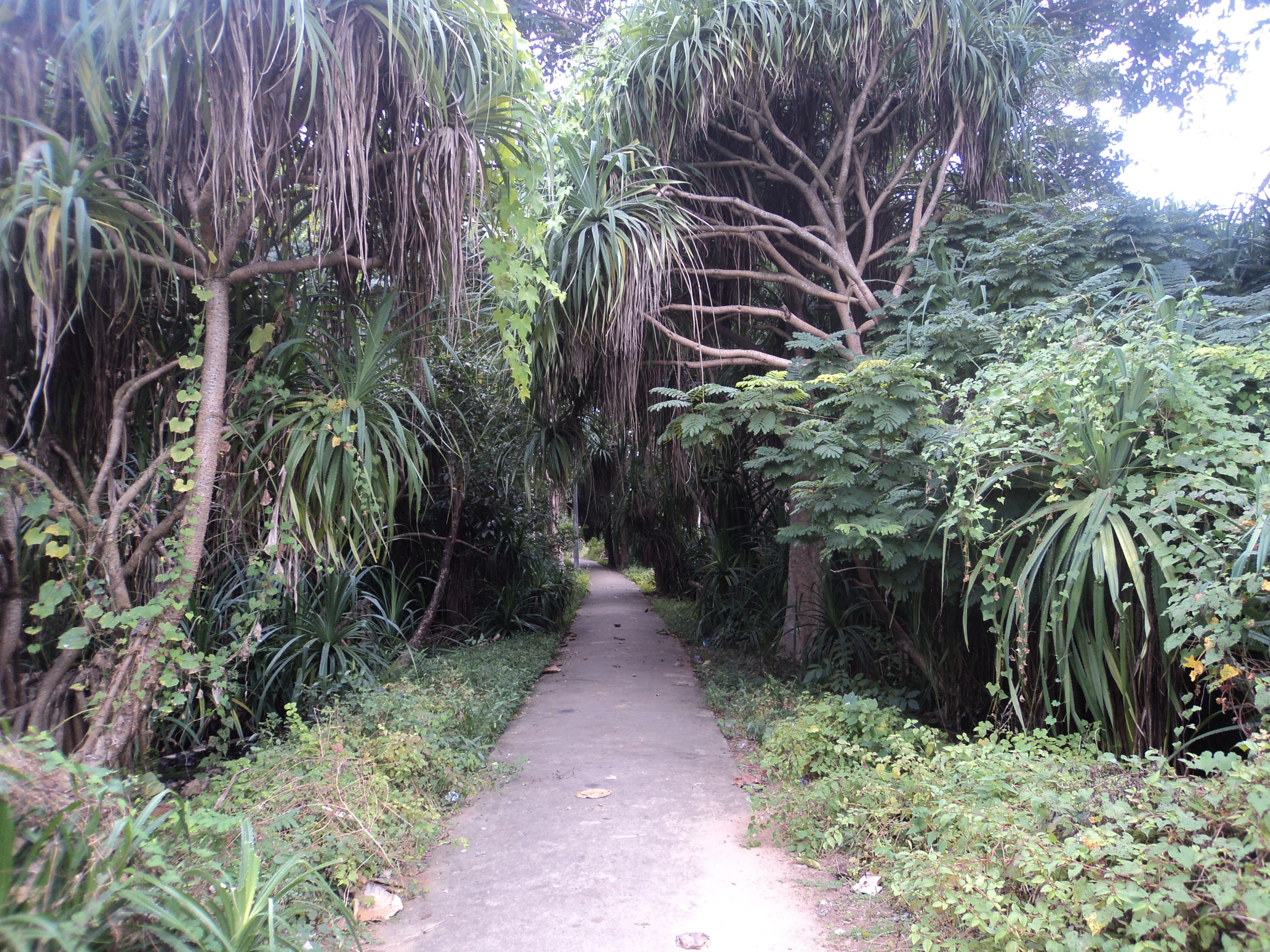
Way to jasmine forest

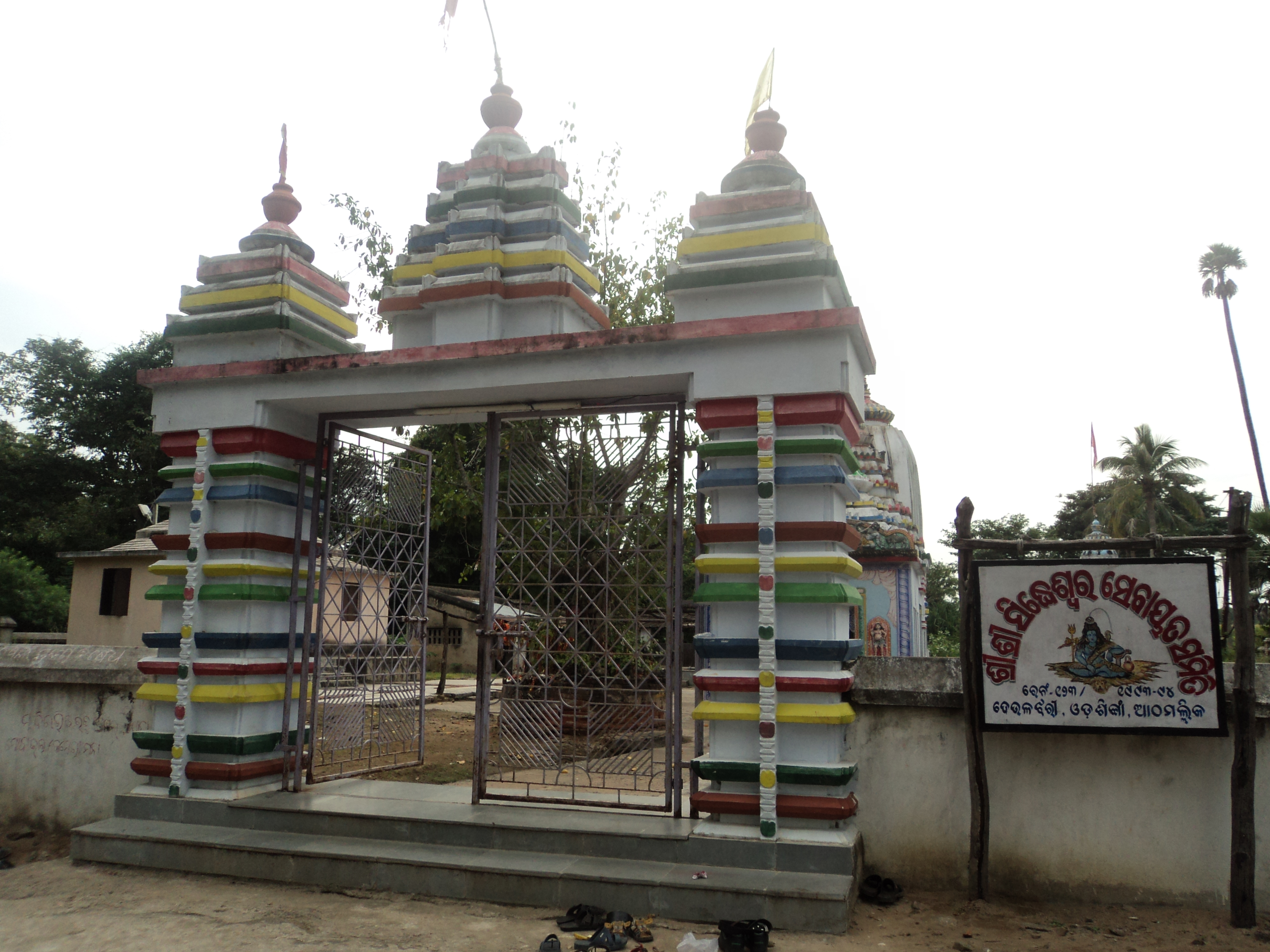
Deuljhari, Siddheshar Temple Main Gate

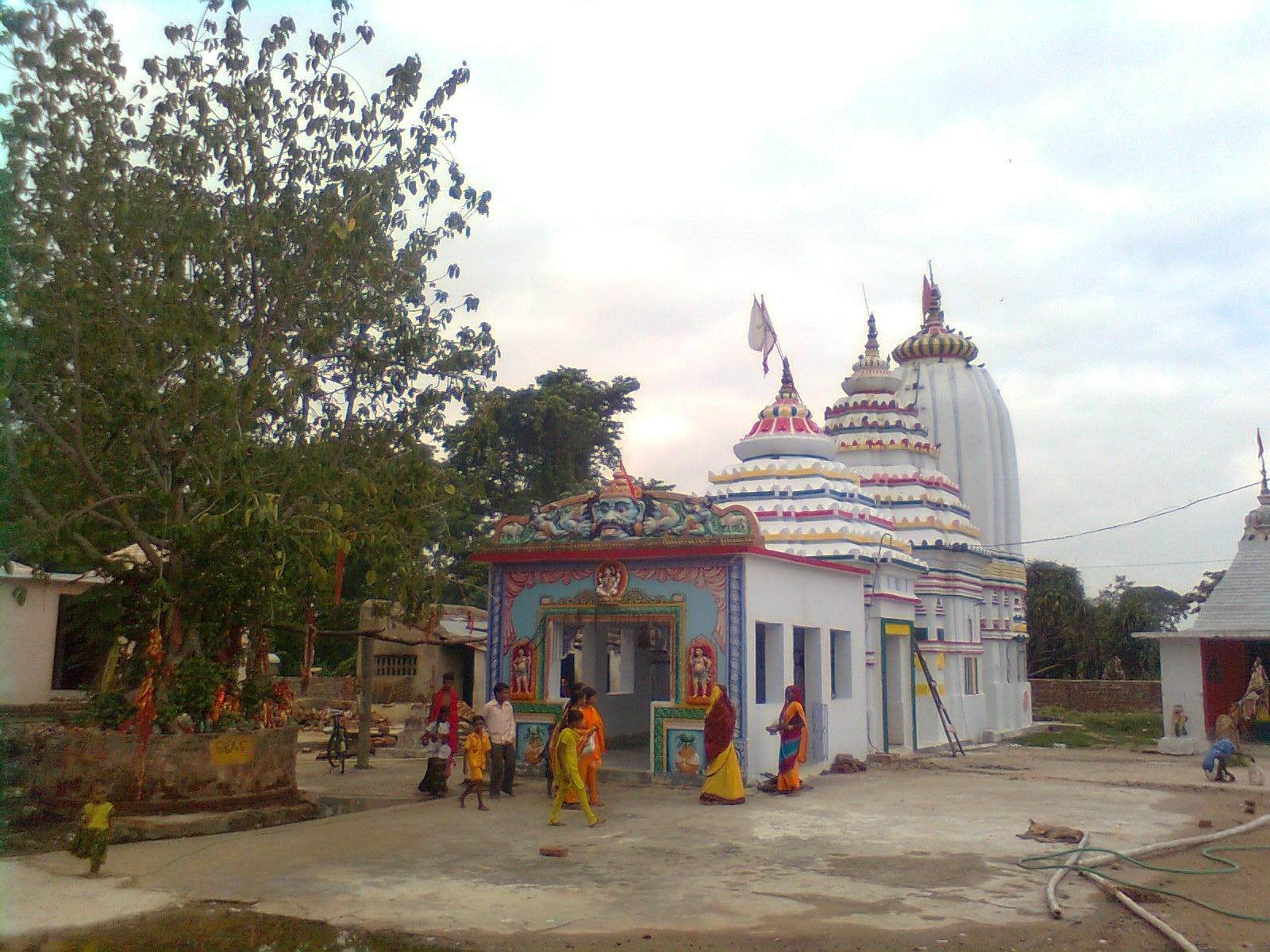
Shree Siddheswar Baba Temple of Deulajhari

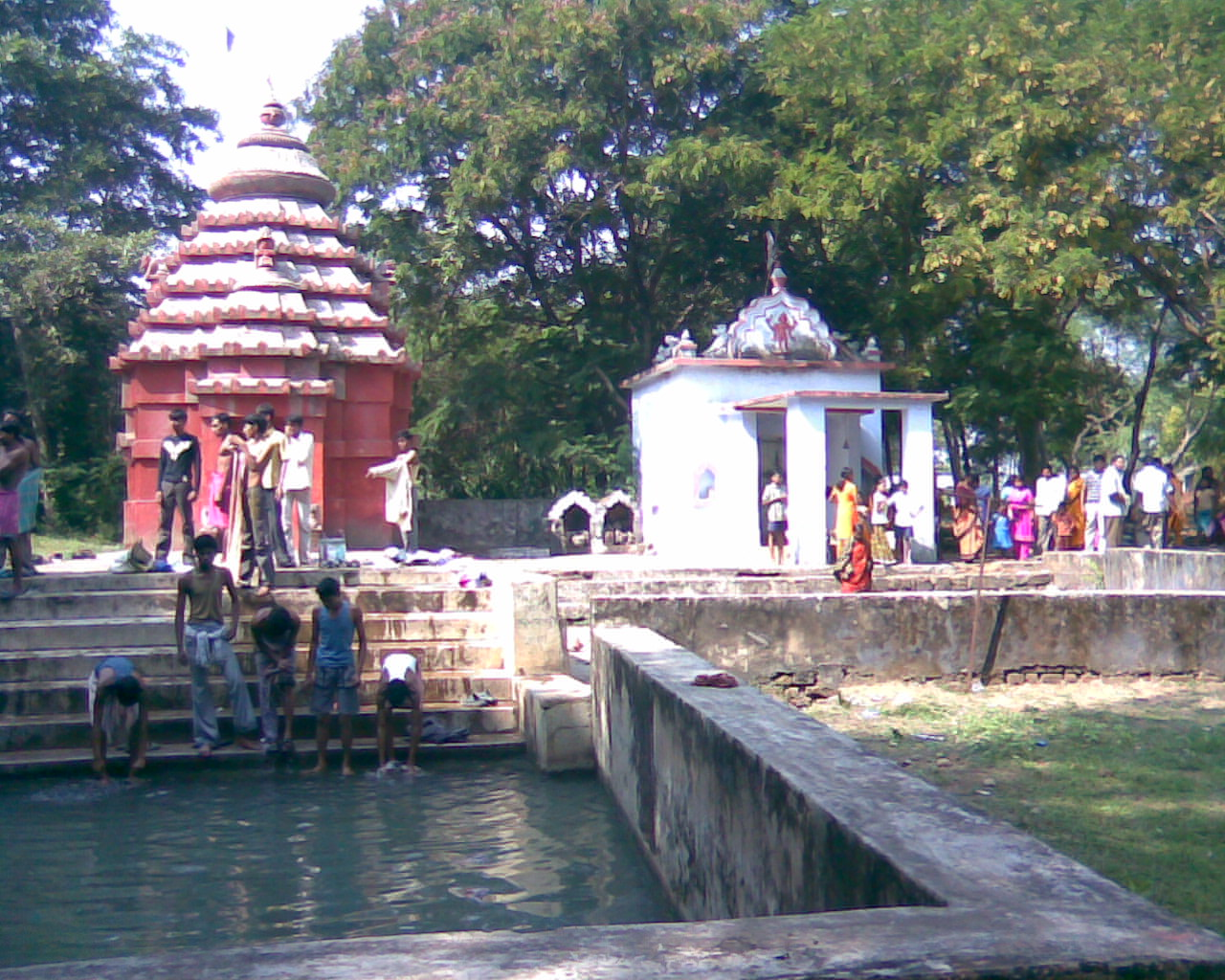
Deulajhari Hot Spring
