= Durgapur, Angul =

Durgapur
- Village
- Location in Odisha, India Durgapur (India)
- Coordinates: 20.9333°N 84.8833°E
- Country: India
- State: Odisha
- District: Angul
- Elevation: 247 m (810 ft)

Languages
  - Official: Odia
- Time zone: UTC+5:30 (IST)
- Website: odisha.gov.in

Durgapur is a village located in Angul district, in the Indian state of Odisha.

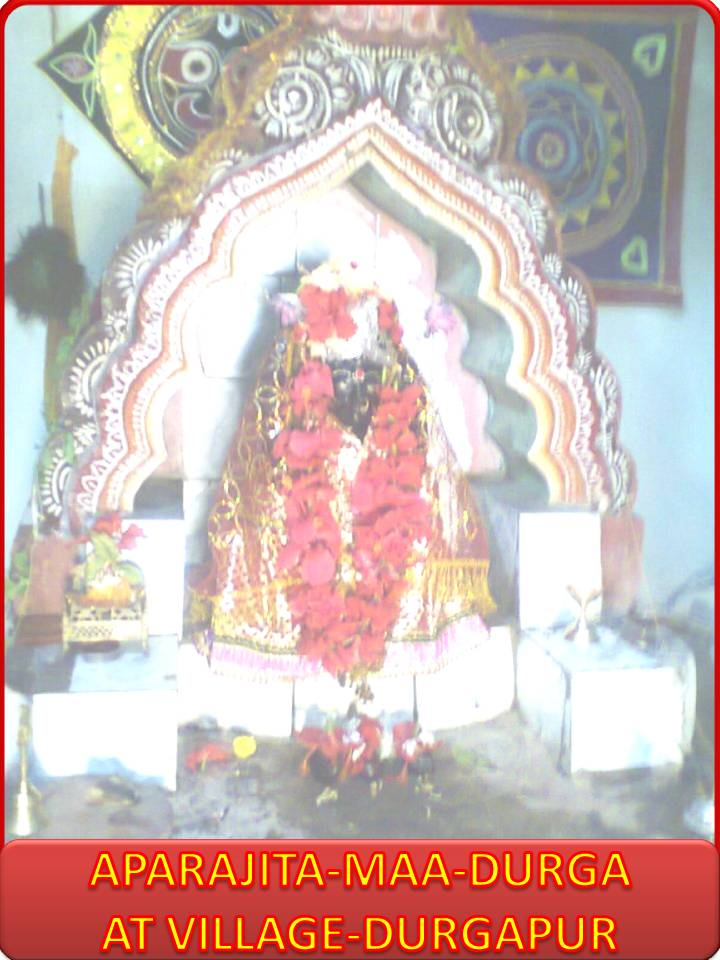
APARAJITA-MAA-DURGA

DOORDARSHAN LPT IN VILLAGE-DURGAPUR
