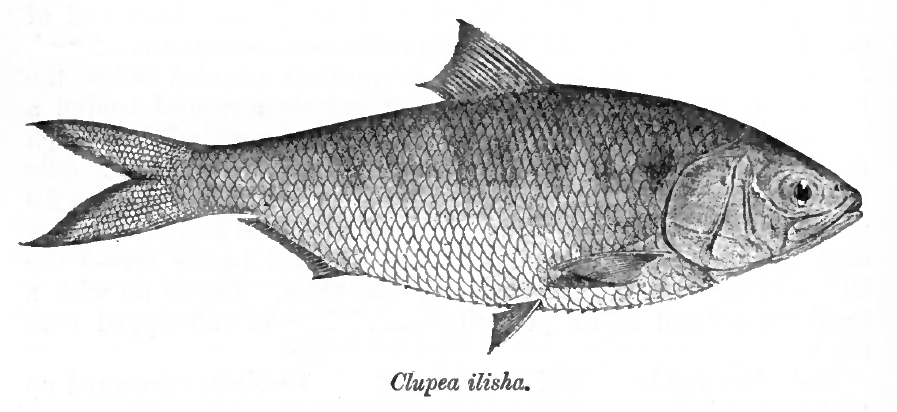

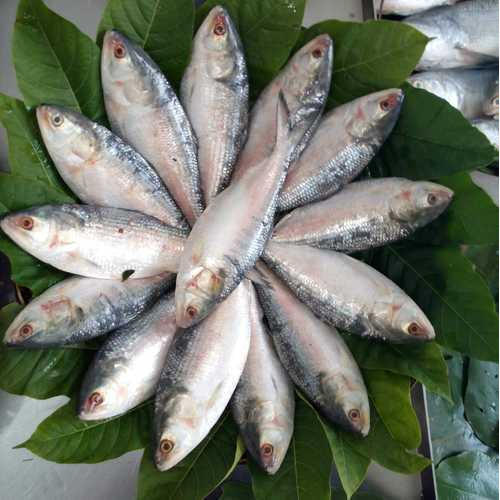

Conservation status
- Least Concern (IUCN 3.1) (Global)

- Near Threatened (IUCN 3.1) (Persian Gulf)

Scientific classification
- Kingdom: Animalia
- Phylum: Chordata
- Class: Actinopterygii
- Division: Teleostei
- Order: Clupeiformes
- Family: Dorosomatidae
- Genus: Tenualosa
- Species: T. ilisha

Binomial name
- Tenualosa ilisha F. Hamilton, 1822

Synonyms
- Clupanodon ilisha Hamilton, 1822; Clupea ilisha (Hamilton, 1822); Hilsa ilisha (Hamilton, 1822); Macrura ilisha (Hamilton, 1822); Tenualosa illisha (Hamilton, 1822); Tenualosa illsha (Hamilton, 1822); Clupea palasah Cuvier, 1829

= Ilish =

Species of fish related to the herring and other fish such as Shads and Sardines

The ilish (Tenualosa ilisha) (Bengali: ইলিশ, romanized: iliś), also known as the ilishi, hilsa, pulasa, hilsa herring or hilsa shad, is a species of fish related to the herring, in the family Clupeidae. It is a very popular and sought-after food in the Bengal region and area and is the national fish of Bangladesh. It is also the state fish of the Indian state of West Bengal.

As of 2023, 97% of the world's total ilish supply originates in Bangladesh. The fish contributes about 12% of the total fish production and about 1.15% of GDP of the country. On 6 August 2017, the Department of Patents, Designs and Trademarks under the Ministry of Industries in Bangladesh declared ilish as a Geographical Indication of Bangladesh. About 450,000 people are directly involved in the catching of the fish as a large part of their livelihood; around four to five million people are indirectly involved with the trade.

== Common names ==
Other names for the fish include jatka, illi, ilish de foundever, ellis, palla fish, hilsha, ilih etc. (Assamese: ইলীহ/ইলীহি: ilih/ilihi, Bengali: ইলিশ, romanized: iliś, Boro: इलिस, Gujarati: મોદાર/પાલ્વા: Modar or Palva, Odia: ଇଲିଶି, romanized: iliśi, Sindhī: پلو مڇي pallo machhi, Tamil: பள்ளு மீன்/palla Meen, Telugu: పులస pulasa). The name ilish is also used in India's Assamese, Bengali, Odia and Boro communities. In Iraq it is called sboor (صبور). In Malaysia and Indonesia, it is commonly known as terubok. Since it is comparatively oily and tender, some Malays, especially in northern Johore, call it 'terubok umno' to distinguish it from the toli, which has many tiny bones and is not so oily. In Myanmar, it is called (ငါးသလောက်) in Burmese which derives from the Mon language word ကသလံက် with က in Mon and ငါး in Burmese meaning fish.

== Description ==
Females of the species grow larger than males, with male individuals not reaching over 46 cm (18 in). Females can reach lengths of up to 55 cm (22 in). Maturity is generally attained by the end of the first year or the start of the second, with males maturing at sizes of 26–29 cm (10–11 in) and females at 31–33 cm (12–13 in).

Ilish fins are hyaline, having no dorsal spines but 18 – 21 dorsal soft rays and anal soft rays. The belly has 30 to 33 scutes, and there is a distinct median notch in the upper jaw. Gill rakers are fine and numerous, about 100 to 250 on the lower part of the arch. The fish shows a dark blotch behind the gill opening, followed by a series of small spots along the flank in juveniles. While alive, the color of fish is silver, shot with gold and purple.

== Habitat ==
The ilish is anadromous, inhabiting pelagic-neritic regions of the sea as well as brackish and freshwater habitats. They inhabit depths of up to approximately 200 m in a tropical range; 34°N - 5°N, 42°E - 97°E. These fish live in rivers and estuaries in Bangladesh, India, Pakistan, Myanmar and the Persian Gulf area where they can be found in the Tigris and Euphrates rivers in and around Iran and southern Iraq. The ilish is found in 11 countries: Bangladesh, India, Myanmar, Pakistan, Iran, Iraq, Kuwait, Bahrain, Indonesia, Malaysia and Thailand. Bangladesh is the top hilsa-producing country in the world, followed by Myanmar and then India.

== Biology ==
The species filter feeds on plankton and forages in muddy bottoms. Its diet primarily consists of Bacillariophyceae (diatoms), Chlorophyceae (green algae), and crustaceans (Copepoda and Cladocera). While adults generally feed on Chlorophyceae and Bacillariophyceae, juveniles primarily depend on crustaceans.

=== Reproduction ===
The fish schools in coastal waters and ascends up the rivers (anadromy) for around 50–100 km (31–62 mi) to spawn during the southwest monsoons (June to September and January to April). Actual peak breeding season of the fish is a topic of debate among researchers. After spawning, they return to the sea which are known as Jatka in Bangladesh (fish size up to 9 cm), although some stocks remain in rivers.

== Relation to humans ==
Ilish is an oily fish rich in omega 3 fatty acids. Recent experiments have shown its beneficial effects in decreasing cholesterol level in rats and insulin level. An estimated 97% of the total hilsa catch comes from Bangladesh. Ilish production in the country increased by 92% from 2008 to 2023.

Since the 1900s, numerous efforts have been made to breed and cultivate hilsa across South Asia, especially in India and Bangladesh. However, no significant success has been achieved in completing the fish's life cycle in captivity.

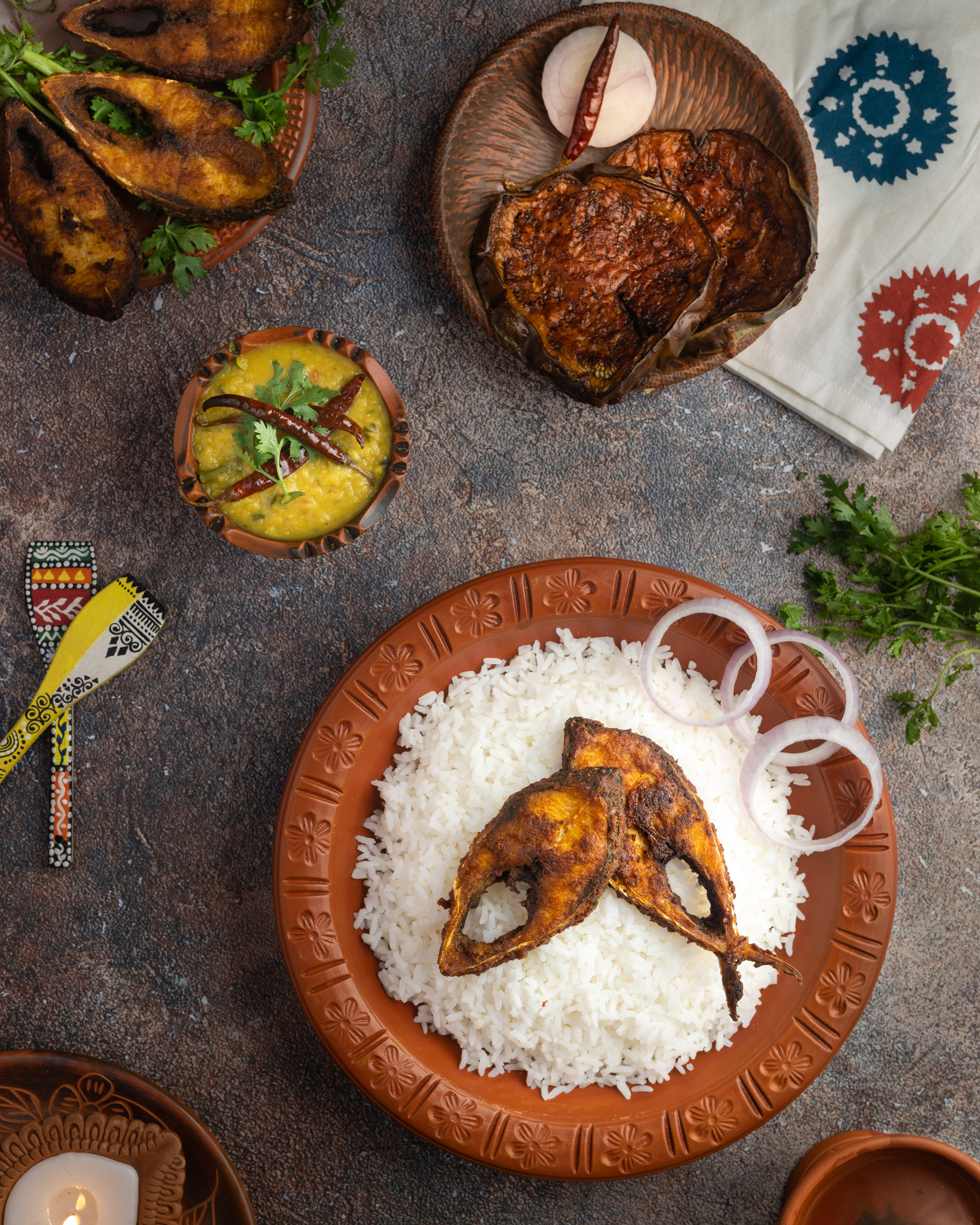
Rice and hilsha fish fry with lentils and fried aubergine

The fish is popular food among the people of South Asia and in the Middle East, but especially with Bengalis, Odias and Telugus of Coastal Andhra. Bengali fish curry is a popular dish made with mustard oil or seed. The Bengalis commonly call this dish Shorshe Ilish. It is very popular in Bengal (Bangladesh and India's West Bengal), as well as in Odisha, Tripura, Assam, Gujarat and Andhra Pradesh. In Bengal and Odisha, ilish can be smoked, fried, steamed or baked in young plantain leaves, prepared with mustard seed paste, curd, aubergine, different condiments like jira (cumin) and so on. It is said that people can cook ilish in more than 50 ways. Ilish roe is also popular as a side dish. Also, ilish can be cooked in very little oil due to its natural oiliness.

Ilish collected from Bangladesh is celebrated for its size and subtle taste.

In North America (where ilish is not always readily available) other shad fish are sometimes used as an ilish substitute, especially in Bengali cuisine. This typically occurs near the East coast of North America, where fresh shad fish, which tastes similar to ilish, can be found.

In Bangladesh, fish are caught in the Meghna-Jamuna delta, which flows into the Bay of Bengal, Meghna (lower Brahmaputra) and Jamuna rivers.

In India, Rupnarayan (which has the Kolaghater hilsa), Hooghly, Mahanadi, Narmada and Godavari rivers and the Chilika Lake are famous for their fish yields.

In the Indian state of Andhra Pradesh, hilsa takes on a special significance. Here, the term "pulasa" refers specifically to the larger, mature hilsa that migrate upstream along the Godavari River. This migratory journey is crucial, as it is believed that the Godavari's unique muddy waters contribute to the development of a richer flavour and firmer texture in the fish, compared to hilsa caught elsewhere. Due to this perceived superior quality and its limited seasonal availability (typically monsoon season), pulasa commands a significantly higher price and cultural importance in Andhra Pradesh. It is considered a rich delicacy, often referred to as the "king of fish" in Godavari Areas and features in celebratory meals and as a prized gift. The upstream migration itself is seen as a vital natural process, and the pulasa a reward for the patient fishermen who wait for its arrival.

In Pakistan, most hilsa fish are caught in the Indus River Delta in Sindh. They are also caught in the sea, but some consider the marine stage of the fish as not so tasty. The fish has very sharp and tough bones, making it problematic to eat for some.

=== Overfishing ===
Due to the demand and popularity of this species, overfishing is rampant. Fishes weighing around 2 to 3 kilograms have become rare in India, as even the smaller fish are caught using finer fishing nets as production in Bangladesh have increased. As a consequence of this, prices of the fish have risen. In the past ilish were not harvested between Vijaya Dashami and Saraswati Puja due to some informal customs of Odia and Bengali Hindus as it is the breeding period of the fish. But as disposable incomes grew, wealthier consumers abandoned the old traditions.

The advent of finer fishing nets, advanced trawling techniques and environmental degradation of the rivers has worsened the situation. Fishermen have been ignoring calls to at least leave the juvenile "jatka" alone to repopulate the species. The fishing of the young jatka is now illegal in Bangladesh. This ban however has resulted in a rise in unemployment, as around 83,000 fishermen are unable to pursue their former livelihood for eight months every year. It has also led to the creation of a black market where jatka are sold for exorbitant prices. Furthermore, the changes brought about by global warming have led to a gradual depletion of the ilish's breeding grounds, reducing populations of the fish even further. Pollution in rivers has worsened the situation, but due to slightly better waters the fishes are found more near the Bangladesh delta. Owing to this situation ilish is used as a diplomatic trade item, most recently in the distribution of COVID-19 vaccines.

Bangladesh has regularly imposed restrictions on the export of ilish abroad, citing its scarcity. Despite this, Prime Minister Sheikh Hasina periodically lifted the ban to allow the annual export and gifted of 3,000-5,000 tonnes of fish to India during the Durga Puja, popularly known as "Hilsa Diplomacy". Since the fall of the Hasina government, the interim government of Bangladesh has imposed a ban on ilish exports, which was partially lifted on 21 September 2024 to allow for the export of 3,000 tonnes of fish for Durga Puja.

=== Bangladesh ===
Abundance of hilsa fish in Bangladesh

In Bangladesh, about 2.5 million people are directly or indirectly involved in hilsa-related sectors such as harvesting, transportation, marketing, and retail. The hilsa fish plays a major role in employment generation and poverty alleviation, particularly in coastal and island regions.

According to the IUCN Red List of Bangladesh (2000), the hilsa fish is not currently considered a threatened species in the country.

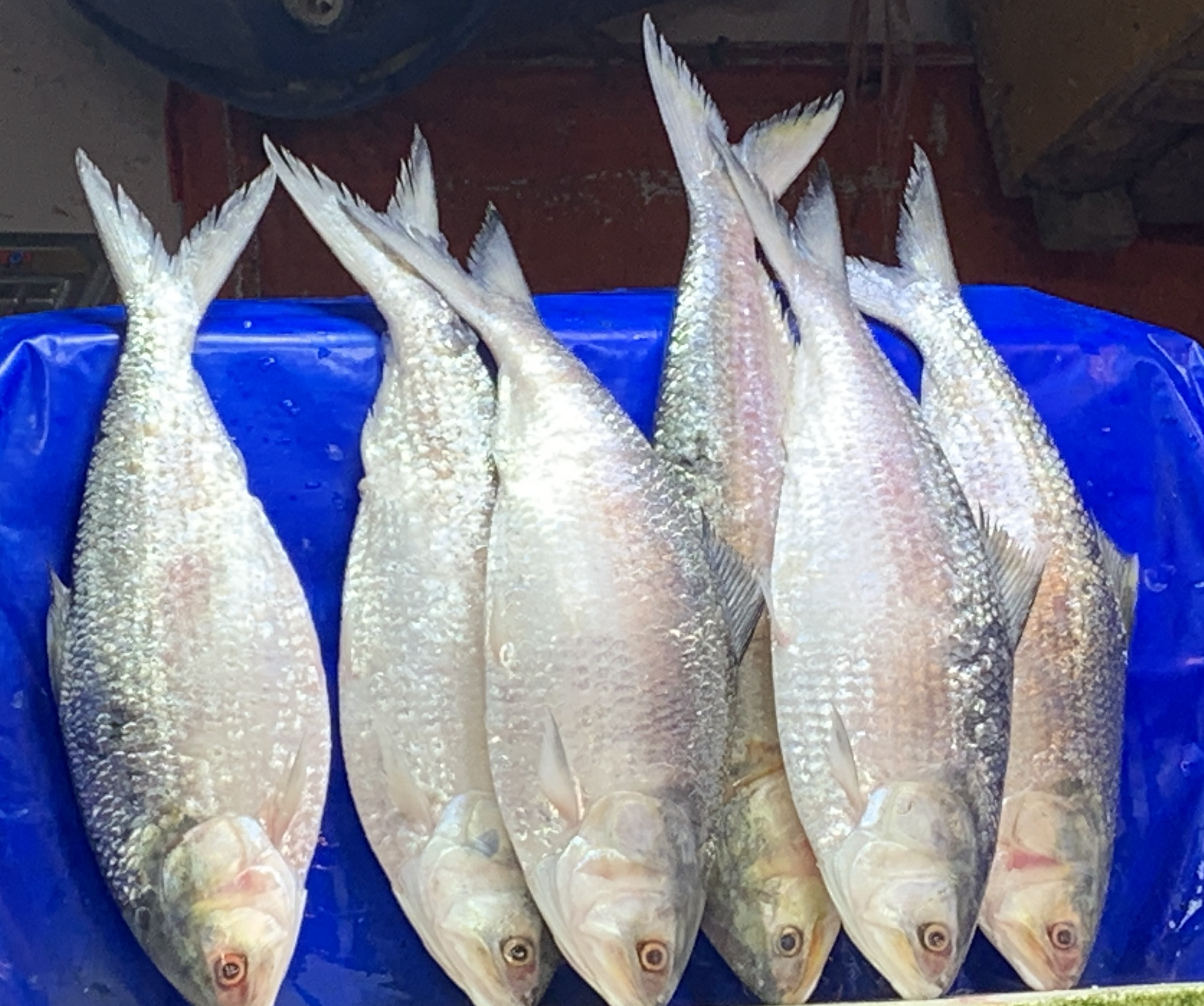
Freshly caught ilish fish (hilsa), neatly arranged at a bustling local fish market in Dhaka, Bangladesh.

However, due to a decline in hilsa numbers, the government imposed a ban in 2002 on catching both brood hilsa and juvenile hilsa (jatka). A fishing ban during the breeding season was also introduced. In 2008–09, the country produced 299,000 metric tons of hilsa, which increased to 550,000 metric tons in 2019–20. This accounts for approximately 12% of total fish production in Bangladesh. The current market value is about 210 billion BDT.

As a result, while hilsa production has declined in 10 other countries due to overfishing and pollution, in Bangladesh the catch has increased by 8–10% annually up to 2021. Among the 11 hilsa-producing nations, Bangladesh ranks first in the world. In the 2022–23 fiscal year, hilsa production reached 565,000 metric tons. In 2023–24, it rose slightly to 571,000 metric tons.

Hilsa contributes around 1% to Bangladesh's GDP. Annual exports bring in nearly 3 billion BDT in foreign currency. Around 86% of the world's total hilsa catch comes from Bangladesh.

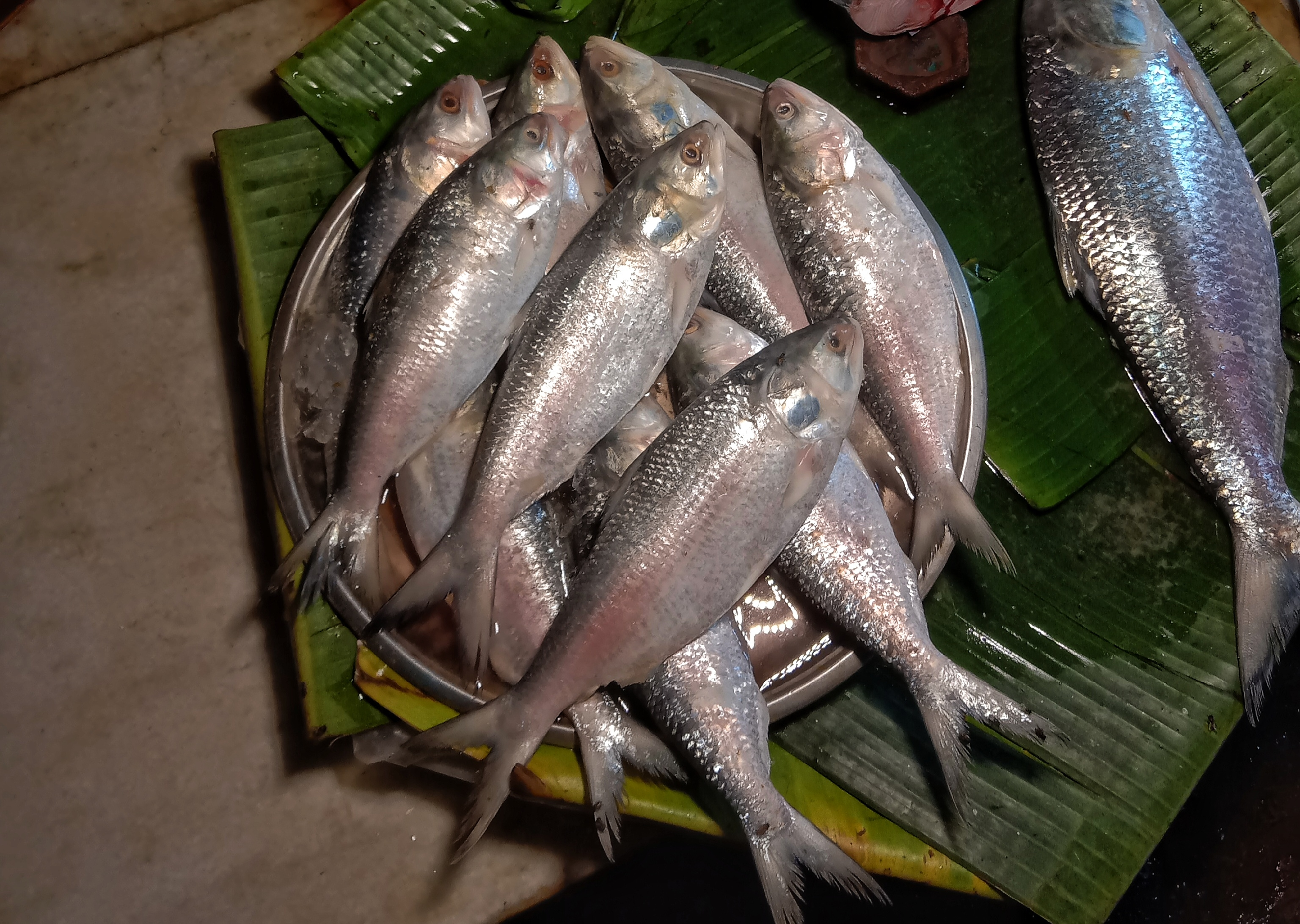
Hilsa fishes for sale at fish market in West Bengal, India.

Over the past 10 years, hilsa production has increased by 66%.

In 2023, Bangladesh exported 1,300 metric tons of hilsa to India.

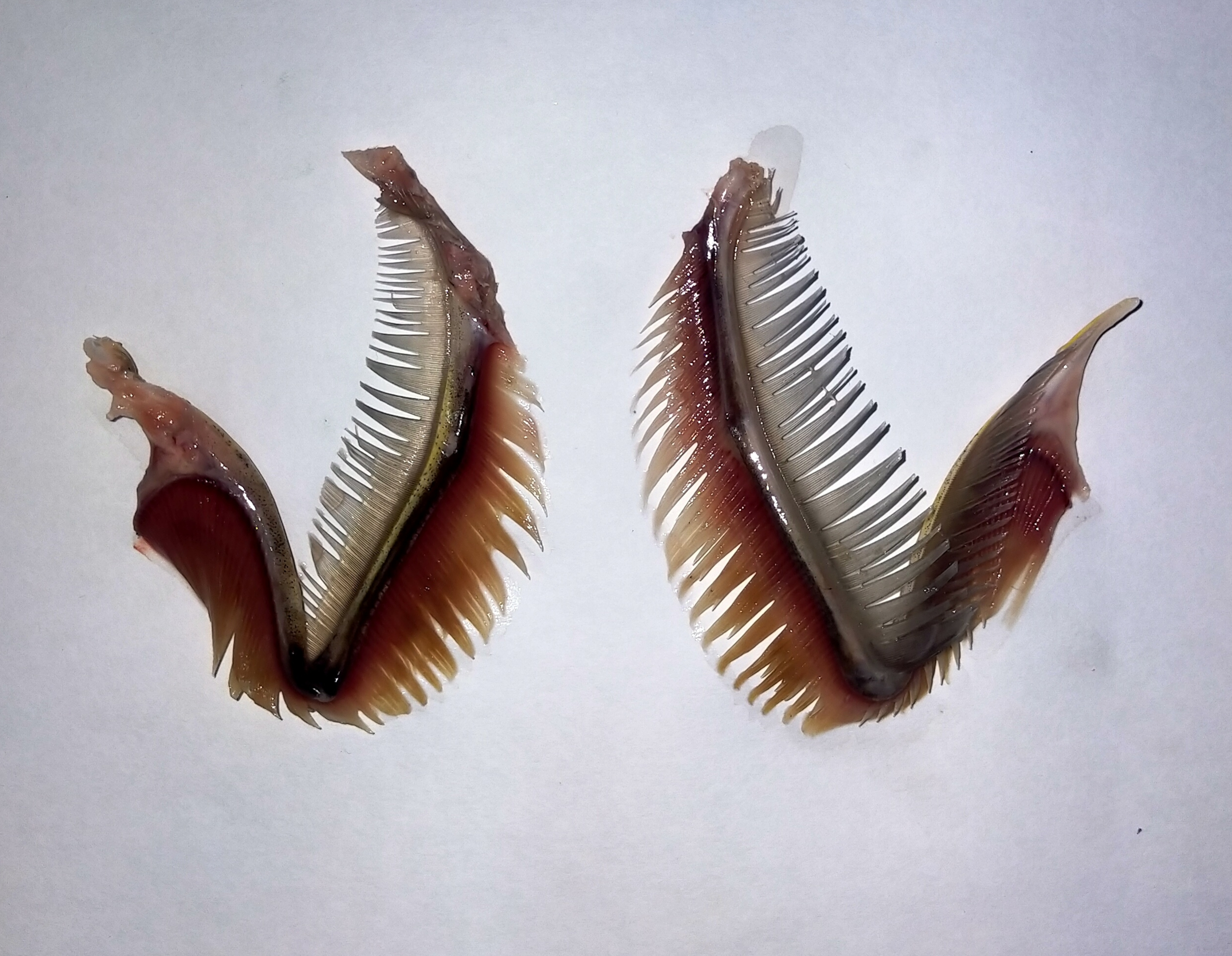
Comblike gill raker in the gill of Tenualosa ilisha

Fishing bans are enforced in the following periods:

- In India: April 15 – June 14 (61 days), varies by region.
- In Myanmar: May 16 – August 31 (91 days).
- In Bangladesh: May 20 – July 23 (65 days).

=== In culture ===
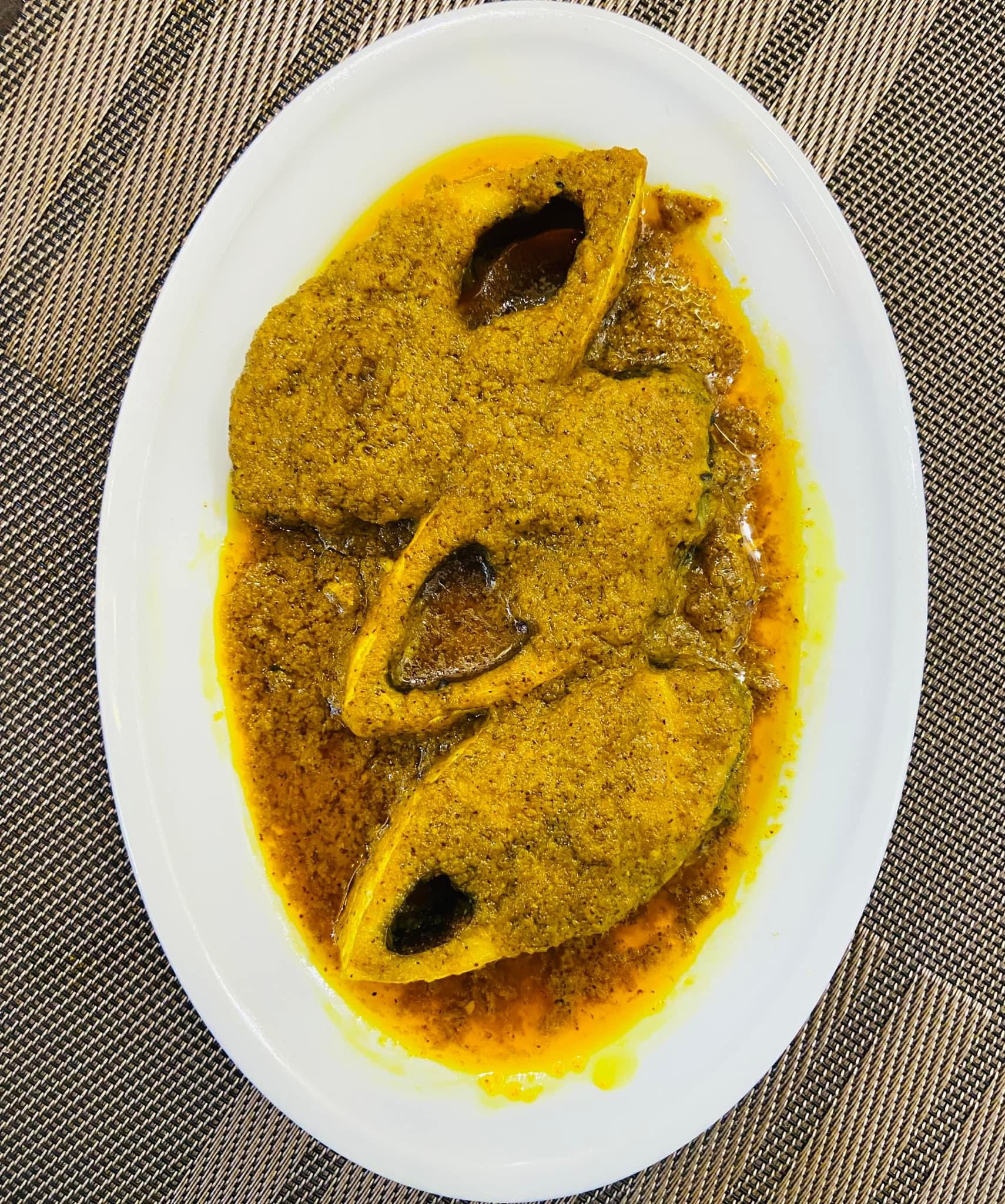
Shorshe ilish, a dish of smoked ilish with mustard seeds, has been an important part of Bengali cuisine.

- Ilish is the national fish of Bangladesh.
- In Andhra Pradesh, the saying goes "Pustelu ammi ayina Pulasa tinocchu", meaning roughly "It's worth eating Pulasa/Ilish even if you have to sell your mangala sutra". Hilsa is also known as pulasa in Godavari districts of the state. The name Pulasa stays with the fish for a limited period between July–Sept of a year, when floods raise the Godavari River. This time the fish is in high demand and can sometimes reach about $100 per kilo.
- In many Bengali Hindu families, a pair of ilish fishes (Bengali: Jora Ilish) are bought on auspicious days, for example for special prayers or puja days like for the Hindu Goddess of music, art and knowledge Saraswati Puja, which takes place in the beginning of spring or on the day of Lakshmi Puja (the Goddess of Wealth and Prosperity) which takes place in autumn. Some people offer the fish to the goddess Lakshmi, without which the Puja is sometimes thought to be incomplete. It is often given as gifts (Bengali: tattwa) in Bengali weddings.

Ilish is fried on mustard oil

- Hilsa is also known in Sindh as Pallo Machi and is important part of Sindhi cuisine, prepared with numerous cooking methods. It can be deep fried and garnished with local spices, can be cooked with onions and potatoes into a traditional fish meal or barbequed. The fish often has roe, which is called "aani" in Sindhi and is enjoyed as a delicacy. It is often fried alongside the palla and served with the fish fillets.
- The rivalry of East Bengal Club and Mohun Bagan, two football clubs of Kolkata, is celebrated by food. When East Bengal wins, an ilish (hilsha) dish is cooked by the East Bengal supporters. Similarly, when Mohun Bagan wins, a chingri (prawn) dish is prepared by the Mohun Bagan supporters. These items often occur in the tifos of these respective clubs.

== See also ==
- Bangladeshi cuisine
- Bengali cuisine
- Cuisine of Odisha
- Environmental impact of fishing
