= Banki =

Banki may refer to:

== Places ==
=== India ===
- Banki State, a princely state in modern-day Odisha
  - Banki, Odisha, capital of the princely state
- Banki, Uttar Pradesh
- Barabanki District

=== Elsewhere ===
- Bańki, Poland
- Banki, Croatia, a village near Poreč

== People ==
- Donát Bánki (1859–1922), Hungarian engineer, inventor of the carburetor
- Erik Bánki (born 1970), Hungarian parliamentarian
- Mahmoud Reza Banki (born 1976), Iranian-American scientist
- Muhammad al-Banki (died 2010), Bahraini philosopher and writer
- Zsuzsa Bánki (1921–1998), Hungarian actress

== Other uses ==
- The word for "bank" in many languages
- Banki syndrome, a rare medical disorder
- Banki turbine, a type of water turbine
- Kamen Rider Banki, a character from Kamen Rider Hibiki
- United States v. Banki, 2011 case of the U.S. Second Circuit Court of Appeals against Mahmoud Reza Banki
- Young Communist League of Israel, the youth wing of the Israeli Communist Party

== See also ==
- Banky, a surname and given name
