= Banki Assembly constituency =

Constituency of the Odisha legislative assembly in India

Coordinates: 20.378°N 85.53°E

Banki
- Constituency No. 88 for the Odisha Legislative Assembly

Constituency details
- Country: India
- Region: East India
- State: Odisha
- Division: Central Division
- District: Cuttack
- Lok Sabha constituency: Cuttack
- Established: 1951
- Total electors: 2,19,513 (Note: as on 2024) (Note: as data published by election commission)
- Reservation: None

Member of Legislative Assembly
- 17th Odisha Legislative Assembly
- Incumbent Devi Ranjan Tripathy
- Party: Biju Janata Dal
- Elected year: 2024

Banki is a Vidhan Sabha constituency of Cuttack district, Odisha. Following 2008 delimitation, Gobindpur Assembly constituency was subsumed into this constituency.

This constituency includes Banki, Banki block, Banki-Dampada block and eight Gram panchayats (Narajmarthapur, Ramdaspur, Madhupur, Belagachhia, Dadhapatana, Kunheipada, Mundali and Sribantapur) of Barang block.

== Elected members ==
Vote share of winning candidates
2024	41.31%
2019	46.44%
2014	58.69%
2009	54.79%
2004	49.38%
2000	57.60%
1995	48.63%
1990	56.08%
1985	61.34%
1980	43.14%
1977	53.69%

Since its formation in 1951, 17 elections were held till date.

List of members elected from Banki constituency are:

Year	Member	Party
2024	Devi Ranjan Tripathy	Biju Janata Dal
2019	Devi Ranjan Tripathy	Biju Janata Dal
2014	Pravat Tripathy	Biju Janata Dal
2009	Pravat Tripathy	Biju Janata Dal
2004	Debasis Pattnaik	Indian National Congress
2000	Pravat Tripathy	Biju Janata Dal
1995	Pravat Tripathy	Janata Dal
1990	Ghanashyam Sahoo	Janata Dal
1985	Akshaya Kumar Patnaik	Indian National Congress
1980	Akshaya Kumar Patnaik	Indian National Congress (I)
1977	Jogesh Chandra Rout	Indian National Congress
1974	Jogesh Chandra Rout	Independent politician
1971	Gokulanand Praharaj	Utkal Congress
1967	Jogesh Chandra Rout	Independent politician
1961	Gokulanand Praharaj	Indian National Congress
1957	Jogesh Chandra Rout	Indian National Congress
1951	Gokulanand Praharaj	Socialist Party

== Election results ==
=== 2024 ===
Voting were held on 25 May 2024 in 3rd phase of Odisha Assembly Election & 6th phase of Indian General Election. Counting of votes was on 4 June 2024. In 2024 election, Biju Janata Dal candidate Devi Ranjan Tripathy defeated Bharatiya Janata Party candidate Tusara Kanta Chakrabarty by a margin of 17,026 votes.

2024 Odisha Vidhan Sabha Election, Banki
Party	Candidate	Votes	%	±%
BJD	Devi Ranjan Tripathy	69,214	41.31	
BJP	Tusara Kanta Chakrabarty	52,188	31.15	
INC	Debasis Patnaik	42,899	25.6	
NOTA	None of the above	885	0.53	
Majority		17,026	10.16	
Turnout		1,67,544	76.33	
BJD hold				

=== 2019 ===
In 2019 election, Biju Janata Dal candidate Devi Ranjan Tripathy defeated Indian National Congress candidate Debasis Patnaik by a margin of 24,118 votes.

2019 Vidhan Sabha Election, Banki
Party	Candidate	Votes	%	±%
BJD	Devi Ranjan Tripathy	74,599	46.44	
INC	Debasis Patnaik	50,481	31.43	
BJP	Subhransu Mohan Padhi	32,541	20.26	
NOTA	None of the above	972	0.61	
Majority		24,118	15.01	
Turnout		1,60,635	76.57	
BJD hold				

=== 2014 ===
In 2014 election, Biju Janata Dal candidate Pravata Kumar Tripathy defeated Indian National Congress candidate Rabindra Kumar Mallick by a margin of 43,758 votes.

2014 Vidhan Sabha Election, Banki
Party	Candidate	Votes	%	±%
BJD	Pravata Kumar Tripathy	85,809	58.69	
INC	Rabindra Kumar Mallick	42,051	28.76	
BJP	Ajaya Kumar Swain	8,672	5.93	
None of the above	None of the above	986	0.68	
Majority		43,758	29.93	
Turnout		1,46,195	76.65	
Registered electors		1,88,489		
BJD hold				

=== 2009 ===
In 2009 election, Biju Janata Dal candidate Pravata Kumar Tripathy defeated Indian National Congress candidate Debasis Patnaik by a margin of 23,445 votes.

2009 Vidhan Sabha Election, Banki
Party	Candidate	Votes	%	±%
BJD	Pravata Kumar Tripathy	70,731	54.79	−
INC	Debasis Patnaik	47,286	36.63	−
BJP	Subhransu Mohan Padhi	8,056	6.24	−
Majority		23,445	18.16 (Note: %of total valid votes)	−
Turnout		1,29,095	71.52	−
Registered electors		1,80,508		
BJD gain from INC		Swing	▼0.69 (Note: 2004 Voter turnout was 72.21%)	
