= Banki, Odisha =

Banki
- Town
- Location in Odisha, India Banki (India)
- Coordinates: 20.38°N 85.53°E
- Country: India
- State: Odisha
- District: Cuttack
- Elevation: 48 m (157 ft)

Population (2011)
  - Total: 17,521

Languages
  - Official: Odia
- Time zone: UTC+5:30 (IST)
- PIN: 754008
- Vehicle registration: OR/OD 05 XX XXXX

Banki is a town and a Subdivision, Legislative Council constituency no. 88 and Notified Area Council in Cuttack district in the state of Odisha, India. Banki is known for the Charchika Temple, dedicated to the deity of Chamunda, the eight armed goddess and incarnation of Durga. In the 2024 Odisha Assembly elections current MLA of Banki is Devi Ranjan Tripathy.

== Toponym ==
Banki is part of the original Bankigarh, the native king of Banki State. The word Banki is derived from Bakra Durg, as the fort of king of Banki is slightly round shaped, the Oriya word Bakra implying bend/round, was the source of origin. The name later used in folk Oriya as Banka Durg later misinterpreted as Banki from Banka.

== History ==
Banki was a zamindari state situated in the western part of Cuttack District. The Mahanadi River flowed along the northern part of the state. The area was ruled by the Dhal Dynasty , whose dynasty was founded by Balabhadra Dhal. Banki was annexed by the British in 1840. The population of Banki was 56,900 in 1881. The rulers of Banki bore the title of Raja .

The Dhal clan traces its ancestral origin to the Kalachuris of Tripuri , also known as the Kalachuris of Dahala or the Chedi Kalachuris, an ancient ruling dynasty of Central India whose capital was Tripuri (present-day Madhya Pradesh). The Kalachuris traditionally claimed descent from the Haihaya lineage of the Chandravanshi Lunar Dynasty .

The Dhal clan identifies itself as Chandravanshi Kshatriya and traditionally belongs to the Khandayat Kshatriya community of Odisha, with Mudgalasya Gotra. According to clan tradition, four brothers migrated from the Rewa region to Odisha during the reign of King Anangabhima Deva III and were received as guests of the Gajapati ruler. They subsequently established important branches and settlements associated with Banki , Dhalbhumgarh , Dampara and Guhali . Among these, Guhali, in Jajpur district, is traditionally regarded as the principal branch of the Dhal clan. The Choudhary of Guhali and his brothers are associated with approximately 11 nearby villages, forming an extended network of Dhal lineages. According to family tradition, the younger brother of the Choudhary of Guhali established Kalamatia village and the Kalamatia Zamindari, situated in Bari Tahasil of Jajpur district, Odisha .

Members of the clan generally use Dhal as their surname, while certain branches and individuals use traditional titles and honorific designations such as Srichandan, Harichandan Samanta, Choudhary, Dakshina Ray Mohapatra, dhalsamanta, uttarsingh and Ray. Despite variations in surnames and titles, these lineages are traditionally regarded as belonging to the wider Dhal Dynasty .

The king of Banki got married with Rajkumari Sukadei of Badamba kingdom, the daughter of king of Badamba. The king of Khurda challenged Banki's king for a war. King of Banki was killed in the war and Sukadei got widowed. She vowed to take revenge from king of khurda for her husband's death. She took help of her brother, the prince of Badamba to win the war. She defeated the king of Khurda but did not kill him as she did not want the queen of Khurda to get widowed like her. Sukadei annexed some parts of Khurda with Banki and took the title Maharani.

After independence of our country in 1947, Banki became a town.

== Geography ==
Banki is located at 20.38°N 85.53°E on the southern bank of the river Mahanadi in the southwest part of Cuttack district. It has an average elevation of 48 metres (157 feet). Banki is 58 kilometers away from the state capital of Bhubaneswar to the southeast, 47 kilometers from the district headquarters in Cuttack to the east, 35 kilometers away from Khurda in south, 45 kilometers away from Dhenkanal and 64 kilometers away from Nayagarh.

Banki has a tropical wet and dry climate according to Köppen classification system. Summer is hot as maximum temperature reaches 43 °C, winter is chilly and minimum temperature can drop around 9 °C. The rainy season is from June to September and the annual rainfall is between 75 and 150 cm. The average summer temperature is 40 °C and average winter temperature is 13 °C.

== Demographics ==
As of the 2011 India census, Banki had a population of 17,521. Males constitute 52%, of the population and females 48%. Banki has an average literacy rate of 82%, higher than the national average of 74.04%; with 55% of the males and 45% of females literate. 9.16% of the population is under 6 years of age.

The main religion practised in Banki is Hinduism. Other religions are Islam and Christianity.

1. Hinduism 96.86% 2. Islam 2.4% 3. Christianity 1.10% 4. Buddhist 0.5%

== Culture and tourism ==
Banki has many tourist attractions and places of worship, such as Charchika Temple, Anshupa Lake, Chandaka Elephant Sanctuary, Shri Mahima mani Temple of Ragadi, Shri Singhanatha Temple of Patapur, Arachandi Temple, Maa Bramhei Temple of Sahadapada Village, Sunadei Hill, Kalika Prasad, Devi Dwara of Gayal Bank, Bhagabat Goswami Temple Bilipada, Akhandeswar the Lord Shiva temple (Harirajpur) and Maa Ratneswari temple in Harirajpur village, Nilakantheswar Temple in Kuspangi village, Pandaba Bakhara Hill (Padanpur Village), Maha parbat Hill (Dhansar) etc.

The cuisine of Banki includes popular dishes such as the Prasad of goddess Charchika (made of fish). Many residents are vegetarians, but non-vegetarian items such as chicken and mutton are preferred. Rice, lentils (locally referred to as dal), fish, prawns, meat and vegetables form the staple diet. There are also roadside dhabas that sell meat and vegetarian dishes. Sweets such as dahi boondi, rasagola, and chamcham are also prepared.

Handicrafts called Chandua are made by the people, sarees and dresses being woven by women. Fishing is also a common practice and the collected fish is sold in local markets. The fishing industry in Banki is famous due to the illish, caught in the Mahanadi River by the fishermen.

=== Charchika Temple ===
Charchika Temple, one of the oldest Shakti places in India, is located here. This temple is situated on top of a small hillock Ruchika Parvata on the banks of the Renuka river. The goddess is an eight-armed goddess Chamunda, also known as Maa Charchika Devi. She is seated on a prostrate human body and wearing a garland of human skulls. She displays khadga, shula, katari and varadamudra in her four right hands whereas the four left hands represent severed head, blood-cup, ‘’damru’’ and leaving a finger of the remaining hand soaked in blood. One more temple of Maa Charchika is at Mathura, near the Yamuna river.

== Politics ==
The current MLA from Banki Assembly Constituency is Devi Ranjan Tripathy, who represented the party of Biju Janata Dal in the state elections of 2019. The previous MLAs were Pravat Tripathy who won this seat in 2014, 2009 and 2000 representing BJD and in 1995 representing JD, Debasis Patnaik in 2004 who representing INC, Ghanasyam Sahoo of JD in 1990, Akshay Kumar Patnaik representing INC in 1985 and representing INC(I) in 1980, and Dr. Jogesh Chandra Rout of INC in 1977.

Banki is part of Cuttack Lok Sabha constituency.

Banki N.A.C. is the most prominent part of Banki subdivision, and consists of Banki town market and area around it mainly Sahadapada, Patapur, Gopalpur, Dangipita, Charchika, Srichandanpur, Ranapur, Khamarang, Bedapur, Sisua & Chakapada villages. It is divided into 17 wards. The chairman is elected within the wardmember/councilors of these wards. Current Chairman of Banki NAC is Manika Sahu of Biju Janata Dal.
