= Nunes v. CNN =

2019 American lawsuit

Nunes v. CNN (Devin G. Nunes v. Cable News Network, Inc.) was a defamation lawsuit filed by US Representative Devin Nunes (R-CA) in Virginia against media corporation CNN on December 3, 2019, for $435 million.

The suit was filed in the United States District Court for the Eastern District of Virginia under docket (3:19-cv-00889).

The suit alleges that CNN reported that Nunes traveled to Vienna in December 2018, and met with Viktor Shokin, the former Ukrainian prosecutor general, about investigating Joe Biden. The suit claims this is untrue and that Nunes was in Libya, followed by Malta.

Nunes had previously filed lawsuits against The McClatchy Company, Esquire Magazine and Twitter on news items and stories unrelated to the presidential impeachment proceedings.

On May 22, 2020, U.S. District Judge Robert E. Payne granted CNN's request to transfer the suit to the Southern District of New York, finding "no logical connection" between the lawsuit and the Virginia court where it was filed, and citing "significant concerns" that the lawsuit had been filed in Virginia for the purpose of forum shopping.

Federal judge Laura Taylor Swain dismissed the suit on February 19, 2021.
