= Judge Keenan =

Judge Keenan may refer to:

- Barbara Milano Keenan (born 1950), judge of United States Court of Appeals for the Fourth Circuit
- John F. Keenan (born 1929), judge for the United States District Court for the Southern District of New York
