= United States v. Banki =

American legal case

- Court: United States Court of Appeals for the Second Circuit
- Full case name: United States v. Mahmoud Reza Banki
- Argued: February 15, 2011
- Decided: October 24, 2011
- Citation: 685 F.3d 99

Case history
- Prior history: 733 F. Supp. 2d 404 (S.D.N.Y. 2010)
- Subsequent history: Opinion amended, February 22, 2012.

Court membership
- Judges sitting: José A. Cabranes, Rosemary S. Pooler, Denny Chin

Case opinions
- Majority: Chin, joined by a unanimous court

In United States v. Banki, 685 F.3d 99 (2nd Cir. 2011) the Second Circuit Court of Appeals overturned the conviction of Mahmoud Reza Banki. Banki had been convicted of multiple crimes related to allegedly conspiring to violate United States sanctions against Iran by transferring large amounts of money — totaling some $3.4 million — from Iran to the United States.

In 2010, Mahmoud Reza Banki, an Iranian-American, was arrested and prosecuted by the United States Attorney's office in New York City. He was charged in the Southern District of New York with violating the US sanctions against Iran. He was charged with conspiracy to violate the Iranian Transactions Regulations (the "ITR") and operate an unlicensed money-transmitting business and four other charges. His defense argued these transfers were necessary to protect the family's assets. He spent 22 months in prison before winning his case on appeal, with all the sanctions charges against him being dismissed. The case was permanently closed in July 2012.

Banki spoke publicly for the first time about his case at TED Talk in 2014. He has spoken before various audiences and in The Moth podcast released January 2017, Banki spoke to the personal toll of the ordeal.

== Background ==
Mahmoud Reza Banki, is an Iranian-American and a US citizen. He immigrated to the United States in the 1990s to attend college at the University of California at Berkeley and later at Princeton University. He was working at McKinsey & Company at the time of the case.

Between 2006 and 2009, Banki's family sent him approximately $3.4 million from his parents' divorce settlement, from Iran to the US. The money came into a single bank account at Bank of America, over multiple transfers through an informal money transfer systems which the defendant argued was legal and the only means of sending money out of Iran at the time. Banki used most of this money to purchase an apartment in downtown Manhattan. Prosecutors argued that over this three-year period, Banki had allegedly violated the US-imposed Iran sanctions.

== Sanctions history ==
The United States enforces sanctions against several countries worldwide. These sanctions are instituted by the Office of Foreign Assets Control (OFAC) under the Department of Treasury of the United States.

The US Treasury's OFAC designates family money as exempt from the sanctions law.

A detailed letter by former head of the Office of Foreign Assets Control (OFAC), Richard Newcomb, to the court during the case of US v. Banki outlined the sanctions regimen and intent; undermining the prosecutor's case against Banki as not being in line with the practices of OFAC or the intent of the sanctions. Nor were the charges in line with the agency's approach while Richard Newcomb was head of the agency:

"The underlying purpose for these multiple U.S. economic sanctions programs against Iran was to target the Government with the use of economic methods to change the behavior of the leadership in Iran toward the United States and the international community at large, and to thwart Iran's support for and funding of terrorism, its efforts to disrupt the Middle East Peace Process and its development of weapons of mass destruction. Central to the effort was to direct and focus the sanctions impact on the Government of Iran, its leadership, its various agencies, instrumentalities, controlled entities and support structure, including Iran's Revolutionary Guard Corps, and other such organizations necessary for the support and continuation of the current Governmental hierarchy. The industrial and commercial sectors - oil and gas, financial, manufacturing and other sectors that contribute significantly to Iran's economy and the Government's ability to continue its threatening behavior were also of primary concern. The program goal was never intended to target the Iranian people. The Iranian Diaspora is large. As many as 4 million or more Iranians live as expats around the world. It is estimated that there are as many as 800,000 Iranian nationals currently resident in the United States as dual nationals, green card holders or with other visa status. A very large percentage are supporters of U.S. policy toward Iran, and it is the goal of the U.S. government to continue cultivating that support while isolating the government of Iran. In virtually all economic sanctions programs administered by OFAC (with the exception of the 1963 program against Cuba where Cuban nationals were also included as targets), including the Iran sanctions program, it was always understood that there was a dual goal and purpose – to bring as much economic pressure as possible to bear on the intended target without causing unintended hardship and suffering on the civilian population, the very people whose support and assistance the U.S. and the international community will need if and when a successor government emerges."

== Arrest, indictment, and charges ==
On January 7, 2010, U.S. Immigration and Customs Enforcement (ICE) agents authorized by a grand jury with a search and arrest warrant entered the residence of Mahmoud Reza Banki in New York City and arrested him. He was arraigned before Judge John F. Keenan on an indictment charging him with three counts: 1. Conspiracy to violate the U.S.-imposed Iran sanctions and conspiracy to run an unlicensed money transmittal system, 2. Violation of the Iran sanctions, and 3. Running of an unlicensed money transmittal business. The indictment accused Banki of receiving $4.7 million in violation of the Iran sanctions. Prosecutors filed a superseding indictment later changing the amount to $3.4 million and adding two false statement charges to the three initial charges.

Banki was denied bail. He was held in high and maximum security detention facilities pending trial.

== Trial at the district court and forfeiture ==
The indictment charging Banki argued that Banki should have gotten authorization in the form of a license for the money he received: "(vi) Under the ITR, any United States person who wishes to engage in a transaction otherwise prohibited by the ITR must first file an application for a license and receive approval from OFAC. 31 C.F.R. §§ 56.600, 560.501, and 501.801.".

On May 10, 2010, a three-week trial commenced where Second Circuit District judge John F. Keenan presided. The trial concluded on June 4 when the jury returned a guilty verdict on all five counts, albeit, guilty on a lesser charge of aiding and abetting rather than running a sanctions violation money transmittal system.

On June 7, 2010, despite the superseding indictment charge of $3.4 million, the same jury agreed to forfeit one bank account associated with a $6,000 transaction as the proceeds of the charges and the guilty verdict. The jury ruled that Mahmoud Reza Banki's other assets including the apartment he had purchased with the family funds he had received was not forfeitable nor was it a direct proceed of any crime.

Judge Keenan overruled the jury only in the case of the forfeiture verdict on the basis that the jury might have been "confused" and awarded the government prosecutors a money judgment order, essentially ignoring the jury verdict on forfeiture and awarding the US Attorney's office $3.4 million, to be paid by Banki.

The defense objections throughout trial were overruled. One such overruling was the judge's decision not to allow for jury instructions on the family money exception from the sanctions law. Essentially, the jury was not told that transfer of family money is legal; that family money can be sent to and received from Iran and is an exception in the US sanctions law against Iran. This would become a material issue at the appellate level and the primary reason for the reversal of the charges.

Judge Keenan also did not allow the defense to call Richard Newcomb, former head of OFAC, to testify as an expert witness on the sanctions charges despite his qualifications: he had been head of OFAC for 17 years (from 1987 to 2004), where he was the author of the sanctions law. Richard Newcomb was not only the author of the underlying sanctions regulations but in his capacity as head of OFAC he had also been in charge of enforcing the sanctions law not just against Iran but all countries US had sanctions against.

== Sentencing and imprisonment ==
During sentencing, over 120 letters of support were sent to Judge Keenan to ask for leniency. Among those were letters from Nobel Peace Laureate Shirin Ebadi and ex-Director of the Office of Foreign Assets Control (OFAC) Richard Newcomb. In a lengthy letter, Richard Newcomb made the case for Banki's innocence of the sanctions charges and highlighted that through Newcomb's administration of the sanctions program in the US the program was "never intended to target the Iranian people" and that "the Iranian-American community commonly and openly uses remittance forwarding service providers, including hawalas to move family funds back and forth between the United States and Iran, typically with no penalty, civil or criminal."

On August 16, 2010, Judge Keenan sentenced Banki to 30 months in prison.

Shortly after being sentenced Banki filed for appeal. The Iranian American Bar Association along with 10 other advocacy and civil rights groups filed a separate amicus brief with the United States Court of Appeals for the Second Circuit. The amicus brief argued that U.S.-Iran sanctions "are not aimed at the Iranian people, and therefore they contain exemptions permitting certain humanitarian transactions and family remittances."

For about 11 months (from January 7, 2010, to December 1, 2010) Banki was held in high and maximum-security detention centers in Manhattan and Brooklyn (MCC and MDC). For December 2010 Banki was transferred to the Taft Correctional Institution's deportation prison outside Bakersfield in California. In January 2011 Banki was transferred to the lower-security Taft prison, where he remained pending the appellate decision. Upon release Banki had served 665 days, nearly 22 months in prison.

== Appellate reversal ==
On October 24, 2011, the United States Court of Appeals for the Second Circuit ruled in favor of Banki and reversed the sanctions charges against him. Judge Keenan's court ordered Banki's release on November 2, 2011.

The Appellate court ruled that Judge John F. Keenan had erred at trial in denying Banki's defense's request to instruct the jury on the law that specifically exempts family money as an exception to the sanctions law, permitting such transfers without the need for a license: "However, U.S. depository institutions are permitted to handle funds transfers, through intermediary third-country banks, to or from Iran or for the direct or indirect benefit of the Government of Iran or a person in Iran, arising from several types of underlying transactions, including: a) a noncommercial family remittance; b) an exportation to Iran or importation from Iran of information and informational materials; c) a travel-related remittance; d) a payment for the shipment of a donation of articles to relieve human suffering; or e) a transaction authorized by OFAC through a specific or general license.".

The final appellate court brief stated: "Banki's conviction [on the sanctions charges] cannot stand".

Prosecutors reopened the case, seeking a retrial in February 2012. However, after a few months of delay and assignment of a new judge, the case was closed criminally with no option for future civil or criminal prosecution. Rather than pay for the high cost of a second criminal defense trial, Banki agreed to relinquish $710,000 of his assets. In exchange, prosecutors agreed without going through a second trial that Banki was not guilty of the sanctions charges, and that they would not pursue the criminal or civil cases further.

The case was permanently closed on July 24, 2012, with the final word being the success of Banki's appeal, finding that he was not guilty of the sanctions charges for which he had been arrested imprisoned for 22 months. In the final court hearing Banki's prison record was cleared. Judge Engelmayer in clearing Banki's prison record called him a "talented man, even brilliant". The judge also stated: ". . . the damage to Mr. Banki's life brought about by his lengthy incarceration, occasioned by his confinement, cannot be measured only by the 22 months in which he lost his liberty and which he cannot get back".

== Aftermath ==
Since his release, Banki has completed a Masters' in Business Administration from UCLA Anderson School of Management. Banki spoke about his case for the first time publicly at a TED Conference at UCLA in 2014 in an effort to raise awareness about the justice system. He also spoke about the uncertain life path he now faces in the US and the difficulty he faces in finding employment due to his continued status as a felon despite his appellate win. There are plans for a documentary of his story.

Banki's case raises questions not just about the ambiguity and impracticality of the sanctions laws for Iranian-Americans but speaks to the broader impact that the current criminal justice system can have on the path of a "success story".

With support from 13 Congressmen and a Senator, Banki filed for a Presidential Pardon.
