= Kuspangi =

Coordinates: 20.522250°N 85.824572°E

Kuspangi is a second largest village in Banki-Dompara block under Banki tehsil and Cuttack district, in the state of Odisha, India. It is a main census village.

== Geography ==
Kuspangi is situated on the bank of river Mahanadi and on the feet of small hill stations of Chandaka Elephant Sanctuary. It is 11 km far away from Banki police station cum NAC. It has a beautiful green scenery around the village with fabulous climate. Anyone can't identify the village from the river side. It diminishes under the feet of small hills. It is well connected to Cuttack and Bhubaneswar through direct road link and via Banki-Khurda road.

== Occupation ==
Most people of Kuspangi are employed in agriculture. Rice and seasonal vegetables are the most common crops. Farming is seasonal, and depends on rain for moisture rather than river water although the largest river of Orissa, Mahanadi passes near the village.

In recent years, many people are doing jobs in administrative departments, military, IT sectors, law and enforcement departments, medicals, education sectors etc.

== Cultural life ==
The villagers celebrate a number of festivals during the year, including Durga Puja, Ram Navami, Diwali, Holi, with festive food such as Manda Pitha, Kakara pitha, and Arisa Pitha Villagers celebrate Ram Navami with 14 days of Ram leela Drama.

== Education ==
Kuspangi has educational institutions and schools. Those are Kuspangi High School, Kuspangi U.P. School and Kuspangi M.E. School. There are also four Anganwadi centers in Kuspangi for child education. Several students from nearby villages come to the high school for better education.
