= Malipada =

Town in Odisha, India

Malipada ମାଳିପଡ଼ା
- Town
- Location in Odisha, India
- Coordinates: 20.3006°N 85.7590°E
- Country: India
- State: Odisha
- District: Khordha
- Block: Chandaka

Government
  - Type: Gram Panchayat

Area
  - Total: 3.95 km^{2} (1.53 sq mi)

Population (2011)
  - Total: 1,658
  - Density: 420/km^{2} (1,090/sq mi)
- PIN: 754005
- Telephone code: 0674
- Vehicle registration: OD-02
- Census code: 407475

Malipada, is a Town in the Chandaka police station precinct of Khordha district in the Indian state of Odisha. It is situated on the outskirts of the state capital, Bhubaneswar, and falls under the administrative jurisdiction of the Bhubaneswar Block.

== Geography ==
Malipada is located at 20.3006°N 85.7590°E. It covers a total geographical area of 395 hectares (4.0 km^{2}). The village is situated approximately 13 kilometres (8.1 mi) from the Nandankanan Zoological Park and is part of the developing peri-urban region surrounding Bhubaneswar.

== Demographics ==
As of the 2011 Census of India, Malipada had a total population of 1,658, consisting of 841 males and 817 females. The village comprises 325 households.

- Literacy: The literacy rate of Malipada was recorded at 91.03%, which is significantly higher than the state average of 72.87%. Male literacy stands at 93.48%, while female literacy is 88.51%.
- Child Population: The population of children aged 0–6 was 175, constituting 10.55% of the total population.
- Workforce: Out of the total population, 480 individuals were engaged in work activities, with approximately 89% described as main workers (employed for more than 6 months).

== Administration ==
In accordance with the Constitution of India and the Panchayati Raj Act, the village is administered by a Sarpanch (Head of Village), who is the elected representative of the village. It falls under the jurisdiction of the Chandaka Police Station.

== Transport ==
Malipada is connected by road to the nearby urban centers of Bhubaneswar and Khordha. The nearest railway station is Bhubaneswar railway station, located approximately 15 kilometres (9.3 mi) away. The Biju Patnaik International Airport serves as the nearest airport.

== See also ==
- Khordha district
- Chandaka Elephant Sanctuary
