= Chamunda =

Hindu goddess

- Mahadevi; Goddess Of War; Goddess Of Epidemic
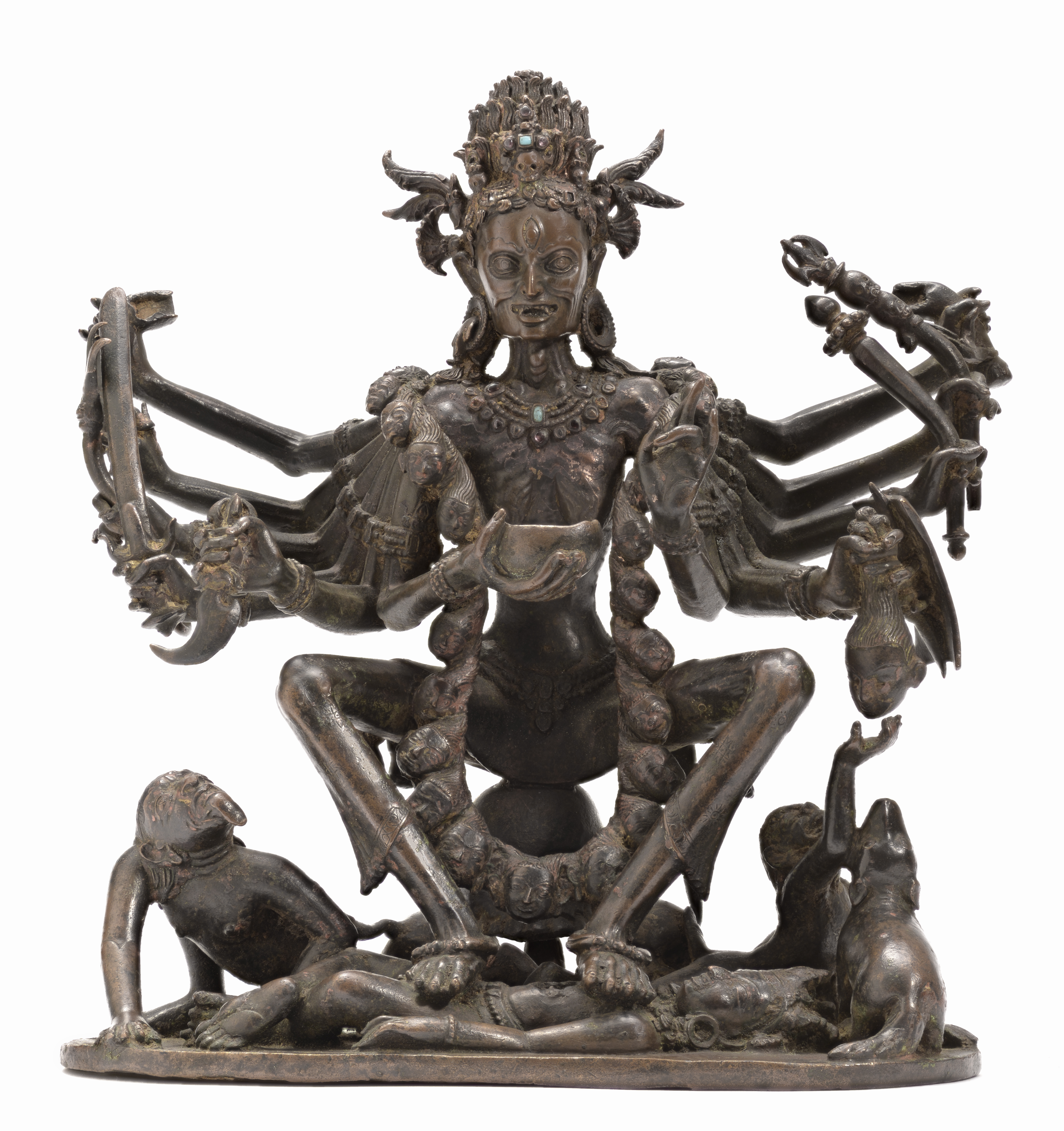
- 14th century Nepalese sculpture of Chamunda.
- Sanskrit transliteration: Cāmuṇḍā
- Devanagari: चामुण्डा
- Affiliation: Adi parashakti, Mahakali, Parvati,Durga
- Abode: Cremation grounds or fig trees
- Mantra: oṁ aiṁ hrīṁ klīṁ cāmuṇḍāyai vicce
- Weapon: Trident and Sword
- Complexion: Red
- Mount: buffalo or Dhole; Corpse (Preta)
- Gender: Female
- Consort: Shiva

Chamunda (Sanskrit: चामुण्डा, IAST: Cāmuṇḍā), also known as Chamundeshvari, Chamundi or is a fearsome form of Chandi, the Hindu mother goddess, Mahadevi and is one of the seven Matrikas.

She is also one of the chief Yoginis, a group of sixty-four or eighty-one Tantric goddesses, who are attendants of the warrior goddess Parvati. The name is a combination of Chanda and Munda, two demons whom Chamunda killed. She is closely associated with Mahakali or Durga.

The goddess is often portrayed as residing in cremation grounds or near holy fig trees. The goddess is worshipped by ritual animal sacrifices along with offerings of wine. The practice of animal sacrifices has become less common with Vaishnavite influences.

== Origins ==
Ramakrishna Gopal Bhandarkar claims that Chamunda was originally a tribal goddess, worshipped by the tribals of the Vindhya mountains range in central India. These tribes were known to offer goddesses animal as well as human sacrifices along with liquor. These methods of worship were retained in Tantric worship of Chamunda, after its assimilation into mainstream Hinduism. He proposes the fierce nature of this goddess is due to her association with Rudra or (Shiva), identified with the fire god Agni at times. Wangu also backs the theory of the tribal origins of the goddess.

== Iconography ==
In early representations of Chamunda, she is given a ferocious visage, but with a feminine figure and elegant features. However, in later representations she is generally depicted as a skeletal old women wearing an elephant or tiger hide. She is shown to have sunken eyes, dishevelled hair.

Chandi or Chamunda is depicted as black or red, she wearing a garland of severed heads or Skulls called (Mundamala). She has up to twelve arms. She holds a Damaru (drum), trishula (trident), sword, snake,a skull mace (khatvanga), thunderbolt, a severed head and panapatra (drinking vessel) or askull-bowl (kapala) in her hands. She is standing or sitting upon a 'shava' or corpse or sitting on a 'preta' or vanquished demon.

She is often depicted in a terrifying manner: her skull-bowl is filled with blood. She has a skeletal body with three eyes. Her face is fearsome with protruding teeth and long nails. Her breasts are shown sagging down with a sunken belly. She is adorned with ornaments made of bones, skulls, snakes, and scorpions. She also wears a Yajnopavita (sacred thread) of skulls. Her headdress is jata makuta, matted hair tied with snakes. A crescent moon is sometimes depicted on her head.

- Kinsley p. 147, 156. Descriptions as per Devi Mahatmya, verses 8.11-20
- "Sapta Matrikas (12th C AD)". Department of Archaeology and Museums, Government of Andhra Pradesh. Archived from the original on July 1, 2007.
- Donaldson, T. "Chamunda, The fierce, protective eight-armed mother". British Museum.
- "Chamunda, the Horrific Destroyer of Evil [India, Madhya Pradesh] (1989.121)". In Timeline of Art History. New York: The Metropolitan Museum of Art, 2000–. (October 2006)
- Kalia, pp.106–109. Her eye sockets are described as setting the world ablaze with flames. She is accompanied by spirits.

She is accompanied by demons and goblins. She is also shown to be surrounded by skeletons, ghosts and beasts like jackals, who are shown eating the flesh of the corpse the goddess sits or stands on. The jackals and her fearsome companions are sometimes depicted as drinking blood from her skull cup or the severed head she is holding, implying that Chamunda drinks the blood of the defeated enemies. This quality of drinking blood is a characteristic of all Matrikas, and Chamunda in particular. At times, she is depicted seated on an owl, or a buffalo , or Dhole. Her banner figures an eagle.

These characteristics, a contrast to the typical depictions of Hindu goddesses with beautiful faces, symbolise the inevitability of old age, death, decay and destruction. Chamunda is often seen as a form of Kali. She appears as a frightening old woman, projecting fear and horror.

== Legends ==
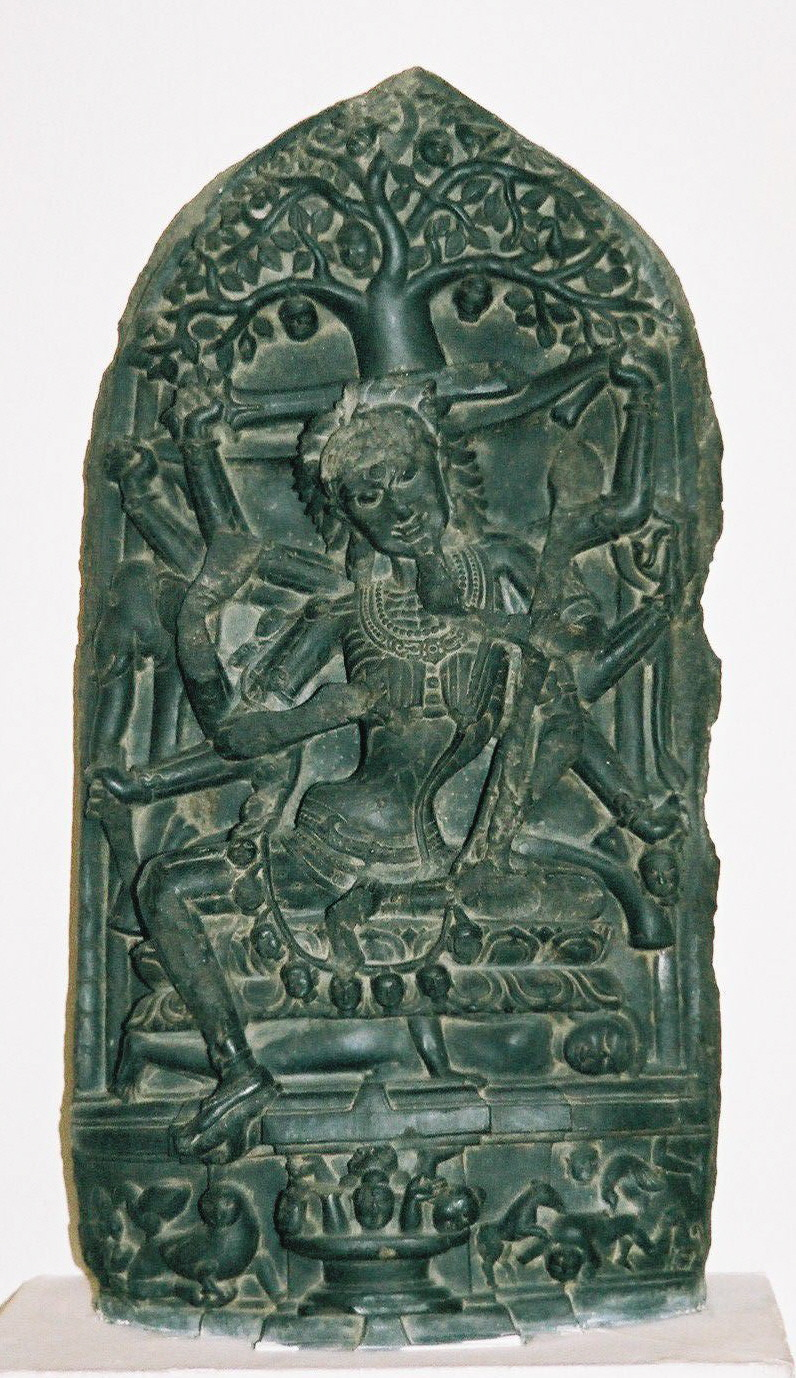
Chamunda, 11th-12th century, National Museum, Delhi. The ten-armed Chamunda is seated on a corpse, wearing a necklace of severed heads.

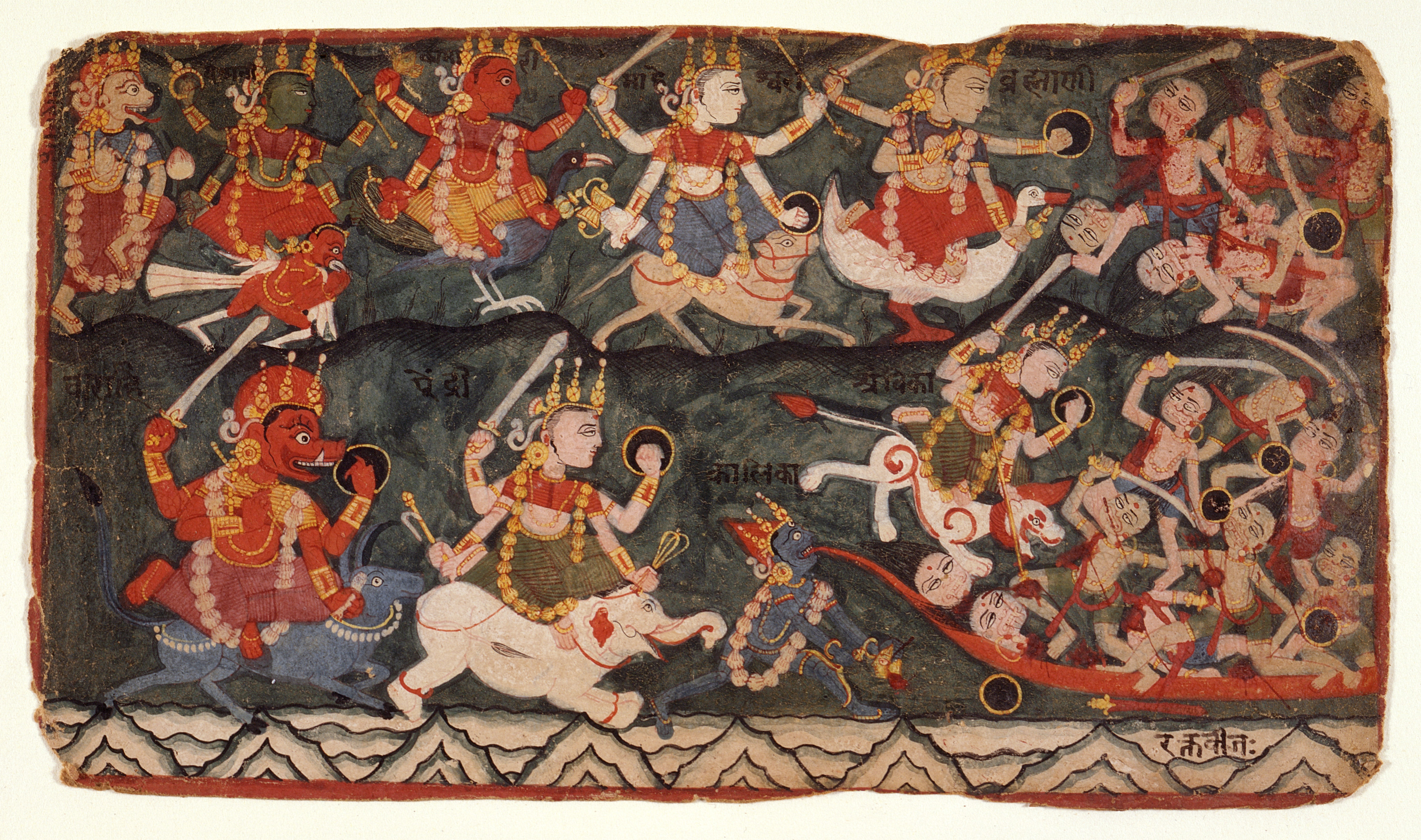
The Goddess Ambika (here identified with: Durga or Chandi) leading the Eight Matrikas in Battle Against the Demon Raktabīja, Folio from a Devi Mahatmya - (top row, from the left) Narasimhi, Vaishnavi, Kumari, Maheshvari, Brahmi. (bottom row, from left) Varahi, Aindri and Ambika. Chamunda drinking the blood of demons (on right) arising from Raktabīja's blood

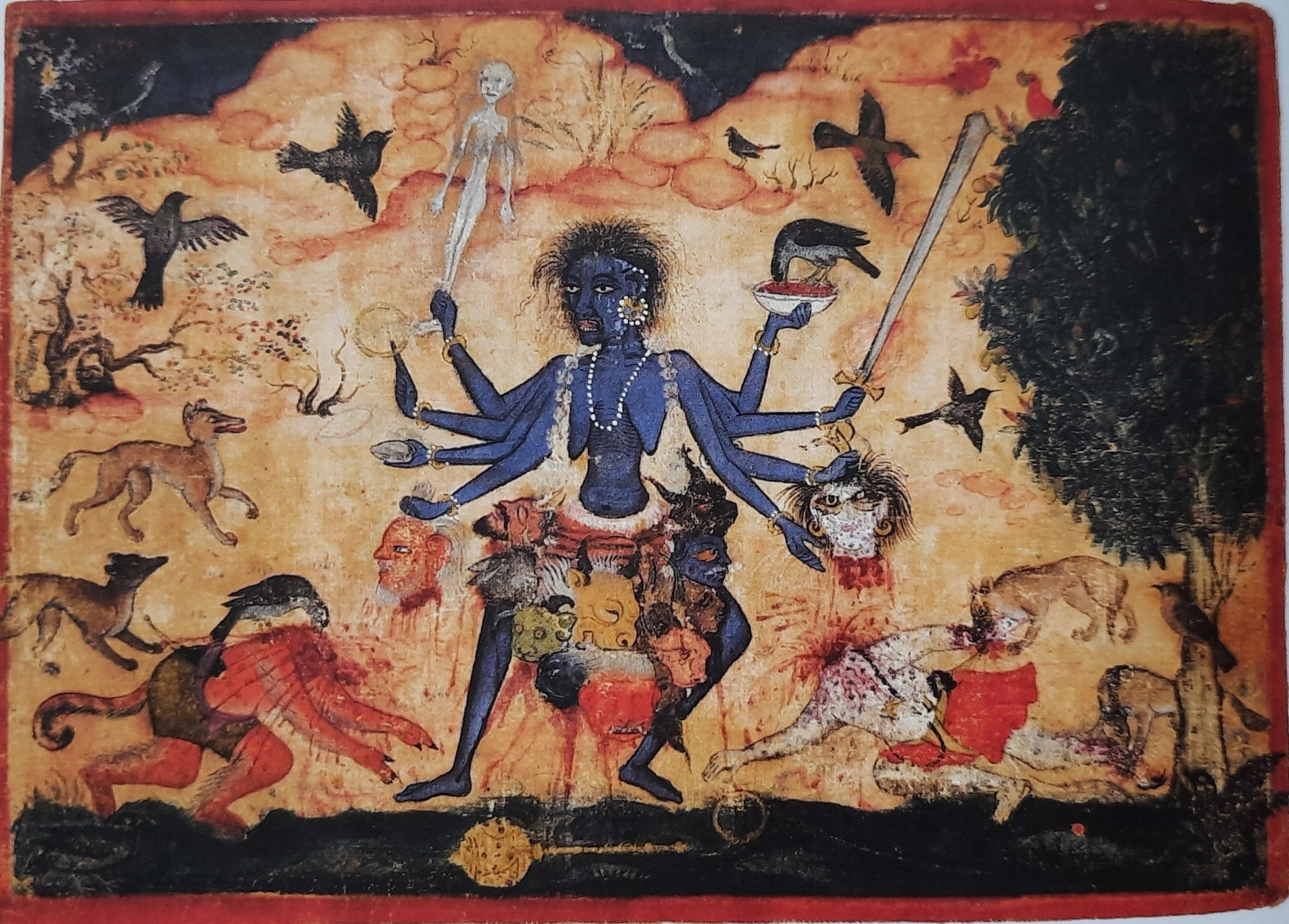
The Great Goddess in Her Chamunda Form. Mughal miniature, possibly from a scroll of the Devi Mahatmya, c. 1565-1575. Government Museum and Art Gallery, Chandigarh

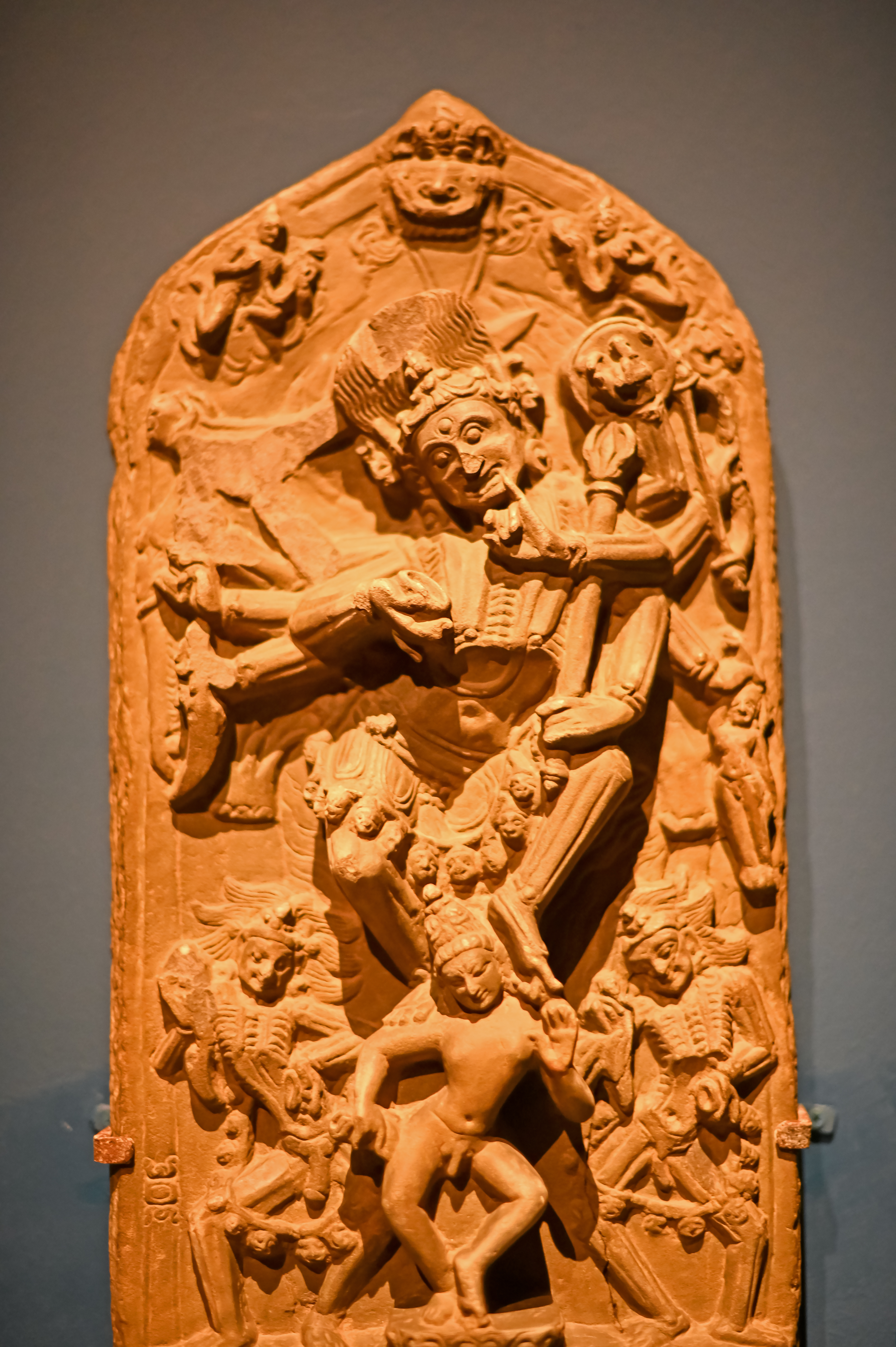
Chamunda sculpture from Rajshahi at Asian Civilisations Museum, schist, 11th century CE. The goddess is standing on a young boy and two kankala (skeletal) figures.

According to Devi Mahatmya, Chamunda emerged from middle of eyebrows of goddess Kaushiki, a goddess created from the "sheath" of Durga and was assigned the task of eliminating the demons Chanda and Munda, servants of demon kings Shumbha-Nisumbha. She fought a fierce battle with the demons, ultimately killing them.

According to a later episode of the Devi Mahatmya, Durga created Matrikas from herself and with their help slaughtered the demon army of Shumbha-Nishumbha. In this version, Kali is described as a Matrika who sucked all the blood of the demon Raktabīja, from whose blood drop rose another demon. Kali is given the epithet Chamunda in the text. Thus, the Devi Mahatmya identifies Chamunda with Kali.

In the Varaha Purana, the story of Raktabija is retold, but here each of Matrikas appears from the body of another Matrika. Chamunda appears from the foot of the lion-headed goddess Narasimhi. Here, Chamunda is considered a representation of the vice of tale-telling (pasunya). The Varaha Purana text mentions two separate goddesses Chamunda and Kali, unlike Devi Mahatmya.

According to another legend, Chamunda appeared from the frown of the benign goddess Parvati to kill demons Chanda and Munda. Here, Chamunda is viewed as a form of Parvati.

The Matsya Purana tells a different story of Chamunda's origins. She with other matrikas was created by Shiva to help him kill the demon Andhakasura, who has an ability - like Raktabīja - to generate from his dripping blood. Chamunda with the other matrikas drinks the blood of the demon ultimately helping Shiva kill him. Ratnākara, in his text Haravijaya, also describes this feat of Chamunda, but solely credits Chamunda, not the other matrikas for sipping the blood of Andhaka. Having drunk the blood, Chamunda's complexion changed to blood-red. The text further says that Chamunda dances destruction, playing a musical instrument whose shaft is Mount Meru, the string is the cosmic snake Shesha and the gourd is the crescent moon. She plays the instrument during the deluge that drowns the world.

== Association with Matrikas ==
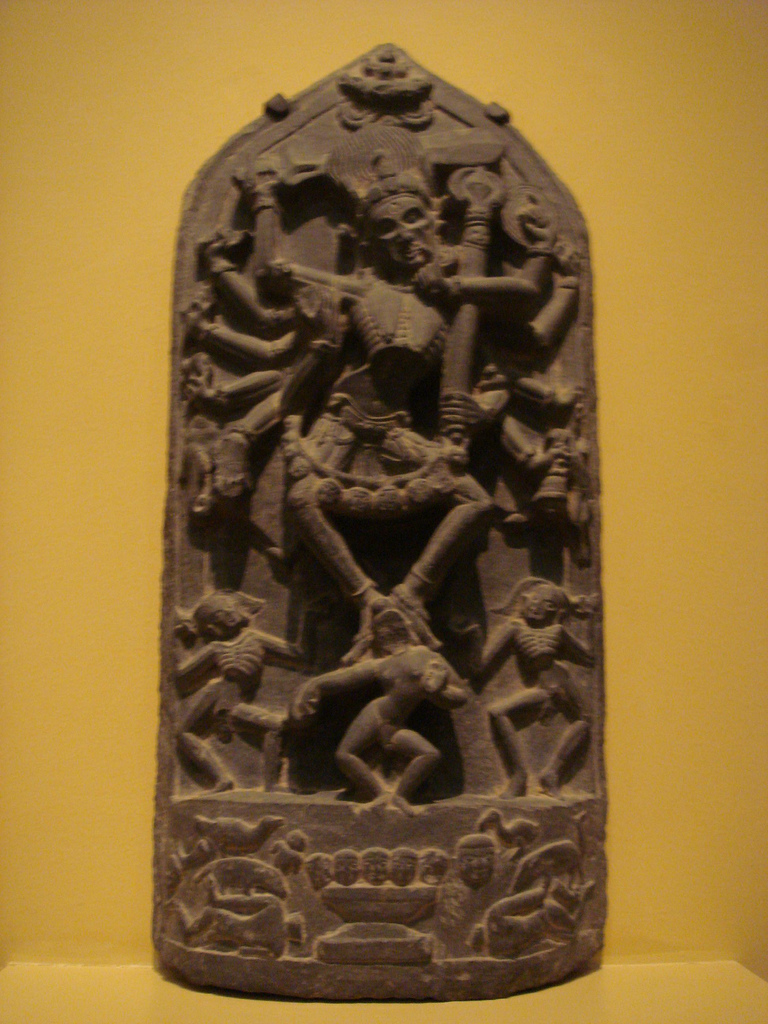
Chamunda, LACMA, Bengal, 11th century AD India.

Chamunda is one of the saptamatrikas or Seven Mothers. The Matrikas are fearsome mother goddesses, abductors and eaters of children; that is, they were emblematic of childhood pestilence, fever, starvation, and disease. They were propitiated to avoid those ills, that carried off so many children before they reached adulthood. Chamunda is included in the Saptamatrika (seven Matrikas or mothers) lists in the Hindu texts like the Mahabharata (Chapter 'Vana-parva'), the Devi Purana and the Vishnudharmottara Purana. She is often depicted in the Saptamatrika group in sculptures, examples of which are Ellora and Elephanta caves. Though she is always portrayed last (rightmost) in the group, she is sometimes referred to as the leader of the group. While other Matrikas are considered as Shaktis (powers) of male divinities and resemble them in their appearance, Chamunda is the only Matrika who is a Shakti of the great Goddess Devi rather than a male god. She is also the only Matrika who enjoys independent worship of her own; all other Matrikas are always worshipped together.

The Devi Purana describes a pentad of Matrikas who help Ganesha to kill demons. Further, sage Mandavya is described as worshipping the Māṭrpaňcaka (the five mothers), Chamunda being one of them. The mothers are described as established by the creator god Brahma for saving King Harishchandra from calamities. Apart from the usual meaning of Chamunda as the slayer of demons Chanda and Munda, the Devi Purana gives a different explanation: Chanda means terrible while Munda stands for Brahma's head or lord or husband.

In the Vishnudharmottara Purana - where the Matrikas are compared to vices - Chamunda is considered a manifestation of depravity. Every matrika is considered the guardian of a direction. Chamunda is assigned the direction of south-west.

Chamunda, being a Matrika, is considered one of the chief Yoginis, who are considered to be daughters or manifestations of the Matrikas. In the context of a group of sixty-four yoginis, Chamunda is believed to have created seven other yoginis, together forming a group of eight. In the context of eighty-one yoginis, Chamunda heads a group of nine yoginis.

== Worship ==
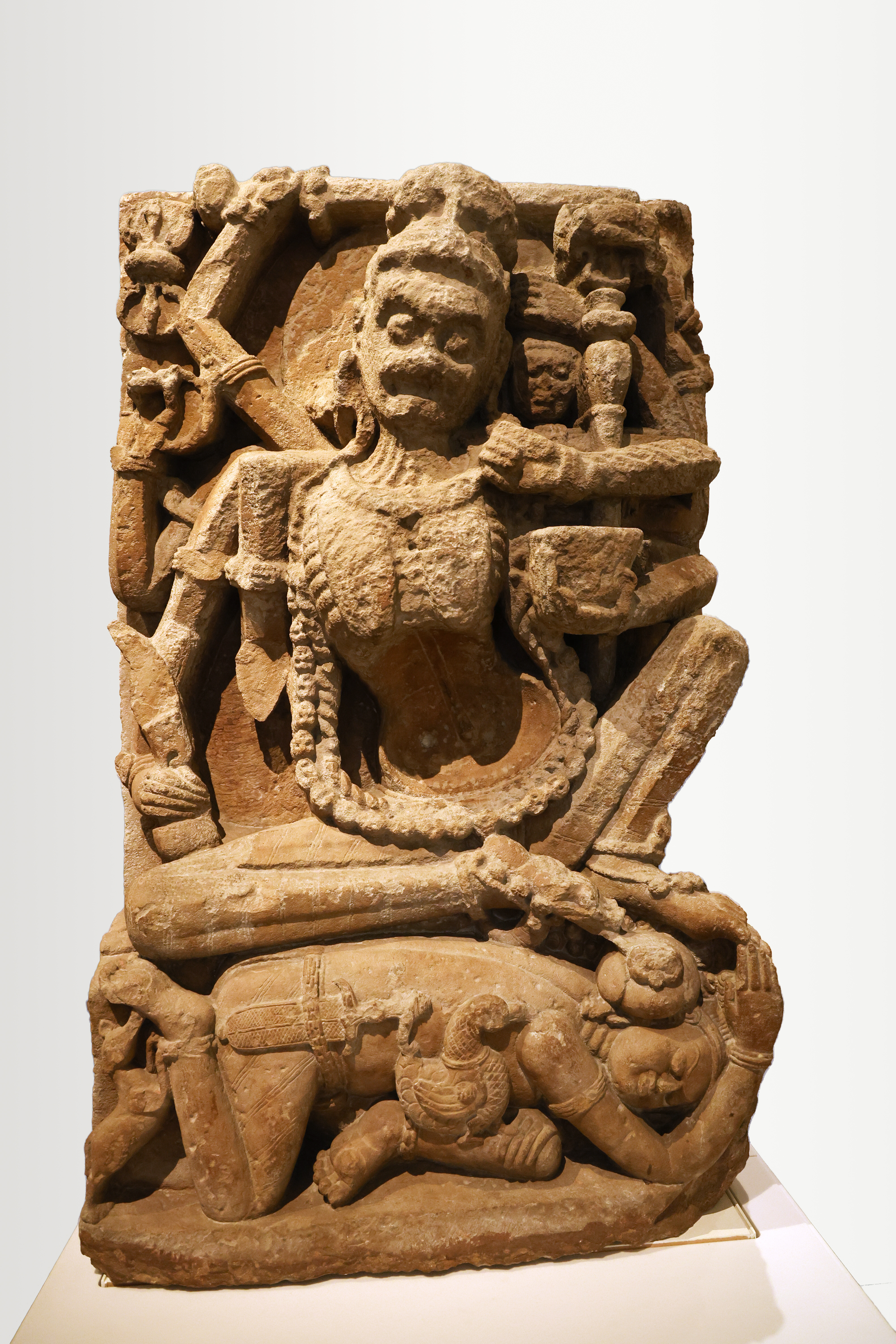
9th century statue of goddess Chamunda at the British Museum.

A South Indian inscription describes ritual sacrifices of sheep to Chamunda. In Bhavabhuti's eighth-century Sanskrit play, Malatimadhva describes a devotee of the goddess trying to sacrifice the heroine to Chamunda's temple, near a cremation ground, where the goddess temple is. A stone inscription at Gangadhar, Rajasthan, deals with the construction of a shrine to Chamunda and the other Matrikas, "who are attended by Dakinis" (female demons) and rituals of daily Tantric worship (Tantrobhuta) like the ritual of Bali (offering of grain). Chamunda puja is a part of Sandhi Puja, a key ritual during Durga Puja. During Sandhi Puja, which takes place between the final 24 minutes of Ashtami and the first 24 minutes of Nabami, Goddess Durga is worshipped in her Chamunda form.

=== Temples ===
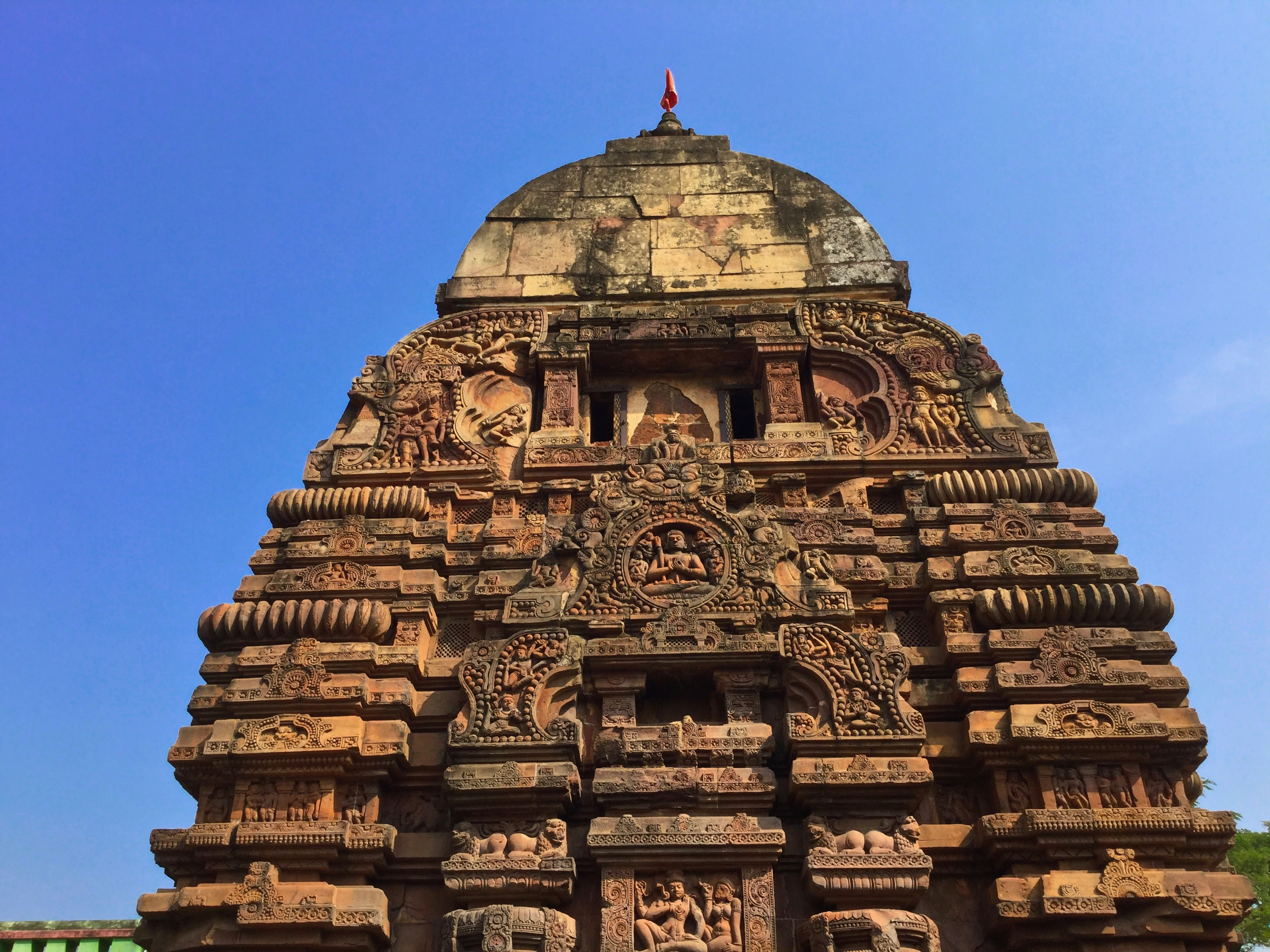
8th-century Baitala Deula in Bhubaneswar, Odisha dedicated to Chamunda

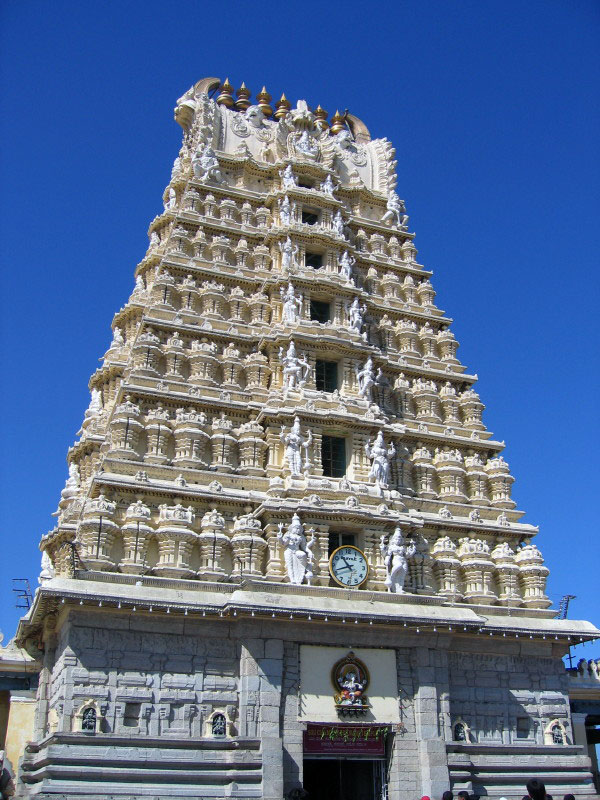
Chamundeshwari Temple in Mysuru, Karnataka

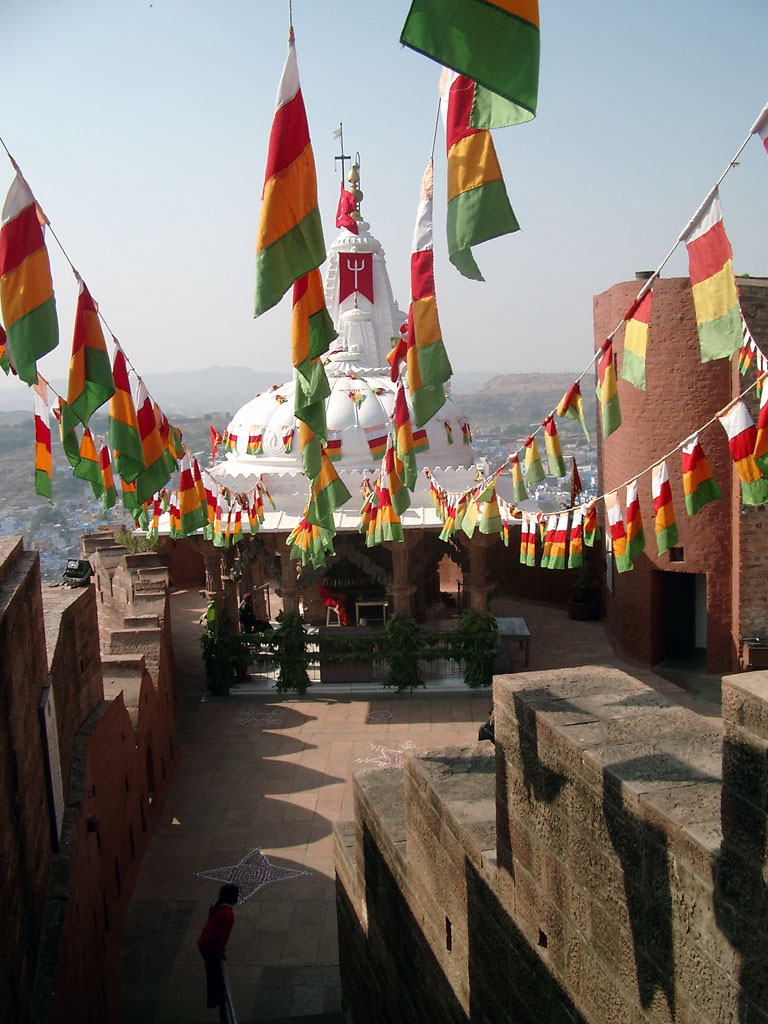
Jodhpur temple

- In the Kangra district of Himachal Pradesh, around 10 kilometres (6.2 mi) west of Palampur, is the renowned Chamunda Devi Temple which depicts scenes from the Devi Mahatmya, the Ramayana and the Mahabharata. The goddess's image is flanked by the images of Hanuman and Bhairava. Another temple, Chamunda Nandikeshwar Dham, also found in Kangra, is dedicated to Shiva and Chamunda. According to a legend, Chamunda was enshrined as chief deity "Rudra Chamunda", in the battle between the demon Jalandhara and Shiva.
- In Gujarat, major Chamunda shrines are on the hills of Chotila, Parnera and Uncha Kotda.
- There are multiple Chamunda temples in Odisha. The 8th-century Baitala Deula is the most prominent of them, also one of the earliest temples in Bhubaneswar. The Mohini temple and Chitrakarini temple in Bhubaneswar are also dedicated to Chamunda. Kichakeshwari Temple, near Baripada; and Charchika Temple, near Banki, enshrine forms of Chamunda.
- Another temple is Chamundeshwari Temple on Chamundi Hill, Mysore. Here, the goddess is identified with Durga, who killed the buffalo demon, Mahishasura. Chamundeshwari or Durga, the fierce form of Shakti, a tutelary deity held in reverence for centuries by the Maharaja of Mysore.
- The Chamunda Mataji temple in Mehrangarh Fort, Jodhpur, was established in 1460 after the idol of the goddess Chamunda — the Kuladevi and iṣṭa-devatā (tutelary deity) of the Parihar rulers — was moved from the old capital of Mandore by the then-ruler Jodha of Mandore. The goddess is still worshiped by the royal family of Jodhpur and other citizens of the city. The temple witnesses festivities in Dussehra: the festival of the goddess.
- Another temple, Sri Chamundeshwari Kshetram is near Jogipet, in Medak District in Telangana State.
- Sree Shakthan Kulangara temple is one of the Chamundeshwari temples. It is located in Koyilandy, Kozhikode District in Kerala.
- One Chamunda Mata temple is situated in Dewas, Madhya Pradesh, It is situated on a hilltop named Tekri above 300 feet. Chamunda Mata in Dewas is also called Choti Mata (the younger sister of Tulja Mata, situated at the same hilltop).

=== In Buddhism ===
In Vajrayana Buddhism, Chamunda is associated with Palden Lhamo. She is seen as a wrathful form of Kali and is a consort of Mahakala and protectress of the Dalai Lama and Panchen Lama of the Gelug school.

=== In Jainism ===
Early Jains were dismissive of Chamunda, the goddess who demanded blood sacrifice - which is against the primary principle of Ahimsa of Jainism. Some Jain legends portray Chamunda as a goddess defeated by Jain monks like Jinadatta and Jinaprabhasuri. However, the most popular legend is of Ratnaprabhasuri.

Another Jain legend tells the story of the conversion of Chamunda into a Jain goddess. According to this story, Chamunda sculpted the Mahavir image for the temple in Osian and was happy with the conversion of Hindus to Jainism and the subsequent renaming of their clan to Oswal. At the time of Navaratri, a festival that celebrates the Hindu Divine Mother, Chamunda expected animal sacrifices from Jains. The Jains, however, were unable to meet her demand. Jain monk Ratnaprabhasuri intervened and preached to her, and as a result, Chamunda accepted vegetarian offerings, forgoing her demand for meat and liquor. Ratnaprabhasuri further named her Sacciya, one who had told the truth, as Chamunda had told him the truth that a rainy season stay in Osian was beneficial for him. She also became the protective goddess of the temple and remained the clan goddess of the Osvals. The Sachiya Mata Temple in Osian was built in her honour by Jains. Some Jain scriptures warn of dire consequences of worship of Chamunda by the Hindu rites and rituals. Many Kshatriyas and even the Jain community worship her as her Kuladevi and samyaktvi demi-goddess as per Jain rituals.

== See also ==
- Mahakali
- Maheshvari
- Tridevi
