= Banky =

Banky or Bánky is both a given name and a surname. Notable people with the name include:

- Vilma Bánky (1901–1991), Hungarian-born American silent film star
- Viktor Bánky (1899–1967), Hungarian film editor and director

Fictional characters:

- Banky Edwards, a fictional character in several movies by director Kevin Smith

== See also ==
- Banky Brook, a tributary of the River Trent in Staffordshire, England
- Ernest Bankey (1920–2009), American World War II flying ace
- Banki (disambiguation)
