= Devi Ranjan Tripathy =

Indian politician

- ଦେବୀ ରଞ୍ଜନ ତ୍ରିପାଠୀ
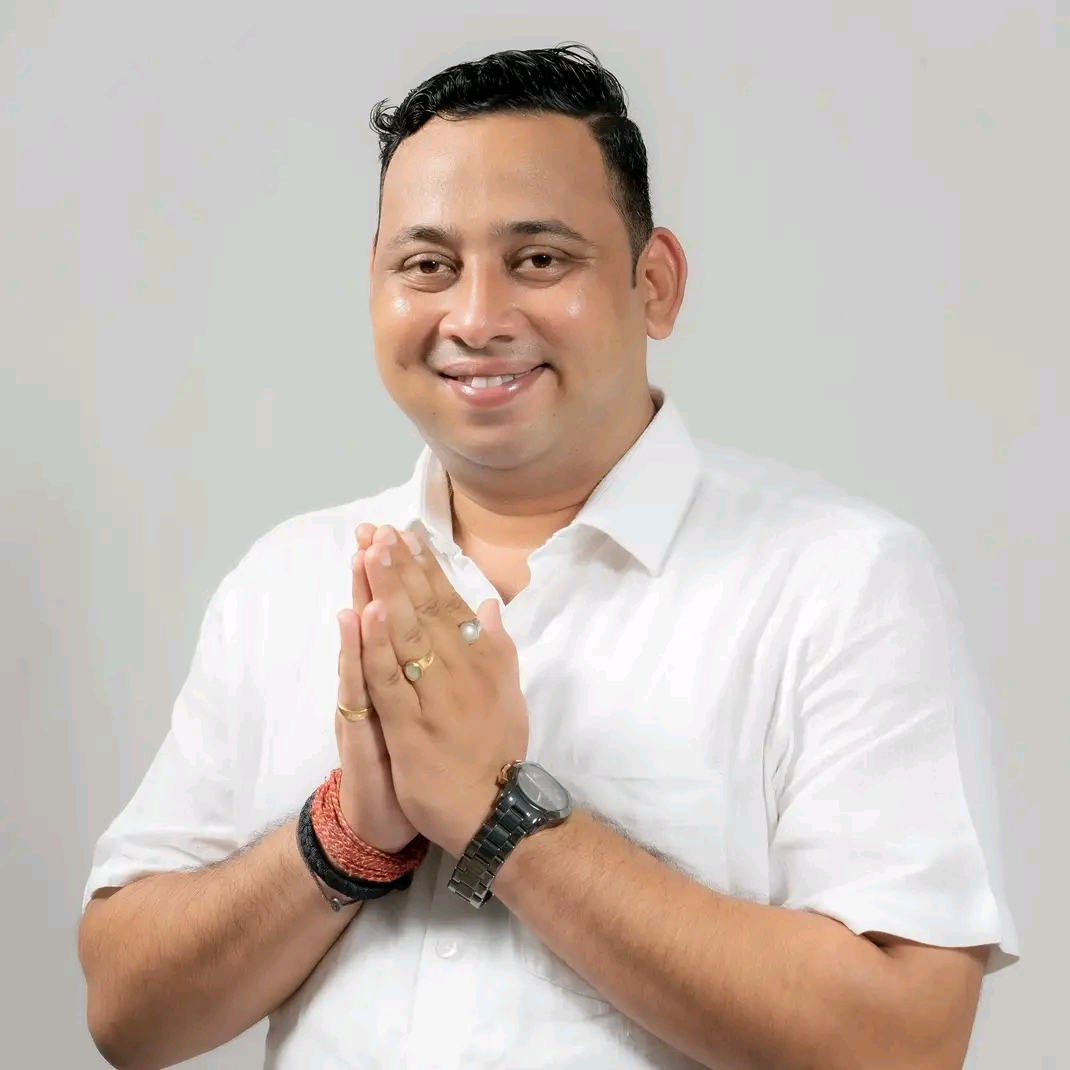

Member of the Odisha Legislative Assembly
- In office 23 May 2019 – Incumbent
- Preceded by: Pravat Tripathy
- Constituency: Banki Assembly constituency

Personal details
- Born: December 24, 1987 (age 38) Odisha, India
- Party: Biju Janata Dal
- Parent: Pravat Tripathy (father)
- Education: B.Com, MBA
- Occupation: Politician

Devi Ranjan Tripathy (born 24 December 1987) is an Indian politician from the state of Odisha and a former member of the Biju Janata Dal (BJD). He has represented the Banki Assembly constituency in the Odisha Legislative Assembly since 2019. He was elected to the Assembly in the 2019 Odisha Legislative Assembly election and was re-elected in the 2024 Odisha Legislative Assembly election. He is the son of Pravat Tripathy who was the senior leader of Biju Janata Dal and 4 times MLA from Banki (Vidhan Sabha constituency). Devi Ranjan Tripathy previously served as the State President of the Biju Chhatra Janata Dal (BCJD), the student wing of the Biju Janata Dal.

== Early life and education ==
Devi Ranjan Tripathy was born on 24 December 1987 in Odisha. He completed a Bachelor of Commerce (B.Com) from Christ College, Cuttack, affiliated with Utkal University, in 2011. He later obtained a Master of Business Administration (MBA) from HP Institute of Higher Education, Bhubaneswar, affiliated with Fakir Mohan University, in 2013.

== Political career ==
Tripathy joined the Biju Janata Dal (BJD) and became active in Odisha politics. He contested the 2019 Odisha Legislative Assembly election from the Banki Assembly constituency as the BJD candidate.

In the 2019 Assembly election, Tripathy was elected to the Odisha Legislative Assembly after defeating Indian National Congress candidate Debasis Patnaik by a margin of 24,118 votes. He secured 74,599 votes, while Patnaik received 50,481 votes.

He successfully retained the Banki seat in the 2024 Odisha Legislative Assembly election. Contesting again as the Biju Janata Dal candidate, he defeated Bharatiya Janata Party candidate Tusara Kanta Chakrabarty by 17,026 votes. Tripathy received 69,214 votes, while Chakrabarty secured 52,188 votes.

Following his re-election in 2024, Tripathy continued as the Member of the Odisha Legislative Assembly representing the Banki constituency.

== Electoral performance ==
Election	Constituency	Party	Votes	Opponent	Opponent's party	Opponent's votes	Margin	Result
2019	Banki	Biju Janata Dal	74,599	Debasis Patnaik	Indian National Congress	50,481	24,118	Won
2024	Banki	Biju Janata Dal	69,214	Tusara Kanta Chakrabarty	Bharatiya Janata Party	52,188	17,026	Won

== See also ==
- Odisha Legislative Assembly
- Banki Assembly constituency
- Biju Janata Dal
