= Jessica G. L. Clarke =

American judge (born 1983)

Jessica Clarke
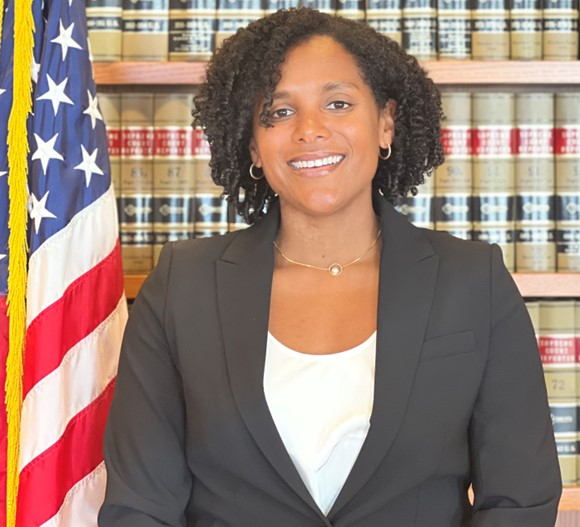

Judge of the United States District Court for the Southern District of New York
- Incumbent
- Assumed office April 20, 2023
- Appointed by: Joe Biden
- Preceded by: Colleen McMahon

Personal details
- Born: Jessica Gloria Lynn Clarke; 1983 (age 42–43) Akron, Ohio, U.S.
- Education: Northwestern University (BA); Ohio State University (JD)

Jessica Gloria Lynn Clarke (born 1983) is an American lawyer from New York who serves as a United States district judge of the United States District Court for the Southern District of New York.

== Education ==
Clarke received her Bachelor of Arts from Northwestern University in 2005 and her Juris Doctor, cum laude, from the Ohio State University Moritz College of Law in 2008.

== Career ==
Clarke began her law career as a law clerk for Judge Solomon Oliver Jr. of the United States District Court for the Northern District of Ohio from 2008 to 2010. From 2010 to 2016, she served as a trial attorney in the Housing & Civil Enforcement Section of the Civil Rights Division of the United States Department of Justice. She then worked at the boutique law firm Emery Celli Brinckerhoff Abady Ward & Maazel LLP, first as an associate from 2016 to 2018 and then as of counsel from 2018 to 2019. From 2019 to 2023, she served as chief of the Civil Rights Bureau at the New York State Office of Attorney General under Letitia James, overseeing the bureau's work on violations of civil rights law in New York.

=== Federal judicial service ===
On December 15, 2021, President Joe Biden nominated Clarke to serve as a United States district judge of the United States District Court for the Southern District of New York to a seat vacated by Judge Colleen McMahon, who assumed senior status on April 21, 2021. On January 12, 2022, a hearing on her nomination was held before the Senate Judiciary Committee. During her hearing, Republican senators questioned her over her role in an investigation related to the New York City police response to George Floyd protests. James recommended that New York City decriminalize minor infractions to reduce "negative contact with the police, particularly in communities of color." On February 10, 2022, the committee failed to report her nomination by an 11–11 vote. On June 23, 2022, the United States Senate discharged the committee from further consideration of her nomination by a 50–49 vote.

On January 3, 2023, her nomination was returned to the President under Rule XXXI, Paragraph 6 of the United States Senate; she was renominated later the same day. On February 9, 2023, her nomination was reported out of committee by an 11–10 vote. On March 16, 2023, the Senate invoked cloture on her nomination by a 49–45 vote. Later that day, her nomination was confirmed by a 48–43 vote. She received her judicial commission on April 20, 2023.

== See also ==
- List of African-American federal judges
- List of African-American jurists
- Joe Biden judicial appointment controversies

Legal offices
Preceded by Colleen McMahon	Judge of the United States District Court for the Southern District of New York; 2023–present	Incumbent
