= Charchika Temple =

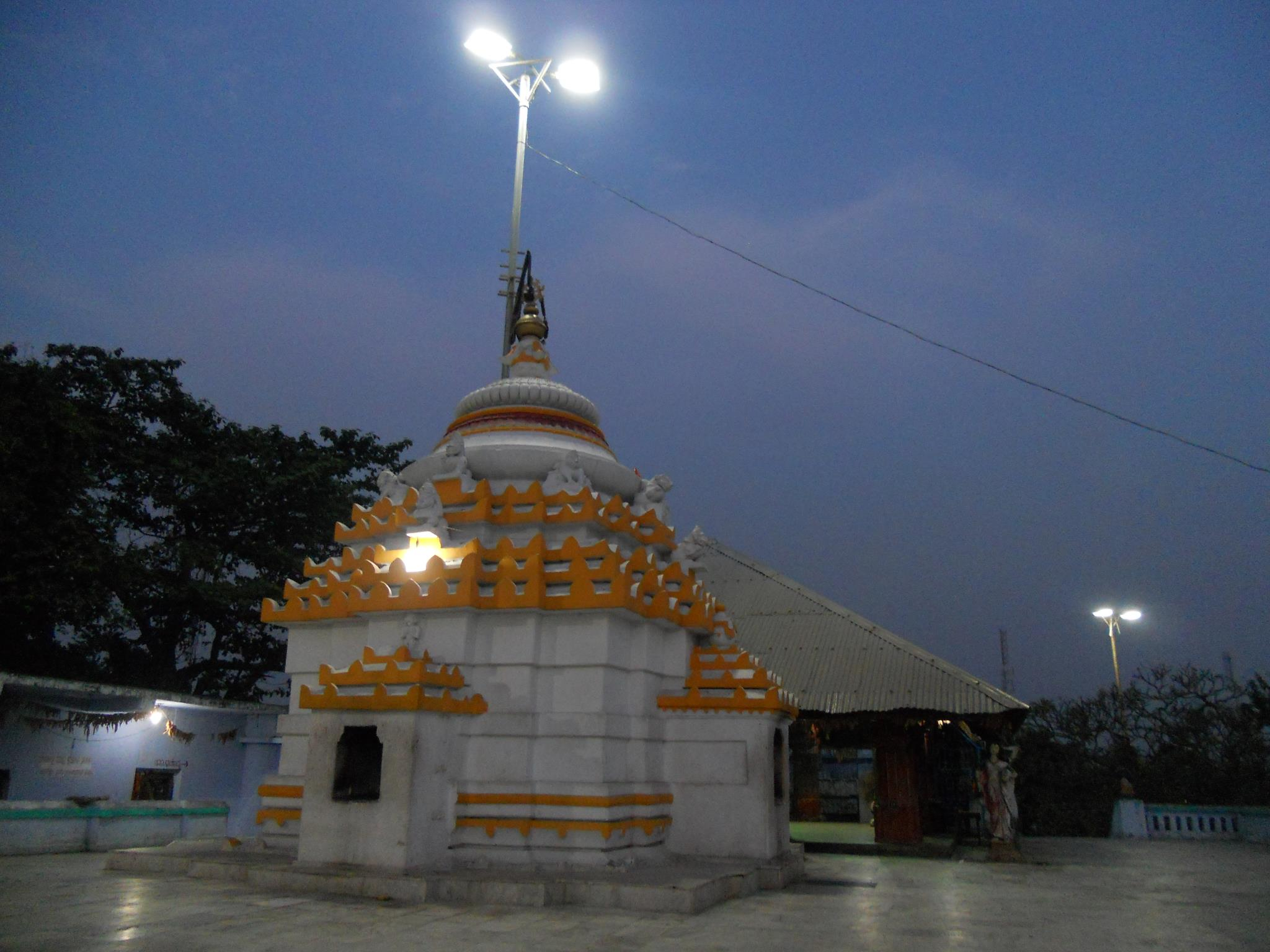

Religion
- Affiliation: Hinduism
- District: Cuttack
- Deity: Charchika (Chamunda)

Location
- Location: Banki
- State: Odisha
- Country: India
- Interactive map of Charchika Temple
- Coordinates: 20.377257°N 85.527682°E

Charchika Temple is one of the oldest Shakti places in Odisha, India. It is located in a town of Banki of Cuttack district in Odisha. The presiding deity is an eight-armed goddess Chamunda, locally known as Maa Charchika Devi. She is seated on a prostrate human body and wearing a garland of human skulls. She displays khadga, shula, katari and varadamudra in her four right hands whereas the four left hands represent severed head, blood-cup, ‘’damru’’ and leaving a finger of the remaining hand soaked in blood. This temple is situated on top of a small hillock Ruchika Parvata on the banks of the Renuka river in the small town of Banki in Cuttack district of Odisha.

== History ==
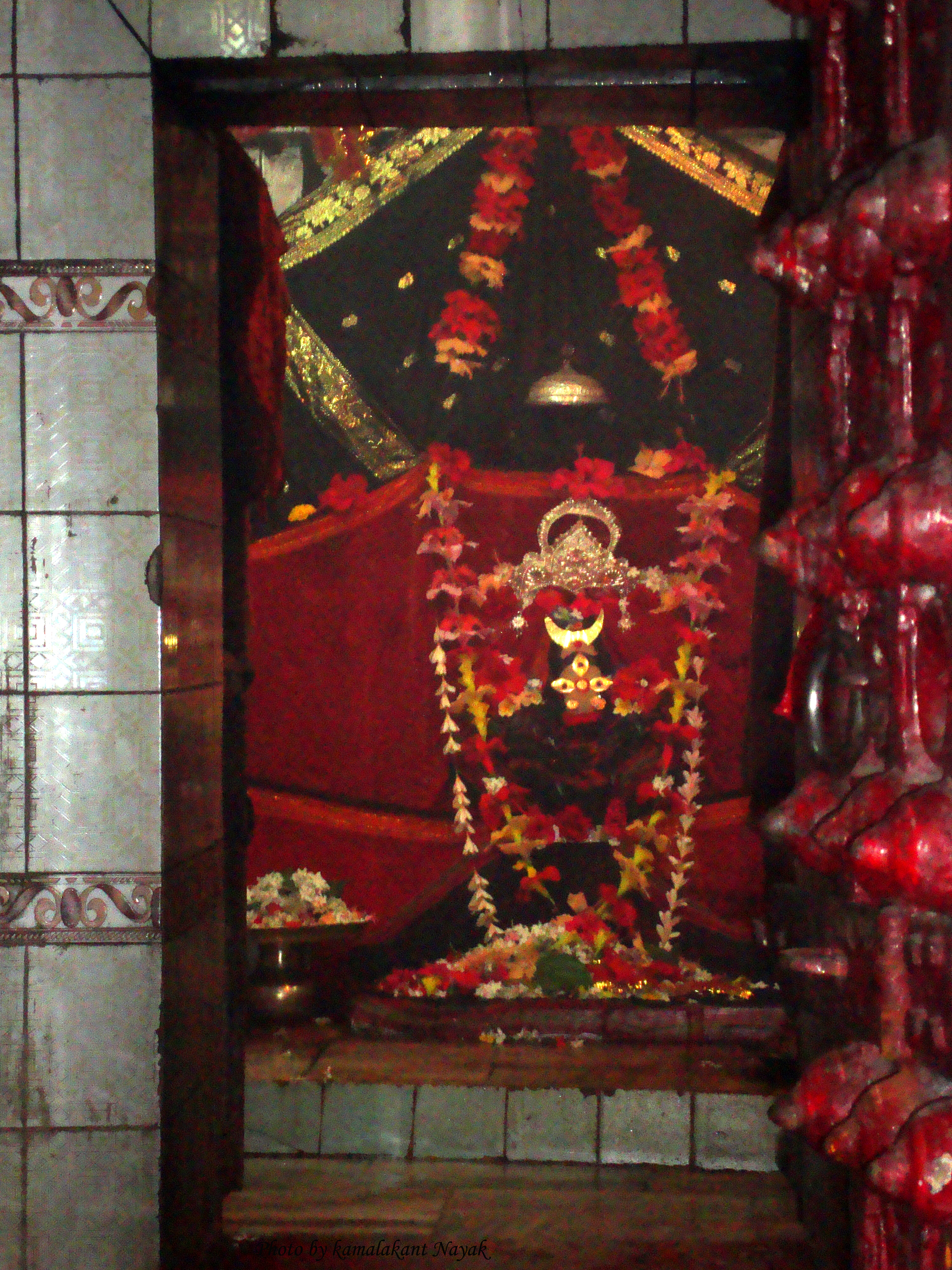
Charchika devi, the eight armed goddess

The present temple was reconstructed in the 19th century. But the remarkable point is the enshrining deity Maa Charchika on iconographical point of view can be assigned to the 9th – 10th centuries A.D. i.e. Bhaumakara rule in Odisha. It is believed that the Charchika idol was created by Parashurama. The temple has a pidha vimana, jagamohana and a wooden mandapa known as "sunyavahini mandapa" of impoverished Kalingan order. Stone is used for the construction of the temple and the entire surface is thickly lime plastered and white washed. The ceiling of the mandapa is made of wood whereas the pillars are in stone. The ceiling of the mandapa is profusely carved and painted. The wooden ceiling of the mandapa is relieved with episodes from Bhagavata Purana with intervening decoration of animals and birds like - elephant, duck, parrot, peacock, etc.; floral motifs, lotus medallions, scroll and jali works, animal hunting, horse rider, gaja-vidalas, makaramukha, mithuna and maithuna images. Besides, the parsvadevata niches enshrine four-armed Chamunda, four-armed Mahisasuramardini Durga and an eight-armed Chamunda on the north, west and southern side respectively.

The Renuka River was recreated by the flood of 1982. It is believed that one devotee who worshiped Maa Charchika, after pleasing her, took away all ornaments of Maa Charchika and build a house where this river is currently flowing. As Maa Charchika was furious with this, she created this River Renuka to punish him and to destroy his home. This temple is situated in the heart of Banki. The temple is most frequently visited at the time of Durga Puja, a Hindu festival in the month of October, when thousands of devotees come to be blessed. Kumar Purnima, a Hindu festival celebrated 5 days after Dusshera, is very famous here.

One more Temple of Maa Charchika is at Mathura, near the Yamuna river.

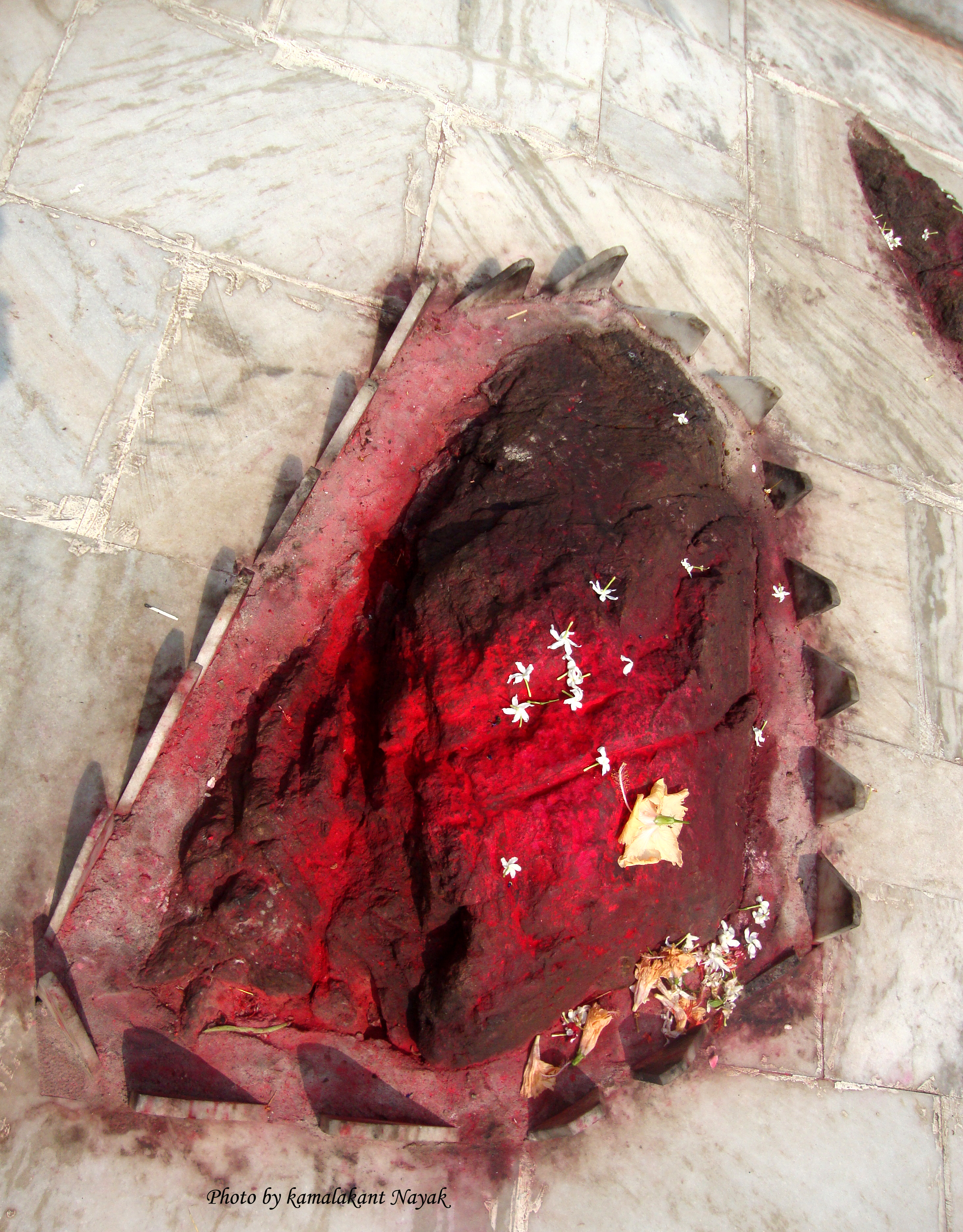

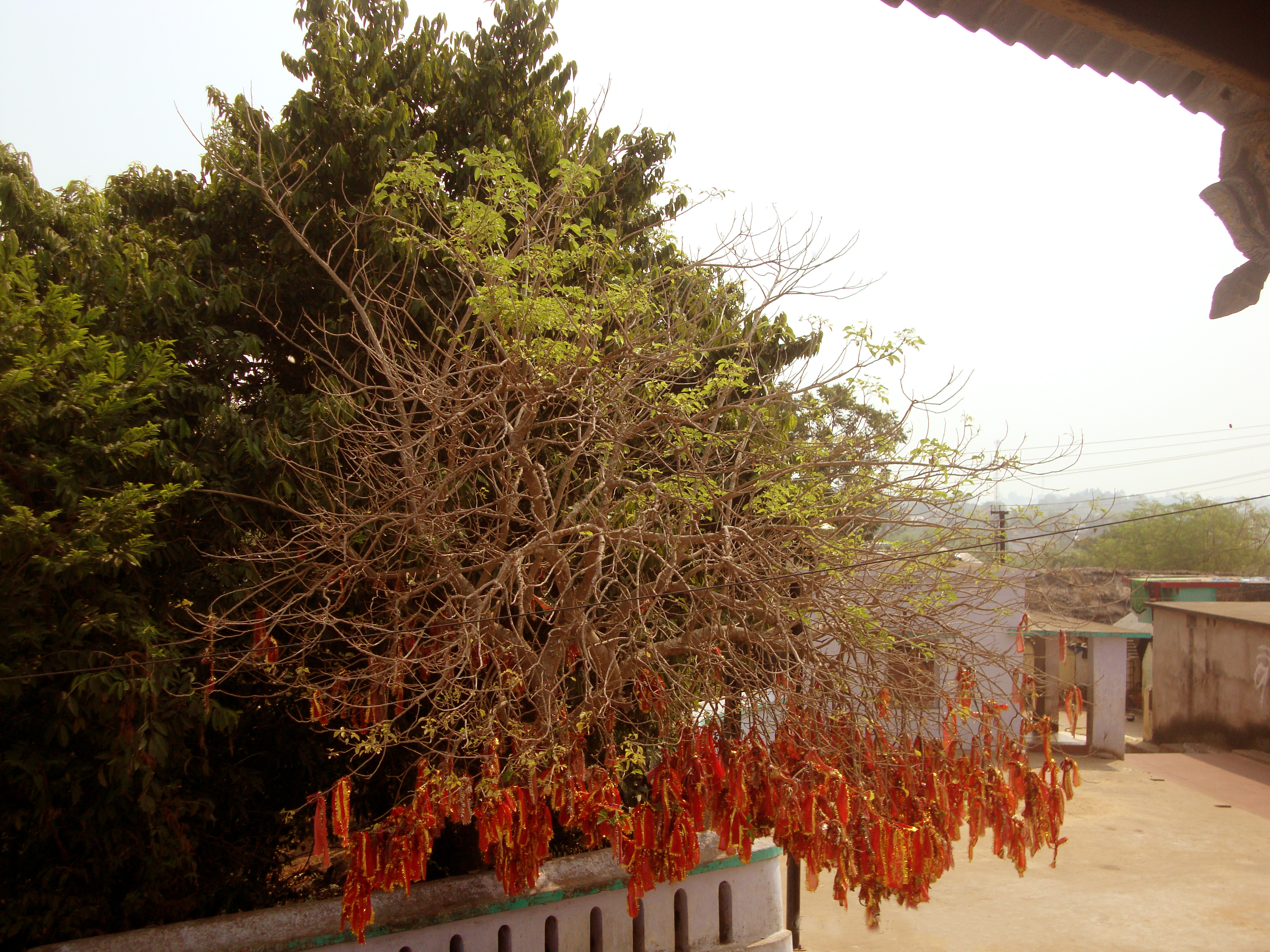
