= Colleen McMahon =

American judge (born 1951)

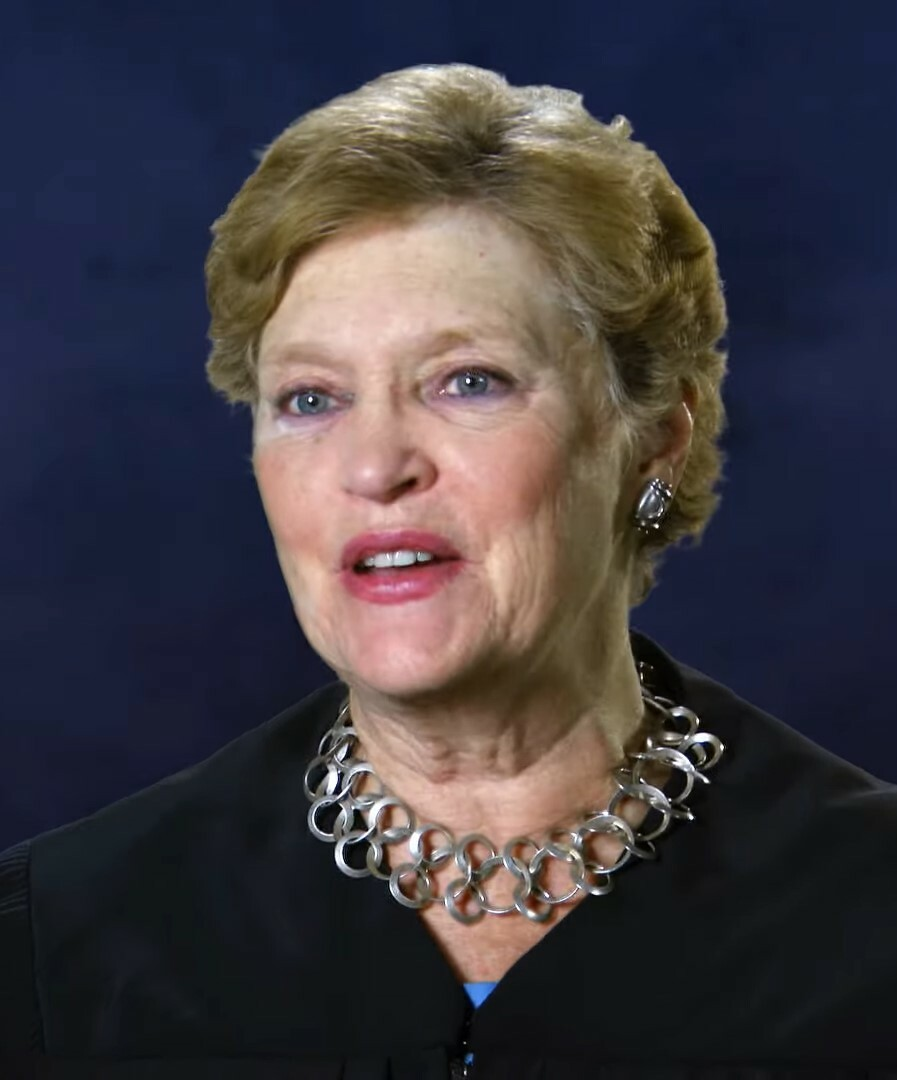
- McMahon in 2021

Senior Judge of the United States District Court for the Southern District of New York
- Incumbent
- Assumed office April 10, 2021

Chief Judge of the United States District Court for the Southern District of New York
- In office June 1, 2016 – April 10, 2021
- Preceded by: Loretta A. Preska
- Succeeded by: Laura Taylor Swain

Judge of the United States District Court for the Southern District of New York
- In office October 22, 1998 – April 10, 2021
- Appointed by: Bill Clinton
- Preceded by: John F. Keenan
- Succeeded by: Jessica G. L. Clarke

Personal details
- Born: July 18, 1951 (age 75) Columbus, Ohio, U.S.
- Education: Ohio State University (BA); Harvard University (JD)

Colleen McMahon (born July 18, 1951) is a senior United States district judge of the United States District Court for the Southern District of New York.

== Education and career ==
Born in Columbus, Ohio, McMahon received a Bachelor of Arts degree from Ohio State University in 1973 and a Juris Doctor from Harvard Law School in 1976. She was in private practice in New York City from 1976 to 1995, except for a period from 1979 to 1980 when she was a speechwriter and special assistant to Donald McHenry, the United States Permanent Representative to the United Nations. From 1995 to 1998, she was a judge of the New York Court of Claims, New York Supreme Court.

== Federal judicial service ==
On May 21, 1998, President Bill Clinton nominated McMahon to a seat on the United States District Court for the Southern District of New York vacated by John F. Keenan. McMahon was confirmed by the United States Senate on October 21 and received her commission on October 22. She was the Chief Judge from June 1, 2016, to April 10, 2021. On April 1, 2021, McMahon announced her intention to assume senior status on April 10.

== Notable cases ==
Among the cases over which McMahon has presided is a defamation case brought by Drug Enforcement Administration agents against the makers of the 2007 film American Gangster, which was alleged to have portrayed such agents as corrupt.

In 2011, she was the judge in the case of the "Newburgh four", who were accused of planning a 2009 bombing in the Bronx, New York. The suspects were Onta Williams, Laguerre, David Williams, and James Cromitie. The case involved FBI agent Robert Fuller as the handler of informant Shahed Hussain. At sentencing, McMahon pointed out that the FBI played a key role in creating the crimes of which the defendants were convicted, saying it "created acts of terrorism out of his [Cromitie's] fantasies of bravado and bigotry, and then made those fantasies come true." She added: "Only the government could have made a terrorist out of Mr. Cromitie, whose buffoonery is positively Shakespearean in scope." In July 2023, McMahon ordered the release of three of the four defendants, ruling that the FBI had employed unscrupulous methods to manipulate them into committing illegal acts, including using Hussain, whom McMahon called "unsavory".

In 2019, McMahon rejected a bid for compassionate early release by convicted fraudster Samuel Israel III, agreeing he had serious health problems but also saying that early release would "make a mockery of the sentencing statue" given Israel's serious crimes and privileged background.

In December 2021, McMahon ruled that a bankruptcy judge lacked the authority to give the Sackler family immunity in civil liability cases related to their involvement in Purdue Pharma.

In February 2023, McMahon criticized the New York City Department of Corrections for failing to promptly provide information on the identities of staffers who may have been involved in activities described in a class action lawsuit over substandard conditions and illegal detentions at Rikers Island. "There is no agency that ... has been a more troublesome litigant in terms of, and you will excuse my language, 'Fuck you, judge, I'll do what I want' in that period than DOC", she said in open court.

In March 2026, McMahon ruled against Lynne Freeman and found that young adult romantasy author Tracy Wolff had not committed plagiarism with her Crave book series. McMahon wrote, "hot, sexy, dangerous boys—central to virtually all young adult romance novels—cannot be copyrighted."

In May 2026, McMahon granted summary judgment to plaintiffs in consolidated challenges to the Trump administration's cancellation of National Endowment for the Humanities grants. The case concerned the largest mass termination of previously awarded grants in the history of the NEH, affecting more than 1,400 grants and over $100 million in congressionally appropriated funds. McMahon held that the Department of Government Efficiency lacked statutory authority to identify, select, or direct the termination of NEH grants, and that the mass termination violated the First Amendment and the equal-protection component of the Fifth Amendment. The opinion emphasized separation-of-powers limits on executive action, reasoning that Congress had vested NEH grant-making authority in the NEH chairperson, not in DOGE, and that presidential executive orders could not give DOGE authority that Congress had not conferred. McMahon concluded that DOGE had displaced the statutory grant-making process in order to advance President Donald Trump's policy objectives, exceeding constitutional limits on executive power.

The ruling also addressed DOGE's use of artificial intelligence in the termination process. According to the decision, DOGE personnel used ChatGPT to screen grant descriptions for perceived connections to diversity, equity, and inclusion, and to generate rationales for terminating grants. McMahon rejected the government's argument that any viewpoint-based classification was attributable to ChatGPT rather than the government, writing that ChatGPT was the government's chosen instrument and that its use did not excuse unconstitutional conduct. McMahon permanently enjoined the government from enforcing or giving effect to the mass termination and required the termination notices to be rescinded. In addressing Tucker Act jurisdiction arguments, she limited the relief to equitable and constitutional relief, writing that the order did not require immediate payment of grant funds or adjudicate any contractual entitlement to money.

Legal offices
Preceded by John F. Keenan	Judge of the United States District Court for the Southern District of New York; 1998–2021	Succeeded by Jessica G. L. Clarke
Preceded by Loretta A. Preska	Chief Judge of the United States District Court for the Southern District of New York; 2016–2021	Succeeded by Laura Taylor Swain
