= Anshupa Lake =

Lake in Odisha, India

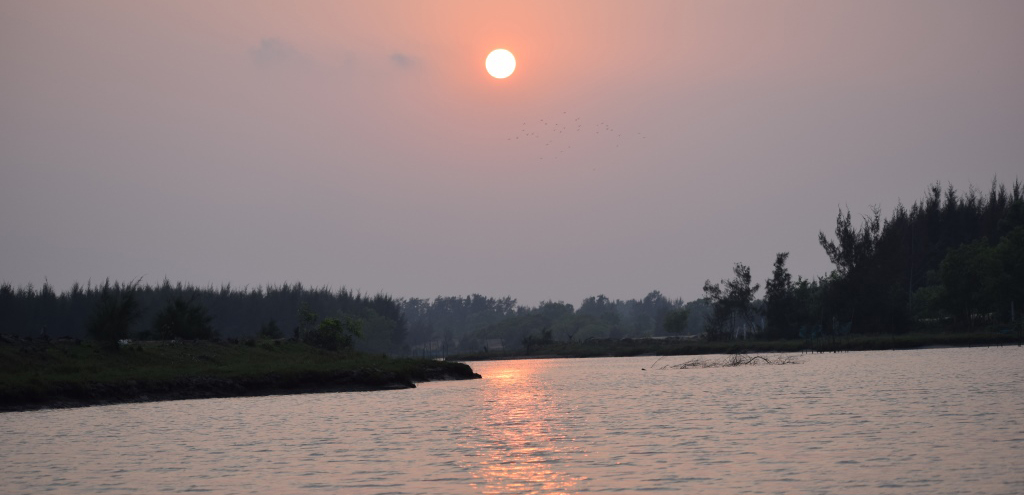
- Anshupa lake

- Location within Odisha
- Location: Banki, Cuttack, Odisha
- Coordinates: 20.4591°N 85.6037°E
- Type: Freshwater Lake
- Basin countries: India
- Max. length: 5 km (3.1 mi)
- Max. width: 1.6 km (0.99 mi)
- Surface area: 231 ha (570 acres)
- Surface elevation: Surrounded by Saranda Hills
- Settlements: Cuttack

Ramsar Wetland
- Official name: Ansupa Lake
- Designated: 12 October 2021
- Reference no.: 2487

Anshupa Lake is a 231-hectare (570-acre) horseshoe-shaped fresh water oxbow lake on the left bank of the Mahanadi river, opposite Banki in Cuttack district, Odisha, India. It is 40 km (25 mi) from the city of Cuttack. It is a fresh water lake situated amidst the Saranda Hills and enclosed by bamboo tree greenery and mango trees and acts as a shelter for the migratory birds in the wintry weather season. There are boating and fishing facilities. The lake has been designated as a protected Ramsar site since 2021.
