= Banki syndrome =

- Other names: Fusion of the lunate and cuneiform bones of the wrist, clinodactyly, clinometacarpy, brachymetacarpy and leptometacarpy (thin diaphysis)

Banki syndrome is a rare disorder in which two or more bones are fused. The symptoms may include: abnormality of the long bone of hand; short fingers or toes; permanent curving of the pinkie finger; fusion of wrist bones. The disorder has been reported in three generations of a single Hungarian family. First described by Z. Banki in a 1965 paper, it has been noted as being similar to Liebenberg syndrome, featuring lunatotriquetral fusion of the lunate bone with the triquetral bone, clinodactyly of the fingers, overall short metacarpals, and thin diaphysis of the longer bones, but unlike Liebenberg, no elbow dysplasia is observed.

== Sources ==
This article incorporates public domain material from Banki Syndrome. National Institutes of Health.
