= Muhammad al-Banki =

Bahraini philosopher and writer

- محمد أحمد البنكي
- Born: January 31, 1963; Muharraq, Bahrain
- Died: April 28, 2010 (aged 47); Bahrain Royal Medical Services
- Education: Master of Arts in the Arabic language
- Alma mater: University of Bahrain College of Arts
- Occupation(s): philosopher, Under-Secretary of Culture and Information
- Spouse: Camellia Noureddine
- Children: Jassim, Latifa, Fatima, Rawan

Muhammad Ahmed Al-Banki (1963–2010) (Arabic: محمد أحمد البنكي) was a Bahraini philosopher and writer and a key postmodern in the region in the 1990s. Once an Under-Secretary at the Ministry of Culture and Information, he died on April 28, 2010.

== Career ==
Al-Banki graduated from the College of Arts of the University of Bahrain in 1990, when he began editing the culture column of the local newspaper Al Ayam. After a short time there, he returned to his alma mater to serve as director of its Department of Public Relations and Media. While working there, he edited a series of literary and critical periodicals, ultimately leading to a post as Editor-in-Chief of Al-Watan.

Al-Banki worked briefly as an advisor to Minister of Culture Mai bint Mohammed Al Khalifa. He was appointed Under-Secretary in 2008 and served as such until his death in 2010.

== Publications ==
- عبد الله الغذامي والممارسة النقدية والثقافية ("Abdullah Al Ghadami and the Practice of Cultural Criticism"), Arab Institute for Research & Publishing, 2003
- دريدا عربياً: قراءة التفكيك في الفكر النقدي العربي ("Derrida in the Arab World: Reading Deconstruction in Arab Critical Thought"), 2005
- الرواية والمدينة ("The Novel and the City"), Supreme Council of Culture of Egypt, 2008
- الرواية والتاريخ ("The Novel and History"), 2008
