= Laura Taylor Swain =

American federal judge (born 1958)

Laura Swain

Chief Judge of the United States District Court for the Southern District of New York
- Incumbent
- Assumed office April 10, 2021
- Preceded by: Colleen McMahon

Judge of the United States District Court for the Southern District of New York
- Incumbent
- Assumed office July 11, 2000
- Appointed by: Bill Clinton
- Preceded by: Thomas P. Griesa

Personal details
- Born: Laura Anne Taylor; November 21, 1958 (age 67) Brooklyn, New York, U.S.
- Education: Harvard University (BA, JD)

Laura Anne Taylor Swain (née Taylor; born 1958) is an American lawyer and jurist serving as the chief judge of the United States District Court for the Southern District of New York. She was appointed to the Southern District of New York in 2000 by President Bill Clinton and has served as its chief judge since 2021. She also serves as an Adjunct Professor at the Benjamin N. Cardozo School of Law, which is the law school of Yeshiva University.

== Education and career ==
Swain was born in 1958, in Brooklyn. She graduated from Radcliffe College of Harvard University in 1979 with a Bachelor of Arts and from Harvard Law School in 1982 with a Juris Doctor. From 1982 until 1983, Swain worked as a law clerk for Judge Constance Baker Motley of the United States District Court for the Southern District of New York. From 1983 until 1996, Swain worked in private legal practice in New York City, practicing as an associate, and then counsel, in the areas of ERISA, employee benefits, executive compensation and employment law for the firm Debevoise & Plimpton.

Swain also served as a member of the New York State Board of Law Examiners from 1986 to 1996. She chaired the advisory committee for the Federal Rules of Bankruptcy Procedure from 2007 to 2010.

=== Federal judicial service ===
Swain was a United States bankruptcy judge for the Eastern District of New York from November 1, 1996, to July 11, 2000. On April 25, 2000, President Clinton nominated Swain to be a United States District Judge of the United States District Court for the Southern District of New York to the seat vacated by Judge Thomas P. Griesa. She was confirmed by the United States Senate on June 16, 2000, and received her commission on July 11, 2000. She became chief judge on April 10, 2021, after Colleen McMahon assumed senior status.

=== Puerto Rico debt crisis ===
On May 5, 2017, Chief Justice John Roberts appointed Judge Swain to oversee the debt restructuring case in the Puerto Rican government-debt crisis.

=== Copyright and authorship cases ===
Swain's tenure on the District Court bench has included some of the Southern District of New York's high-profile book authorship disputes. In particular, she presided over Lapine v. Seinfeld and Hoover v. Boncompangi. Both cases were widely covered by the press, and were rich fodder for New York's tabloid newspapers.

=== Lapine v. Seinfeld ===
This action was filed by author Missy Chase Lapine against comedian Jerry Seinfeld and his wife, Jessica Seinfeld, asserting that the couple used ideas for Jessica Seinfeld's cookbook Deceptively Delicious: Simple Secrets to Get Your Kids Eating Good Food from Lapine's book The Sneaky Chef: Simple Strategies for Hiding Healthy Foods in Kids' Favorite Meals.

The Seinfelds denied Lapine's claim. Lapine claimed she experienced substantial financial loss.

As a result of comments made by Mr. Seinfeld about the authorship dispute on the Late Show with David Letterman, Lapine included a cause of action for defamation to her suit.

=== Hoover v. Boncompagni ===
This action was filed by Tatiana Boncompagni Hoover against her older sister Natasha Boncompagni. Hoover, a New York socialite, professional author, and wife of an heir to the Hoover cleaning founder, accused her sister of making unauthorized electronic copies of her book Hedge Fund Wives.

The court granted an emergency temporary restraining order preventing the older sister from further distribution of the pre-publication manuscript.

The case reached closure in early 2009 when Swain entered a consent order stating, "The Defendant has announced to the Court that she is not a co-author of Hedge Fund Wives and has no authorship or co-authorship rights to the work. The Defendant agrees to release any registered or pending copyrights that she has relating to Hedge Fund Wives, and any domain names or other property relating to Hedge Fund Wives or the Plaintiff’s first novel, Gilding Lily."

=== Defamation case ===
On February 19, 2021, Swain dismissed a defamation lawsuit filed by Devin Nunes against CNN. Nunes sought $435 million in damages and claimed that on November 22, 2019, CNN published a false news article and engaged in a conspiracy theory to damage his reputation. Swain noted that under California law, a retraction must be demanded in writing within 20 days of publication, which Nunes failed to request.

== See also ==
- List of African-American federal judges
- List of African-American jurists

Legal offices
Preceded by Thomas P. Griesa	Judge of the United States District Court for the Southern District of New York; 2000–present	Incumbent
Preceded by Colleen McMahon	Chief Judge of the United States District Court for the Southern District of New York; 2021–present	Incumbent
