= John F. Keenan =

American judge (1929–2024)

Senior Judge of the United States District Court for the Southern District of New York
- In office December 31, 1996 – October 27, 2024

Judge of the United States Foreign Intelligence Surveillance Court
- In office July 24, 1994 – May 18, 2001
- Appointed by: William Rehnquist
- Preceded by: Frank Harlan Freedman
- Succeeded by: Nathaniel M. Gorton

Judge of the United States District Court for the Southern District of New York
- In office September 20, 1983 – December 31, 1996
- Appointed by: Ronald Reagan
- Preceded by: Lloyd Francis MacMahon
- Succeeded by: Colleen McMahon

Personal details
- Born: John Fontaine Keenan; November 23, 1929 New York City, U.S.
- Died: October 27, 2024 (aged 94) New York City, U.S.
- Spouse: Diane Nicholson (m. 1956)
- Children: One child, two grandchildren
- Education: Manhattan College (BBA); Fordham University (LLB)

John Fontaine Keenan (November 23, 1929 – October 27, 2024) was an American judge for the United States District Court for the Southern District of New York.

== Background ==
Born in Manhattan, New York City, on November 23, 1929, Keenan graduated from Regis High School in 1947. He received a Bachelor of Business Administration from Manhattan College in 1951. He received a Bachelor of Laws from Fordham University School of Law in 1954. He was in the United States Army from 1954 to 1956.

== Early career ==
Keenan was in private practice of law in New York City in 1956. He was an assistant district attorney of New York County from 1956 to 1976. He was an assistant district attorney in charge of Supreme Court Bureau of New York County from 1968 to 1969. He was an assistant district attorney in charge of homicide bureau in New York County from 1970 to 1973. He was the chief assistant district attorney of Queens County in 1973. He was an administrative assistant district attorney in charge of trials in New York County in 1974. He was the chief assistant district attorney of New York County from 1974 to 1976. He was a deputy state attorney general/special prosecutor of corruption in New York City from 1976 to 1979.

He was the Chairman and President of New York City Off-Track Betting Corporation from 1979 to 1982. He was the criminal justice coordinator of New York City from 1982 to 1983. He was a member of the Republican Party.

== Federal judicial service ==
Keenan was nominated by President Ronald Reagan on September 13, 1983, to a seat on the United States District Court for the Southern District of New York vacated by Judge Lloyd Francis MacMahon. He was confirmed by the United States Senate on September 20, 1983, and received commission the same day. He assumed senior status on December 31, 1996. He served as a Judge of the United States Foreign Intelligence Surveillance Court from 1994 to 2001. He was a member of the United States Judicial Panel on Multidistrict Litigation from 1998 to 2006.

=== Notable cases ===
His rulings include authorizing the publication of Jeffrey Toobin's Opening Arguments, an account of the Iran–Contra affair, over the objections and threat of prosecution by Lawrence E. Walsh; managing the delivery of medical relief funds to India following the Union Carbide Corporation gas plant disaster in Bhopal and dismissing attempts to sue Union Carbide in U.S. courts rather than in India; denying a gay Irish group the right to hold its own march on the same day as the city's St. Patrick's Day parade in 1995, determining that the city's claims that it would pose a safety hazard trumped the group's First Amendment claims. He presided at the trial of Bess Myerson, New York City Cultural Affairs Commissioner, on corruption charges in 1988 and that of Philippine first lady Imelda Marcos on racketeering charges in 1990.

=== Reversed cases ===
On August 16, 2010, Keenan sentenced Mahmoud Reza Banki to 30 months in prison. This sentence was overturned on October 24, 2011, at which time the United States Court of Appeals for the Second Circuit ruled in favor of Banki reversing the sanctions charges against him. Appellate court ruled that Judge John F. Keenan had erred at trial; in denying Banki's defense request to instruct the jury on the law that specifically exempts family money as an exception to the sanctions law, permitting such transfers without the need for a license. The final appellate court brief stated: "Banki's conviction [on the sanctions charges] cannot stand".

== Personal life and death ==
In 1956, Keenan married Diane Nicholson, and they had a daughter. He died at his home in the Bronx on October 27, 2024, at the age of 94.

== Sources ==
Legal offices
Preceded by Lloyd Francis MacMahon	Judge of the United States District Court for the Southern District of New York; 1983–1996	Succeeded by Colleen McMahon
Preceded by Frank Harlan Freedman	Judge of the United States Foreign Intelligence Surveillance Court; 2003–2010	Succeeded by Nathaniel M. Gorton
