= Mahmoud Reza Banki =

Iranian-American scientist

Reza Banki
- Born: 1976 (age 49–50); Tehran, Imperial State of Iran
- Citizenship: United States
- Education: University of California, Berkeley (BA, BS); Princeton University (MA, PhD); University of California, Los Angeles (MBA)
- Title: CFO of X Corp. (2024–2025)
- Website: Official website

Mahmoud Reza Banki (Persian: محمودرضا بانکی; born 1976) is an Iranian-American scientist, management consultant and business executive.

Born in Tehran, Iran, Banki immigrated to the US to attend college and became a naturalized US citizen in the 1990s. In January 2010, Banki was arrested and charged with violating US sanctions against Iran by the United States Attorney's office in New York City. Ultimately Banki won his case on appeal, and it was permanently closed in July 2012. Banki spoke about his case at a TED Talk in 2014, presenting a case for change in criminal justice. As of 2015 a documentary film about the case was being made. In The Moth podcast released January 2017, Banki spoke to the personal toll of the ordeal. Banki has also spoken before various audiences for the cause of improving the criminal justice system. As of 2022, Banki was Chief Financial Officer and Chief Strategy Officer at leading streaming company Tubi. On January 20, 2021, Banki received a full and unconditional pardon from the President of the United States. He was the CFO of X Corp. between November 2024 and October 2025.

== Biography ==
After migrating to America, Banki graduated from the University of California, Berkeley and subsequently earned a PhD in chemical engineering with a focus on biotechnology from Princeton University. He has published numerous scientific articles and a biotechnology book. After completing his PhD, he worked as a management consultant at the New York City office of McKinsey & Company. In January 2010, Banki was arrested and prosecuted by the United States Attorney's office in New York City. He was charged with violating US sanctions against Iran. He spent 22 months in prison before winning his case on appeal in the Second Circuit Court of Appeals, with all charges against him related to the sanctions being dismissed. After his release Banki earned a Master of Business Administration from the University of California, Los Angeles, and worked at NBCUniversal.

== United States v. Banki case ==
=== Background ===
Banki's family lived in Iran and through the early 2000s with his parents' marriage falling apart, the family decided to send a portion of the family assets to the US. Between 2006 and 2009 Banki's family sent proceeds of his parents' divorce settlement (approximately $3.4 million) to him, from Iran to the US. The money came into a single bank account at Bank of America, over multiple transfers through an informal money transfer systems which the defendant argued was legal and the only means of sending money out of Iran at the time. Banki used the majority of this money to purchase an apartment in downtown Manhattan.

Prosecutors argued that over this three-year period Banki had violated the sanctions imposed by the US on Iran. The indictment accused Banki of violating the sanctions law, running an informal underground bank, and helping "manage, supervise, operate, and conduct" an unlicensed money transmittal service through which he directly or indirectly facilitated and violated the Iran sanctions. In essence, the charges against Banki stemmed from prosecution allegations that he, as an American citizen, had violated US sanctions on Iran.

=== Charges ===
On January 7th, 2010, U.S. Immigration and Customs Enforcement (ICE) agents authorized by a grand jury with a search and arrest warrant entered the residence of Mahmoud Reza Banki in New York City and arrested him. He was arraigned before Judge John F. Keenan on an indictment charging him with three counts: 1. Conspiracy to violate the U.S.-imposed Iran sanctions and conspiracy to run an unlicensed money transmittal system, 2. Violation of the Iran sanctions, and 3. Running of an unlicensed money transmittal business. The indictment accused Banki of receiving $4.7 million in violation of the Iran sanctions. Prosecutors filed a superseding indictment later changing the amount to $3.4 million and adding two false statement charges to the three initial charges.

=== Trial and conviction ===
On May 10, 2010, a three-week trial commenced where Second Circuit District judge John F. Keenan presided. The trial concluded on June 4 when the jury returned a guilty verdict on all five counts, albeit, guilty on a lesser charge of aiding and abetting rather than running a sanctions violation money transmittal system.

On June 7, 2010, despite the superseding indictment charge of $3.4 million, the same jury agreed to forfeit one bank account associated with a $6,000 transaction as the proceeds of the charges and the guilty verdict. The jury ruled that Mahmoud Reza Banki's other assets including the apartment he had purchased with the family funds he had received was not a direct proceeds of any crime and not forfeitable.

Judge Keenan overruled the jury only in the case of the forfeiture verdict on the basis that the jury might have been "confused" and awarded the government prosecutors a money judgment order, essentially ignoring the jury verdict on forfeiture and awarding the US Attorney's office $3.4 million, to be paid by Banki. This would have been the same as if the jury had come to the decision of full forfeiture of all of Banki's assets.

=== Sentencing and imprisonment ===
On August 16, 2010, Judge Keenan sentenced Banki to 30 months in prison. Shortly after being sentenced Banki filed for appeal. The Iranian American Bar Association along with 10 other advocacy and civil rights groups filed a separate amicus brief with the United States Court of Appeals for the Second Circuit. The brief argued that U.S.-Iran sanctions "are not aimed at the Iranian people, and therefore they contain exemptions permitting certain humanitarian transactions and family remittances."

For about 11 months (from January 7, 2010, through December 1, 2010) Banki was held in high and maximum security detention centers in Manhattan and Brooklyn (MCC and MDC) with BOP# 63037-054. For the month of December in 2010, Banki was transferred to the Taft Correctional Institute's deportation prison outside of Bakersfield in California. In January 2011, Banki was transferred to the lower security Taft prison where he remained pending the appellate decision. Upon release Banki had served 665 days, nearly 22 months in prison.

=== Appellate reversal ===
On October 24, 2011, the United States Court of Appeals for the Second Circuit ruled in favor of Banki and reversed the sanctions charges against him. Judge Keenan's court-ordered Banki's release 10 days later on November 2, 2011.

The appellate court ruled that Judge John F. Keenan had erred at trial; in denying Banki's defense request to instruct the jury on the law that specifically exempts family money as an exception to the sanctions law, permitting such transfers without the need for a license. The final appellate court brief stated: "Banki's conviction [on the sanctions charges] cannot stand".

Prosecutors reopened the case to pursue a retrial in February 2012. However, after a few months of delay and the assignment of a new judge, the case was closed criminally with no option for future civil or criminal prosecution. Rather than pay for the high cost of a second criminal defense trial, Banki agreed to relinquish $710k of his assets. In exchange, prosecutors agreed that Banki was not guilty of the sanctions charges without going through a second trial and that they would end pursuing the case further in criminal or civil courts.

The case was permanently closed on July 24, 2012. In the final court hearing, Banki's prison record was cleared. During the hearing, Banki said he had lived through "the darkest hours" of his life while in prison. "I watched my life pass me by. Those days will never be replaced". Judge Engelmayer in clearing Banki's prison record called him a "talented man, even brilliant". The judge also stated: ". . . the damage to Mr. Banki's life brought about by his lengthy incarceration, occasioned by his confinement, cannot be measured only by the 22 months in which he lost his liberty and which he cannot get back".

=== Aftermath ===
Trump pardon for Mahmoud Reza Banki, and 26 other individuals, on January 19, 2021 (the last full day of Trump's term of office).

Since his release, Banki has completed a master's in business administration from UCLA Anderson School of Management. Banki spoke about his case for the first time publicly at a TED Conference at UCLA in 2014 in an effort to raise awareness about the justice system. He also spoke about the uncertain life path he now faces in the US and the difficulty he faces in finding employment due to his continued status as a felon despite his appellate win. There are plans for a documentary of his story.

With support from 13 Congressmen and a Senator, Banki filed for a Presidential Pardon. As of 2022, Banki was Chief Financial Officer and Chief Strategy Officer at leading streaming company Tubi. Banki was granted a full pardon on January 20, 2021.
