= Pravat Tripathy =

Indian politician

Pravat Tripathy was a leader of Biju Janata Dal and a member of Odisha Legislative Assembly, was expelled from the party due to involvement in Chit fund scam and anti-party activities. He is known to be one of the most corrupt members of BJD and was arrested by the Central Bureau of Investigation (CBI) for his links with Artha Tatwa Group in the multi-hundred crore chit fund scam. The four-time MLA’s was involved in the Ponzi scheme that scammed common people of their savings.

Due to his tainted image, involvement in the scam and anti people activities, he was suspended from BJD in 2014. He was later expelled permanently from the party by BJD Supremo Naveen Patnaik due to anti-party activities.
