= Chandaka Elephant Sanctuary =

Wildlife reserve in Odisha, India

- IUCN category IV (habitat/species management area)
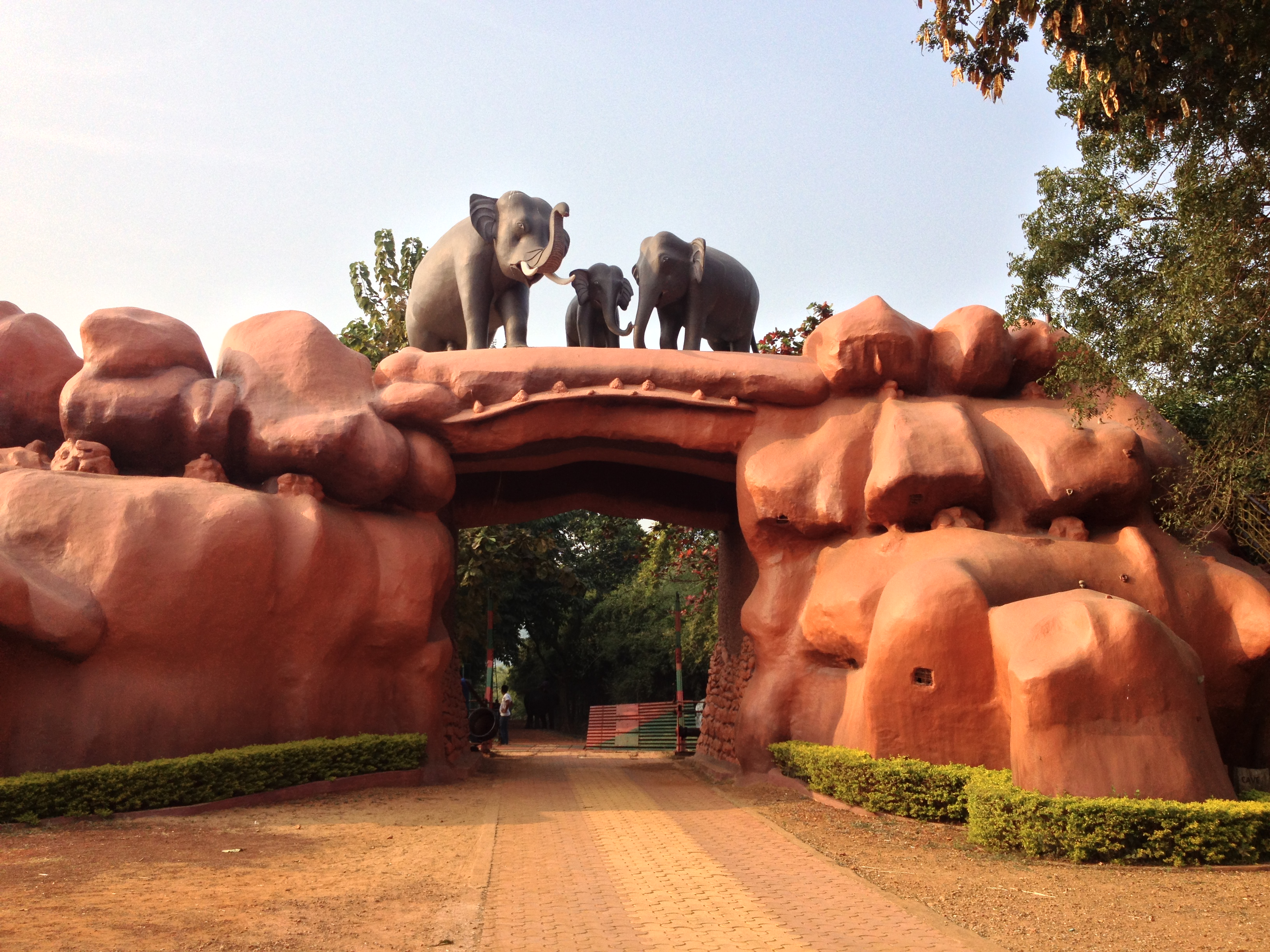
- Chandaka Forest and Elephant Reserve

- Location within Odisha Location within India
- Interactive map of Chandaka Elephant Sanctuary
- Nearest city: Cuttack
- Coordinates: 20°21′N 85°40′E
- Area: 175.79 square kilometres (67.87 sq mi)
- Established: 1982
- Governing body: Divisional Forest Officer, Chandaka

Chandaka Elephant Sanctuary is a wildlife reserve in the southern fringe of Cuttack district in the Indian state of Odisha. Nestled on Khurdha uplands of the Eastern Ghats biotic region, Chandaka forest is spread over 175.79 km^{2} (67.87 sq mi) of rolling table land and small sprawling hillocks of Khurdha and Cuttack districts. It was designated as an elephant reserve in December 1982.

== Flora ==
The floral diversity is distributed in six types, viz., secondary moist miscellaneous semi-evergreen forests, moist Xylia xylocarpa forests, coastal Sal (Shorea robusta) forests, thorny bamboo (Bambusa bambos) brakes, planted teak and Eupatorium scrub. The main tree species are Strychnos nux-vomica, kalicha, belo, kangada, Pterospermum xylocarpum, sunari, kumbhi, jamu, karanja, teak and sidha. Male bamboo (Dendrocalamus strictus) has a very restricted distribution. Common medicinal plants include Mucuna pruriens, brudhadaraka, bhuinlimbo, guduchi lata, shalparni (Desmodium gangeticum), satabari, bhuin-kakharu, indrajaba, thalkudi, apamaranga, kurchi, and patalgaruda. A few species of ground orchids, ferns, club mosses, bryophytes and lichens are distributed in shady wet pockets and rock escarpments.

== Fauna ==
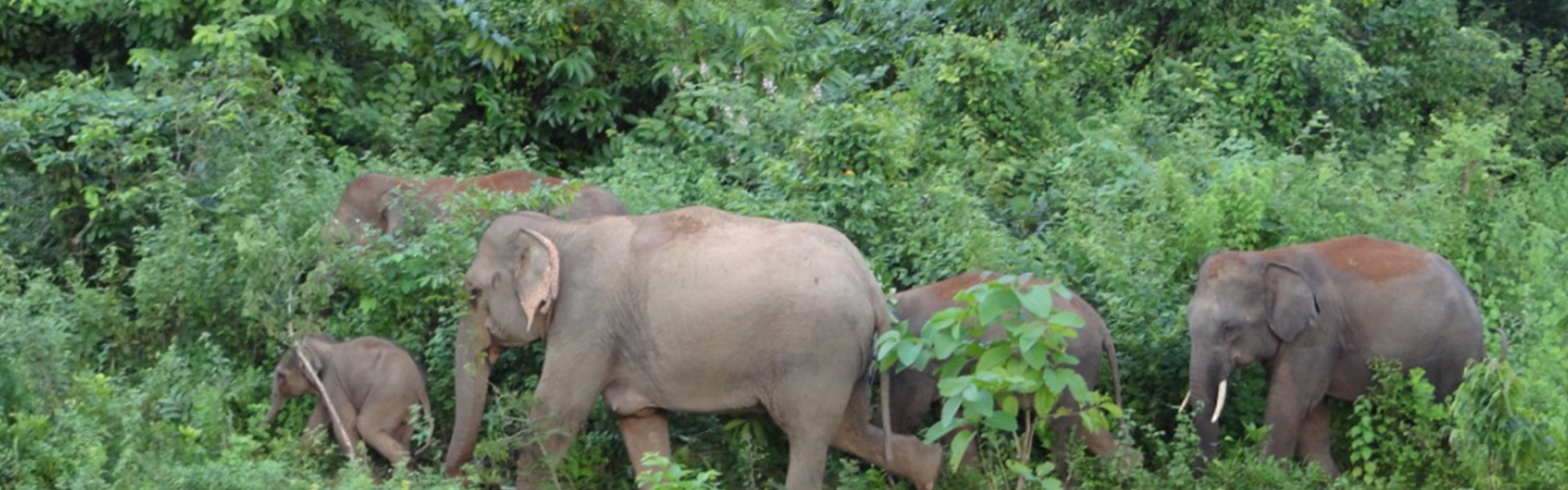
Elephants inside Chandaka Dampara forest

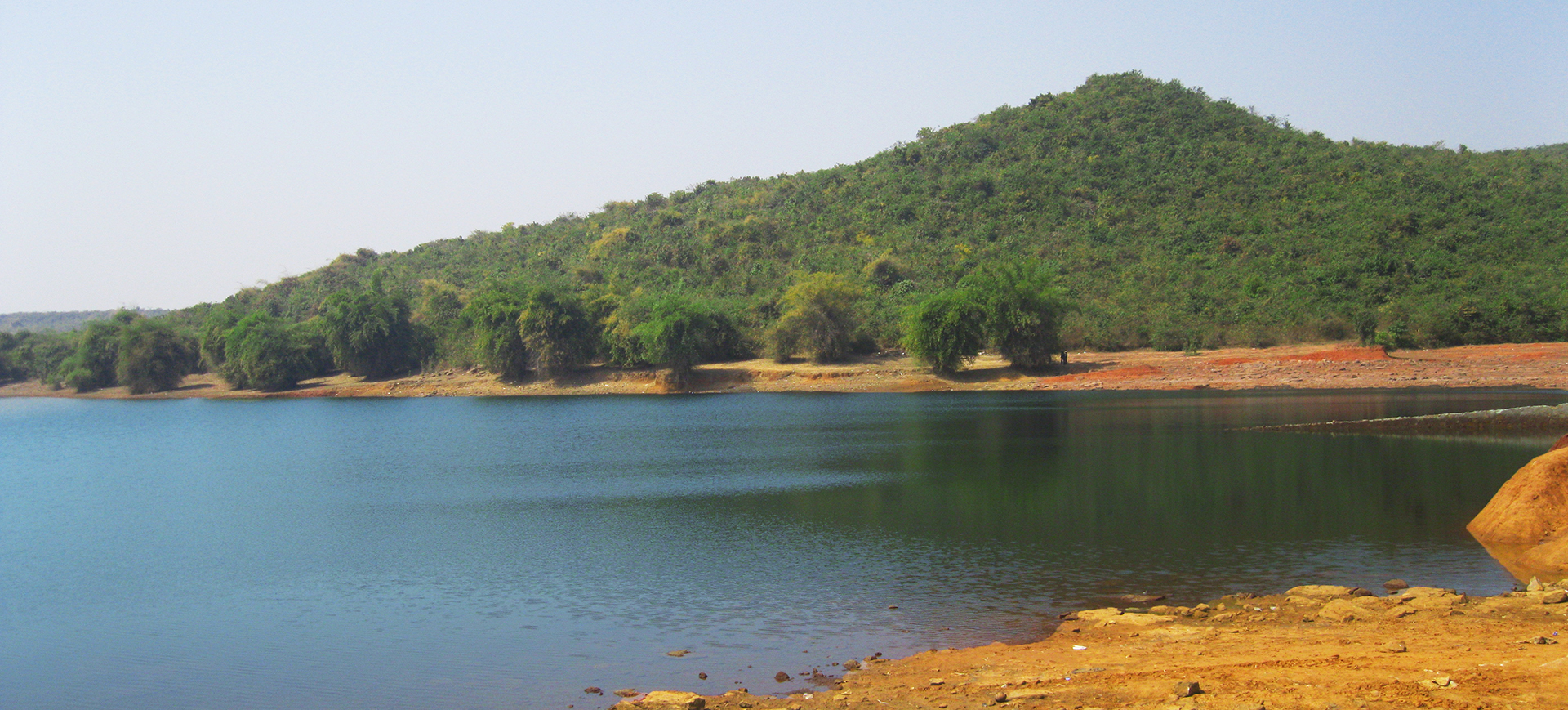
Deras Dam, located within the reserve

The Indian elephant is the flagship species and indicative of the potential productivity of the habitat. The leopard is at the apex of the biological pyramid. Chital, barking deer, mouse deer, wild boar, gray langur, rhesus monkey, small Indian civet, Indian mongoose, ruddy mongoose, pangolin, sloth bear, honey badger, Indian wolf and hyena are other mammals of the area. Chital is commonly encountered in groups of 3–7 individuals on forest roads, forest openings, grass lands, foreshore of water bodies and even near guard camps. Wild dogs are occasionally seen. After 40 years researchers have found evidence of a tigress and her cub in the forest; in the winter of 2012, they spotted footprints of those two.

Prominent birds of the sanctuary are Indian peafowl, red junglefowl, crested serpent eagle, great horned owl, Black-hooded oriole, paradise flycatcher, coucal and stone curlew. Kumarkhunti reservoir, during winter, serves as a transient roosting and feeding ground for several migratory duck species, notably garganey and common teal, Eaton's pintail, Indian spot-billed duck and Brahminy duck and white eyed Baer's pochard. Lesser whistling teal, little grebe, cotton teal, nakta, lesser cormorant, bronze-winged jacana, white-breasted waterhen, pied, white breasted and little blue kingfishers and red wattled lapwings are other resident birds around. In July the reservoir transforms into an abode of migratory birds, mainly open-billed stork, pond heron, egrets and cormorants. Butterflies are abundant during monsoon and post-monsoon months.

Among reptiles, the Asiatic rock python and Bengal monitor lizard are quite common. Chameleon, common skink, Indian flap shell turtle, Russell's viper, bamboo pit viper, common krait and Indian bronze back are indicative reptiles. Mugger crocodiles have remarkably adapted to large water bodies after their release.

The Zoological Survey of India (in 2002) reported 37 species of mammals, 167 species of birds, 33 species of reptiles, 13 species of amphibians and 28 species of fish in this sanctuary.
