= Odisha =

State in Eastern India

- State
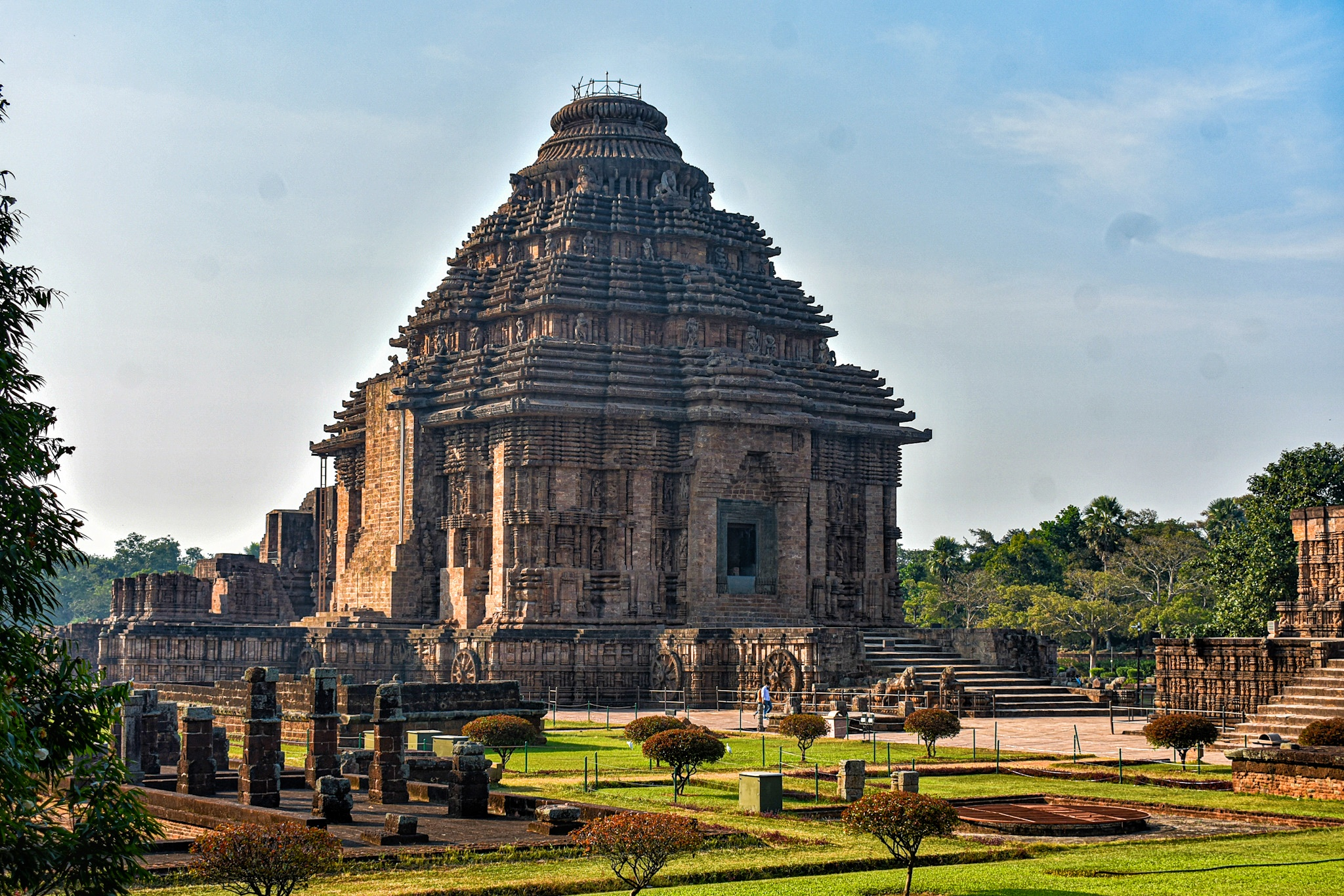
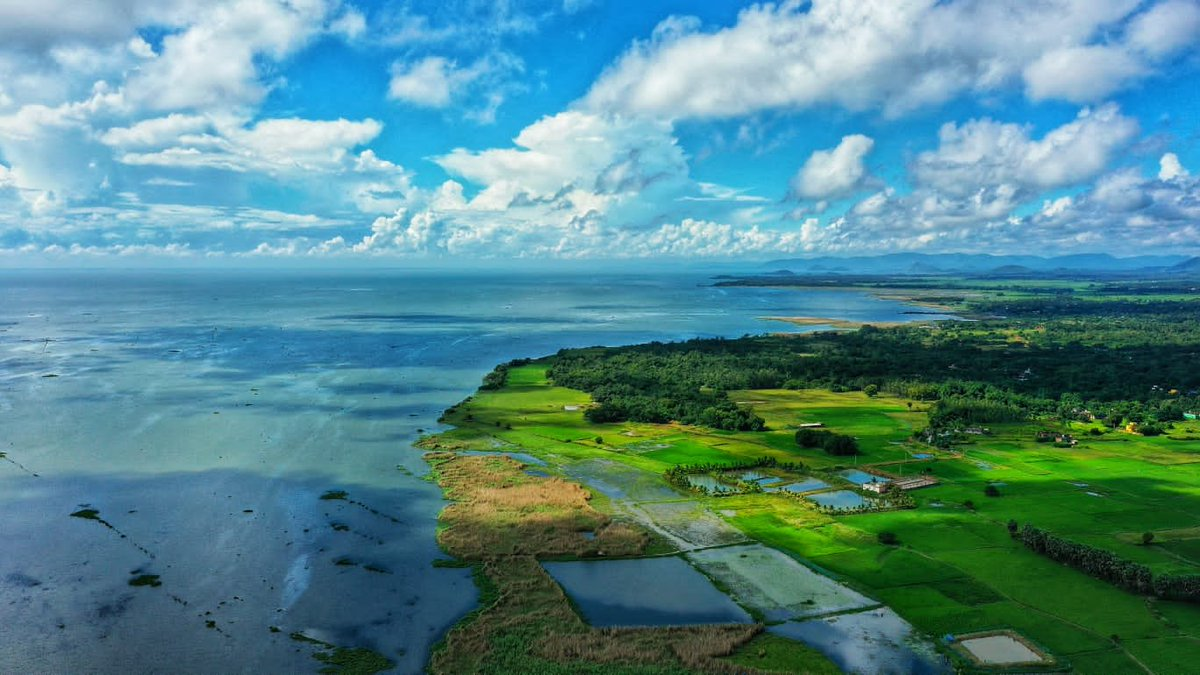
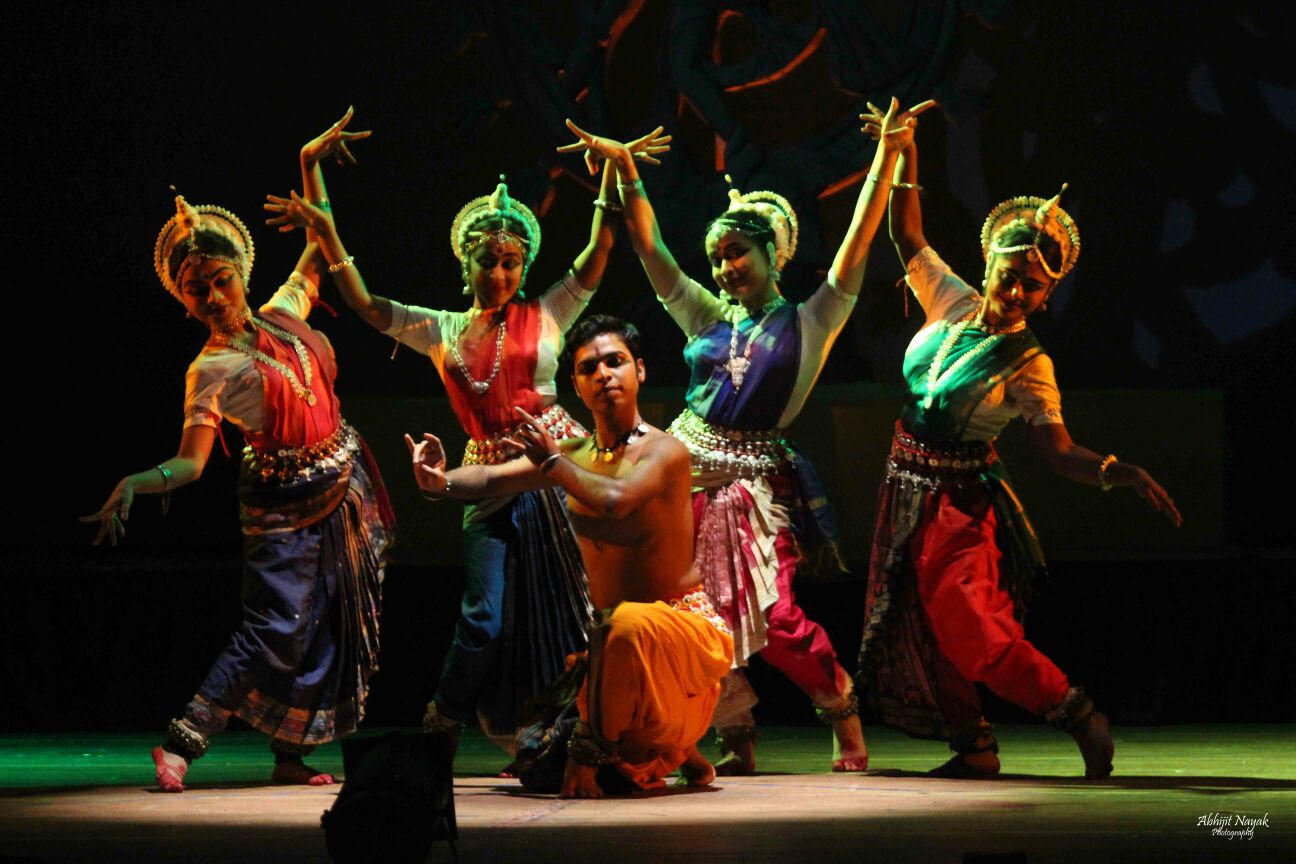
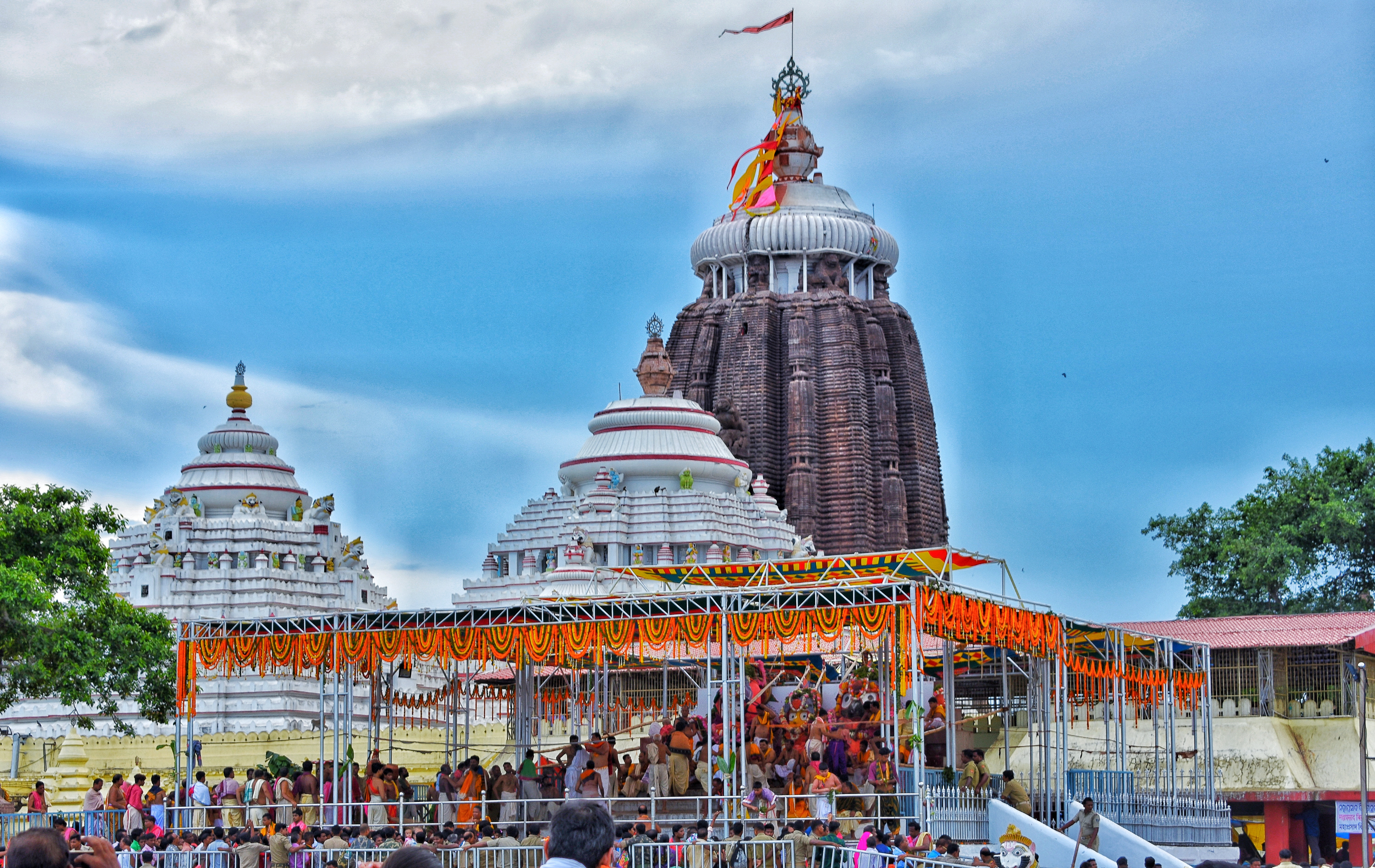
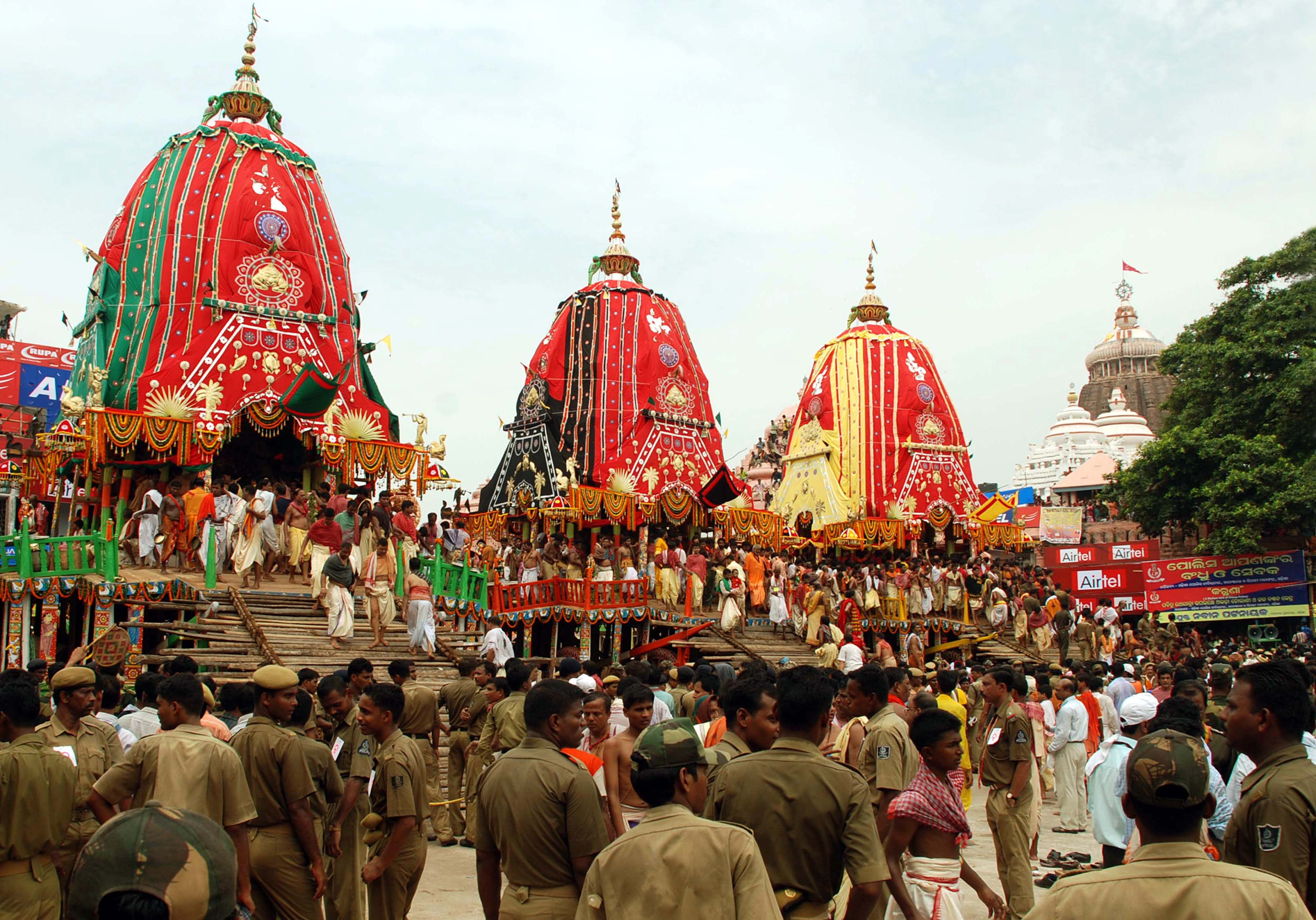
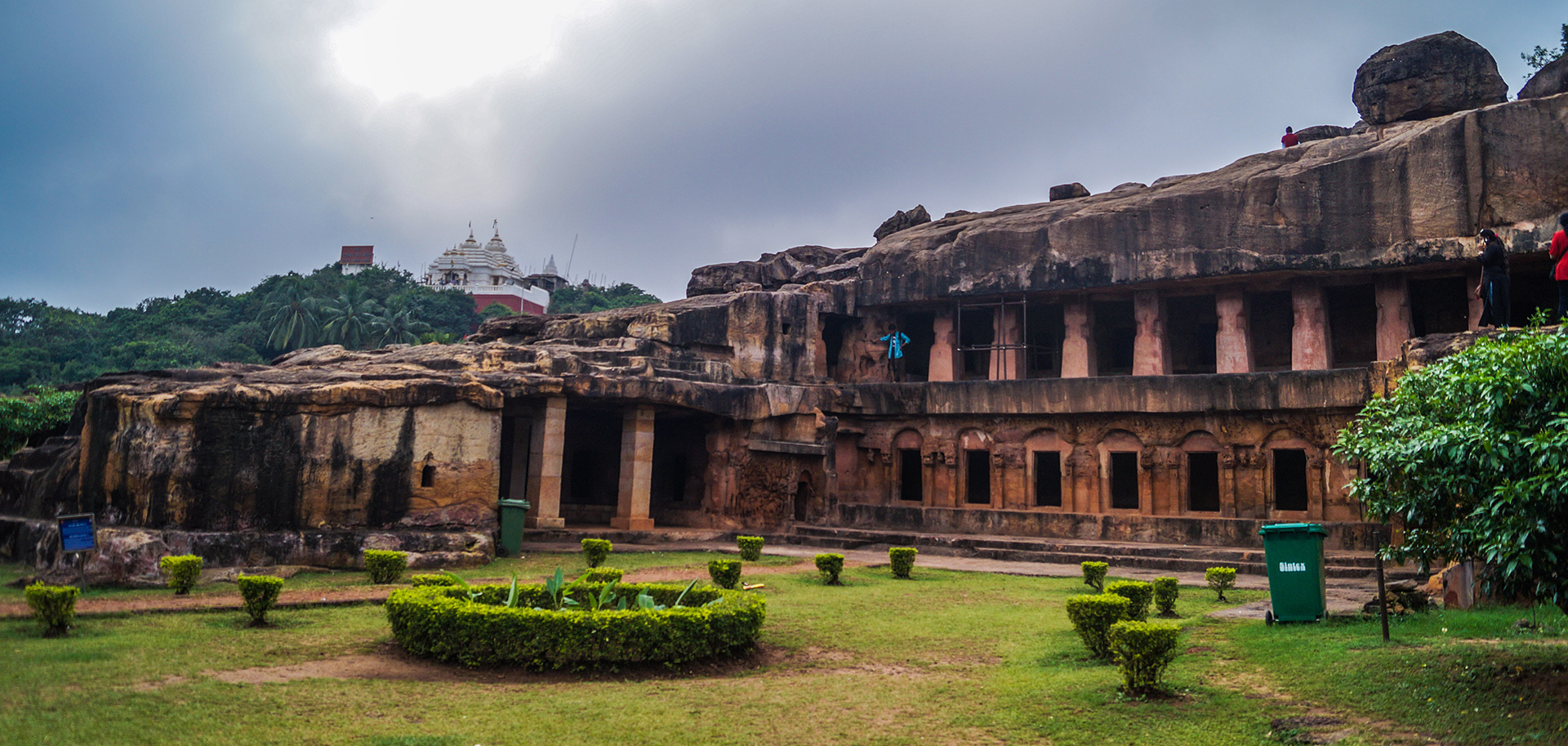
- Konark Sun Temple Chilika Lake Odissi Jagannath Temple Ratha Yatra Udayagiri Caves

- Emblem of Odisha
- Etymology: "Land of the Odias"
- Nickname(s): Soul of India; India’s Best Kept Secret
- Motto: Satyameva Jayate (Sanskrit) "Truth alone triumphs"
- Anthem: Bande Utkala Janani (Odia) "I Adore Thee, O Mother Utkala"
- Location of Odisha in India
- Coordinates: 20.27°N 85.82°E
- Country: India
- Region: East India
- Previously was: Orissa Province
- Formation: 1 April 1936; 90 years ago Utkala Dibasa
- Capital: Bhubaneswar
- Largest city: Bhubaneswar
- Districts: 30 (3 divisions)

Government
  - Body: Government of Odisha
  - Governor: Braj Mohan Ram
  - Chief Minister: Mohan Charan Majhi (BJP)
  - Deputy Chief Minister: Kanak Vardhan Singh Deo (BJP); Pravati Parida (BJP)

Area
  - Total: 155,707 km^{2} (60,119 sq mi)
  - Rank: 8th

Dimensions
  - Length: 500 km (310 mi)
  - Width: 1,030 km (640 mi)
- Highest elevation (Deomali): 1,672 m (5,486 ft)
- Lowest elevation (Bay of Bengal): 0 m (0 ft)

Population (2011)
  - Total: ▲41,974,218
  - Rank: 11th
  - Density: 307/km^{2} (800/sq mi)
  - Urban: 16.68%
  - Rural: 83.32%
- Demonym: Odia

Language
  - Official: Odia & English
  - Official script: Odia script

GDP
  - Total (2026-27): ▲₹11.07 lakh crore (US$120 billion) (nominal) ▲$544.25 billion (PPP)
  - Rank: 15th
  - Per capita: ▲₹263,733 (US$2,800) (nominal) ▲$12,966 (PPP) (21st)
- Time zone: UTC+05:30 (IST)
- ISO 3166 code: IN-OD
- Vehicle registration: OD
- HDI (2022): ▲0.610 Medium (33rd)
- Literacy (2024): 79.0% (25th)
- Sex ratio (2011): 979♀/1000 ♂ (9th)
- Website: odisha.gov.in
- Symbols of Odisha
- Foundation day: Utkala Dibas
- Bird: Indian roller
- Fish: Mahanadi mahseer
- Flower: Asoka
- Mammal: Sambar
- Tree: Sacred Fig
- State highway mark
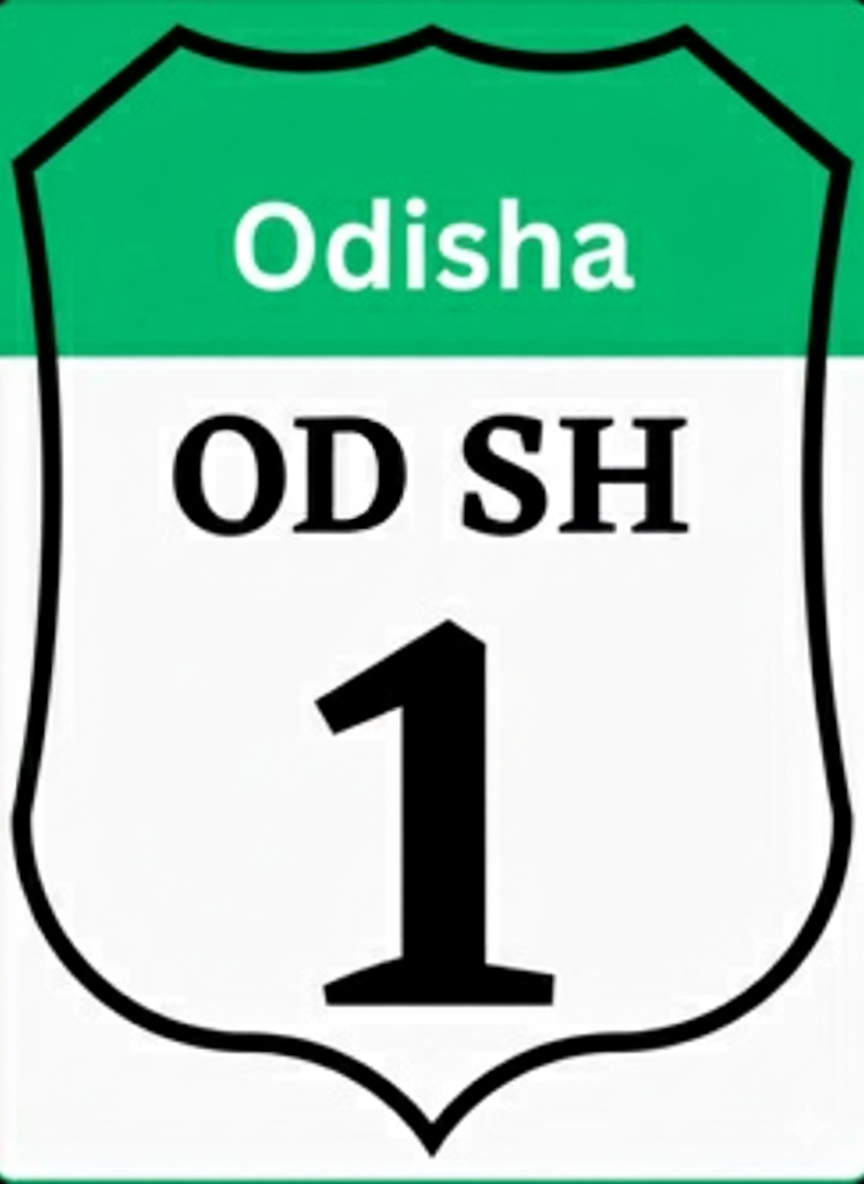
- State highway of Odisha; OD SH1 – OD SH57
- List of Indian state symbols

Odisha (Oriya: oṛiśā, pronounced [oˈɽisa]), spelled Orissa until 2011, is a state located in eastern India. It is the eighth-largest state by area, and the eleventh-largest by population, with over 41 million inhabitants. The state also has the third-largest population of Scheduled Tribes in India. It neighbours the states of Jharkhand and West Bengal to the north, Chhattisgarh to the west, and Andhra Pradesh to the south. Odisha has a coastline of 485 kilometres (301 mi) along the Bay of Bengal in the Indian Ocean. The region is also known as Utkaḷa and is mentioned by this name in India's national anthem, Jana Gana Mana.

The ancient kingdom of Kalinga, which was invaded by the Mauryan Emperor Ashoka in 261 BCE resulting in the Kalinga War, coincides with the borders of modern-day Odisha. The modern boundaries of Odisha were demarcated by the British Indian government, the Orissa Province was established on 1 April 1936, consisting of the Odia-speaking districts of Bihar and Orissa Province, Madras Presidency and Central Provinces. Utkala Divas (lit. 'Odisha Day') is celebrated on 1 April. Cuttack was made the capital of the region by Anantavarman Chodaganga in c. 1135, after which the city was used as the capital by many rulers, through the British era until 1948. Thereafter, Bhubaneswar became the capital of Odisha.

== Etymology ==
The terms Odisha and Orissa (Odia: ଓଡ଼ିଶା, Oṛissa) derive from the ancient Prakrit word Odda Visaya (also Udra Bibhasha or Odra Bibhasha) as in the Tirumalai inscription of Rajendra Chola I, which is dated to 1025. Sarala Das, who translated the Mahabharata into the Odia language in the 15th century, refers to the Odra Rashtra as "Odisha". The inscriptions of Kapilendra Deva of the Gajapati Kingdom (1435–67) on the walls of temples in Puri call the region Odisha or Odisha Rajya.

In 2011, the English rendering of ଓଡ଼ିଶା was changed from Orissa to Odisha, and the name of its language from Oriya to Odia, by the passage of the Orissa (Alteration of Name) Bill, 2010 and the Constitution (113th Amendment) Bill, 2010 in the Parliament. The Hindi rendering उड़ीसा (uṛīsā) was also modified to ओड़िशा (or̥iśā). After a brief debate, the lower house, Lok Sabha, passed the bill and amendment on 9 November 2010. On 24 March 2011, Rajya Sabha, the upper house of Parliament, also passed the bill and the amendment. The changes in spelling were made with the intention of having the English and Hindi renditions conform to the Odia transliteration. However, the underlying Odia texts were nevertheless transliterated incorrectly as per the Hunterian system, the official national transliteration standard, in which the transliterations would be Orisha and Oria instead.

== History ==
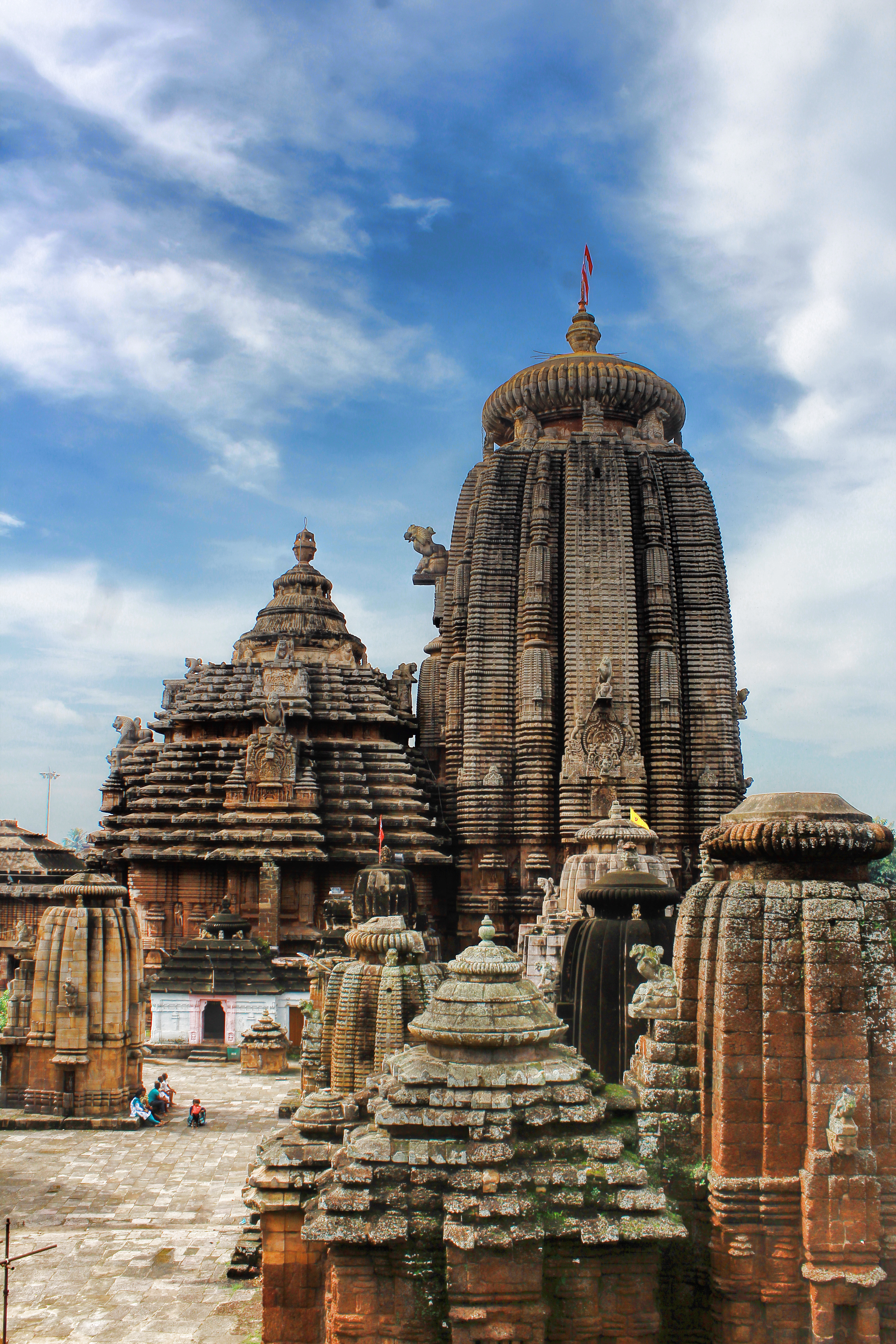
Lingaraja Temple built by the Somavanshi king Jajati Keshari

Prehistoric Acheulian tools dating to Lower Paleolithic era have been discovered in various places in the region, implying an early settlement by humans. Kalinga has been mentioned in ancient texts like Mahabharata, Vayu Purana and Mahagovinda Suttanta.

According to political scientist Sudama Misra, the Kalinga janapada originally comprised the area covered by the Puri and Ganjam districts. The Sabar people of Odisha have also been mentioned in the Mahabharata. Baudhayana mentions Kalinga as not yet being influenced by Vedic traditions, implying it followed mostly tribal traditions.

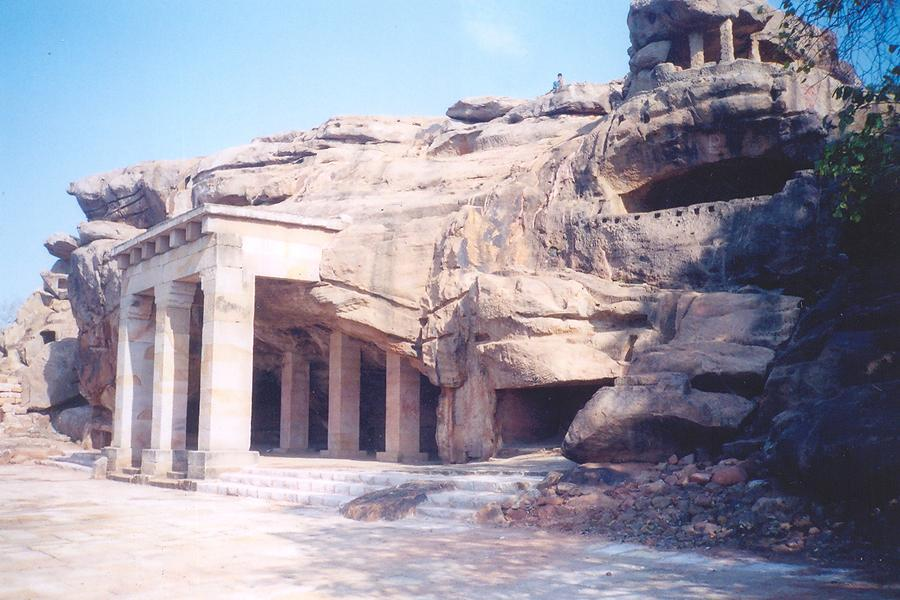
Hathigumpha on the Udayagiri Hills built in c. 150 BCE

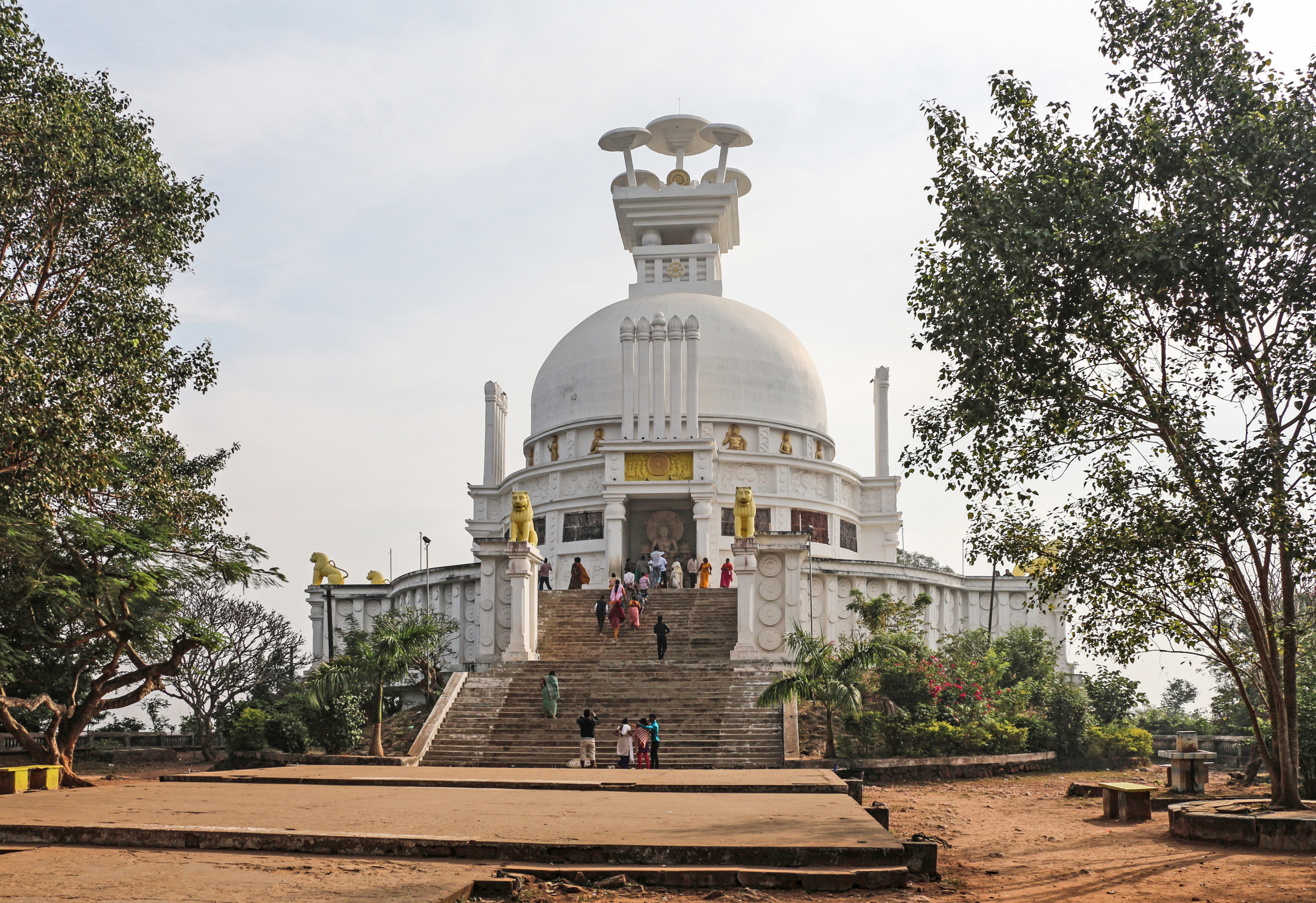
Shanti Stupa at Dhauli is the location where Kalinga War was fought in c. 260 BCE

Ashoka of the Mauryan dynasty conquered Kalinga in the bloody Kalinga War in 261 BCE, which was the eighth year of his reign. According to his own edicts, in that war about 100,000 people were killed, 150,000 were captured and more were affected. The resulting bloodshed and suffering of the war is said to have deeply affected Ashoka. He turned into a pacifist and converted to Buddhism.

By c. 150 BCE, Emperor Kharavela, who was possibly a contemporary of Demetrius I of Bactria, conquered a major part of the Indian sub-continent. Kharavela was a Jain ruler. He also built the monastery atop the Udayagiri hill. Subsequently, the region was ruled by monarchs, such as Samudragupta and Shashanka. It was also a part of Harsha's empire.

The city of Brahmapur in Odisha is also known to have been the capital of the Pauravas during the closing years of 4th century CE. Nothing was heard from the Pauravas from about the 3rd century CE, because they were annexed by the Yaudheya Republic, who in turn submitted to the Mauryans. It was only at the end of 4th century CE, that they established royalty at Brahmapur, after about 700 years.

Later, the kings of the Somavamsi dynasty began to unite the region. By the reign of Yayati II, c. 1025 CE, they had integrated the region into a single kingdom. Yayati II is supposed to have built the Lingaraj temple at Bhubaneswar. They were replaced by the Eastern Ganga dynasty. Notable rulers of the dynasty were Anantavarman Chodaganga, who began reconstruction on the present-day Shri Jagannath Temple in Puri (c. 1135), and Narasimhadeva I, who constructed the Konark temple (c. 1250).

The Eastern Ganga Dynasty was followed by the Gajapati Kingdom. The region resisted integration into the Mughal Empire until 1568, when it was conquered by Sultanate of Bengal. Mukunda Deva, who is considered the last independent king of Kalinga, was defeated and was killed in battle by a rebel Ramachandra Bhanja. Ramachandra Bhanja himself was killed by Bayazid Khan Karrani. In 1591, Man Singh I, then governor of Bihar, led an army to take Odisha from the Karranis of Bengal. They agreed to treaty because their leader Qutlu Khan Lohani had recently died. But they then broke the treaty by attacking the temple town of Puri. Man Singh returned in 1592 and pacified the region.

In 1751, the Nawab of Bengal Alivardi Khan ceded the region to the Maratha Empire.

The British had occupied the Northern Circars, comprising the southern coast of Odisha, as a result of the Second Carnatic War by 1760, and incorporated them into the Madras Presidency gradually. In 1803, the British ousted the Marathas from the Puri-Cuttack region of Odisha during the Second Anglo-Maratha War. The northern and western districts of Odisha were incorporated into the Bengal Presidency.

The Orissa famine of 1866 caused an estimated 1 million deaths. Following this, large-scale irrigation projects were undertaken. In 1903, the Utkal Sammilani organisation was founded to demand the unification of Odia-speaking regions into one state. On 1 April 1912, the Bihar and Orissa Province was formed. On 1 April 1936, Bihar and Orissa were split into separate provinces. The new province of Orissa came into existence on a linguistic basis during the British rule in India, with Sir John Austen Hubback as the first governor. Following India's independence, on 15 August 1947, 27 princely states signed the document to join Orissa. Most of the Orissa Tributary States, a group of princely states, acceded to Orissa in 1948, after the collapse of the Eastern States Union.

== Geography ==
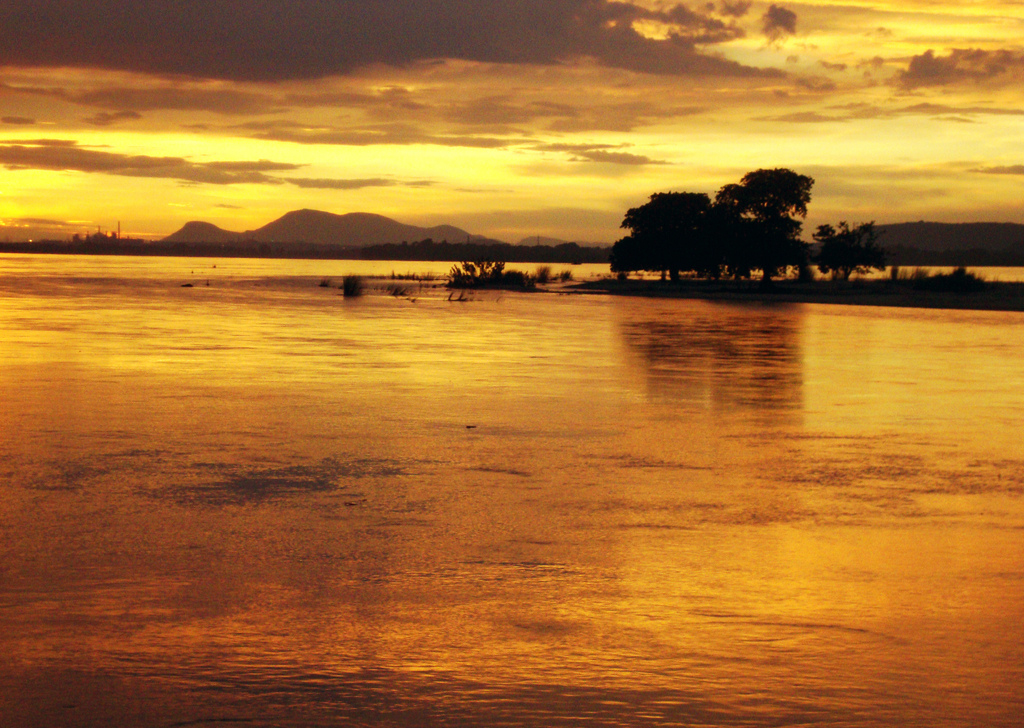
Mahanadi river near Cuttack

Odisha lies between the latitudes 17.780N and 22.730N, and between longitudes 81.37E and 87.53E. The state has an area of 155,707 km^{2}, which is 4.87% of total area of India, and a coastline of 450 km. In the eastern part of the state lies the coastal plain. It extends from the Subarnarekha River in the north to the Rushikulya River in the south. The lake Chilika is part of the coastal plains. The plains are rich in fertile silt deposited by the six major rivers flowing into the Bay of Bengal: Subarnarekha, Budhabalanga, Baitarani, Brahmani, Mahanadi, and Rushikulya. The National Rice Research Institute (NRRI), a Food and Agriculture Organization-recognised rice gene bank and research institute, is situated on the banks of Mahanadi in Cuttack. The stretch between Puri and Bhadrak in Odisha juts out a little into the sea, making it vulnerable to any cyclonic activity.

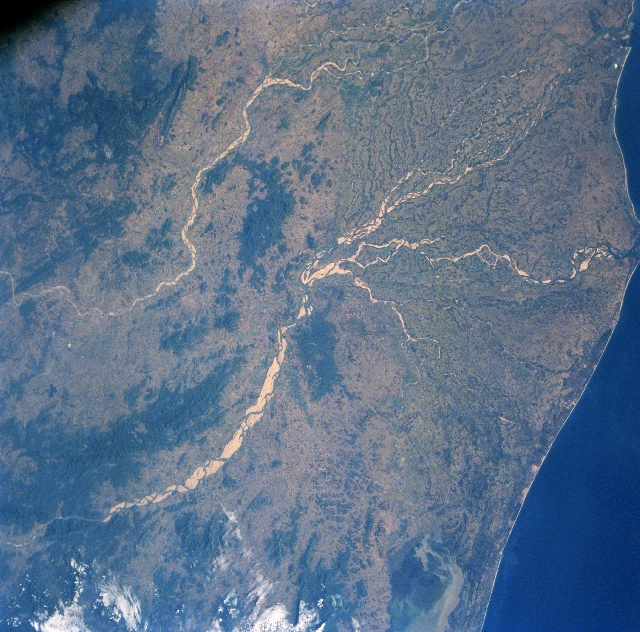
Satellite view of the Mahanadi river delta

Three-quarters of the state is covered in mountain ranges. Deep and broad valleys have been made in them by rivers. These valleys have fertile soil and are densely populated. Odisha also has plateaus and rolling uplands, which have lower elevation than the plateaus. The highest point in the state is Deomali at 1,672 metres in Koraput district. Some other high peaks are: Sinkaram (1,620 m), Golikoda (1,617 m), and Yendrika (1,582 metres).

=== Climate ===
The state experiences four meteorological seasons: winter (January to February), pre-monsoon season (March to May), south-west monsoon season (June to September) and north east monsoon season (October–December). However, locally the year is divided into six traditional seasons (or rutus): Grishma (summer), Barsha (rainy season), Sharata (autumn), Hemanta (dewy),Sheeta(winter season) and Basanta (spring).

Mean Temp and Precipitation of Selected Weather Stations
	Bhubaneswar (1952–2000)			Balasore (1901–2000)			Gopalpur (1901–2000)			Sambalpur (1901–2000)		
	Max (°C)	Min (°C)	Rainfall (mm)	Max (°C)	Min (°C)	Rainfall (mm)	Max (°C)	Min (°C)	Rainfall (mm)	Max (°C)	Min (°C)	Rainfall (mm)
January	28.5	15.5	13.1	27.0	13.9	17.0	27.2	16.9	11.0	27.6	12.6	14.2
February	31.6	18.6	25.5	29.5	16.7	36.3	28.9	19.5	23.6	30.1	15.1	28.0
March	35.1	22.3	25.2	33.7	21.0	39.4	30.7	22.6	18.1	35.0	19.0	20.9
April	37.2	25.1	30.8	36.0	24.4	54.8	31.2	25.0	20.3	39.3	23.5	14.2
May	37.5	26.5	68.2	36.1	26.0	108.6	32.4	26.7	53.8	41.4	27.0	22.7
June	35.2	26.1	204.9	34.2	26.2	233.4	32.3	26.8	138.1	36.9	26.7	218.9
July	32.0	25.2	326.2	31.8	25.8	297.9	31.0	26.1	174.6	31.1	24.9	459.0
August	31.6	25.1	366.8	31.4	25.8	318.3	31.2	25.9	195.9	30.7	24.8	487.5
September	31.9	24.8	256.3	31.7	25.5	275.8	31.7	25.7	192.0	31.7	24.6	243.5
October	31.7	23.0	190.7	31.3	23.0	184.0	31.4	23.8	237.8	31.7	21.8	56.6
November	30.2	18.8	41.7	29.2	17.8	41.6	29.5	19.7	95.3	29.4	16.2	17.6
December	28.3	15.2	4.9	26.9	13.7	6.5	27.4	16.4	11.4	27.2	12.1	4.8

=== Biodiversity ===
According to a Forest Survey of India report released in 2012, Odisha has 48,903 km^{2} of wild forest, covering 31.41% of the state's total area. The forests are classified into areas of dense forest (7,060 km^{2}), medium dense forest (21,366 km^{2}), open forest (forest without closed canopy; 20,477 km^{2}) and scrub forest or scrubland (4,734 km^{2}). The state also has bamboo forests (10,518 km^{2}) and tidal areas of mangrove swamp (221 km^{2}). The state is gradually losing its wilderness areas to timber smuggling, deforestation, destructive mining, and general urban industrialisation, as well as livestock grazing. There have been attempts at conservation and reforestation.

Due to the climate and good rainfall, Odisha's evergreen and moist forests are uniquely suitable habitats for wild orchids. Around 130 species have been reported from the state. Around 97 of them are found in Mayurbhanj district alone. The Orchid House of the Nandankanan Zoological Park maintains some of these species.

Simlipal National Park is a protected wildlife area and Bengal tiger reserve spread over 2,750 km^{2} of the northern part of Mayurbhanj district. The park has around 1,078 species of plants, including 94 of the aforementioned orchids. The sal is the primary tree species. For fauna, the park is home to around 55 species of mammal, including the Bengal tiger, chital, chousingha, common langur, gaur, Indian elephant, Indian giant squirrel, jungle cat, leopard, muntjac, sambar, small Indian civet and wild boar. There are over 300 species of birds in the park, such as the common hill myna, as well as grey, Indian pied and Malabar pied hornbills. There are also some 60 species of reptiles and amphibians, including the famed king cobra, plus banded krait and tricarinate hill turtle. There is also a mugger crocodile breeding programme in nearby Ramtirtha.

The Chandaka Elephant Sanctuary is a 190 km^{2} protected area near the capital city, Bhubaneswar. However, urban expansion and over-grazing have reduced the forests, driving the herds of elephants to migrate away, as well as increasing human-elephant conflicts, which sometimes results in injury and death (on both sides). Some elephants have died in conflicts with villagers, while some have died during migration after being accidentally electrocuted by power lines or even hit by trains. Outside the protected area, they are killed by ivory poachers. In 2002, there were about 80 elephants, but by 2012, their numbers had been reduced to 20. Many of the animals have migrated toward the Barbara Reserve forest, Chilika, Nayagarh district, and Athagad. Besides elephants, the sanctuary also has leopards, jungle cats and herds of chital.

The Bhitarkanika National Park in Kendrapara district covers 650 km^{2}, of which 150 km^{2} are mangroves. Gahirmatha Beach, in Bhitarkanika, is the world's largest nesting site for olive ridley sea turtles. In 2013, the Indian Coast Guard initiated Operation Oliver to protect the endangered sea turtle population of the region. Other major nesting grounds for the turtle in the state are Rushikulya, in Ganjam district, and the mouth of the Devi river. The Bhitarkanika sanctuary is also noted for its large population of saltwater crocodiles and Asian water monitors, the second-largest lizard species on earth, in addition to axis deer and rhesus macaques. The coastal mangrove environments are home to several types of mudskippers, including the barred, Boddart's blue-spotted and great blue-spotted mudskippers.

In winter, Bhitarkanika is also visited by migratory birds. Among the many species, both resident and migratory, are kingfishers (including black-capped, collared and common kingfishers), herons (such as black-crowned night, grey, purple and striated herons), Indian cormorants, openbill storks, Oriental white ibis, pheasant-tailed jacana, sarus cranes, spotted owlets and white-bellied sea-eagles. The possibly endangered horseshoe crab is also found in this region.

Chilika Lake is a brackish water lagoon on the east coast of Odisha with an area of 1,105 km^{2}. It is connected to the Bay of Bengal by a 35-km-long narrow channel and is a part of the Mahanadi delta. In the dry season, the tides bring in salt water. In the rainy season, the rivers falling into the lagoon decrease its salinity. Birds from places as far as the Caspian Sea, Lake Baikal (and other parts of Russia), Central Asia, Southeast Asia, Ladakh and the Himalayas migrate to the lagoon in winter. Among the waterfowl and wading birds spotted there are Eurasian wigeon, pintail, bar-headed goose, greylag goose, greater flamingo, common mallard and Goliath heron. The lagoon also has a small population of the endangered Irrawaddy dolphins. The state's coastal region has also had sightings of the rare finless porpoise, as well as the more common bottlenose dolphin, humpback dolphin and spinner dolphins in its waters.

Satapada is situated close to the northeast cape of Chilika Lake and the Bay of Bengal. It is famous for dolphin watching in their natural habitat. There is a tiny island en route to watching dolphins, where tourists often take a short stop. Apart from that, this island is also home to tiny red crabs.

According to a census conducted in 2016, there are around 2000 elephants in the state.

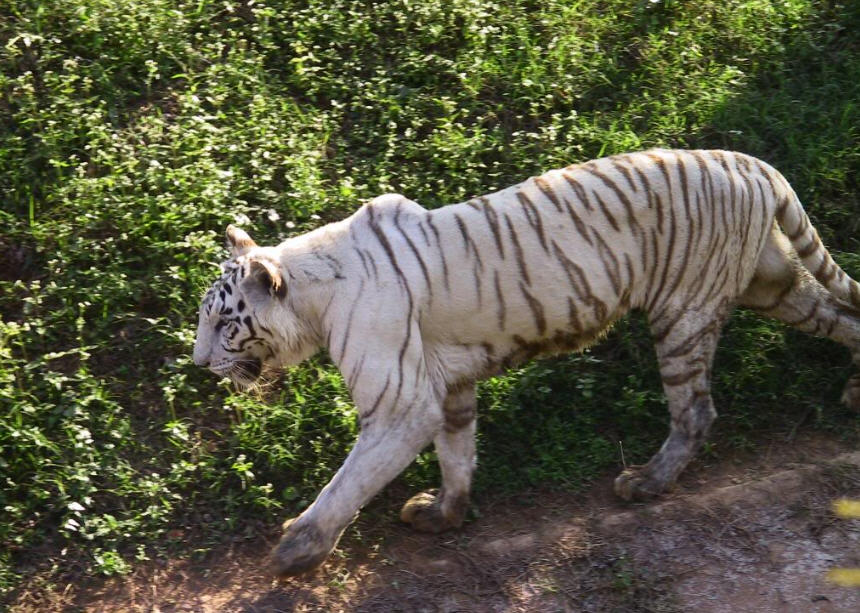
White tiger in the Nandankanan Zoo

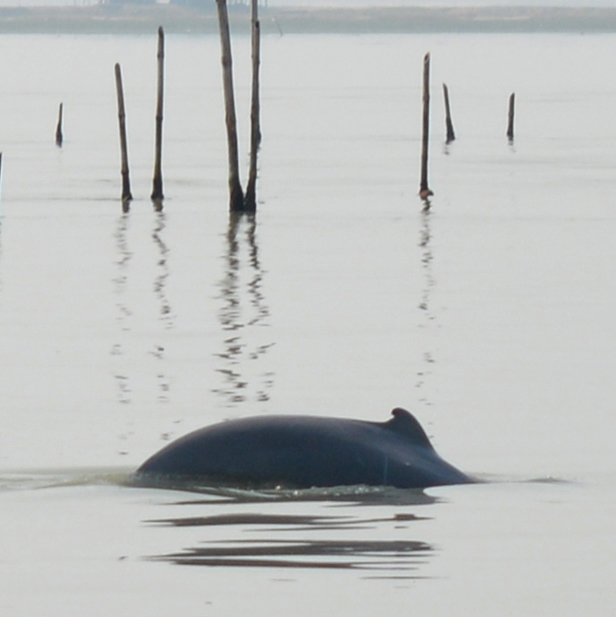
Irrawaddy dolphins can be found in Chilika

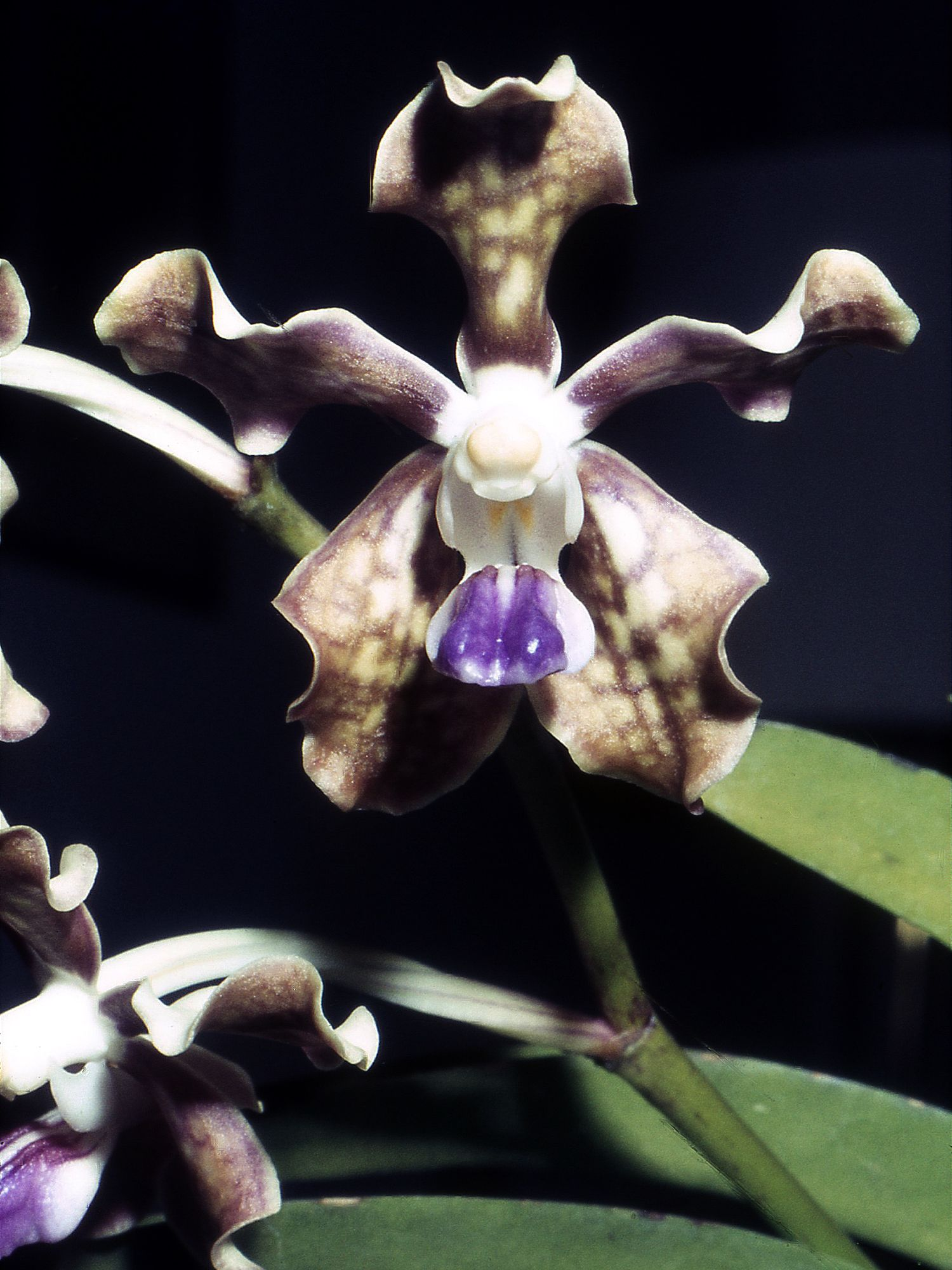
Vanda tessellata, one of the orchids found in Odisha

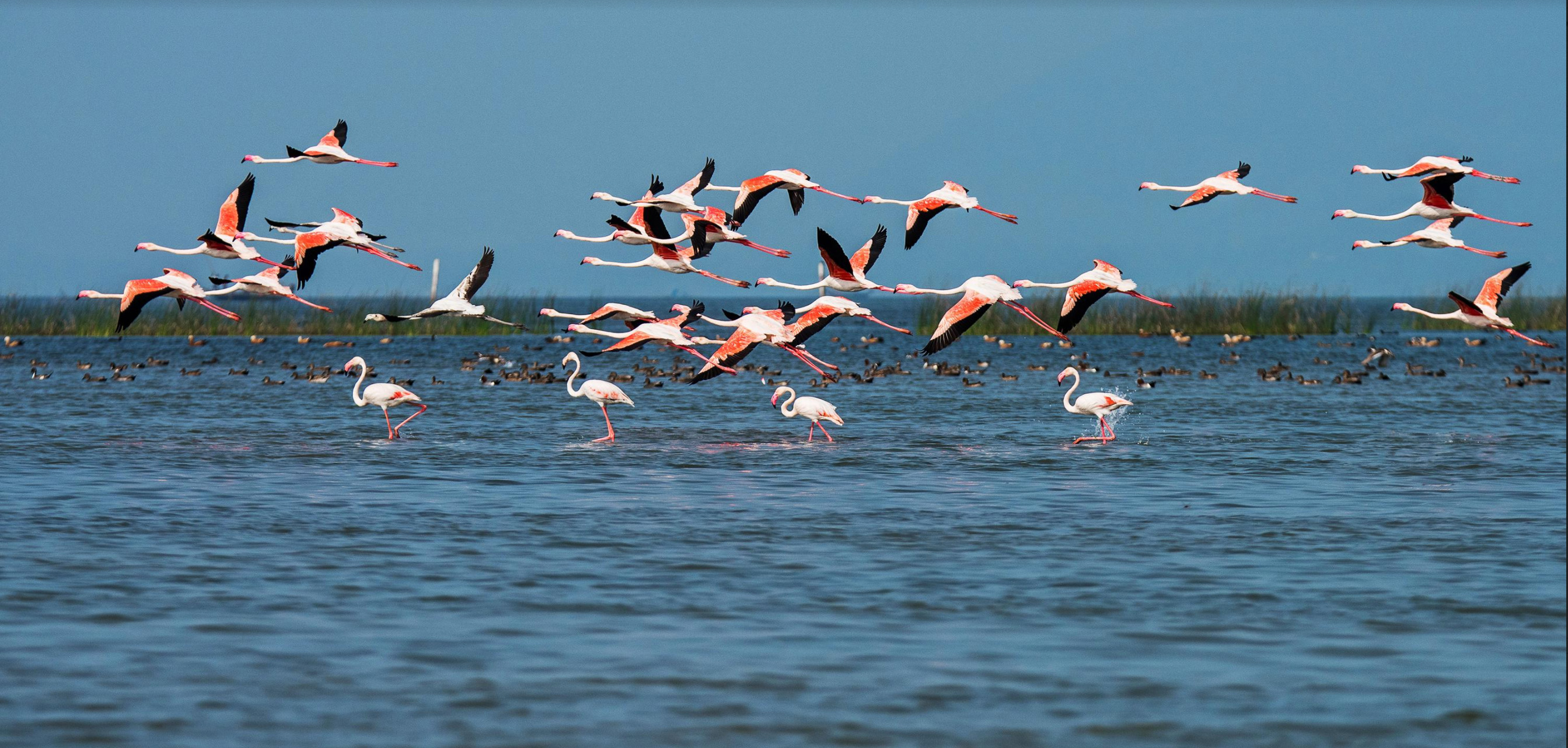
Migratory birds at Chilika Lake

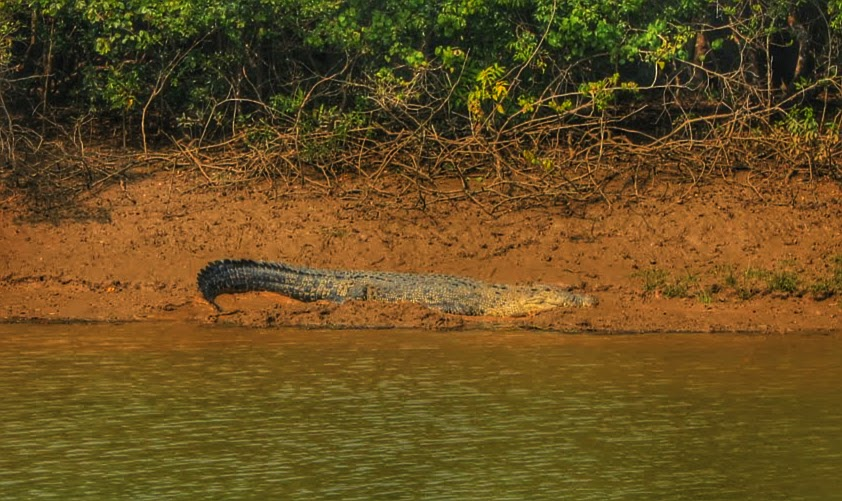
Crocodile in Bhitarkanika National Park

== Government and politics ==
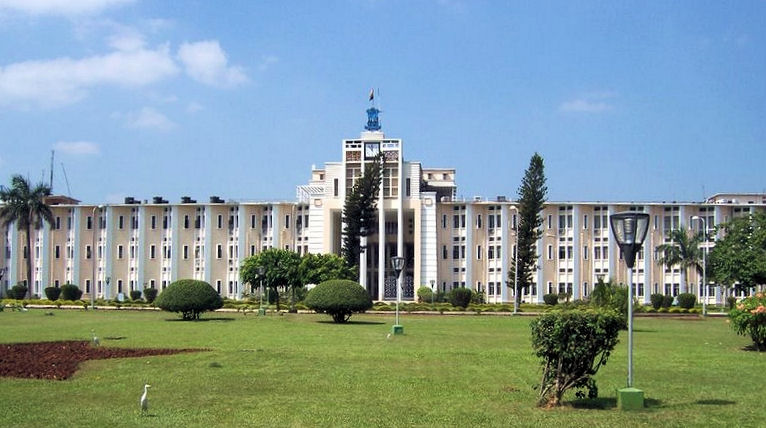
Odisha State Secretariat at Bhubaneswar

All states in India are governed by a parliamentary system of government based on universal adult franchise.

The main parties active in the politics of Odisha are the Biju Janata Dal, the Indian National Congress and Bharatiya Janata Party. Currently, BJP, who won for the first time, formed the government after winning the majority in 2024 Odisha Legislative Assembly election. Mohan Charan Majhi is the 17th Chief Minister of Odisha.

=== Legislative assembly ===
The Odisha state has a unicameral legislature. The Odisha Legislative Assembly consists of 147 elected members, and special office bearers such as the Speaker and Deputy Speaker, who are elected by the members. Assembly meetings are presided over by the Speaker, or by the Deputy Speaker in the Speaker's absence. Executive authority is vested in the Council of Ministers headed by the Chief Minister, although the titular head of government is the Governor of Odisha. The governor is appointed by the President of India. The leader of the party or coalition with a majority in the Legislative Assembly is appointed as the Chief Minister by the governor, and the Council of Ministers are appointed by the governor on the advice of the Chief Minister. The Council of Ministers reports to the Legislative Assembly. The 147 elected representatives are called Members of the Legislative Assembly, or MLAs. One MLA may be nominated from the Anglo-Indian community by the governor. The term of the office is for five years, unless the Assembly is dissolved prior to the completion of the term.

The judiciary is composed of the Odisha High Court, located at Cuttack, and a system of lower courts.

=== Subdivisions ===
Odisha has been divided into 30 districts. These 30 districts have been placed under three different revenue divisions to streamline their governance. The divisions are North, Central and South, with their headquarters at Sambalpur, Cuttack and Berhampur respectively. Each division consists of ten districts and has as its administrative head a Revenue Divisional Commissioner (RDC). The position of the RDC in the administrative hierarchy is that between that of the district administration and the state secretariat. The RDCs report to the Board of Revenue, which is headed by a senior officer of the Indian Administrative Service.

Map of districts of Odisha

Division-wise list of districts
Northern Division (HQ – Sambalpur)	Central Division (HQ – Cuttack)	Southern Division (HQ – Berhampur)
Angul; Balangir; Bargarh; Deogarh; Dhenkanal; Jharsuguda; Kendujhar; Sambalpur; Subarnapur; Sundargarh	Balasore; Bhadrak; Cuttack; Jagatsinghpur; Jajpur; Kendrapada; Khordha; Mayurbhanj; Nayagarh; Puri	Boudh; Gajapati; Ganjam; Kalahandi; Kandhamal; Koraput; Malkangiri; Nabarangpur; Nuapada; Rayagada

Each district is administered by a Collector and district magistrate, who is appointed from the Indian Administrative Service or a very senior officer from Odisha Administrative Service. The collector and district magistrate is responsible for collecting the revenue and maintaining law and order in the district. Each district is separated into sub-divisions, each governed by a sub-collector and sub-divisional magistrate. The sub-divisions are further divided into tahasils. The tahasils are headed by tahasildar. Odisha has 58 sub-divisions, 317 tahasils and 314 blocks. Blocks consists of Panchayats (village councils) and town municipalities.

The capital of the state is Bhubaneswar and the largest city is Cuttack, which also functions as the deputy capital of the state . The other major cities are, Rourkela, Berhampur and Sambalpur. Municipal Corporations in Odisha include Bhubaneswar, Cuttack, Berhampur, Puri, Sambalpur and Rourkela.

Other municipalities of Odisha include Angul, Asika, Balangir, Balasore, Barbil, Bargarh, Baripada, Basudevpur, Belpahar, Bhadrak, Bhanjanagar, Bhawanipatna, Biramitrapur, Boudh, Brajarajnagar, Byasanagar, Chhatrapur, Deogarh, Dhamra, Dhenkanal, Gopalpur, Gunupur, Hinjilicut, Jagatsinghpur, Jajpur, Jeypore, Jharsuguda, Joda, Kendrapara, Kendujhar, Khordha, Konark, Koraput, Malkangiri, Nabarangpur, Nayagarh, Nuapada, Paradeep, Paralakhemundi, Phulbani, Rajgangpur, Rayagada, Sonepur, Sundargarh, Talcher, Titilagarh, Karanjia, Chatrapur, Asika, Kantabanji, Nimapada, Baudhgarh, and Umerkote.

Largest cities or towns in Odisha As of the 2011 Census
Rank	Name	District	Pop.
1	Cuttack	Cuttack	921,321
2	Bhubaneswar	Khordha	881,988
3	Rourkela	Sundargarh	552,970
4	Brahmapur	Ganjam	355,823
5	Sambalpur	Sambalpur	270,331
6	Puri	Puri	201,026
7	Balasore	Balasore	144,373
8	Bhadrak	Bhadrak	121,338
9	Baripada	Mayurbhanj	116,874
10	Balangir	Balangir	98,238

Auxiliary authorities known as panchayats, for which local body elections are regularly held, govern local affairs in rural areas.

== Economy ==
=== Macro-economic trend ===
Odisha is experiencing a rapid economic growth post-Covid. The impressive growth in gross domestic product of the state has been reported by the Ministry of Statistics and Programme Implementation. Odisha's growth rate is above the national average. The central Government's Urban Development Ministry has recently announced the names of 20 cities selected to be developed as smart cities. The state capital Bhubaneswar is the first city in the list of smart Cities released in January 2016, a pet project of the Indian Government. The announcement also marked with sanction of Rs 508.02 billion over the five years for development.

=== Industrial development ===
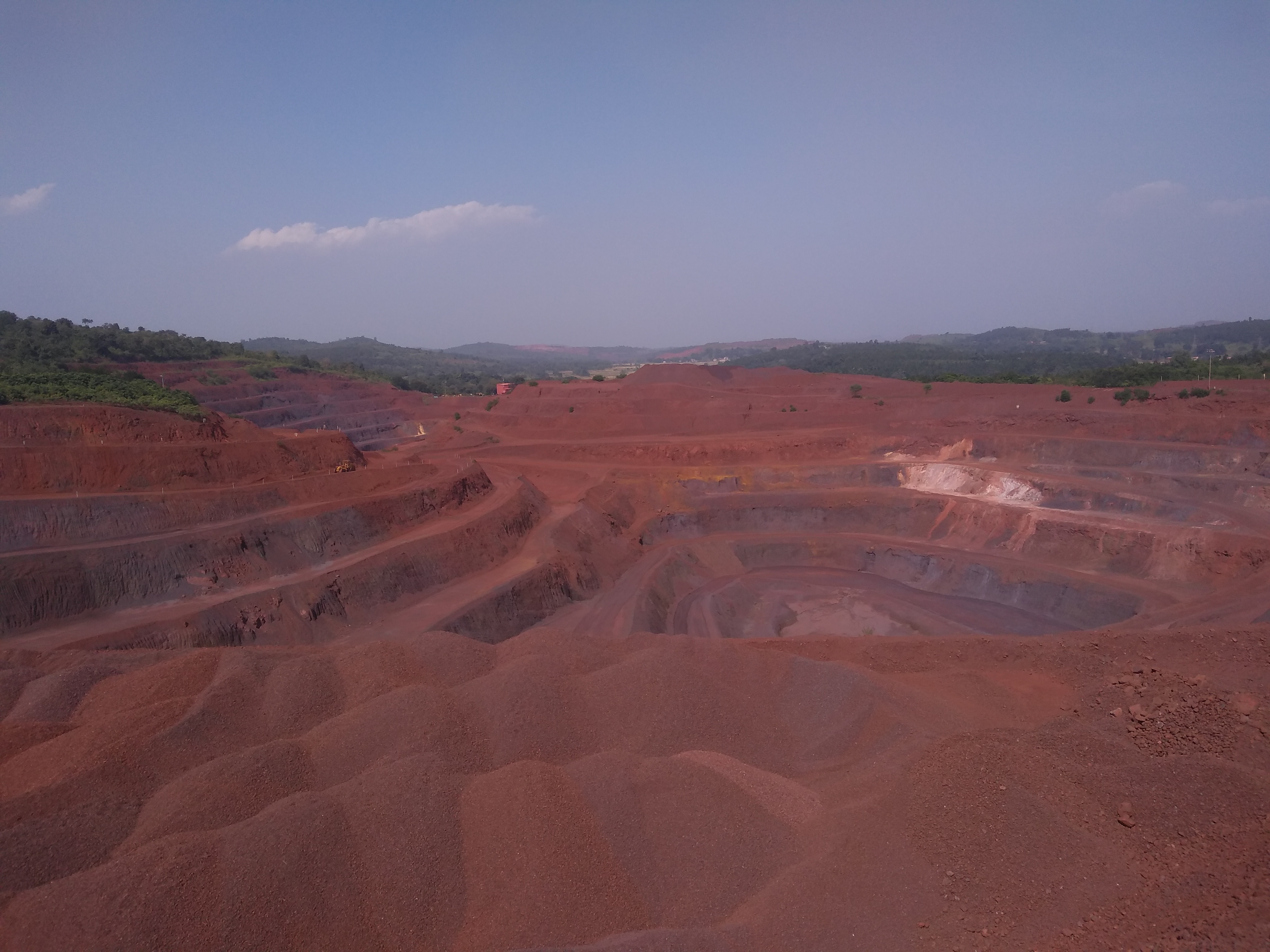
One of the iron ore mines in Keonjhar district

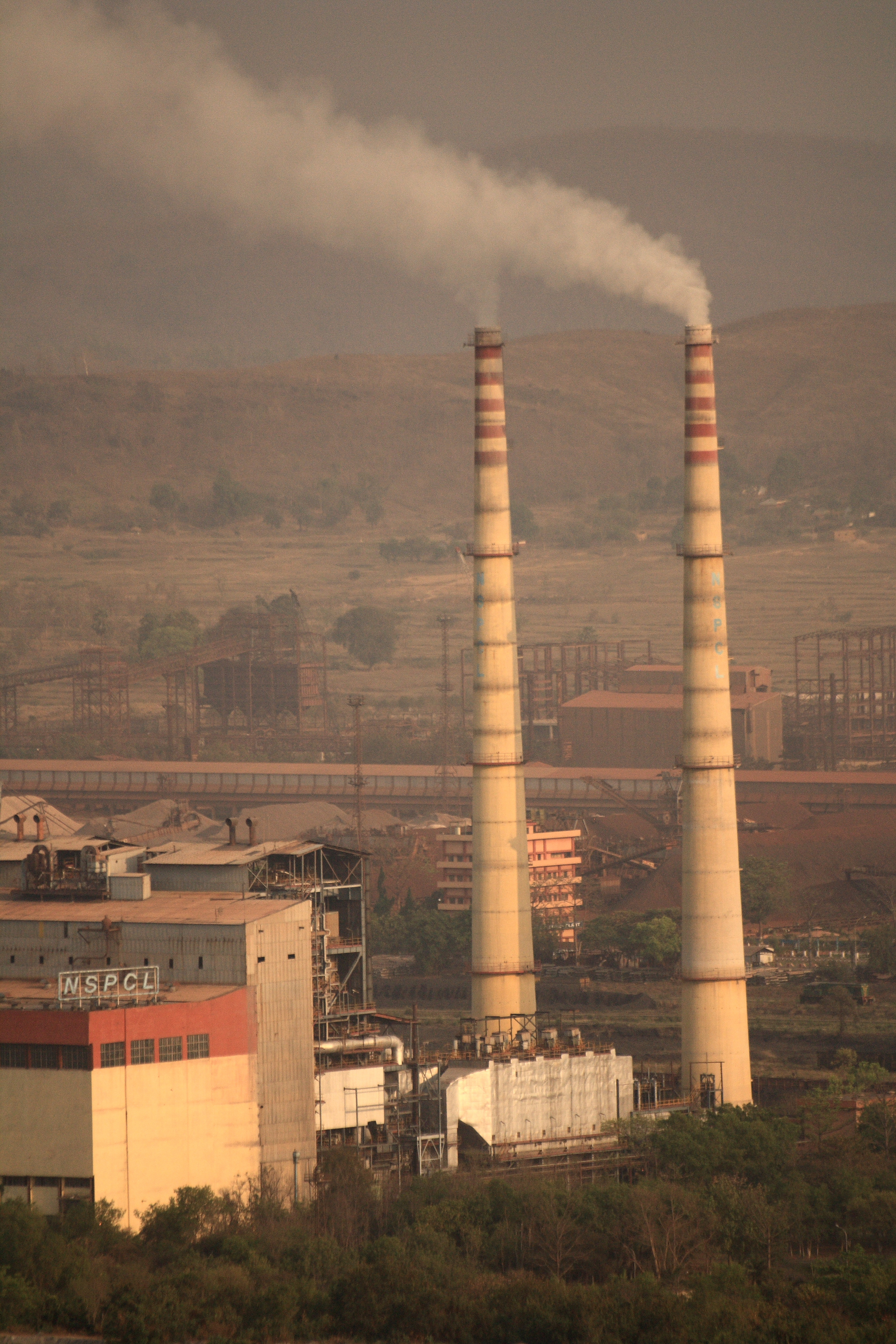
Rourkela Steel Plant

Odisha has abundant natural resources and a large coastline. Odisha has emerged as the most preferred destination for overseas investors with investment proposals. It contains a fifth of India's coal, a quarter of its iron ore, a third of its bauxite reserves and most of the chromite.

Rourkela Steel Plant was the first integrated steel plant in the public sector in India, built with collaboration of Germany.

Arcelor-Mittal has also announced plans to invest in another mega steel project amounting to $10 billion. Russian major Magnitogorsk Iron and Steel Company (MMK) plans to set up a 10 MT steel plant in Odisha, too. Nippon Steel Corporation has recently announced to set up their own plants, one of which will be the world's largest and most advanced steel plant in Odisha, with a production capacity of 30 MT annually. Bandhabahal is a major area of open cast coal mines in Odisha. The state is attracting an unprecedented amount of investment in aluminium, coal-based power plants, petrochemicals, and information technology as well. In power generation, Reliance Power (Anil Ambani Group) is putting up the world's largest power plant with an investment of US$13 billion at Hirma in Jharsuguda district.

In 2009 Odisha was the second top domestic investment destination with Gujarat first and Andhra Pradesh in third place according to an analysis of ASSOCHAM Investment Meter (AIM) study on corporate investments. Odisha's share was 12.6 per cent in total investment in the country. It received an investment proposal worth ₹2.01 trillion (equivalent to ₹4.9 trillion or US$53 billion in 2026) in 2010. Steel and power were among the sectors which attracted maximum investments in the state.

The recently concluded Make in Odisha Conclave 2022 saw the state generate investment proposals worth ₹10.5 trillion with an employment potential for 10,37,701 people. Out of the total investment proposals received, the metals, ancillary and downstream sectors fetched ₹5.50 lakhs crore (trillion), power, green energy, and renewable energy sector fetched ₹2.38 trillion, and chemicals-petrochemicals and logistics-infrastructure sector attracted ₹76,000 crores and ₹1.20 trillion, respectively. Odisha has the potential to become a trillion-dollar economy by 2030.

=== Transportation ===
Odisha has a network of roads, railways, airports and seaports. Bhubaneswar is well connected by air, rail and road with the rest of India. Some highways are getting expanded to four lanes. Odisha Government Plans Mega Metro Rail Project to Connect Puri and Bhubaneswar The metro rail proposal was given to connect trains between Puri- Bhubaneswar – Cuttack. The Odisha government has planned a new Expressway that will connect Biju Patnaik International Airport at Bhubaneswar with the proposed Shri Jagannath International Airport at Puri.

=== Air ===
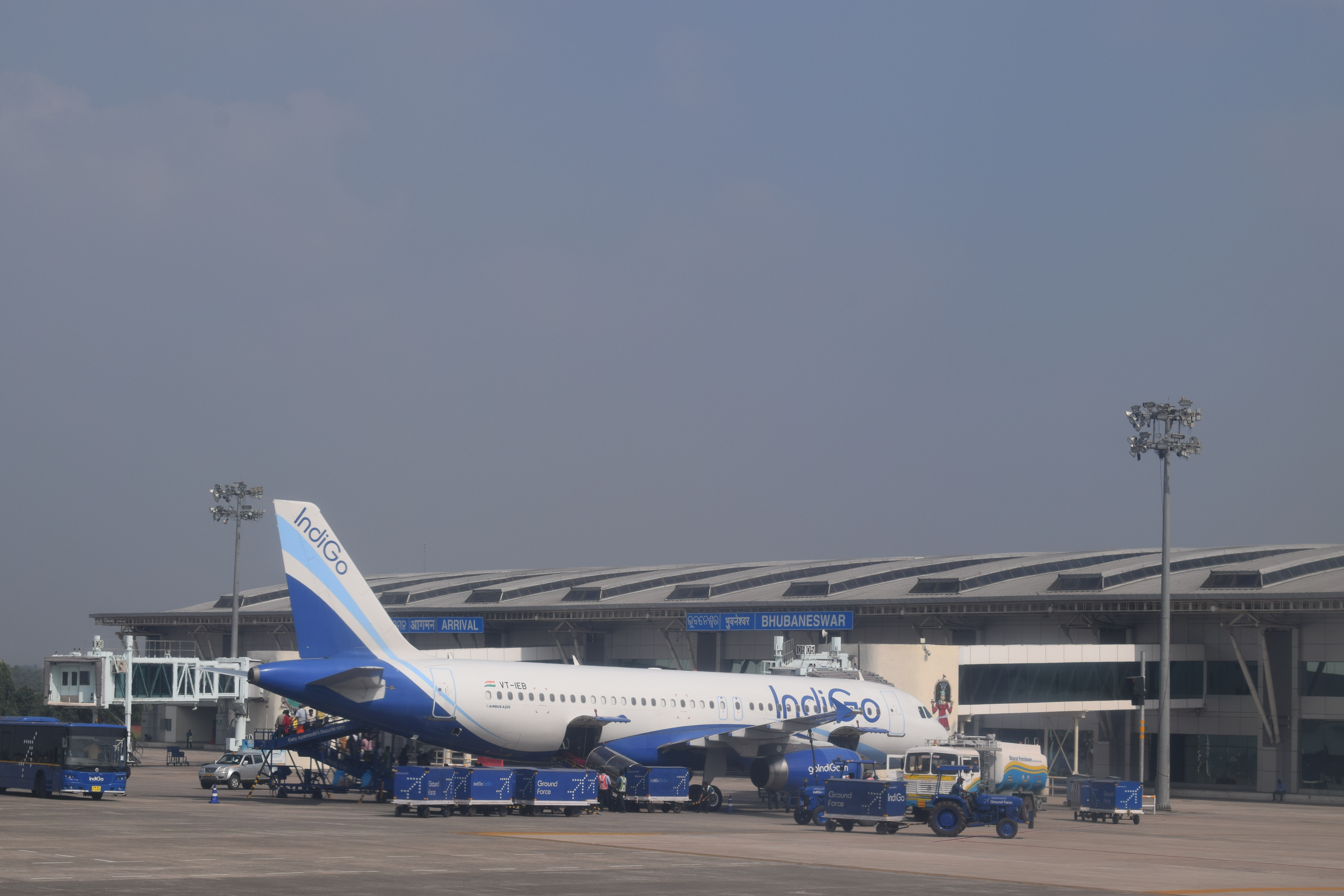
Biju Patnaik International Airport, Bhubaneswar

Odisha has a total of three operational airports, 16 airstrips and 16 helipads. The airport at Jharsuguda was upgraded to a full-fledged domestic airport in May 2018. Rourkela Airport became operational in December 2022.The Dhamra Port Company Limited plans to build Dhamra Airport 20 km from Dhamra Port.

- Bhubaneswar – Biju Patnaik International Airport
- Jeypore – Jeypore Airport
- Jharsuguda – Veer Surendra Sai Airport
- Rourkela – Rourkela Airport
- Berhampur – Rangeilunda Airport
- Bhawanipatna - Utkela Airport

=== Seaports ===
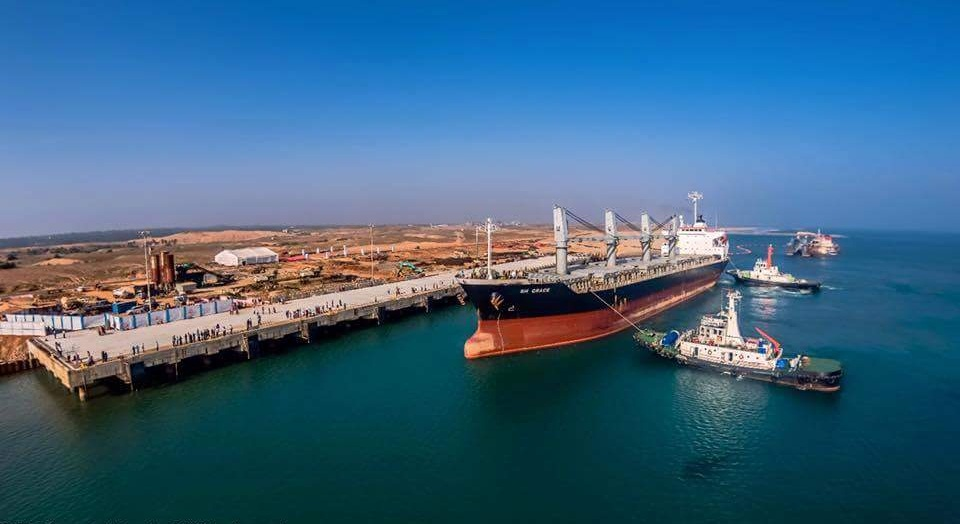
Gopalpur port

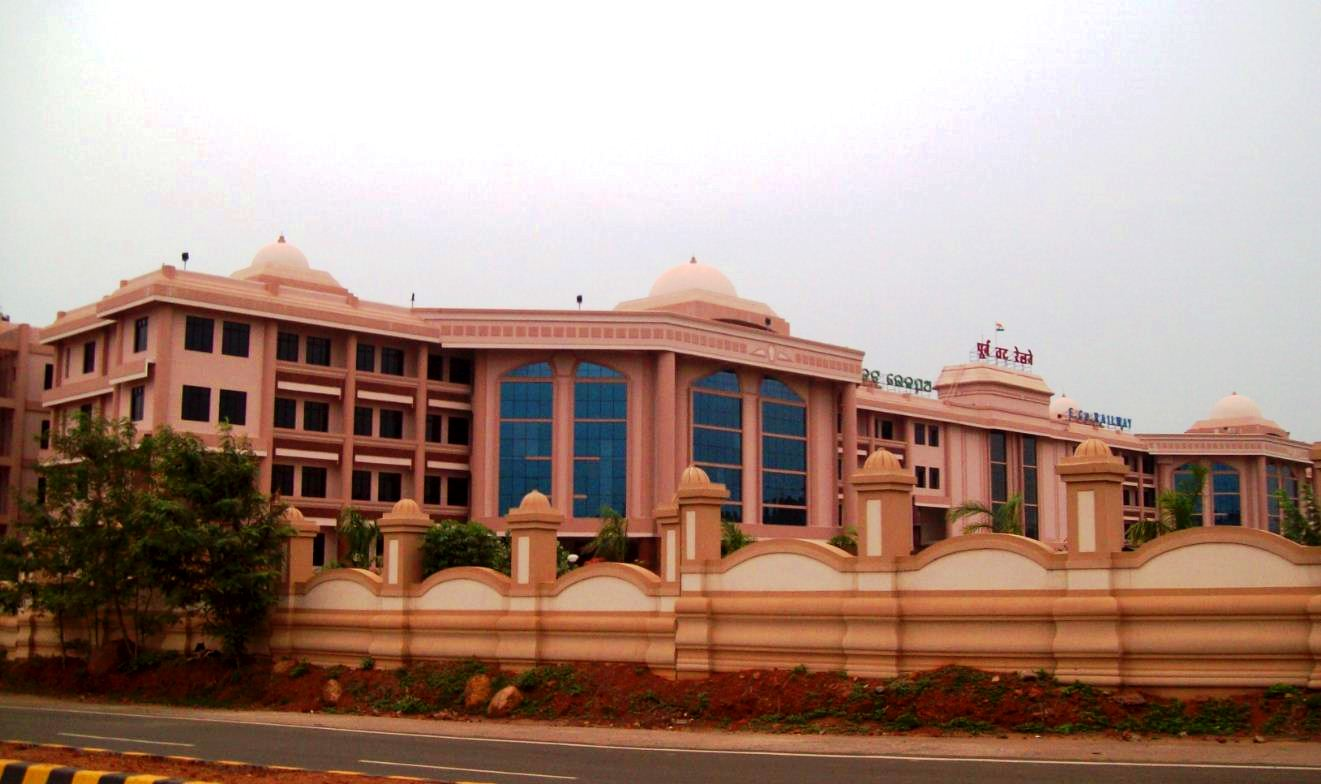
East Coast Railway headquarters, Bhubaneswar

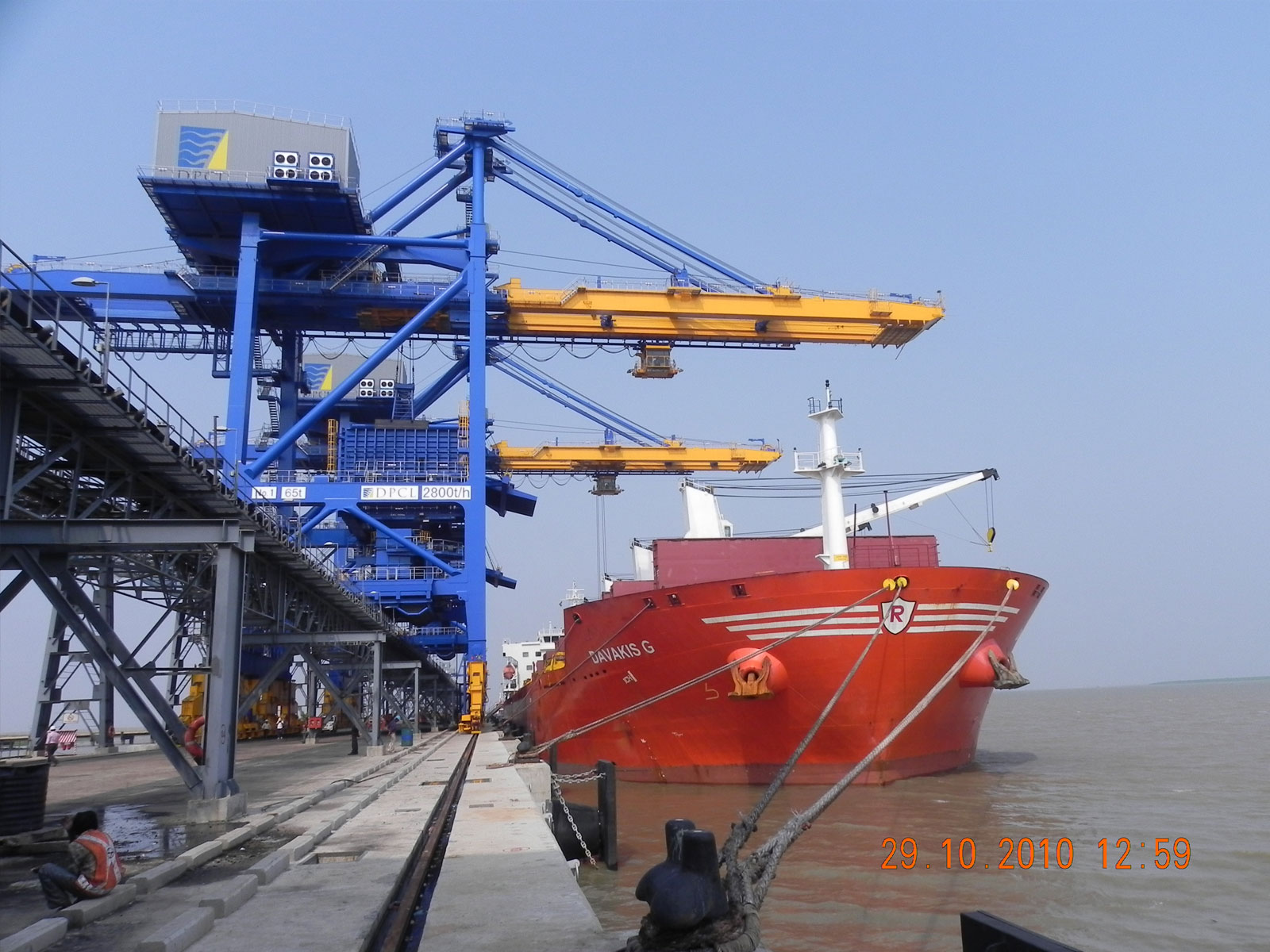
Dhamra Port

Odisha has a coastline of 485 kilometres (301 mi). It has one major port at Paradip and a few minor ports. some of them are:

- Port of Dhamara
- Port of Gopalpur
- Port of Paradip
- Port of Subarnarekha

=== Railways ===
Major cities of Odisha are well connected to all the major cities of India by direct daily trains and weekly trains. Most of the railway network in Odisha lies under the jurisdiction of the East Coast Railway (ECoR) with headquarters at Bhubaneswar and some parts under South Eastern Railway and South East Central Railway.

== Demographics ==
Historical population
Year	Pop.	±%
1901	10,302,917	—
1911	11,378,875	+10.4%
1921	11,158,586	−1.9%
1931	12,491,056	+11.9%
1941	13,767,988	+10.2%
1951	14,645,946	+6.4%
1961	17,548,846	+19.8%
1971	21,944,615	+25.0%
1981	26,370,271	+20.2%
1991	31,659,736	+20.1%
2001	36,804,660	+16.3%
2011	41,974,218	+14.0%
Source: Census of India

=== Population ===
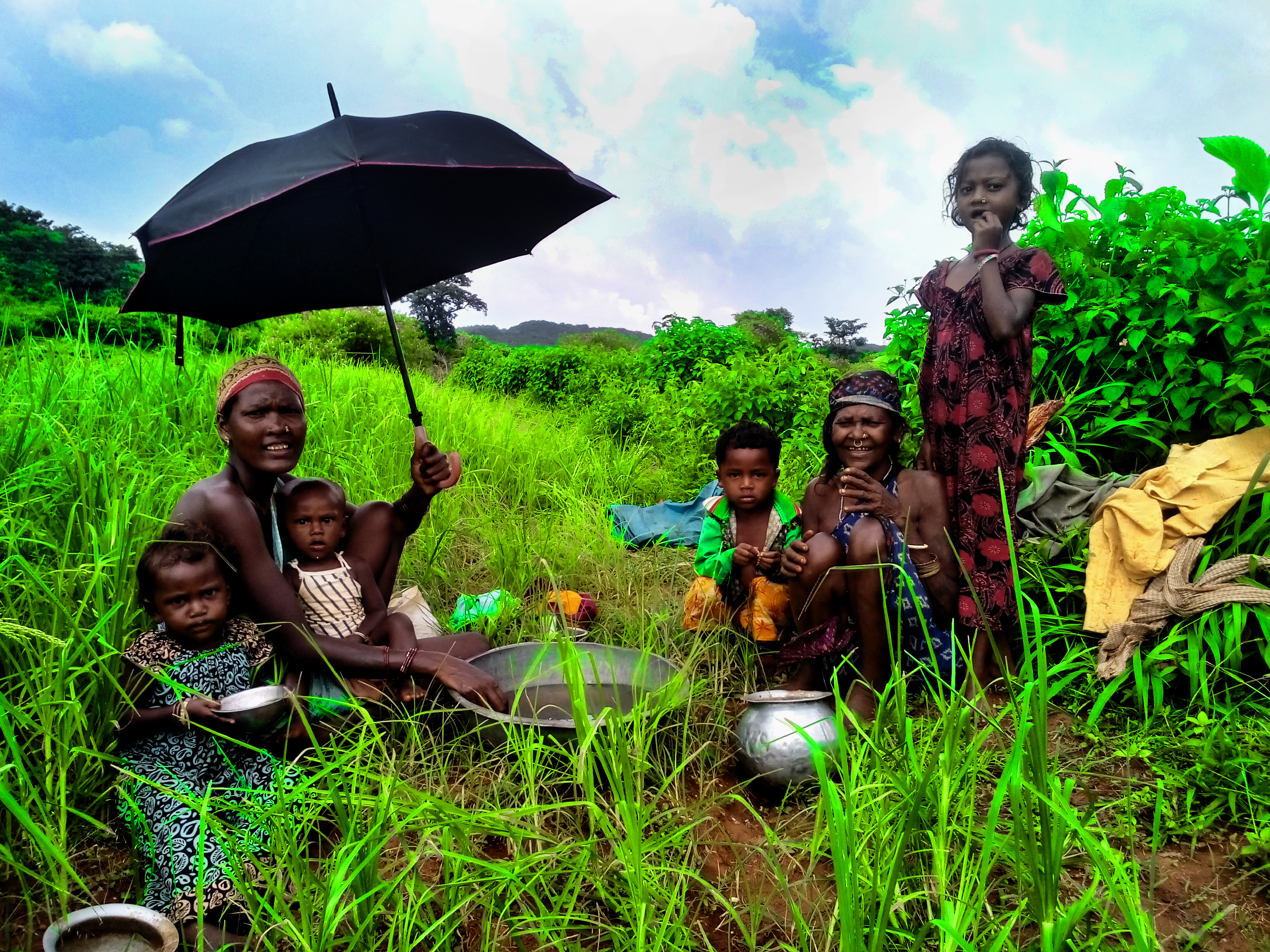
Tribal people of Koraput, Odisha

According to the 2011 census of India, Odisha accounted for approximately 3% of India's total population. The state had a population of 41,974,218, with 21,212,136 males (50.54%) and 20,762,082 females (49.46%), resulting in a sex ratio of 978 females per 1,000 males. This marked a growth rate of 13.97% during the 2001-2011 period, a decline from 16.25% in the previous decade (1991-2001). The population density stood at 269 people per square kilometre, with Ganjam district having the highest population among all districts in Odisha. In contrast, Debagarh district has the lowest population. The population in the age group of 0–6 years comprised 12% of the total population, with a child sex ratio of 934 females for every 1,000 males in this age group. Additionally, Scheduled Castes (SC) constituted a population of 7.2 million, making up 16.5% of the total population, while Scheduled Tribes (ST) accounted for 9.6 million, representing 22.1% of the population.

=== Literacy and Socioeconomic Indicators ===
According to the 2011 Census, Odisha's overall literacy rate is 72.87%. Male literacy stands at 81.59%, while female literacy is recorded at 64.01%. Odisha's literacy rate is slightly below the national average of 74.04%. Literacy rates vary within the state, with Khordha district having the highest literacy rate at 86.88%, while Nabarangpur has the lowest at 46.43%. In rural areas, the average literacy rate is 70.22%, compared to 85.57% in urban areas. Among the Scheduled Tribe population, the literacy rate is 52.24%.

In terms of poverty, Odisha had a poverty rate of 57.15% in 2004–2005, nearly double the national average of 26.10% at the time. However, since 2005, the state has made significant progress, reducing the poverty rate by 24.6 percentage points, with the current estimate at 32.6%.

=== Health and Vital Statistics ===
Data from 1996–2001 indicated that the state’s life expectancy was 61.64 years, slightly above the national average. Odisha also records a birth rate of 23.2 per 1,000 people annually, a death rate of 9.1 per 1,000, an infant mortality rate of 65 per 1,000 live births. In 2011-2013, Odisha recorded a maternal mortality ratio (MMR) of 222 per 100,000 live births, according to a report by NITI Aayog. As of 2018, Odisha’s Human Development Index (HDI) stands at 0.606. The Total Fertility Rate (TFR) in Odisha declined from 2.1 in 2015-16 to 1.8 in 2020-21, paralleling the national trend, which saw a decrease from 2.2 to 2.0 during the same period.

With a cumulative score of 67.8, Odisha tops the ranking in fiscal health index 2025.

=== Religion ===
Religion in Odisha (2011)
1. Hindu (93.6%)
2. Christian (2.77%)
3. Muslim (2.17%)
4. Other religion (1.14%)
5. Sikh (0.05%)
6. Buddhist (0.03%)
7. Jain (0.02%)
8. No religion (0.18%)

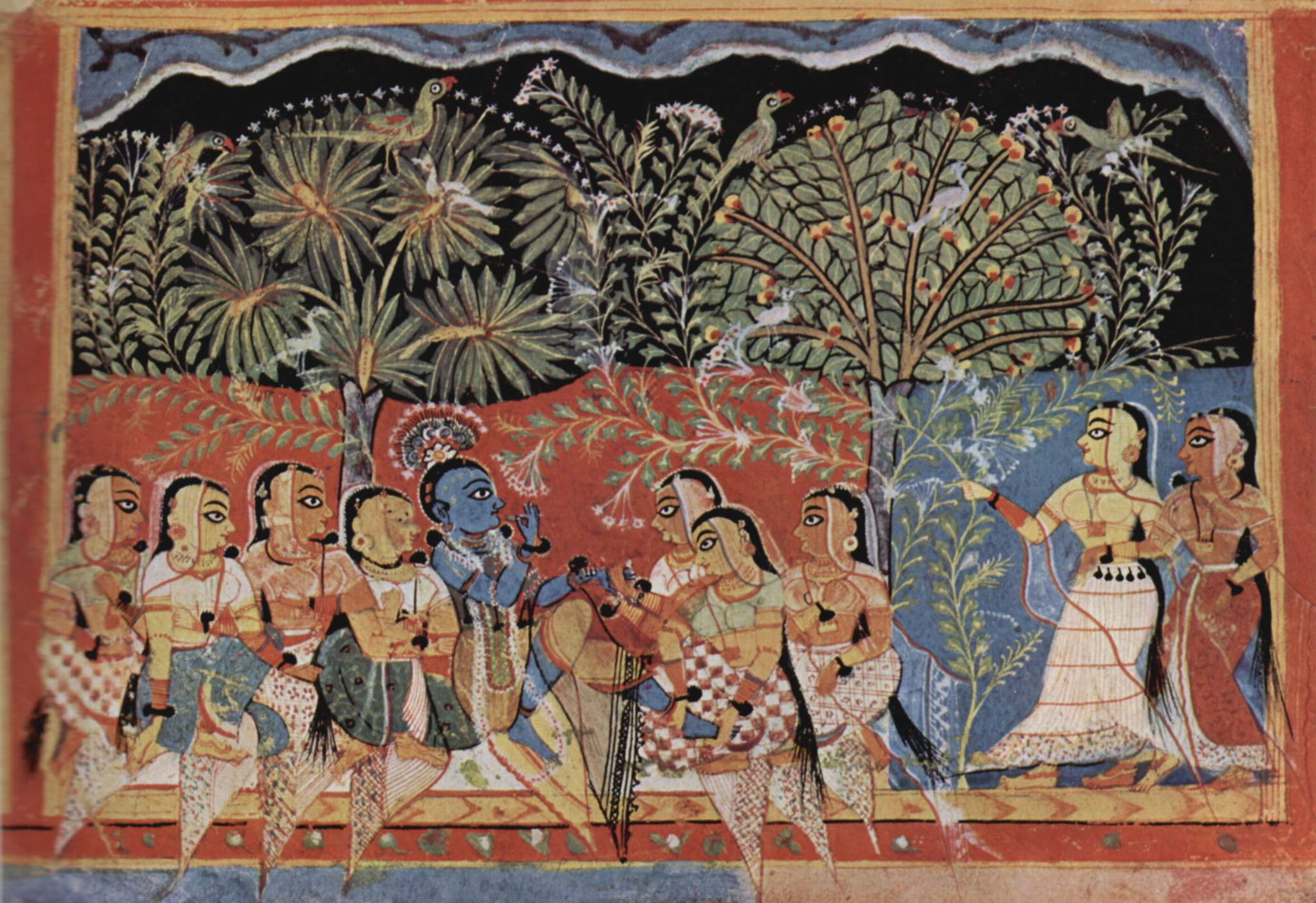
Gita Govinda

Based on the 2011 Census, Odisha has a predominantly Hindu population, with 93.63% adhering to Hinduism. The state is home to several prominent Hindu pilgrimage sites, including Jagannath Puri, known for the Jagannath Temple, and the Lingaraj Temple in Bhubaneswar, which attract devotees from across India and beyond. Christianity is the second-largest religion at 2.77%, followed by Islam at 2.17%. Smaller communities include Sikhs (0.05%), Jains (0.02%), and Buddhists (0.03%). Additionally, 1.14% of the population practices other religions, with Sarna being one of the prominent indigenous faiths, particularly among tribal communities. A small segment, 0.18%, did not state their religious affiliation.

==== Decadal variations among religious groups ====
Religious composition of Odisha
Religion	1951		1961		1971		1981		1991		2001		2011	
Religion	Population	%	Population	%	Population	%	Population	%	Population	%	Population	%	Population	%
Hinduism	14,368,411	98.11	17,123,194	97.57	21,121,056	96.25	25,161,725	95.42	29,971,257	94.67	34,726,129	94.35	39,300,341	93.63
Islam	176,338	1.20	215,319	1.23	326,507	1.49	422,266	1.60	577,775	1.82	761,985	2.07	911,670	2.17
Christianity	141,934	0.97	201,017	1.15	378,888	1.73	480,426	1.82	666,220	2.10	897,861	2.44	1,161,708	2.77
Sikhism	4,163	0.03	5,030	0.03	10,204	0.04	14,270	0.05	17,296	0.05	17,492	0.05	21,991	0.05
Jainism	1,248	0.01	2,295	0.01	6,521	0.03	6,642	0.03	6,302	0.02	9,154	0.02	9,420	0.02
Buddhism	969	0.01	454	0.00	8,462	0.04	8,028	0.03	9,153	0.03	9,863	0.03	13,852	0.03
ORP	2,883	0.02	1,537	0.01	91,859	0.42	273,596	1.04	397,798	1.26	361,981	0.98	478,317	1.14
Not Stated	—N/a	—N/a	1,537	0.01	1,118	0.01	3,318	0.01	13,935	0.04	20,195	0.05	76,919	0.18
Total	14,645,946	100	17,548,846	100	21,944,615	100	26,370,271	100	31,659,736	100	36,804,660	100	41,974,218	100
Source: Census of India

=== Languages ===
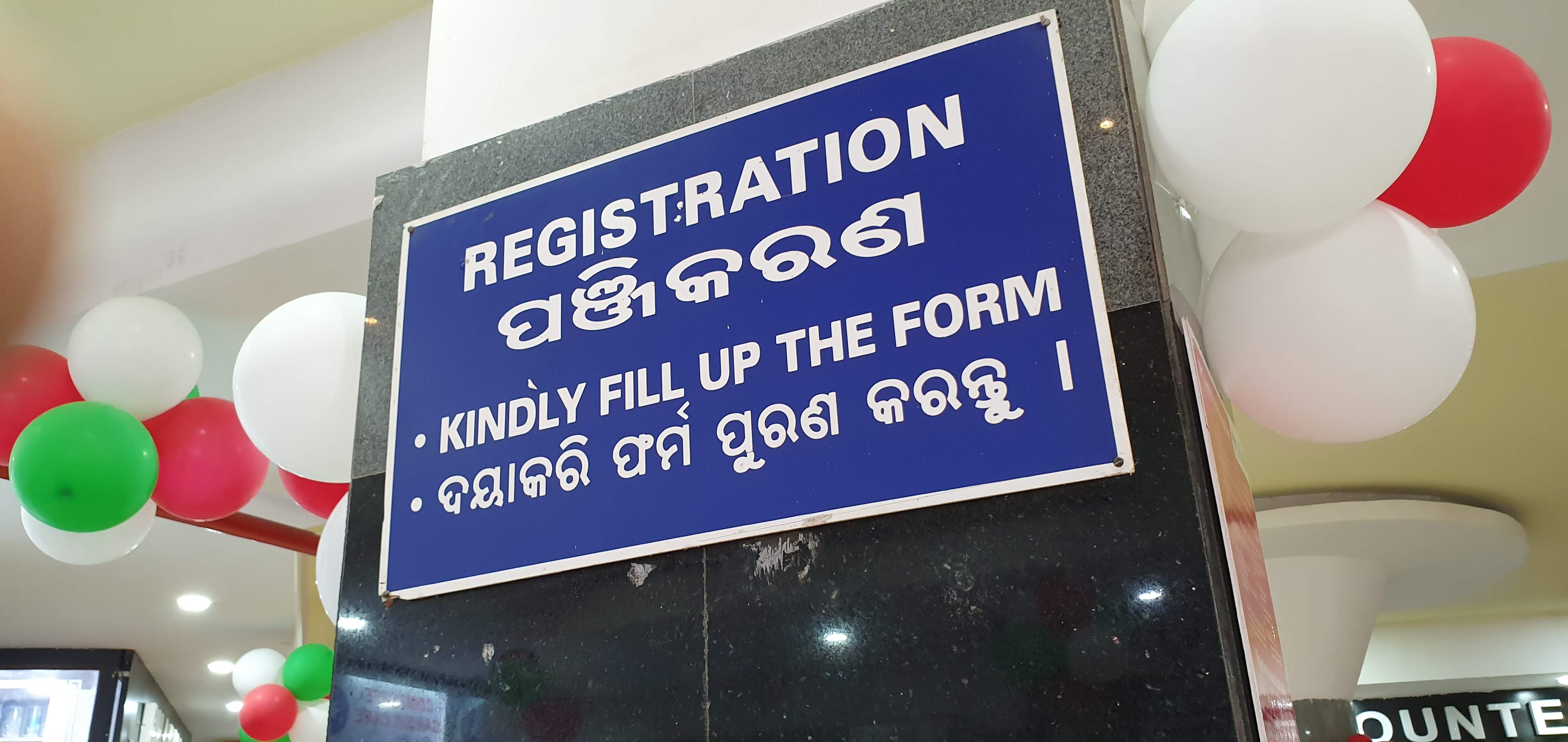
Bilingual signboard in English and Odia

Languages of Odisha (2011)
1. Odia (82.7%)
2. Kui (2.24%)
3. Santali (2.06%)
4. Urdu (1.60%)
5. Telugu (1.59%)
6. Hindi (1.23%)
7. Bengali (1.20%)
8. Mundari (1.09%)
9. Others (6.29%)

Linguistic maps of Odisha

Odia is the official language of Odisha and is spoken by 82.70% of the population according to the 2011 Census of India. It is also one of the classical languages of India. English is the official language of correspondence between the state government and the union of India. Spoken Odia is not homogeneous as one can find different dialects spoken across the state. Some of the major dialects found inside the state are Sambalpuri, Cuttacki, Sundargarhi, Baleswari, Ganjami, Desiya, Kalahandia and Phulbani. The standard language is based on the Cuttacki dialect. In addition to Odia, significant populations of people speaking other major Indian languages like Hindi, Telugu, Urdu and Bengali are also found in the state, mainly in cities.

The different tribal (Adivasi) communities who mostly reside in western and southern Odisha have their own languages belonging to Munda and Dravidian family of languages. Some of these major tribal languages are Santali, Kui, Mundari and Ho. Due to increasing contact with outsiders, migration and socioeconomic reasons, many of these indigenous languages are slowly becoming extinct or are on the verge of extinction.

The Odisha Sahitya Academy Award was established in 1957 to actively develop Odia language and literature. The Odisha government launched a portal in 2018 to promote Odia language and literature.

== Education ==
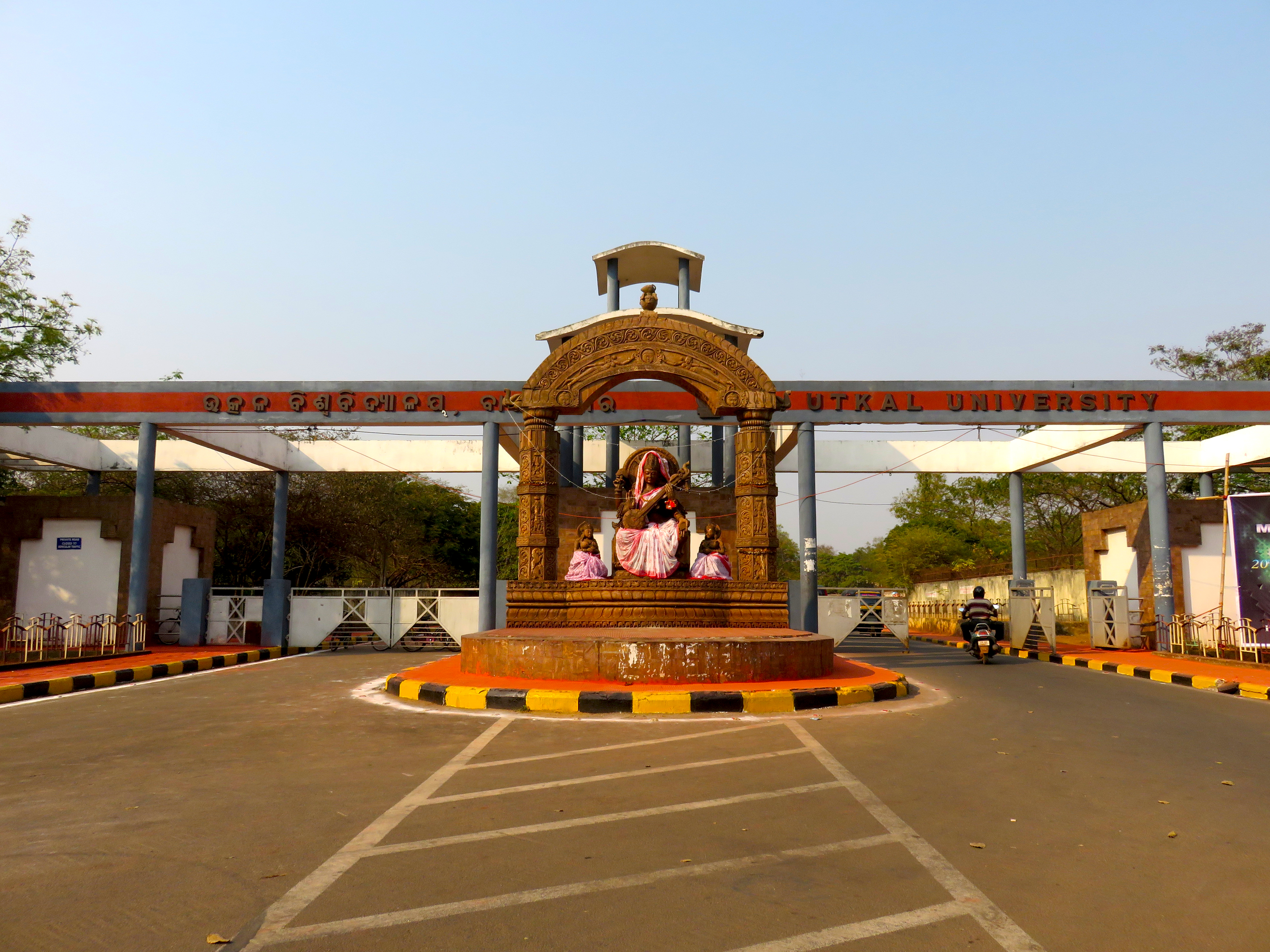
Utkal University main gate

Entry to various institutes of higher education especially into engineering degrees is through a centralised Odisha Joint Entrance Examination, conducted by the Biju Patnaik University of Technology (BPUT), Rourkela, since 2003, where seats are provided according to order of merit. Few of the engineering institutes enroll students by through Joint Entrance Examination. For medical courses, there is a corresponding National Eligibility Cum Entrance Test.

== Culture ==
Odisha is home to several Hindu figures. Sant Bhima Bhoi was a leader of the Mahima sect. Sarala Das, a Hindu Khandayat, was the translator of the epic Mahabharata into Odia. Chaitanya Das was a Buddhistic-Vaishnava and writer of the Nirguna Mahatmya. Jayadeva was the author of the Gita Govinda.

The Odisha Temple Authorisation Act of 1948 empowered the government of Odisha to open temples for all Hindus, including Dalits.

Perhaps the oldest scripture of Odisha is the Madala Panji from the Puri Temple believed from 1042 AD. Famous Hindu Odia scripture includes the 16th-century Bhagabata of Jagannatha Dasa. In the modern times Madhusudan Rao was a major Odia writer, who was a Brahmo Samajist and shaped modern Odia literature at the start of the 20th century.

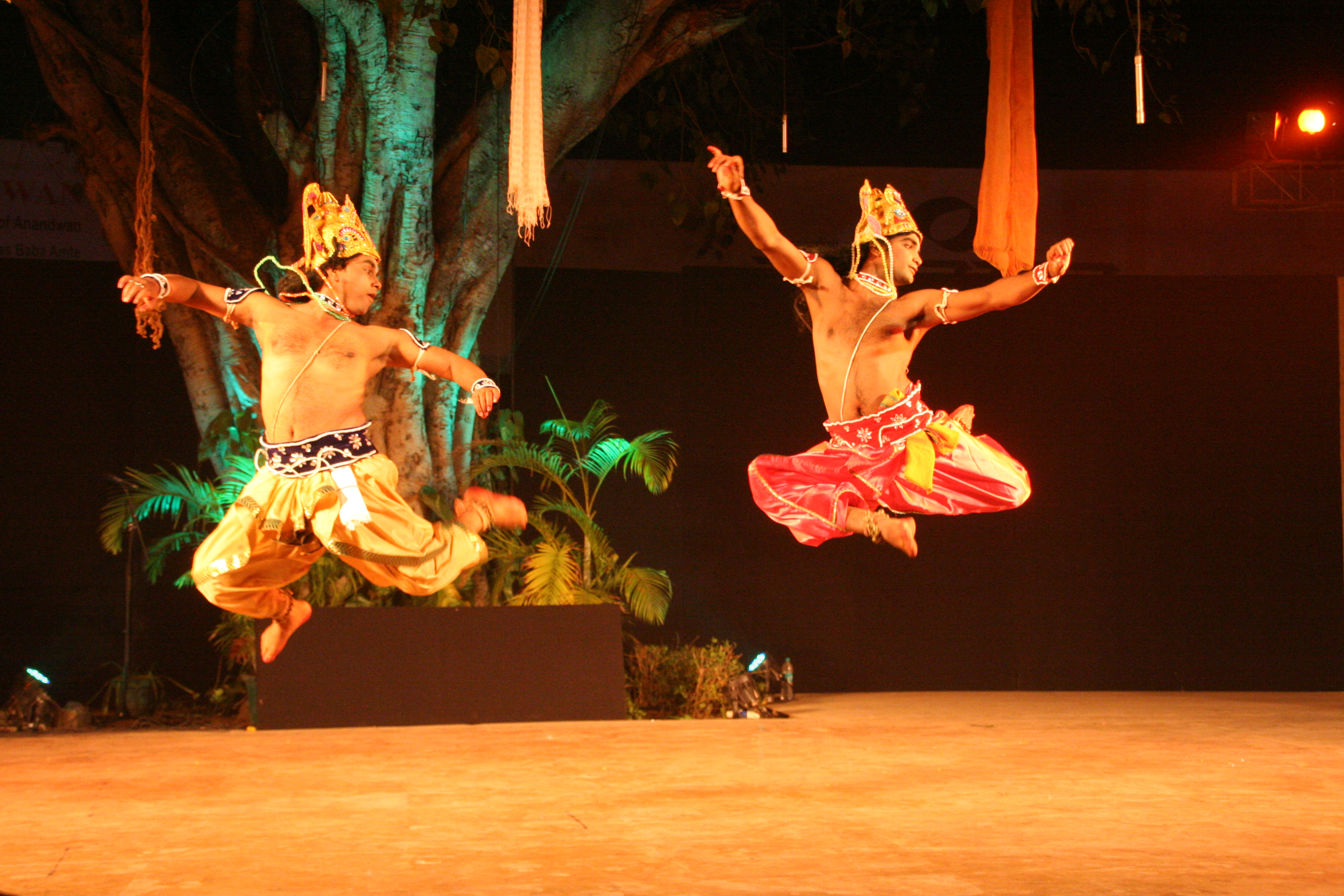
Mayurbhanj Chhau

=== Cuisine ===
Odisha has a culinary tradition spanning centuries. The kitchen of the Shri Jagannath Temple, Puri is reputed to be the largest in the world, with 1,000 chefs, working around 752 wood-burning clay hearths called chulas, to feed over 10,000 people each day.

The syrupy dessert Pahala rasagola made in Odisha is known throughout the world. Chhenapoda is another major Odisha sweet cuisine, which originated in Nayagarh. Dalma (a mix of dal and selected vegetables) is widely known cuisine, better served with ghee.

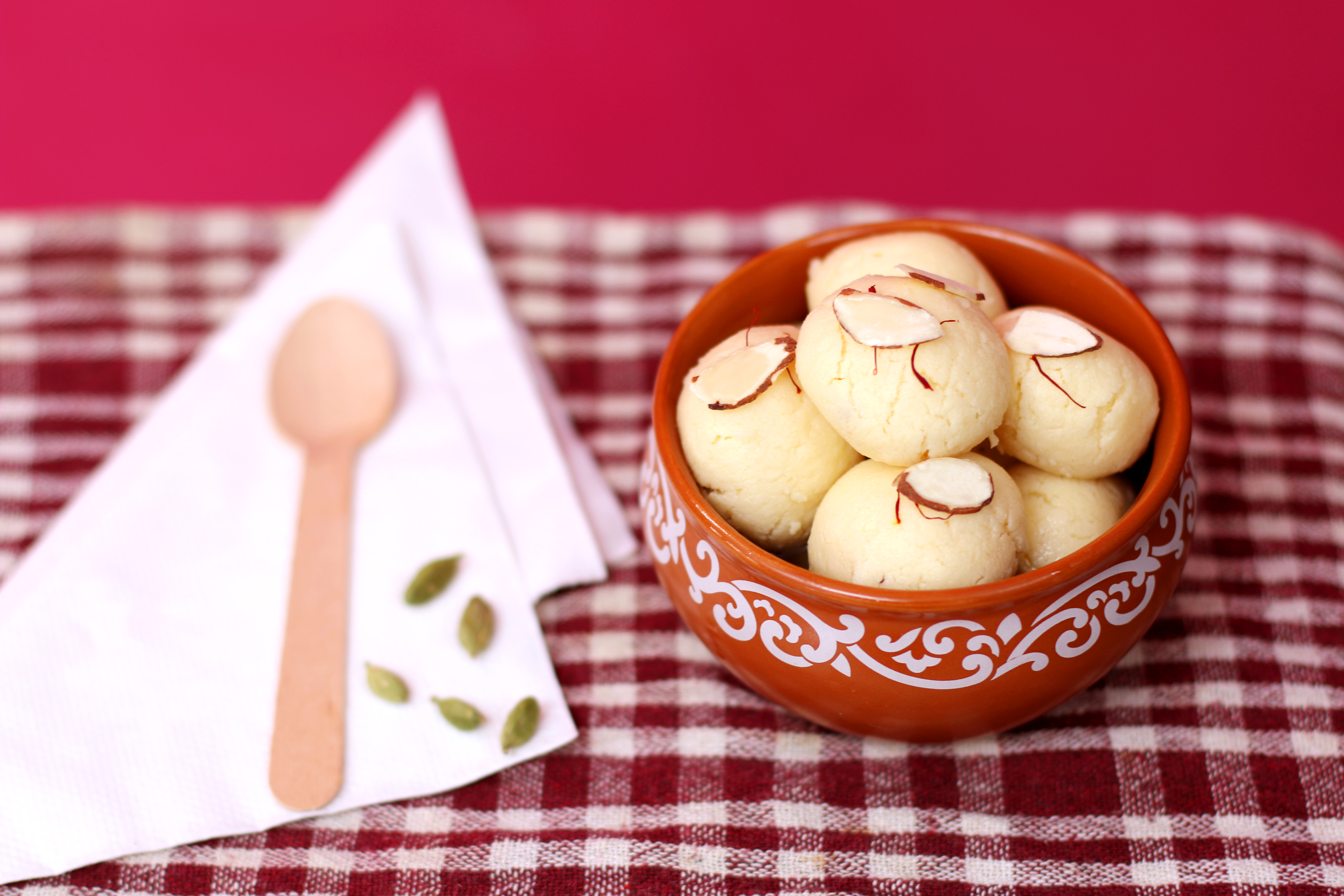
Rasagola, Odisha's special culinary delight made from cottage cheese, which has received GI tag in Geographical Indication Registry.

The "Odisha Rasagola" was awarded a geographical indication (GI) tag in 2019 after a long battle about the origin of the famous sweet with West Bengal.

This decision involved a broader interpretation of the law established under the Geographical Indications of Goods (Registration and Protection) Act, 1999. Section 2(e) of the Act stipulates that a geographical indication can be provided to a product if its quality, characteristics, or reputation are attributable to its geographical origin and are unique. The uniqueness of Odisha’s Rasagola lies in its color, texture, and taste, distinguishing it from the West Bengal variant. Historical references in Odisha’s texts support the geographical origin of the dish.

=== Dance ===
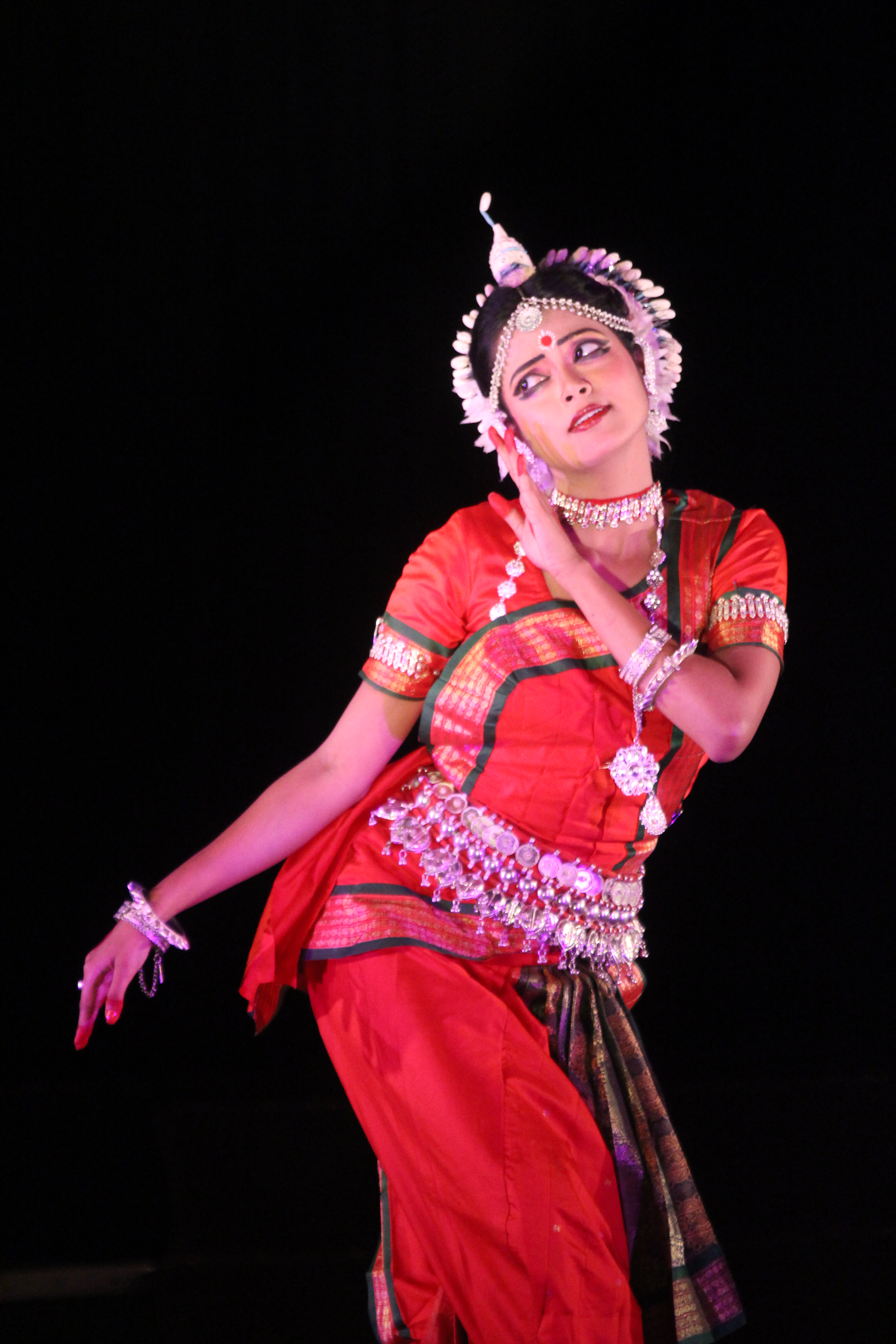
"Odissi" A scene from the abhinaya 'Tolagi Gopa Danda' choreographed by Guru Kelucharan Mahapatra. The dance was performed under the guidance of Guru Kelucharan Mahapatra.

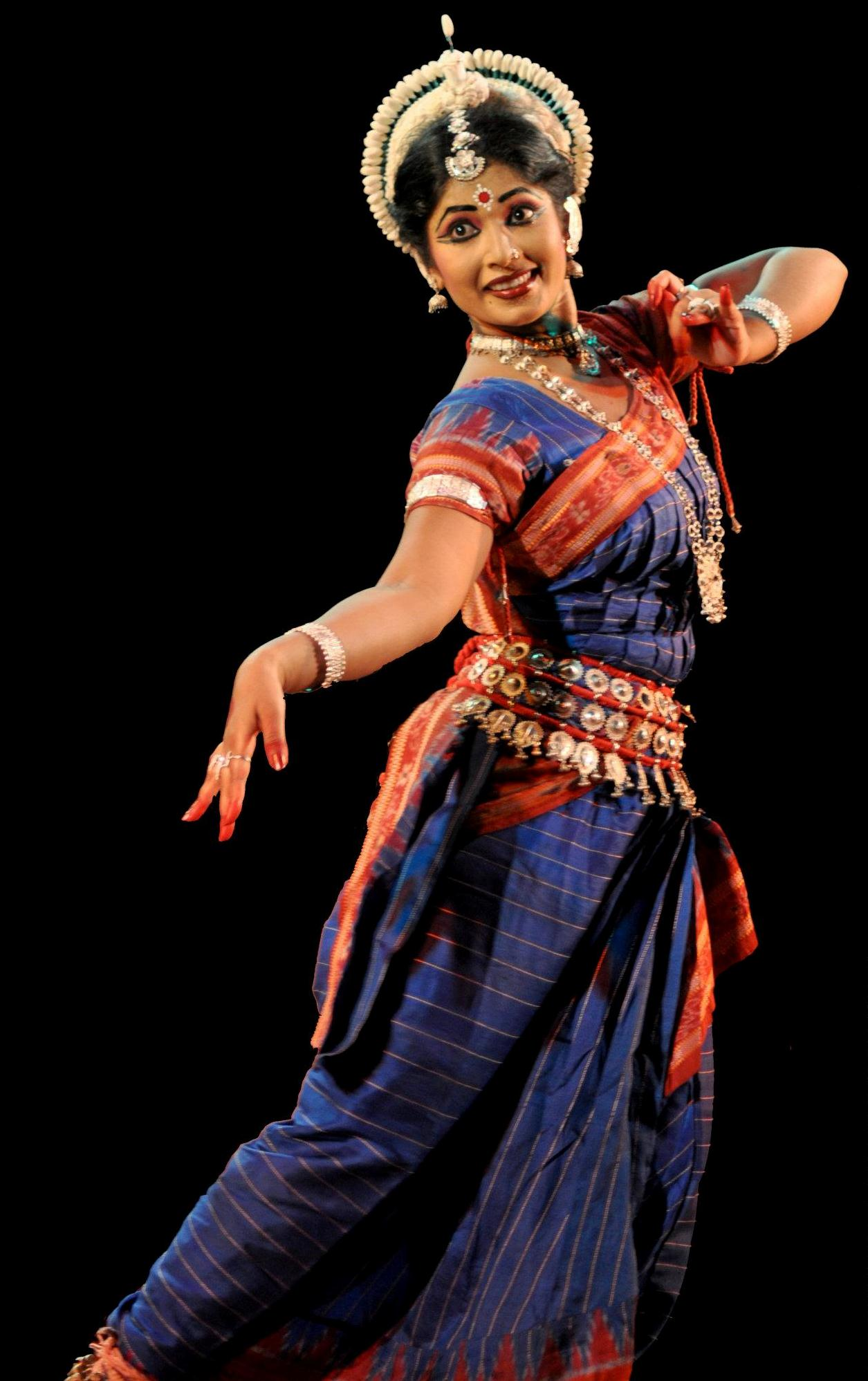
Mahari Dance, gave birth to the modern classical dance forms of Odissi

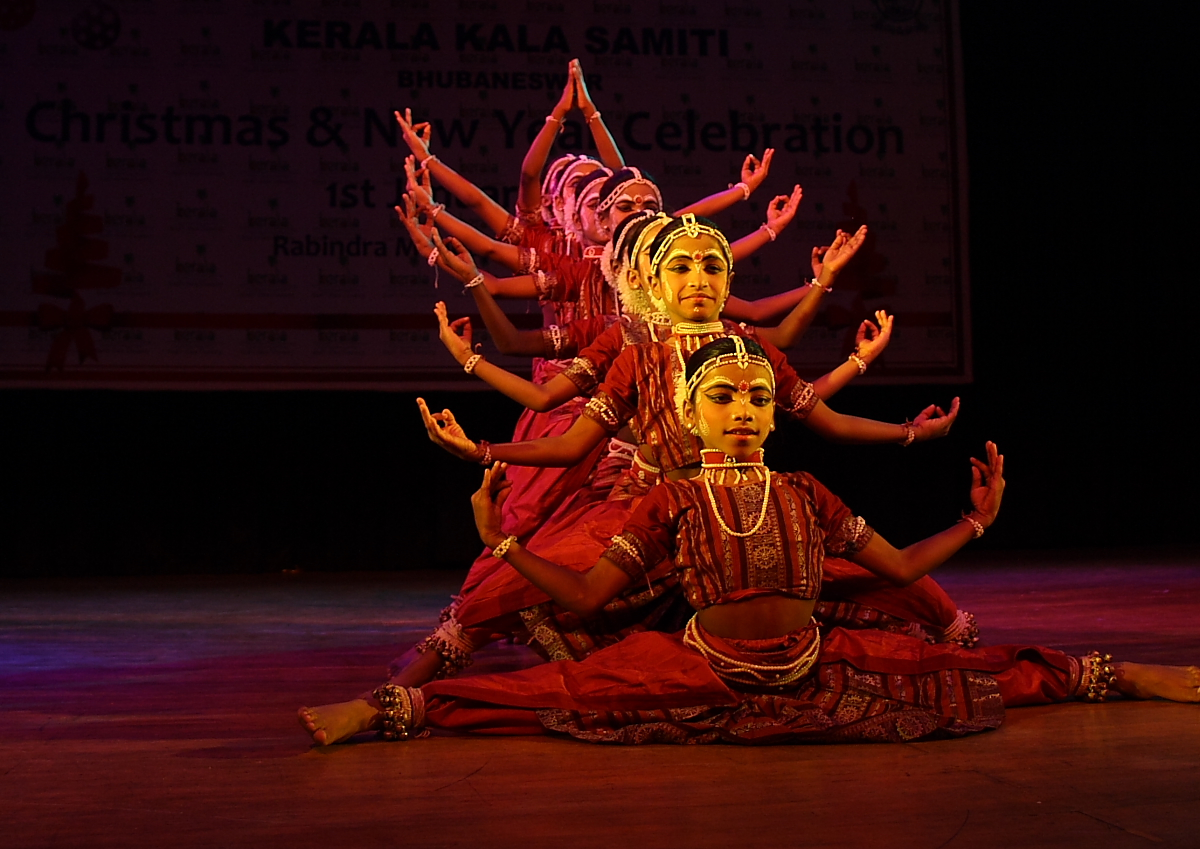
Gotipua Dance

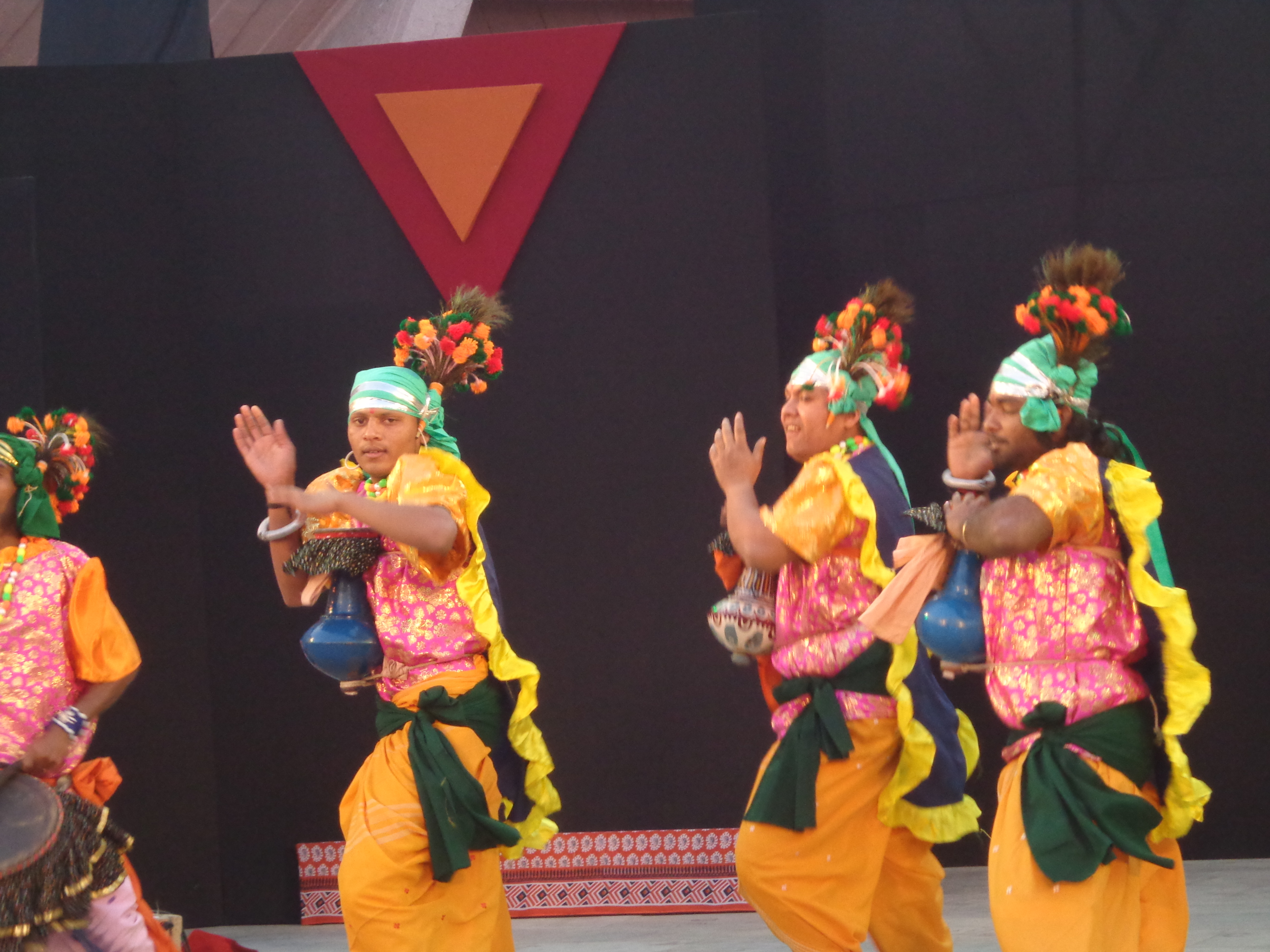
Ghumura folk dance

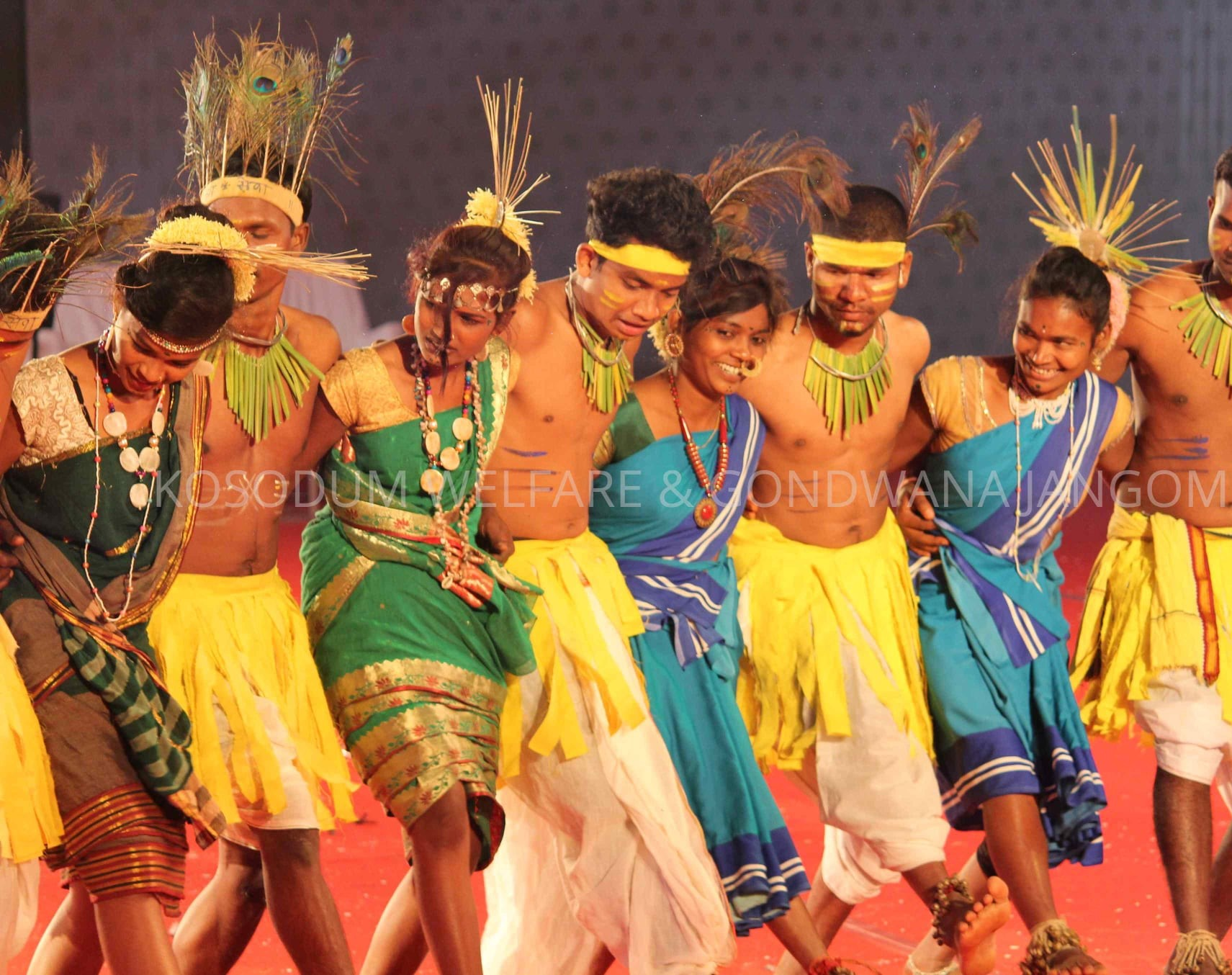
Dhemsa Dance

Odissi dance and music are classical art forms. Odissi is the oldest surviving dance form in India on the basis of archaeological evidence. Odissi has a long, unbroken tradition of 2,000 years, and finds mention in the Natyashastra of Bharatamuni, possibly written c. 200 BC. However, the dance form nearly became extinct during the British period, only to be revived after India's independence by a few gurus.

The variety of dances includes Ghumura dance, Chhau dance, Jhumair, Mahari dance, Dalkhai, Dhemsa and Gotipua.

Odissi is not only a dance form but also a spiritual expression deeply rooted in Odisha’s temple traditions. Characterized by graceful movements, intricate footwork, and sculpturesque poses, it draws inspiration from the carvings of the Konark Sun Temple and other ancient shrines of the region. The dance is traditionally performed as an act of devotion to Lord Jagannath and often depicts stories from Hindu epics such as the Ramayana, Mahabharata, and Geeta Govinda. The unique tribhangi posture, which divides the body into three bends (head, torso, and hips), and the fluid chauka stance, give Odissi its distinctive identity among classical dances of India.

Over centuries, Odissi has evolved from being a temple ritual to a respected performing art practiced worldwide. It blends lyrical music with expressive gestures (mudras) that communicate emotions and narratives with precision. Gurus like Kelucharan Mohapatra, Pankaj Charan Das, and others played a pivotal role in reviving and popularizing the form in the 20th century, ensuring its survival and global recognition. Today, Odissi is celebrated on prestigious stages across the world, symbolizing Odisha’s cultural heritage and artistic excellence.

The traditional performance of Odissi usually begins with Mangalacharan, an invocation to the deities, followed by Batu Nritya that highlights pure dance techniques. Pallavi showcases the dancer’s mastery through elaborate rhythmic patterns, while Abhinaya brings mythological stories to life through expressive storytelling. The recital often concludes with Moksha, symbolizing spiritual liberation, where the dancer blends technical skill with a deep sense of devotion. This structured presentation makes Odissi both aesthetically rich and spiritually profound.

Costumes and music also play an important role in Odissi. Dancers typically wear brightly colored saris made of Sambalpuri or Bomkai silk, adorned with silver jewelry crafted in Odisha’s traditional style. The music is based on Odissi classical ragas and talas, blending elements of both Hindustani and Carnatic traditions, and is performed with instruments like the mardala (a traditional percussion instrument), flute, sitar, and violin. Together, the visual elegance and the melodic accompaniment create an atmosphere that connects performers and audiences to the deep cultural and devotional roots of Odisha.

== Sports ==
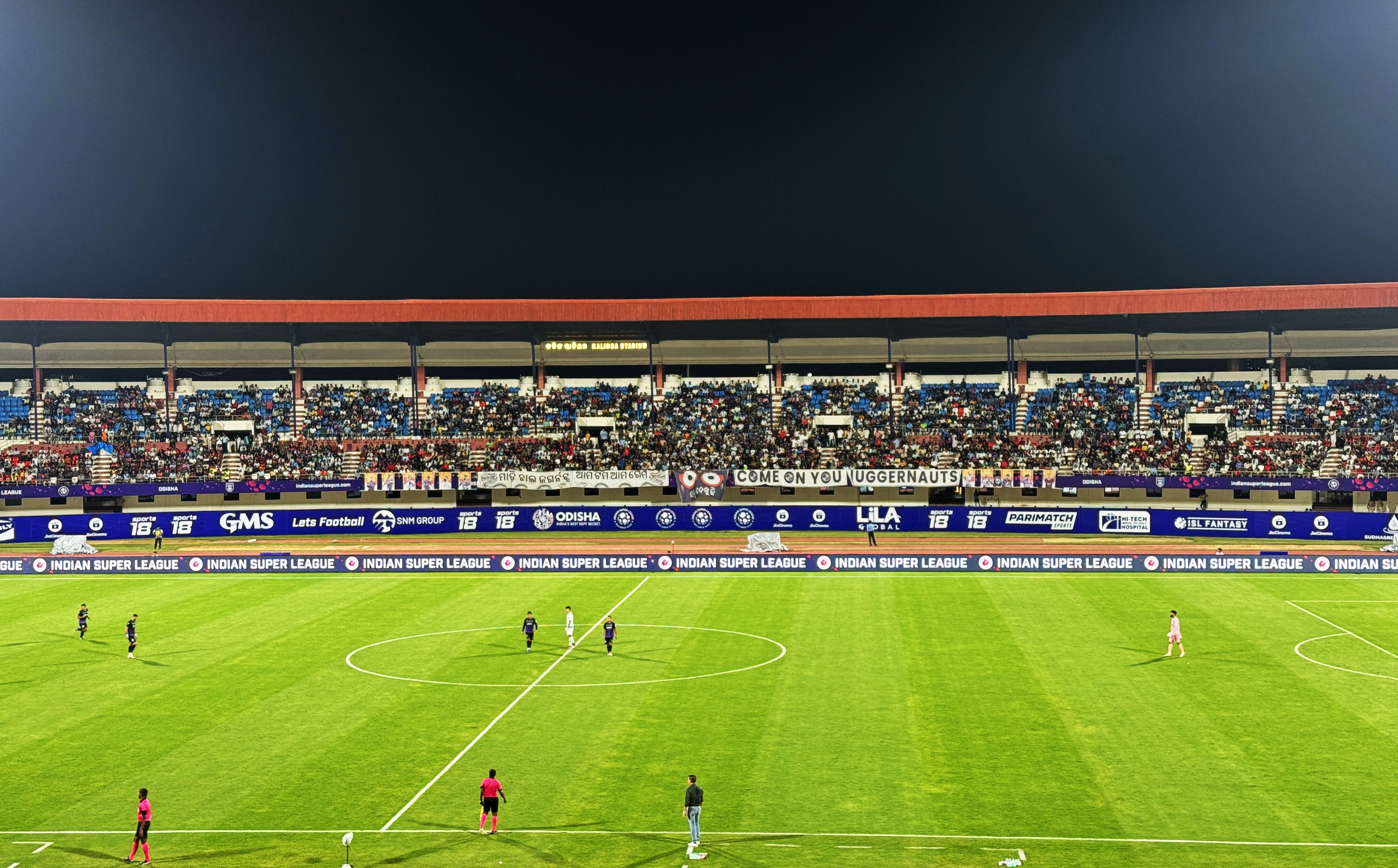
Kalinga Stadium in Bhubaneswar

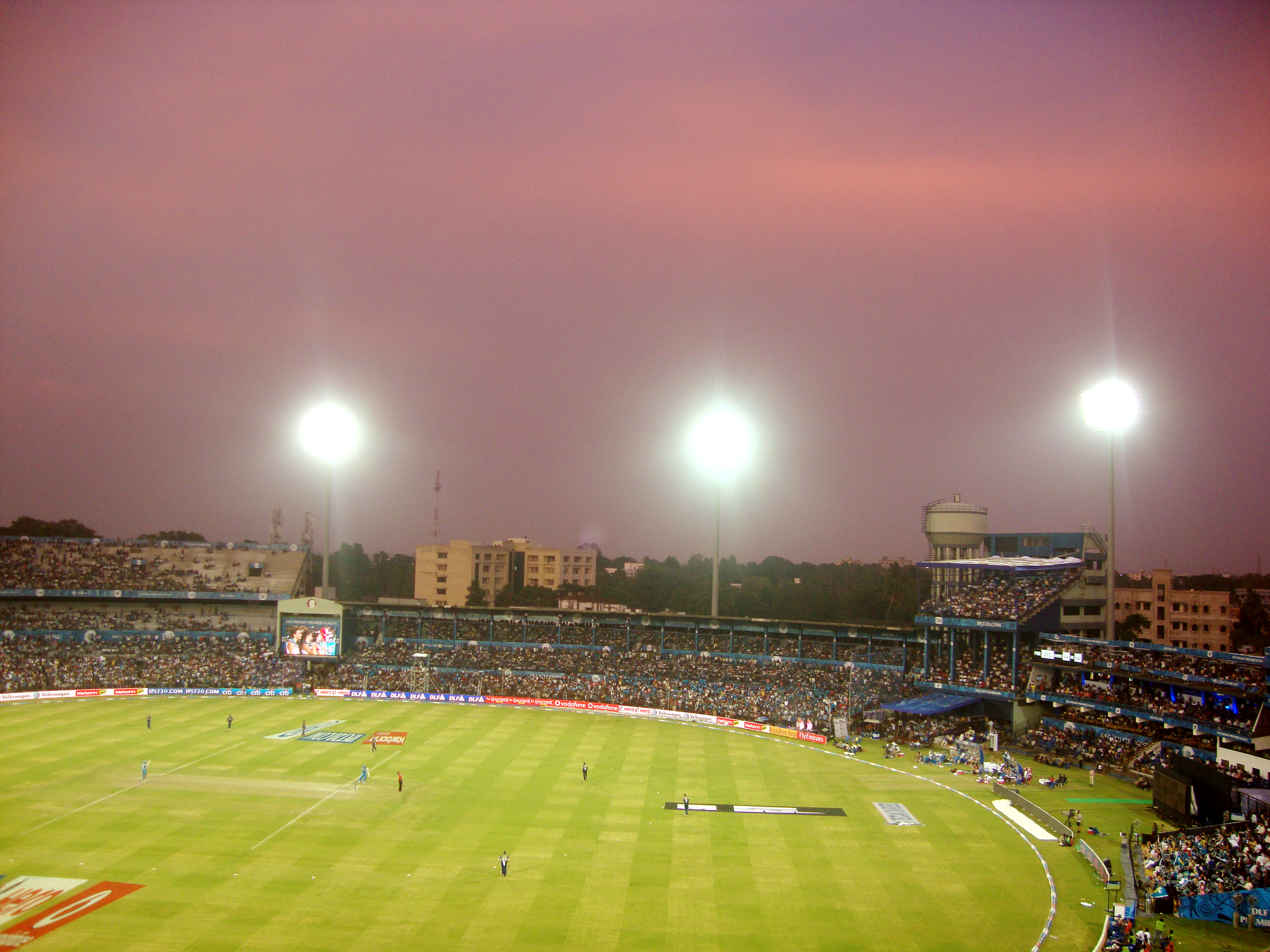
Barabati Stadium in Cuttack

The state of Odisha has hosted several international sporting events, including the 2018 Men's Hockey World Cup, 2022 FIFA U-17 Women's World Cup and 2023 Men's Hockey World Cup.

Sports stadiums in Odisha include:

1. Kalinga Stadium
2. Barabati Stadium
3. Jawaharlal Nehru Indoor Stadium
4. East Coast Railway Stadium
5. Biju Patnaik Hockey Stadium
6. KIIT Stadium
7. Veer Surendra Sai Stadium
8. Birsa Munda International Hockey Stadium

There are some High Performance Centres in the state as well which have been set up at Kalinga Stadium for the development of respective sports in Odisha. Some of the HPCs are as follows:

- Abhinav Bindra Targeting Performance (ABTP)
- Dalmia Bharat Gopichand Badminton Academy
- JSW Swimming HPC
- Khelo India State Centre of Excellence (KISCE) for Athletics, Hockey, and Weightlifting
- KJS Ahluwalia and Tenvic Sports HPC for Weightlifting
- Odisha Naval Tata Hockey High Performance Centre (ONTHHPC)
- Odisha Aditya Birla and Gagan Narang Shooting HPC
- Reliance Foundation Odisha Athletics HPC
- SAI Regional Badminton Academy
- Udaan Badminton Academy
- AIFF High Performance Centre

== Tourism ==
The Lingaraja Temple at Bhubaneswar has a 150-foot (46 m) high deula while the Jagannath Temple, Puri is about 200 feet (61 m) high and dominates the skyline. Only a portion of the Konark Sun Temple at Konark in Puri district, the largest of the temples of the "Holy Golden Triangle" exists today, and it is still staggering in size. It stands out as a masterpiece in Odisha architecture. Sarala Temple, regarded as one of the most spiritually elevated expressions of Shaktism is in Jagatsinghpur district. It is also one of the holiest places in Odisha and a major tourist attraction. Maa Tarini Temple situated in Kendujhar district is also a famous pilgrimage destination. Every day thousands of coconuts are given to Maa Tarini by devotees for fulfilling their wishes.

Odisha's varying topography – from the wooded Eastern Ghats to the fertile river basin – has proven ideal for evolution of compact and unique ecosystems. This creates treasure troves of flora and fauna that are inviting to many migratory species of birds and reptiles. Bhitarkanika National Park in Kendrapada district is famous for its second largest mangrove ecosystem. The bird sanctuary in Chilika Lake (Asia's largest brackish water lake). The tiger reserve and waterfalls in Simlipal National Park, Mayurbhanj district are integral parts of eco-tourism in Odisha, arranged by Odisha Tourism.

Daringbadi is a hill station in the Kandhamal district. It is known as "Kashmir of Odisha", for its climatic similarity. Chandipur, in Baleswar district is a calm and serene site, is mostly unexplored by tourists. The unique speciality of this beach is the ebb tides that recede up to 4 km and tend to disappear rhythmically.

In the western part of Odisha, Hirakud Dam in Sambalpur district is the longest earthen dam in the World. It also forms the biggest artificial lake in Asia. The Debrigarh Wildlife Sanctuary is situated near Hirakud Dam. Samaleswari Temple is a Hindu temple in Sambalpur city, dedicated to the goddess known as 'Samaleswari', the presiding deity of Sambalpur, is a strong religious force in western part of Odisha and Chhattisgarh state. The Leaning Temple of Huma is located near Sambalpur. The temple is dedicated to the Hindu god Lord Bimaleshwar. Sri Sri Harishankar Devasthana, is a temple on the slopes of Gandhamardhan hills, Balangir district. It is popular for its scenes of nature and connection to two Hindu lords, Vishnu and Shiva. On the opposite side of the Gandhamardhan hills is the temple of Sri Nrusinghanath, is situated at the foothills of Gandhamardhan Hill near Paikmal, Bargarh district.

In the southern part of Odisha, The Taratarini Temple on the Kumari hills at the bank of the Rushikulya River near Berhampur city in Ganjam district. Here worshiped as the Breast Shrine (Sthana pitha) and manifestations of Adi Shakti. The Tara Tarini Shakta pitha is one of the oldest pilgrimage centers of the Mother Goddess and is one of four major ancient Tantra pitha and Shakta pithas in India. Deomali is a mountain peak of the Eastern Ghats. It is located in Koraput district. This peak with an elevation of about 1,672 m, is the highest peak in Odisha.

The share of foreign tourists' arrival in the state is below one per cent of total foreign tourist arrivals at all India level.

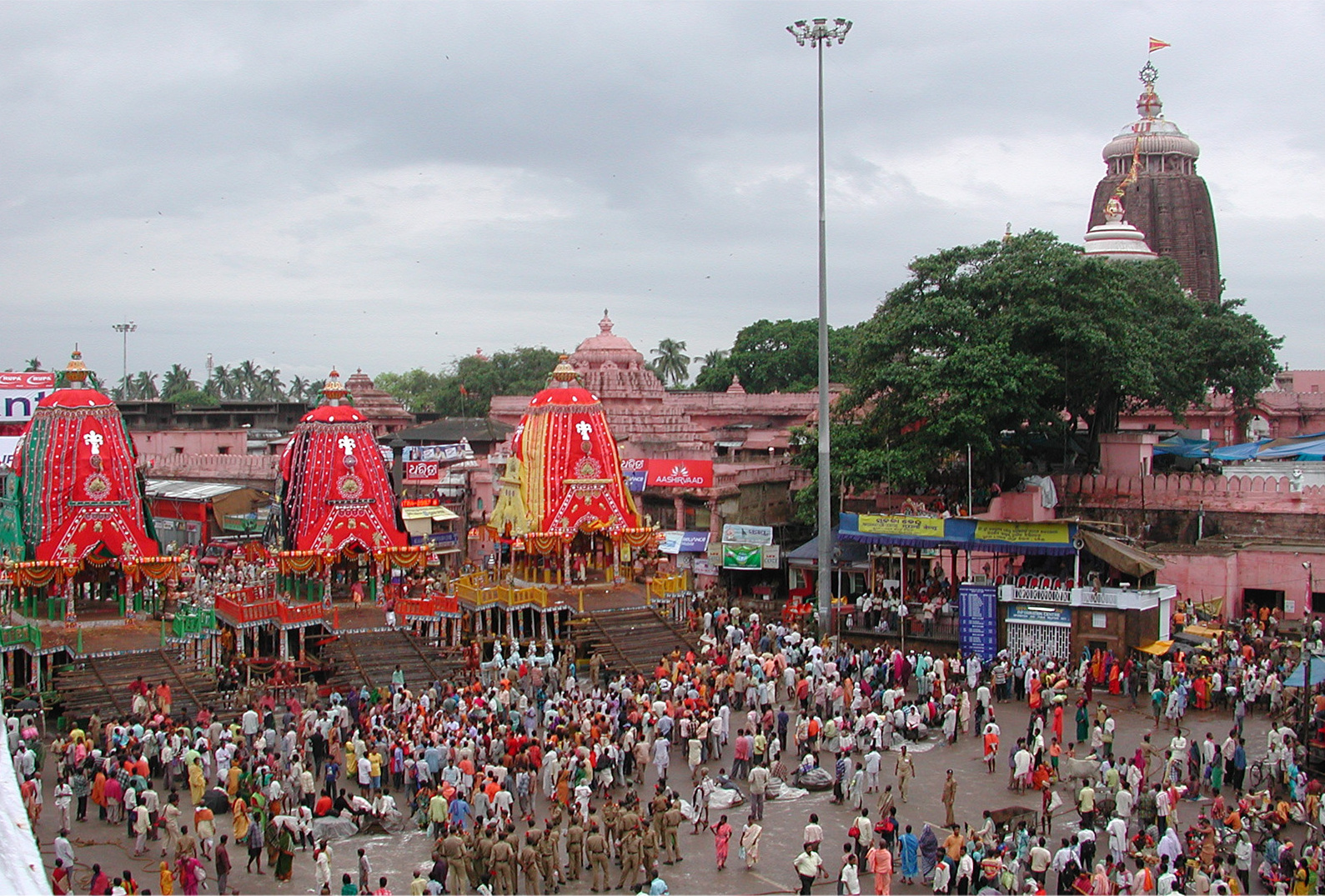
The Rath Yatra in Jagannath Temple, Puri

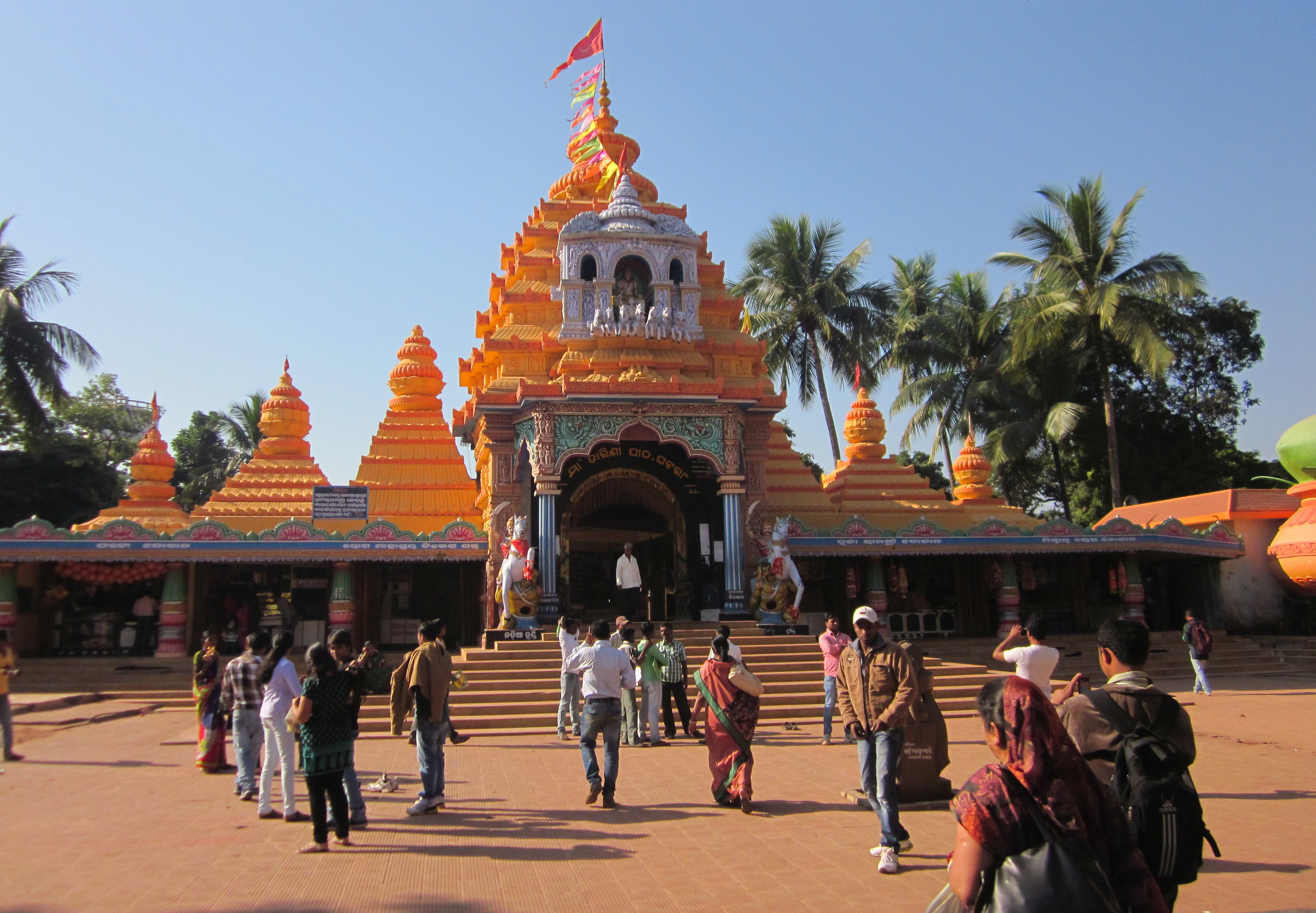
Maa Tarini Temple, Ghatgaon

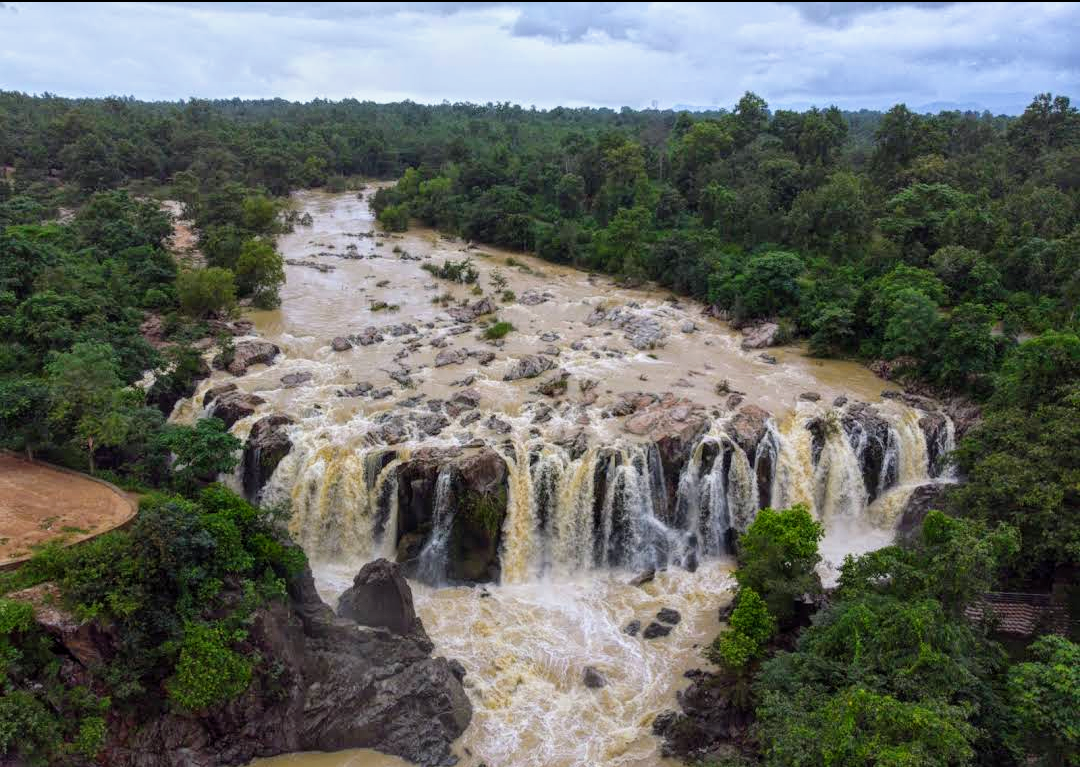
Gundichaghagi waterfall Keonjhar during monsoons

== See also ==
- Outline of Odisha
- East India
- Odia people
