= Pattamundai =

- Town
- Location in Odisha, India Pattamundai (India)
- Coordinates: 20.57°N 86.57°E
- Country: India
- State: Odisha
- District: Kendrapara

Government
  - Type: Local (Municipality)
  - Body: Pattamundai Municipality
  - Chairman: Hemant Kumar Sahoo

Area
  - Total: 2.54 km^{2} (0.98 sq mi)
- Elevation: 6 m (20 ft)

Population (2011 [Actual Numbers Might Be Much Higher])
  - Total: 36,528
  - Density: 14,400/km^{2} (37,200/sq mi)

Languages
  - Official: Odia
- Time zone: UTC+5:30 (IST)
- PIN: 754215
- Telephone code: 06729
- Vehicle registration: OD-29

Pattamundai is a town and a municipality in Kendrapara district in the Indian state of Odisha, located on the centre of SH-9A from Cuttack to Chandbali along the south end of Brahmani River. It is also the headquarter of Pattamundai Block.

== Etymology ==
Pattamundai derives its name from being the last town(head=munda) on the gate(patak) on the Pattamundai Canal and Gobari Canal junction at Alva. and the Gobari canal ends at Gandakia, the present end point of the Gobari river. The Gobari river is still active in some portion. nd there are many theories prevailing on the sources of derivations and we may place those derivations as follows:

01. The earlier name was "PATUMUNDA" (ପଟୁମୁଣ୍ଡା) (Patu+Munda) and it has been converted to current name through colloquial processes. And the word PATU is an Odia word which means the "Alluvial soil or silt" which is normally flows with the floods in the rivers (as per Page 4526, Purna chandra Bhasakosha by Late Gopal Praharaj). And the word "Munda" is head or side in Odia. The Brahmani river was earlier flowing through this village long back. You can find now the marks of the river beds between present village "Bangali Diha and Mandapada" (ବଂଗାଲିଦିଆ ଓ ମଣ୍ଡପଡ଼ା) and " Kasananta and Balipada". (The Brahmani had a branch linking "the Gobari" river which is now called "the Pota Nai" and the branching happened at the place where the building of Sub-Registrar Office, Pattamundai is now standing and it was called "Chatara"(ଚତର), which I have heard during my school days. The word "Chatara" also means "A wide expansion of plot of the surface of a tank not overgrown or covered with aquatic grass or reeds" (Page-2518 - Purnachandra Bhashakosha By Late Praharaj). The branch was called the Gobari and as the river was dead after the track of the Brahmani changed to a straight link after the village "Balipatana" towards village "Patrapur". When the river Gobari was live, during floods heavy deposits of the alluvial soil was deposited at "chatar" location. Hence the village was called "Patu Munda"

02. The second derivation is from the name "PATAMUNDA" (ପାଟମୁଣ୍ଡା) (Pata+Munda). The theory goes like this. The Rivers do have some unique features like "PATA"(ପାଟ) and "PALA"(ପାଳ) on them. The word "PATA" (ପାଟ) which denotes "Fen; Low and unproductive land; Bog; Marsh; Swamp" (page-4722 of Purna Chandra Bhashakosha) and the word "PALA"(ପାଳ) means "the silted land on the bed or bank of a river". Among many Patas of the area, the biggest was the "BOITALA PATA", which was few kilometres towards eastern direction of the Brahmani and the Gobari river system. And many villages now exists like Taradipala, PenthaPala, Belapala in these river systems. As the village was situated on a side of a larger Pata, the naming also might be justified with the name "PATA MUNDA". And with passage of time it is now Pattamundai.

03..The weaker derivation might be, the name of the town is derived from the word "Pata" which means Canal Gate a reference to the ancient lock on Pattamundai Canal at Alva and "Munda" means head. It is the biggest market-hub in the whole of Kendrapara District due to its position and connectivity to Rajnagar, Aali, Rajkanika & Cuttack.Pattamundai is famous for Durga Puja.

== History ==
Pattamundai is an ancient trading river port. The town came into historical limelight during the Mughal Empire. However, no archaeological remains have been found. Scanning the area is almost impossible as for the high density of population that resides over it. Akbar established the land revenue system here in 1515 AD. Mentions can be found when Emperor Aurangzeb imparted financial and manpower patronage to the Madrasa at Pattamundai port to impart education to their children, which even flourishes today. Muslim ruled from 1576 to 1751 AD. Pattamundai was under the Utikan Pargana and they placed an Amil here for land revenue collection. British forces under Colonel Harcourt marched from Cuttack to Kujang sometime during late October- early November 1803 and Pattamundai fell from the hands of the Marathas unopposed. The Paika Bidroha broke out in the neighboring kingdom of Khurda in 1817 and had spread to Pattamundai in July, where 200 paikas attacked the Thana and killed many. The Pattamundai Thana included 3 influential Zamindar lords - Bhatikona, Ali & Kanika. Mention can be found during Damage Assessment after the floods in October 1848 when it used to be a Taluka under the Utikan Estate (pargana), Madanpur. The Cuttack-Chandbali road had to be lowered a number of timer to allow the flood water to pass by so as to prevent abnormal flooding. In the Kendrapara sub-division the great cyclone of September 1885 destroyed 46 villages in thana Patamundai, most of the inhabitants of which were either drowned or succumbed to the fever and cholera which usually form the sequel of such calamities, while those that survived emigrated to tracts less exposed to the destructive action of storm- waves. In the census of 1901, it was noted that the population of pattamundai was steadily growing after the construction of protective embankments and the offer of easy terms of settlement by the British led to considerable reclamation of land which had been thrown out of cultivation by the salt-water floods of 1885. The Sub-Registrar's office was opened in Pattamundai in 1908. Pattamundai was a part of the Cuttack District until 1994. During the British period it was an important point between the capital city of Cuttack and the estates of Aali & Kanika and the ports of Chandabali and Dhamara. Being a major center of business, markets flourished here along with other places like Jajpur, Jagatsinghpur, Kendrapara. Agricultural and hand crafted products were exported to other parts of India like Madras, Bombay, Ceylon, the Maldive islands and European countries.

== Geography ==
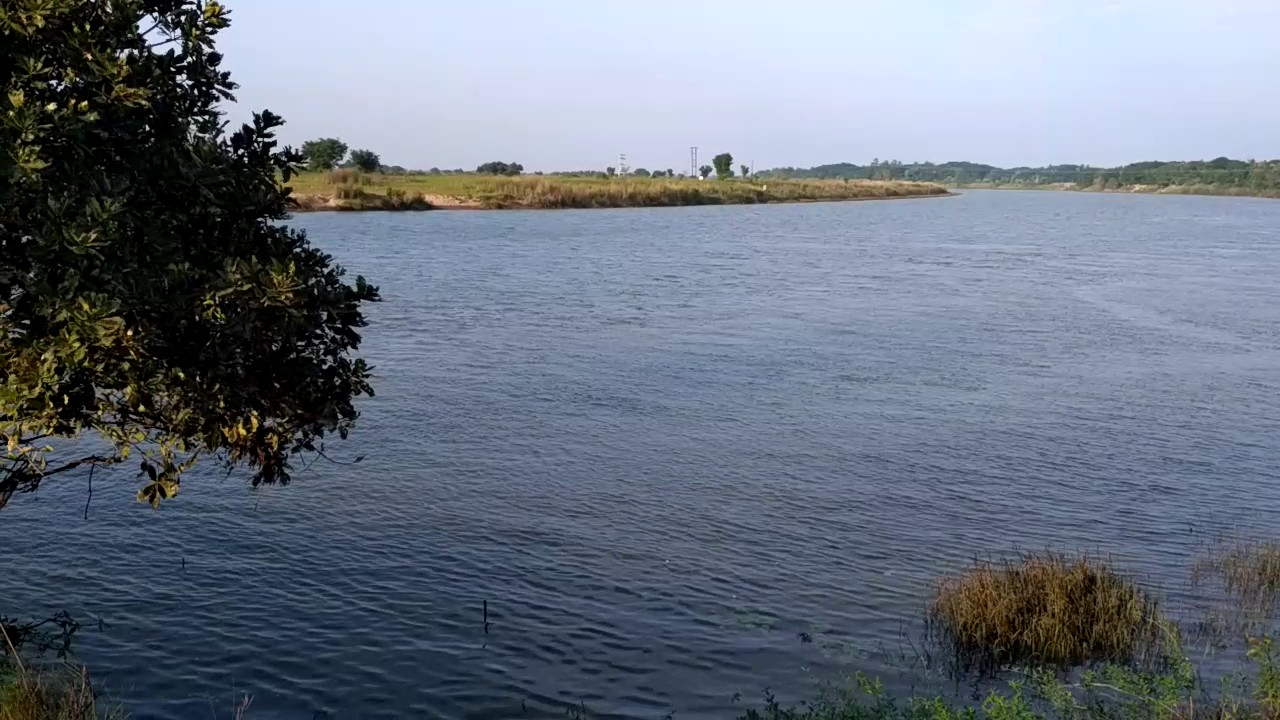
View of River Brahmani from Nilakanthapur Village Near Pattamundai

Pattamundai is located at 20.57°N 86.57°E. Pattamundai is located 22 km from the Bay of Bengal in the Utkal Plains, at an elevation of 6 m from sea level. Pattamundai is a flat, low-lying delta region in the Lower Mahanadi River basin. The Brahmani river divides it from the Aali Block. The Pattamundai Canal running from Cuttack to Alva Lock (80.5 km) constructed by the East India Company during the mid 19th century, is a major irrigation canal passing through the city. The river Brahmani is passing by the side of this municipality and flood water of this river has been inundating over 50% geographical area of this municipality every year. This municipality also comes under the purview of cyclonic zone. So the residence of this municipality suffers a lot due to natural calamity every year.

== Climate ==
Pattamundai experiences a tropical wet and dry climate. The summers are much rainier than the winters in Pattamundai. This location is classified as Aw by Köppen and Geiger. The average annual temperature in Pattamundai is 27.0 °C. Precipitation here averages 1502 mm.. The summer season is from March to June when the climate is hot and humid. The temperature around this season is 35 °C to 40 °C Thunderstorms are common at the height of the summer. Rains brought by the Bay of Bengal branch of the south west summer monsoon lash Pattamundai between June and September, supplying it with most of its annual rainfall of 1,502 mm (59 in). The highest monthly rainfall total, 343 mm (14 in), occurs in August. from the South West Monsoon. Temperatures are considerably lower during the rainy season, averaging around 30 °C. The winter season from November to February is characterised by mild temperatures and occasional showers. The winter months feature chilly northerly winds which bring down the temperature to around 15 °C, though the bright sunshine helps maintain the pleasant weather. Temperatures may exceed 45 °C at the height of summer and may fall below 10 °C in winter.

Climate data for Pattamundai
Month	Jan	Feb	Mar	Apr	May	Jun	Jul	Aug	Sep	Oct	Nov	Dec	Year
Record high °C (°F)	27.3 (81.1)	29.9 (85.8)	33.8 (92.8)	36 (97)	36.1 (97.0)	34.2 (93.6)	31.3 (88.3)	31.3 (88.3)	31.6 (88.9)	30.6 (87.1)	29.1 (84.4)	27.2 (81.0)	36.1 (97)
Daily mean °C (°F)	21.3 (70.3)	23.9 (75.0)	27.9 (82.2)	30.6 (87.1)	31.4 (88.5)	30.3 (86.5)	28.5 (83.3)	28.6 (83.5)	28.7 (83.7)	27.2 (81.0)	23.9 (75.0)	21.2 (70.2)	27.0 (80.5)
Record low °C (°F)	15.4 (59.7)	18 (64)	22.1 (71.8)	25.2 (77.4)	26.7 (80.1)	26.4 (79.5)	25.8 (78.4)	25.9 (78.6)	25.8 (78.4)	23.8 (74.8)	18.8 (65.8)	15.2 (59.4)	15.2 (59.4)
Average precipitation mm (inches)	12 (0.5)	30 (1.2)	31 (1.2)	31 (1.2)	75 (3.0)	202 (8.0)	290 (11.4)	343 (13.5)	260 (10.2)	174 (6.9)	47 (1.9)	7 (0.3)	1,502 (59.3)
Source: climate-data.org

=== Floods ===
Due to the proximity to coast and being located near the delta of some great river systems, cyclones and floods are a permanent feature of this region from the Bay of Bengal. The rivers that flood Pattamundai are Brahmani, Kani and Gobari. Some great floods recorded after the advent of the British Raj are in 1855,1866,1892,1896, August 1907, August 1920, August–September 1926, August–September–October 1955, Aug-Oct 1971, 1977,1979,1982, 1991,1992,1994,1995,1997,1999,2001,2003,2006, 2008, 2009, 2011, 2013. Besides. Tsunami, drought, crop loss, cyclone, sun-stroke, lightning etc. are the natural calamities faced by the district which has impact on the economy of the district.

=== Cyclones ===
Some great recorded cyclones occurred in 1445 (during reign of Kapilendra Dev), 1823 (Balesore Cyclone), 1831, 1832, 1835, 14 to 16 October 1842, 1865 (25% people perished in famine, followed by diarrhoea in 1886), 22 Sept 1885, June 1890 (9/10th people neither had grain nor any means of purchasing it), 22 Sept 1892 (cyclone washed away 300 villages and changed the geological map of Kendrapara District), storm of 1893 & 1908, 1936, 9 September 1967 (all water bodies contaminated & food grains washed away in tsunami and rain), 29 October 1971 (10,000 deaths in the state), 3 June 1982 (Summer Cyclone), Super Cyclone of 1999 (1,45,000 houses completely washed away, 375 human casualties and the value of loss of property was estimated to be Rs.6,18,43,23,000), October 2013 (Phailin, Rs. 1,37,17,11,900 agricultural loss & loss of property Rs. 1,03,71,71,190), 2014 (Hud-Hud). The United Nations Development Programme reports that there is "very high damage risk" from winds and cyclones. The 1999 Odisha cyclone caused severe damage to the town claiming many lives. Crocodiles escape from the Bhitarkanika National park during flood times and roam free around the region.

=== Heat Wave ===
In May 1998, the heat waves caused sun-stroke which blew over coastal Odisha including Pattamundai. During this period, the temperature of Pattamundai was between 45 and 48 degree Celsius. 15 people died of sunstroke in Kendrapara district in 1998.

Flood and Cyclone are a perennial phenomenon of Pattamundai. The main cause of concern is the geographical location of the town and the rivers system netting in the region. The Bureau of Indian Standards places the city inside seismic zone III on a scale ranging from I to V in order of increasing susceptibility to earthquakes.

== Culture ==
Pattamundai has a religious brotherhood and people from all religions celebrate festivals together.

The place has some minor population of Muslims. There was some misunderstanding with Hindu community with a stray incident of a Kartikesar Puja. But later it was resolved amicably. The Christianity is almost nil.(0.04% in 2011 census).

=== Festivals ===
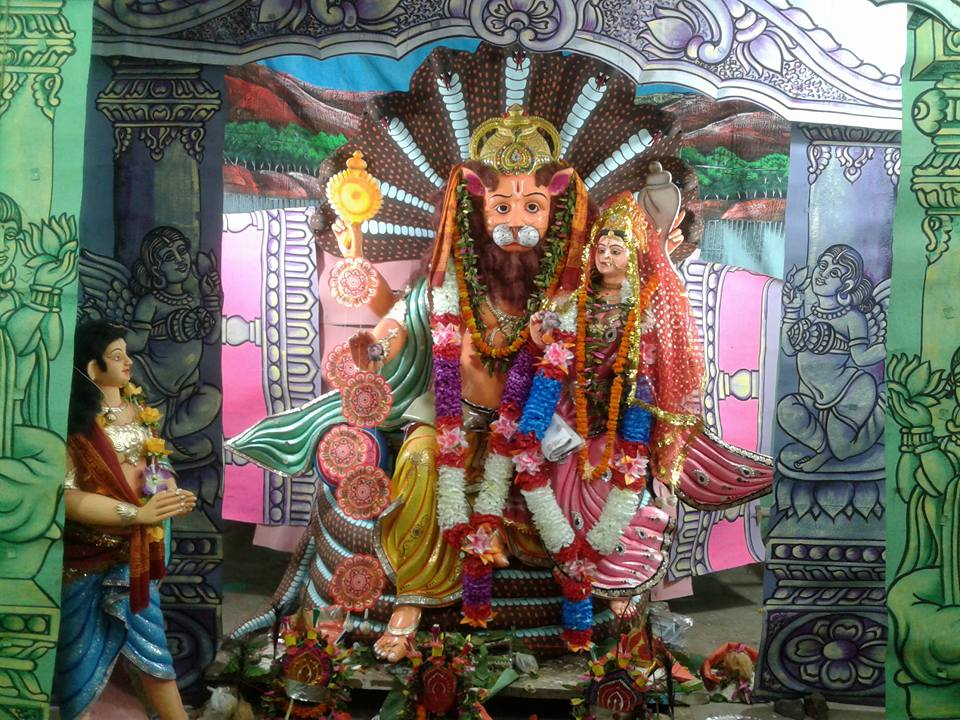
Durga Puja In Mahabir Bazar, Pattamundai

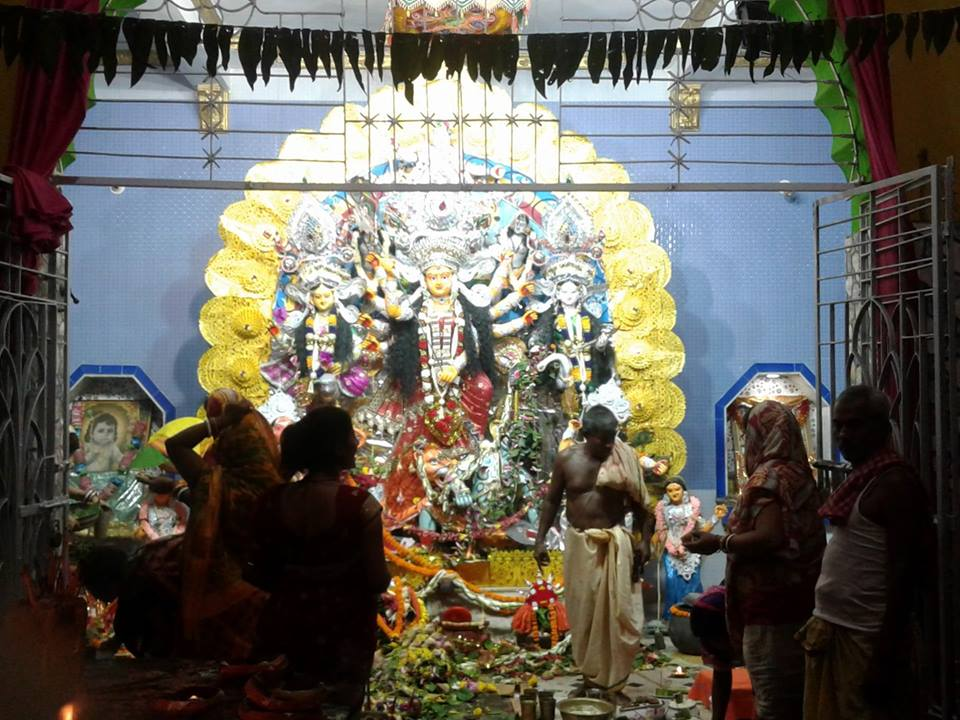
Bangali Durga Medha In Pattamundai

- Durga Puja: Pattamundai is famous throughout the area for its Durga puja celebrations. Nearly 20 earthen idols of Goddess Durga and other idols are prepared by the different Puja Committees of the city to celebrate Durga Puja. Pattamundai celebrates Durga Puja with full energy on Maha Saptami, Maha Ashtami, Maha Navami and on Vijaya Dashami or Dussehra by burning an effigy of the demon Ravana. People from Kendrapara district visit Pattamundai during this period to observe the famous festival.
- Boita Bandana: This festival is celebrated on the last day of the holy Hindu month of Kartik. On this auspicious day people flow miniature boitas or model boats in the Baitarani river to pay homage to the ancient merchants of Kalinga Kingdom. This day also marks the beginning of Bali Jatra. The celebration is to commemorate the old memory of the business with South eastern countries of Asia by Sadhaba community with ritualistic floating of model boats around the same time of year.
- Kartikeshwar Puja: The puja in Pattamundai is organised since last few years by the puja committees of Pattamundai. This festival is observed to worship Kartikeya, the eldest son of Lord Shiva.

All the other regular Indian festivals like Ratha Yatra, Raja, Ganesh Chaturthi, Vasant Panchami, Holi, Diwali, Id, are celebrated here.

== Cuisine ==
The place has complete Odia culture, hence the cuisine is no different. Pattamundai is an agricultural center and is famous for Dalma-Bhaata, Bara-Aludam and Dahibara, of which all the ingredients are home grown. Apart from this, Chaat, Gupchup(Hindi: Panipuri) and Singoda(Samosa), Aloochop rule the streets. The people eat rice as their main staple food. Chakuli Pitha is eaten during the breakfast. It is made from rice batter using a tawa. Traditional Odiaa food such as Dahi-Pakhala (Rice soaked in water with yogurt & seasonings) is widely consumed, accompanied by Badi Chura or Saaga. considered as a body coolant, it is consumed during months of April–June.

== Demography ==
=== Population ===
Others include Jainism, Sikhism and Buddhism

Religions in Pattamundai
Religion	Percent
Hinduism	94.48%
Islam	5.40%
Christianity	0.04%
Others	0.01%
Not Stated	0.05%

As of 2011 census of India Pattamundai NAC has a population of 36,528 of which 18,549 are males while 17,979 are females. Males constitute 51% of the population and females 49%. Population of Children with age of 0-6 is 4024 which is 11.02% of total population of Pattamundai. In Pattamundai Female Sex Ratio is of 969 against state average of 979. Moreover, Child Sex Ratio in Pattamundai is around 910 compared to Odisha state average of 941. In population of Pattamundai in 1991 & 2001 were 28,220 & 32730 respectively.

Literacy rate of Pattamundai city is 86.93% higher than state average of 72.87%. In Pattamundai, Male literacy is around 92.64% while female literacy rate is 81.09%. Pattamundai Municipality has total administration over 7,174 houses to which it supplies basic amenities like water and sewerage. It is also authorize to build roads within Municipal limits and impose taxes on properties coming under its jurisdiction.

Pattamundai is a Revenue Tehsil & a Block and consists of 30 Gram panchayat's and 153 village's with a combined population of over 1.82 lakhs.

Around 94% of the city's population are Hindus while Muslims account for 5.40% and the rest constitute less than 1% of the total population.

=== Languages ===
Odia is the primary language used in the city, besides which Hindi is also spoken and understood. There are people who also speak Bengali, Urdu. Most of the banners are written in Odia and English.

There also exists a significant populace of Bengalis here, who work in the construction field as labourers. Sometimes, few groups of the tribal people of Keonjhar District are also seen who work as migrant laborers, during the non-agricultural season. As the refugees of erstwhile East Pakistan were settled near Gunthi village (unfortunately the settlement was washed away in 1971 high tide completely) and later many refugees from Bangladesh have managed to be residents at coastal area of the District. Those population are gradually come to the town to settle.

== Civic Administration ==
This Urban Local Body was constituted on 8 December 1988. The ULB was declared as a municipality by the Government Of Odisha in February 2014. The geographical area of this Municipality is 24 km^{2} having 37527 population as per census 2011. This ULB is subdivide in to 20 Political wards having 17 revenue villages for providing better administration to the public. This ULB is governed by Municipality under the chairmanship of Smt. Baijayantimala Lenka since 30th Sept 2014.

The river Brahmani is passing by the side of this ULB and flood water of this river has been inundating over 50% geographical area of this ULB were inundating before formation of NAC. This ULB also comes under the purview of cyclonic zone. So the residence of this ULB suffer a lot due to natural calamity every year.

The basic information relating to this Municipality is as follows: 1 Total No. of Holdings 7276 2 No. of Government Hospital 1 3 Total No. of Wards 20 (a) S.C. representative 6 (Men-2+ Women-4) (b) S.T. (Women) representative 1 (Vacant ) (c) OBC/SEBC/B.B.C. representative 6 (Male -3 + Female-3) (d) Unreserved representative 7 (Men-2+ Women-5) 4 Length of Road under NAC 289.5 km. 5 No. of Slums 21 6 BPL Population/Holding (as per 2003 survey) 18052/4513 7 No. of Slum Householders 1,696 8 No. of Educational Institutions 35 (a) Nodal Primary School 24 (b) Public School 5 (c) High School 4 (d) College 2 9 No. of Homeopathic Dispensary Nil 10 No. of Sulabha Souchalaya 1 11 No. of Major Industries Nil 12 No. of Medium / Small Scale Industries 1 13 No. of Bank 12 14 No. of Police Station 1

The entire ULB area is situated over 17 Revenue Villages consisting 20 nos. of Council Wards as noted below:

Ward No	Ward Name	Population	Literacy	Sex Ratio
1	Sandhapalli	1,256	76%	1,039
2	Sandhapalli	1,516	63%	982
3	Tanupur	1,187	86.2%	975
4	Tanupur	2,354	74.9%	1,038
5	Kasananta	1,622	83.5%	995
6	Kasananta	1,303	77.5%	1,042
7	Balipara (Part) Baladevnagar	1,722	82.5%	1,108
8	Balipara (Part)	1,939	86.3%	903
9	Nuagaon, Kakudipalli	1,611	67.3%	922
10	Pattamundai	1,875	77.4%	990
11	Pattamundai	2,021	70.6%	916
12	Baktarpur	1,860	78.4%	931
13	Praharajpur, Pokhariapara (Part)	2,175	80.5%	947
14	Pokhariapara (Part)	1,700	84.2%	908
15	Alva	1,688	75.9%	1,110
16	Matia (Part)	2,269	77.7%	941
17	Matia (Part)	1,573	65.3%	944
18	Tatana, Dakhinidia	1,630	77.9%	976
19	Baltal (Part)	2,200	82%	918
20	Beltal (part), Bandhapara	3.027	77.7%	929

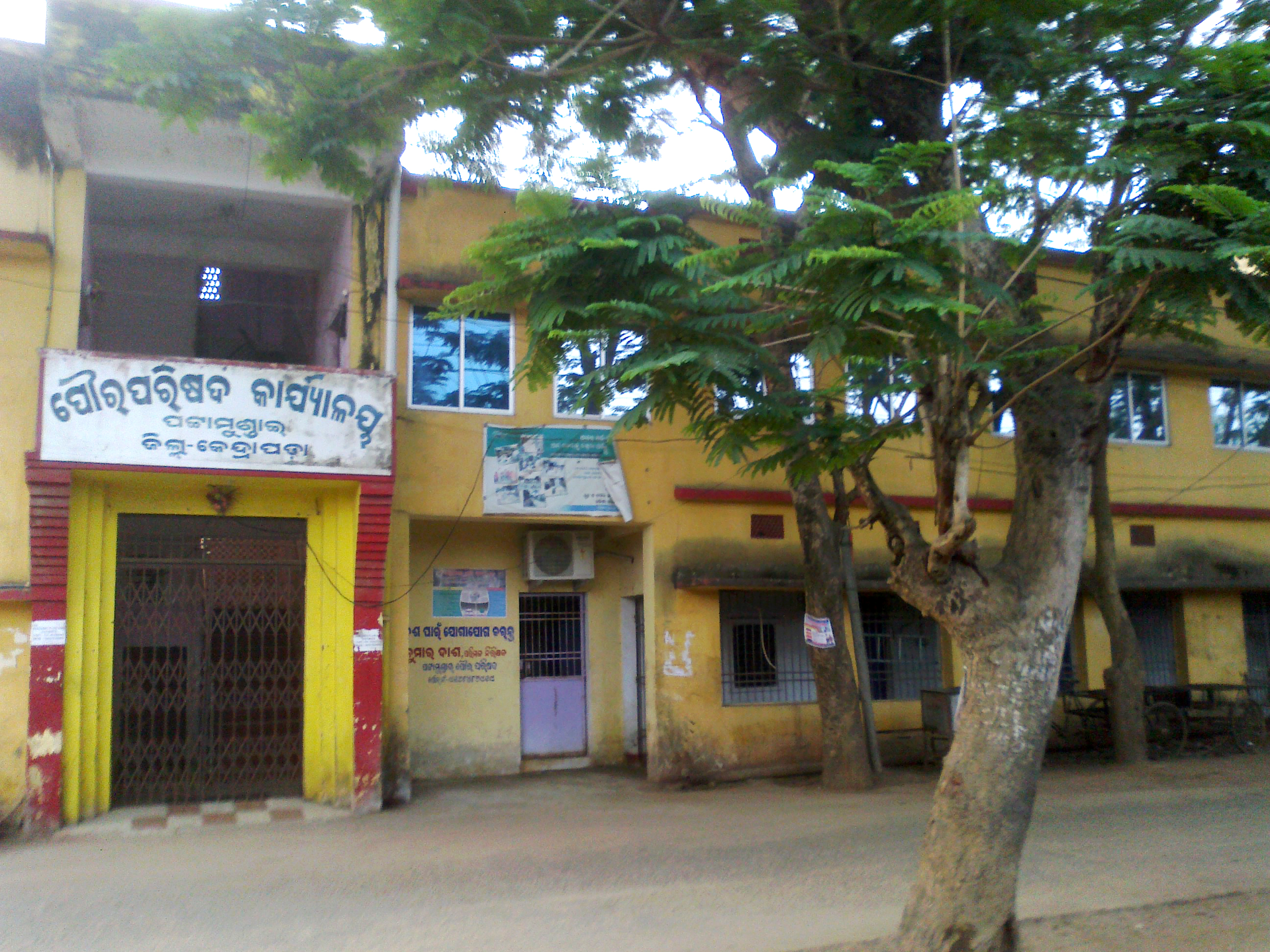
Office of The Municipal Chairperson

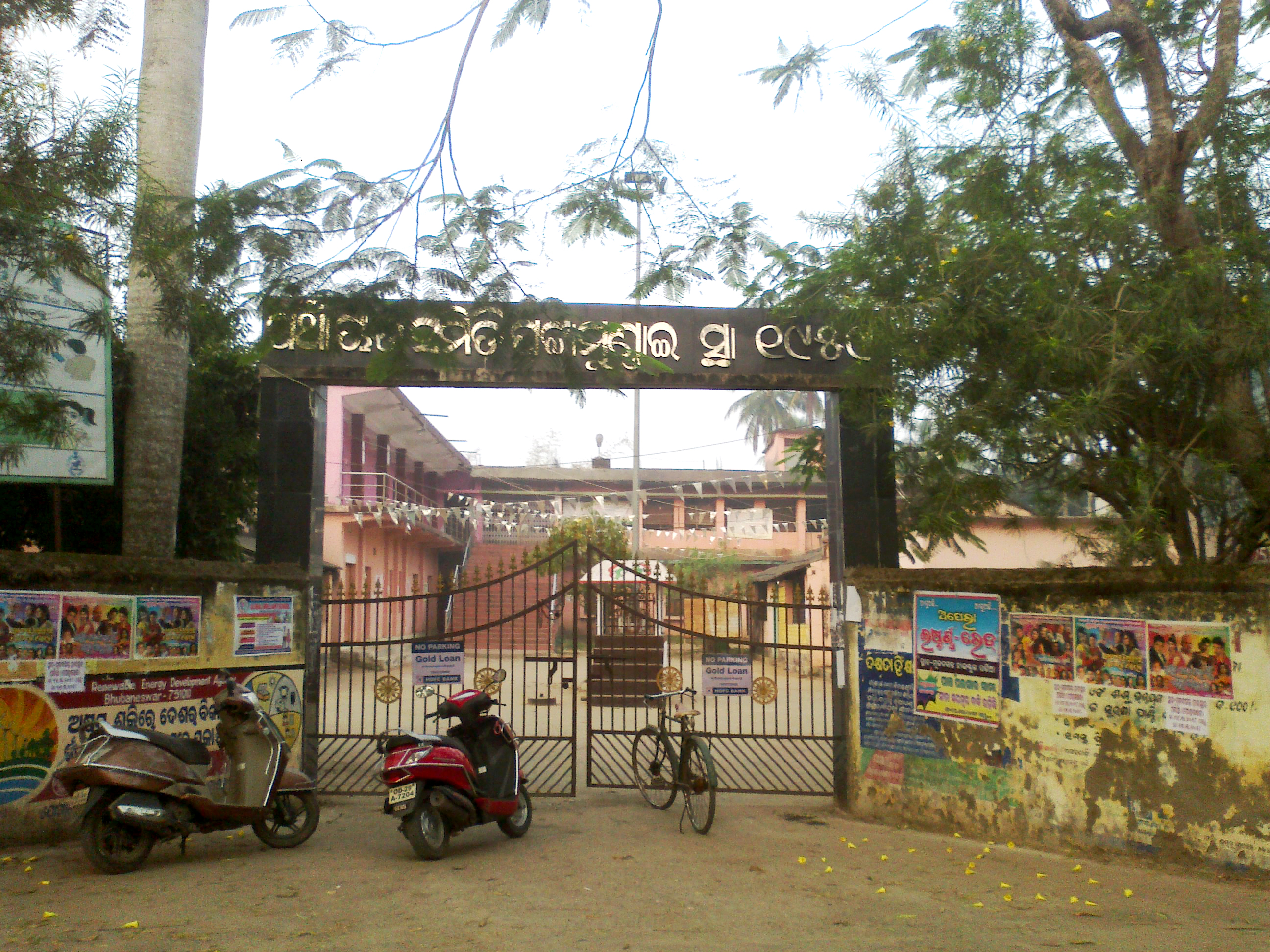
Office of The Block Development Officer

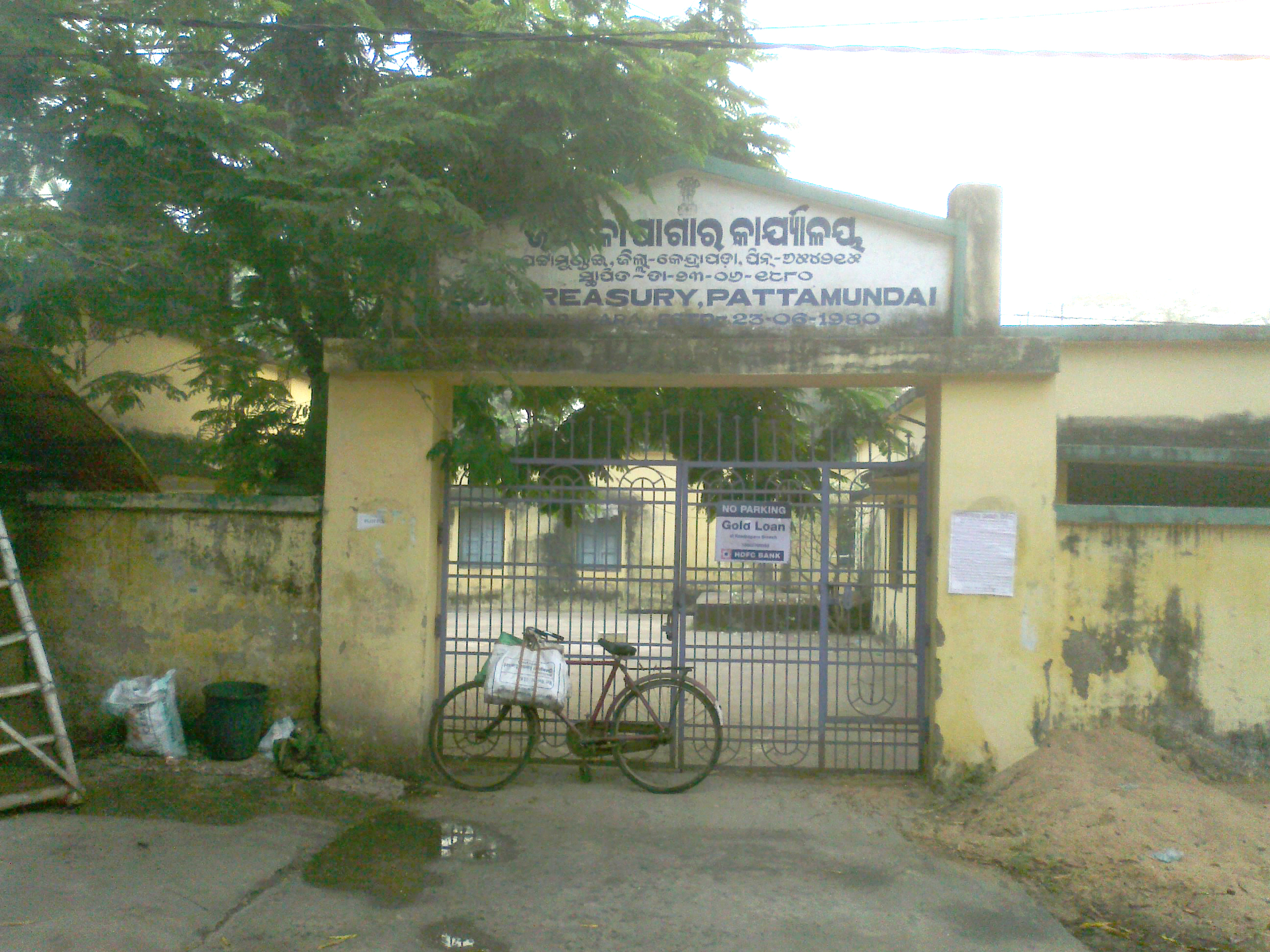
Sub-Treasury

Office Of The Civil Judge (Jr. Dn.) CUM J.F.M.C.

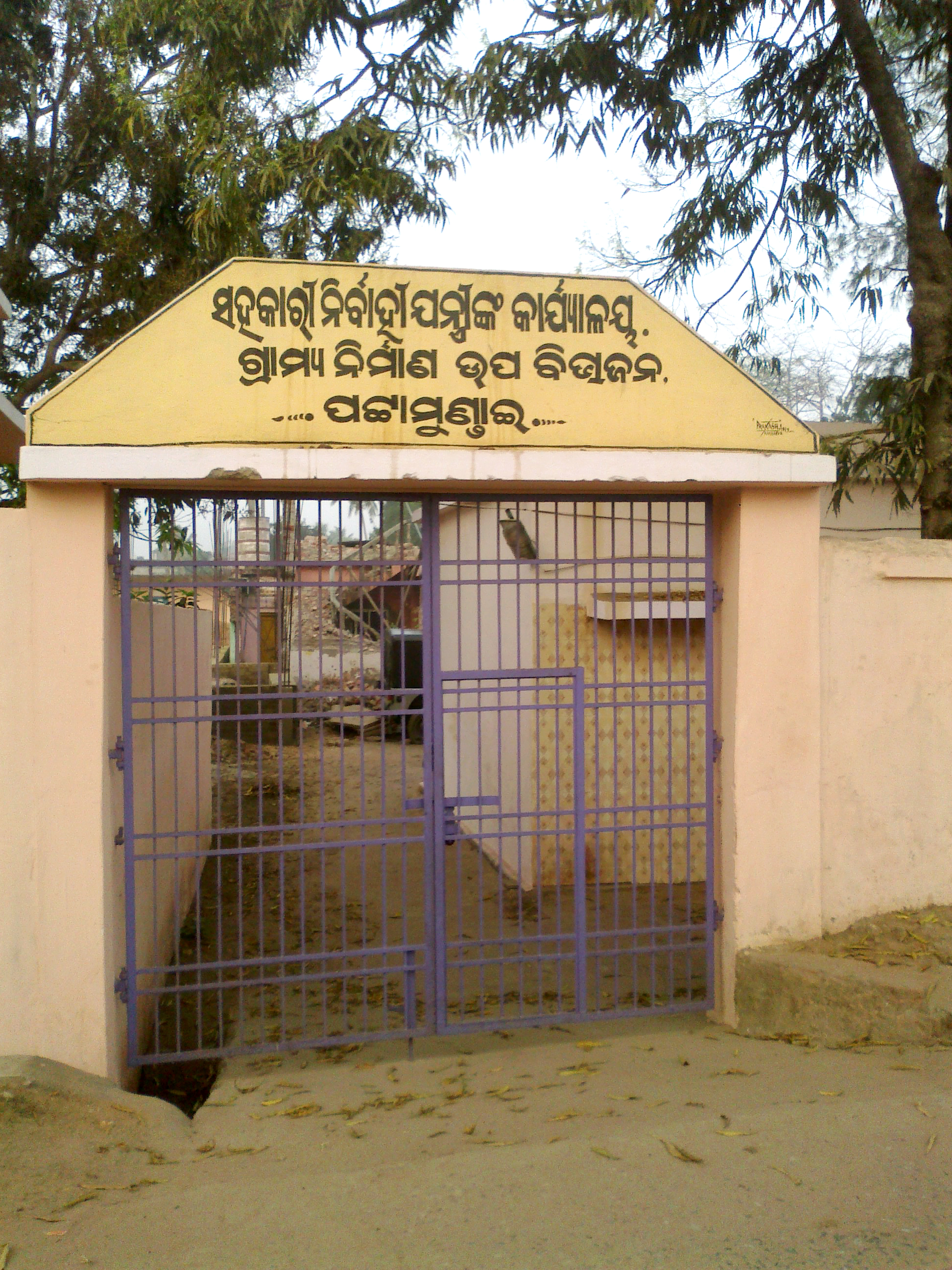
Office of The Executive Engineer, Rural Development Works

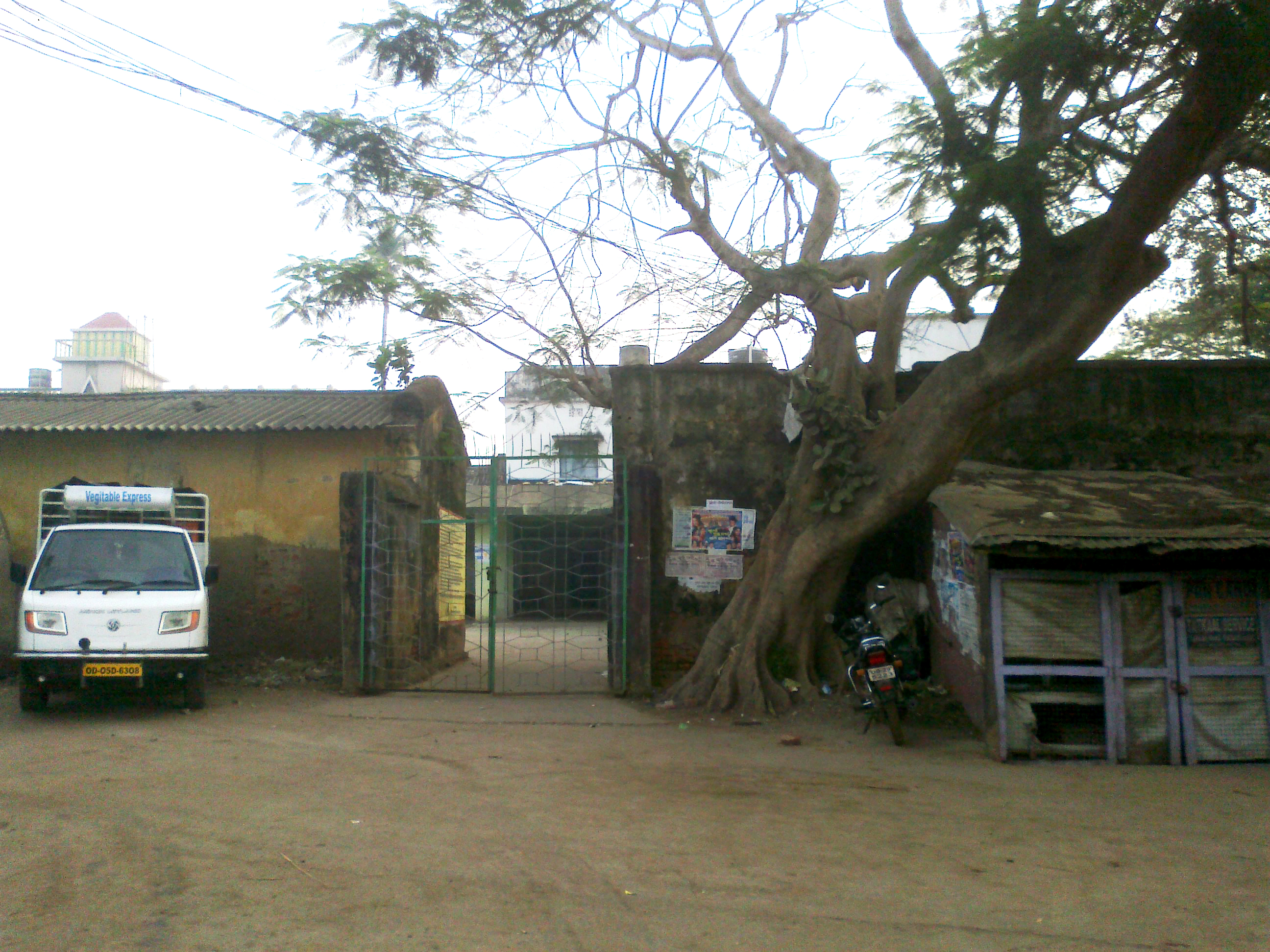
Office of The Tahasildar

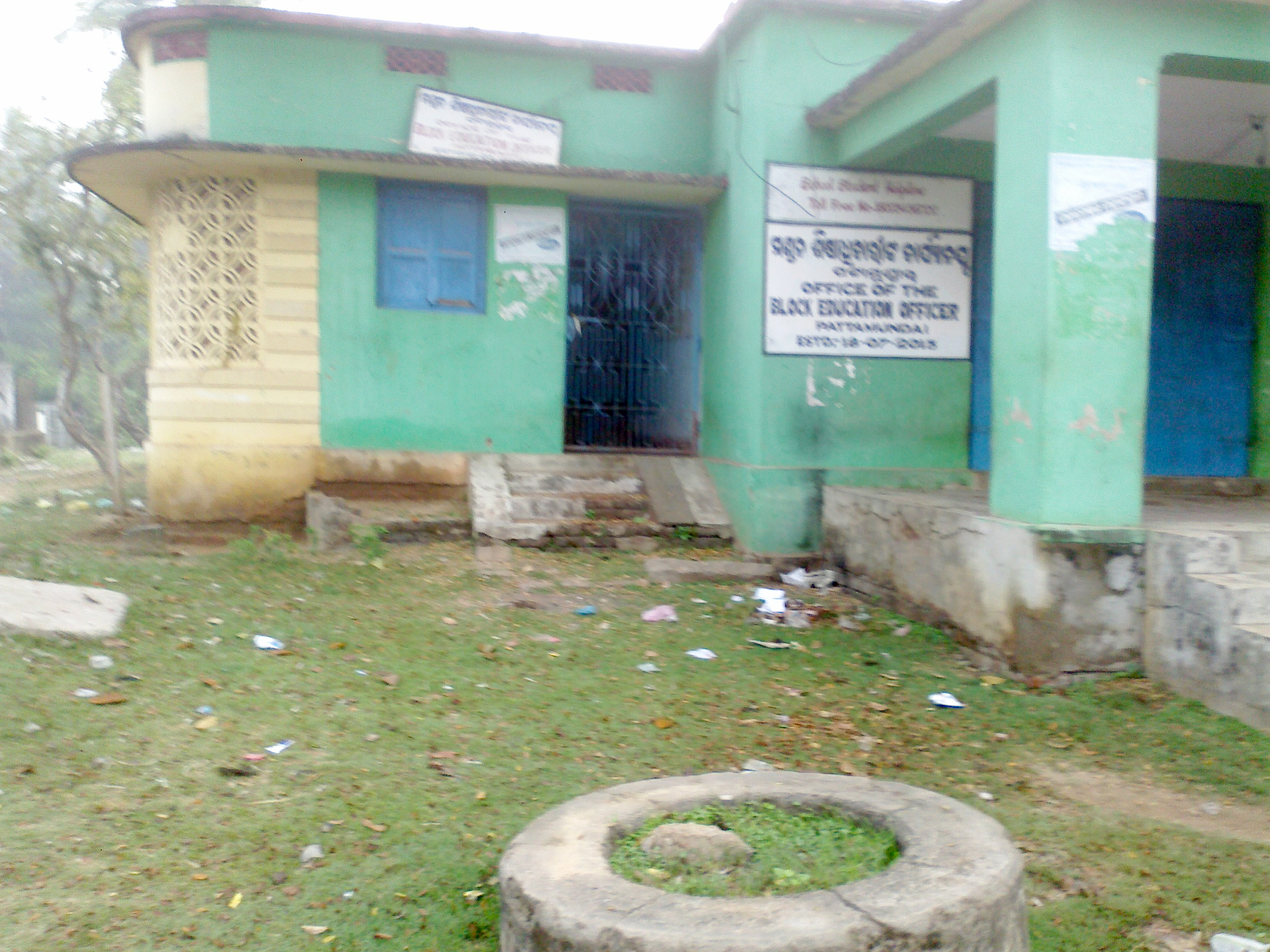
Office of The Block Education Officer

=== Politics ===
INC, BJD are the major political parties in this area. Pattamundai Tehsil comes under multiple assembly constituencies. There are total 2 assembly constituencies in Pattamundai Tehsil.

Constituency name	MLA name	Party
Kendrapara	Ganeswar Behera	BJD
Rajanagar	Dhruba Sahoo	BJD

Pattamundai Tehsil comes under Kendrapara parliament constituency and the current sitting MP is Baijayanta Panda.

== Economy ==
The economy is mainly agrarian. Most of the people are still dependent on agriculture as their primary source of income. There is a complete absence of Secondary and Tertiary Sectors, except a few rice mills, banks and schools. One has to become a migrant in some distant part to get a job. A large number of people from Pattamundai, Aali and Rajnagar blocks of the district attribute their prosperity to their expertise in plumbing. Around one lakh people of these areas work as plumbers in different States of the country and other parts of the world, especially the Middle East countries. They pump in money through remittance's which has increased the purchasing power of the people. Pattamundai Bazar (ପଟ୍ଟାମୁଣ୍ଡାଇ ବଜାର), which used to be a weekly market for selling agricultural products, is now a very big market where one can find everything for day-to-day usage. Pattamundai is mainly a market around which people live. More than 0.5 million people of Pattamundai, Rajnagar, Aali, Rajkanika blocks directly or indirectly depend on the Pattamundai Market for their daily needs, making it a first choice of investment. There are a lot of wholesalers in the market who also sell in small or single quantity.

=== Market ===
Pattamundai has a very big market and the city is settled around the market. The market is divided into many parts/bazaars(ବଜାର).

- Mahavir Bazar
- Laxminarayan Bazar
- Dasavatar Bazar
- Sarala Bazar(Medical)
- Bangalai Drgara Bazar (Hata|Daily Market)
- Haragauri Bazar
- Neelamadhab Bazar
- Gajanan Market
- Gayatri Bazar
- Laxmibarah Bazar
- Durga Bazar

== Education ==
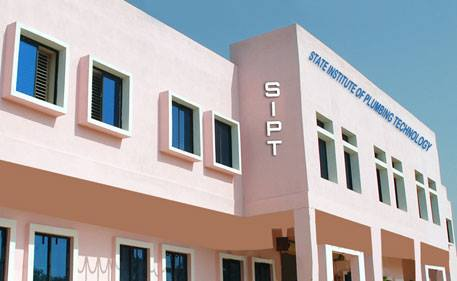
State Institute Of Plumbing And Technology (SIPT), Pattamundai.

=== Technical Colleges/Institutions ===
- Ramadevi School Of Nursing
- Pattamundai Industrial Training Center, Matia
- Radharaman Industrial Training Institute, Pattamundai
- State Institute Of Plumbing Technology (SIPT), Pattamundai

The town is home to the State Institute of Plumbing Technology, or SIPT, the only institute in the country dedicated to plumbing. Pattamundai's plumbers have migrated not only to most parts of India, but also to many different corners of the world, especially the Gulf countries and West Asia.

=== Graduation Colleges ===
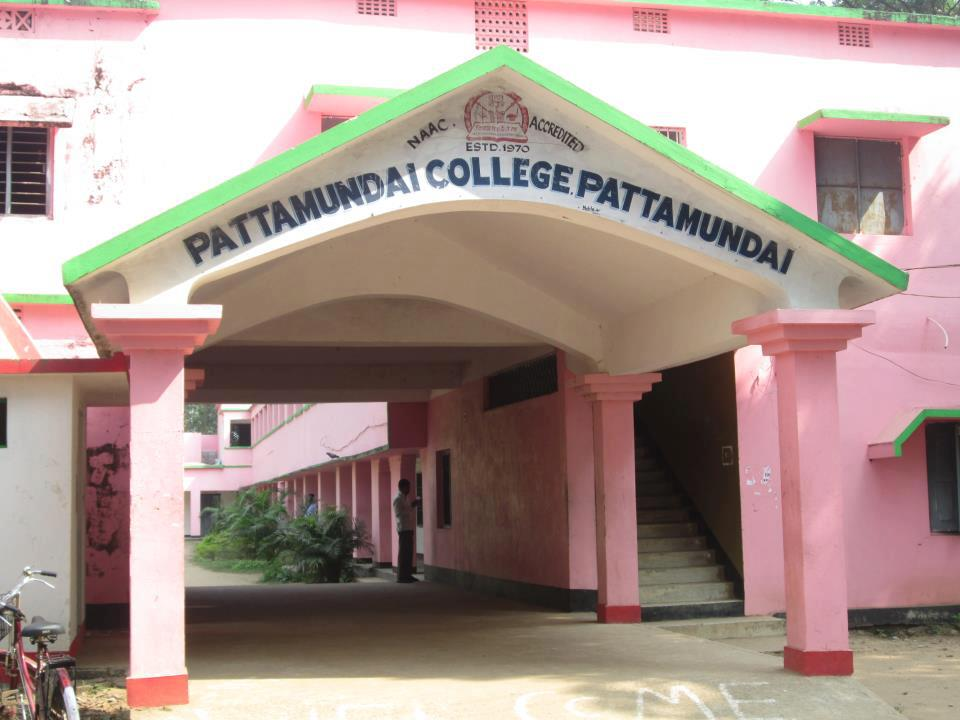
Pattamundai Junior and Degree College

- Pattamundai Junior and Degree College, Pattamundai
- Women's Junior and Degree College, Pattamundai

=== Schools ===
==== High schools ====
- M.N. High School, Ward No 13
- Govt Girls High School, Ward No 10
- Panchayat High School, Kasananta, Ward No 7
- Baktarpur High School, Ward No 12
- Hariharanadna Balashram, Arua

==== Primary & M.E. Schools ====
- Balipada Nodal U.P. School
- Pokhariapada Primary School
- Sararwati Sisu Mandira, Ward No- 13 Estd- 1996
- Venketeswar Public School, Ward No 18 Estd- 2007
- PATTAMUNDAI URDU P. S. School, Ward No 11 Estd- 1883
- DAKSHINADIA P.S. Estd- 1973
- MATIA U.G.U.P.S. Estd- 1986
- NEW SCHOOL, Ward No-15 Estd- 2008
- RADHARAMAN SANSKRIT VIDYALAYA, Ward No-19 Estd- 1927

==== Computer Institutions ====
In the 21st century, having computer knowledge is a foremost priority. Due to utter negligence of the Government, there has not been any development in the field of education from the Govt. So the private player took the opportunity and computer coaching centers spun up on the College Road.

- OIIT
- Jagannath Institute of Information & Technology (JIIT) ISO 9001:2015 Certified
- Apex Computers
- Smart Computer

== Transportation ==
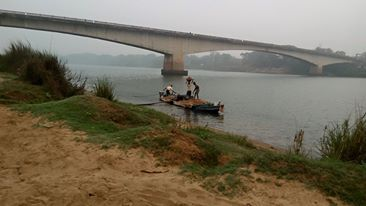
Patrapur Bridge on Brahmani River in Pattamundai along SH-9A

=== Road ===
The roads here are not enough & broad according to the demand. The dense population of the area and rampant temporary and some permanent encroachments of Government land had made the expansion of roads difficult. Pattamundai Canal Bridge (ପଟ୍ଟାମୁଣ୍ଡାଇ ବଜାର ପୋଲୋ) [20°34'58.7"N 86°33'42.6"E] is the oldest bridge connecting Pattamundai with Aali & Rajnagar. The concrete bridge was constructed after the wooden bridge was washed away during the heavy floods of 1961. There is a bridge on the Brahmani River at Patrapur (ପତ୍ରପୁର ପୋଲୋ) [20°35'53.3"N 86°35'23.6"E] which connects Pattamundai with Aali & Rajkanika. The bridge was completed during the 1970s. S.H- 9A which runs from Jagatpur(Cuttack) to Chandabali(Bhadrak) is the lifeline of Pattamundai. One can find buses to traverse either sides along SH-9A every 30 minutes and 15 minutes during peak hours from Pattamundai. Direct buses run to Rourkela, Sambalpur, Raipur and Kolkata from here. Pattamundai is connected to Jajpur via Aali, Singhpur & Binjharpur along the Brahmani River. Pattamundai and Rajnagar are 20 km apart and are connected by the MDR- 16. Pattamundai- Rajnagar Road is the main road route to and in the Bhitarkanika National Park Gupti Gate. Pattamundai is the only center where tourists stop by to collect food & drinks and have meals during their onward visit to Bhitarkanika National Park.

=== Rail ===
Thousands of people travel everyday to the state capital or Cuttack to board a train. The Indian Railways is now planning to build a railway station near Kendrapara. The nearest railway stations at present are :-

- Kendrapara - 21 km
- Dhanmandal (Chandikhol) - 60 km
- Jajpur Road - 76 km
- Cuttack - 77 km
- Bhadrak - 81 km
- Bhubaneswar - 106 km

=== Air ===
The nearest airport is Bhubaneswar - 104 km.

== Distance from surrounding Towns ==
There are a lot of buses connecting Pattamundai with nearby towns. The buses are generally offer non-AC and Delux/semi-Delux services. The cuttack-Chandbali route has buses in every 15 minutes.

- Kendrapara - 20 km
- Indupur - 18 km
- Rajnagar - 20 km
- Aali - 10 km
- Rajkanika - 24 km
- Chandbali - 30 km
- Dhamra - 57 km
- Paradip - 57 km
- Jajpur - 57 km

== Health ==
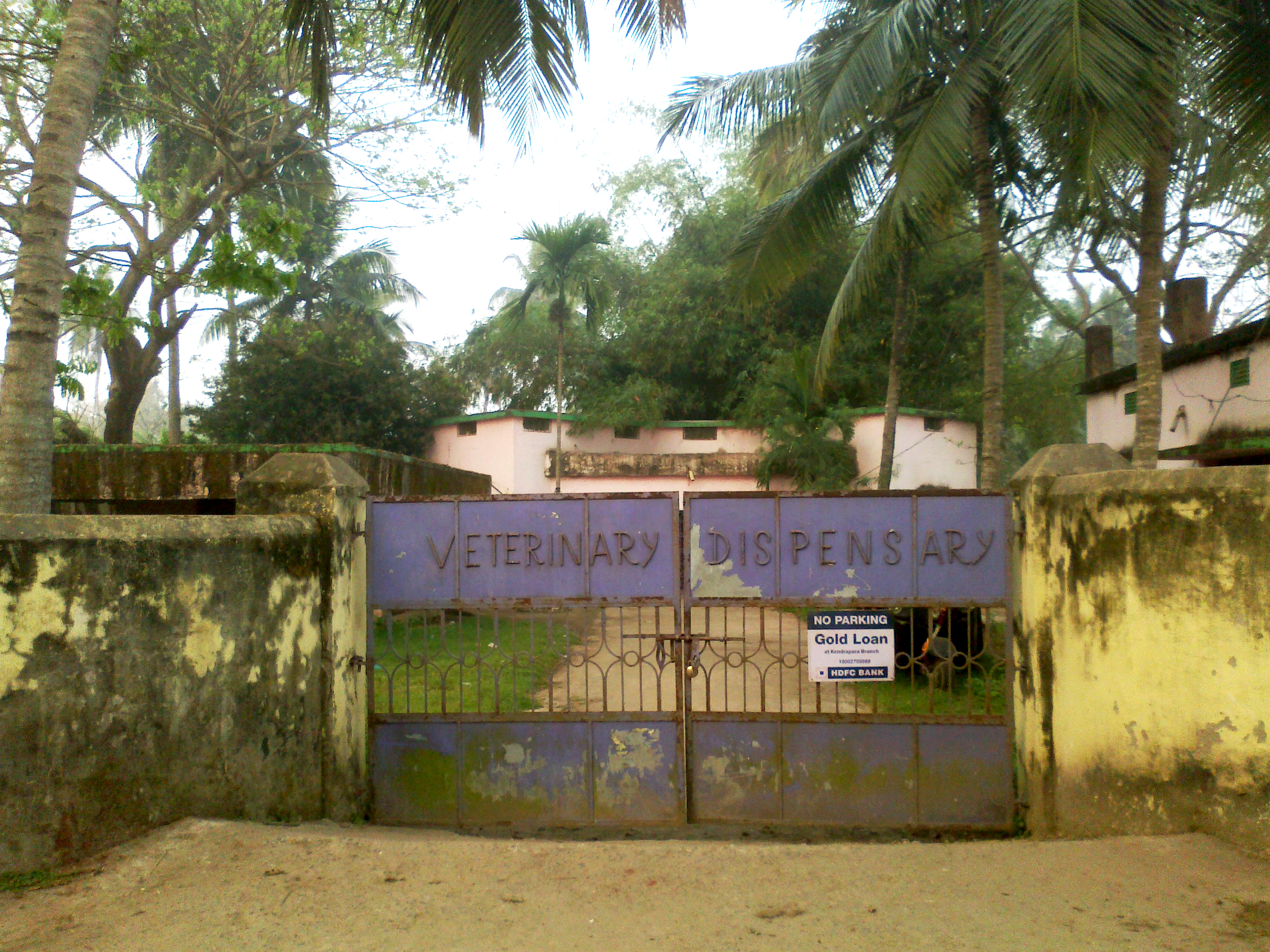
Government Veterinary Dispensary, Pattamundai

The Dispensary in Pattamundai was established in the late 19th century. Currently there is a Community Health Center for all the medical problems of the people of Pattamundai. There is a District Medical at Kendrapara for advanced treatment. Casualties are generally referred to Cuttack Medical.

There is also a Veterinary Dispensary.

=== Nursing Homes ===
Due to government apathy there is lack of healthcare facilities in the town. 2,00,000 people cannot meet their needs from a single Community Health Center with 2 doctors and 9 beds. Consequently, many private participants bring in visiting doctors from hospitals in the state capital and Cuttack.

- Aahan Hospital

== Temples & Mathas ==
Being a predominantly Hindu populated town, the town has temples of different Hindu Gods and Goddesses at every nook & corner. Here is a list of some of them :-

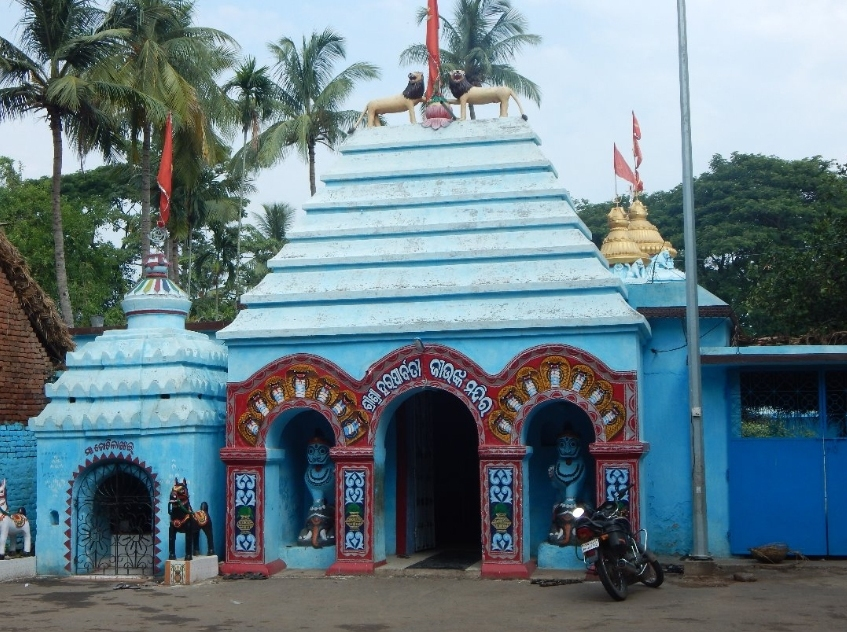
Harparbati Mandira

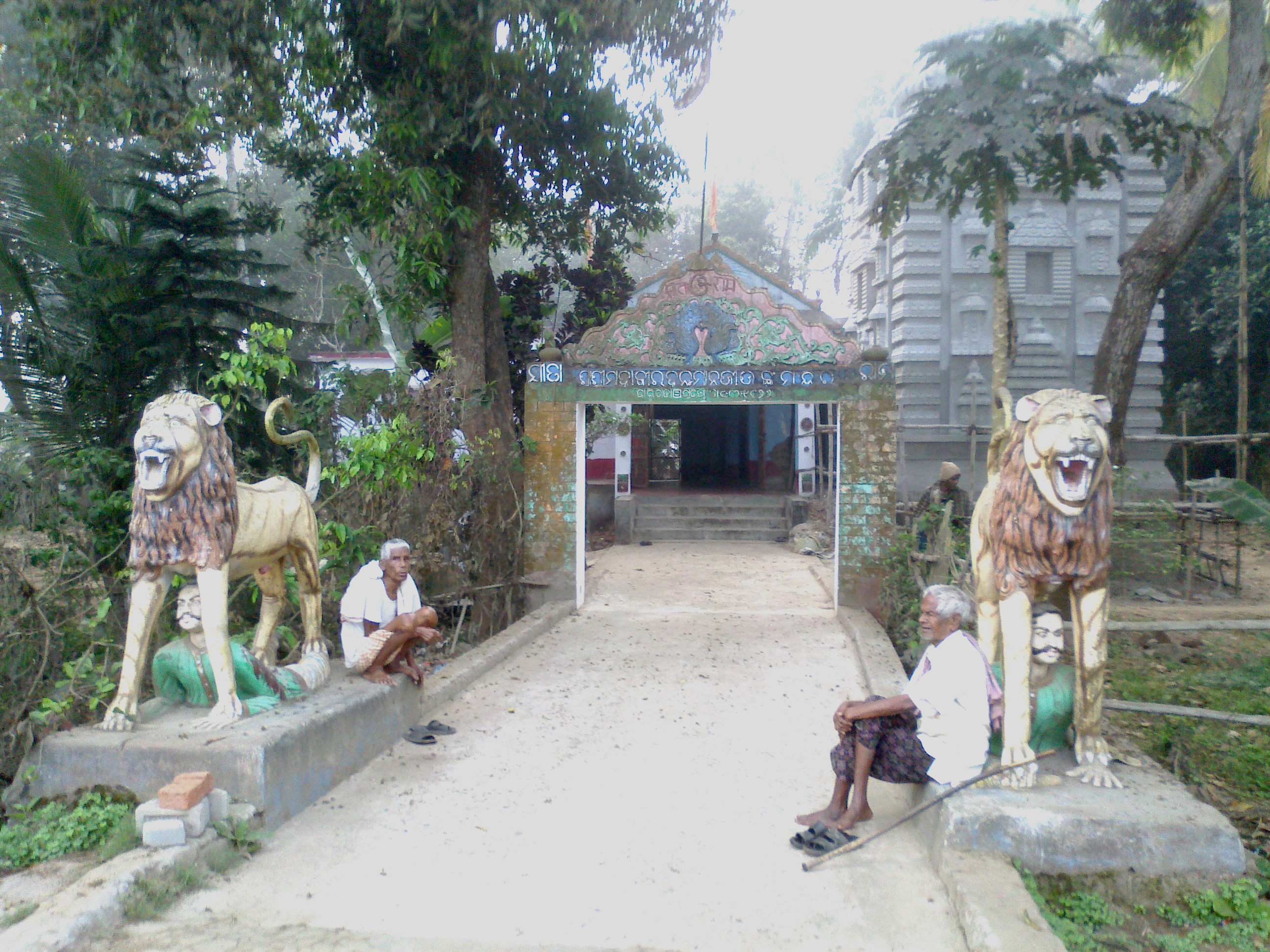
Mahabir Mandira

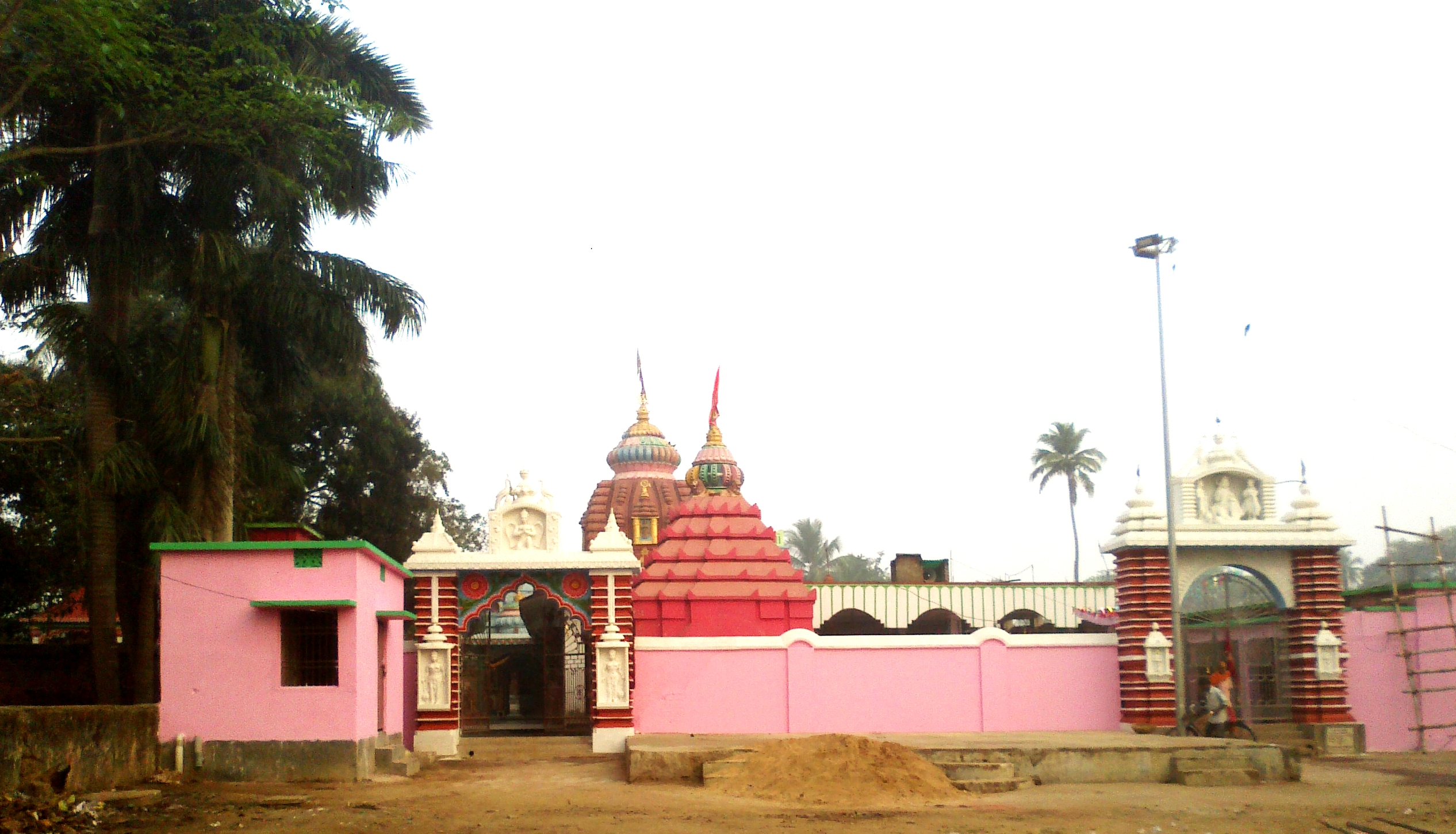
Shreeram Mandira

- Haraparbati Temple, Pokhariapada (ହରପାର୍ବତୀ ମନ୍ଦିର)
- Mahabir Tample, Balipada (ମହାବୀର ମନ୍ଦିର)
- Shreeram Temple (ଶ୍ରୀରାମ ମନ୍ଦିର)
- Sai Temple, Beltal (ସାଇ ମନ୍ଦିର)
- Chandramouli Temple,Chandan Nagar (ଚନ୍ଦ୍ରମୌଳି ମନ୍ଦିର)
- Lachhmanjew Temple, Balipatna
- Sahara Sundari Temple
- Hanuman Temple, Tanupur
- Kasananta Thakurani Mandir
- Siva Mandira, Kasananta
- Sai Temple, Mandapada
- Jagannath Temple, Mandapada (ଜଗନ୍ନାଥ ମନ୍ଦିର)
- Bhajaneswar Temple, Mandapada
- Maa Sarala Temple, Bachhara
- Patitapaban Temple, Pokariapada, (ପତିତପାବନ ମନ୍ଦିର)
- Maa Dhanagayi Thakurani Temple, Baktarpur Chak
- Bholi Baba Matha (ଭୋଳିବାବା ମଠ)
- Radharaman Matha
- Maa Budhi Baigani Pitha (ମା ବୁଢ଼ୀ ବାଇଗଣୀ ପୀଠ), Gobindpur

== Places Of Interest ==
- Chandramouli Temple,Chandan Nagar (ଚନ୍ଦ୍ରମୌଳି ମନ୍ଦିର)
- Bhitarkanika National Park 45 km
- Panchamukhi Hanuman Temple (ପଞ୍ଚମୁଖୀ ହନୁମାନ ମନ୍ଦିର) in Sansarfal
- Kanika Palace is a massive palace constructed by King of Kanika. It was constructed on an area of 4 acres of land and height of the structure is of 75 feet. It is situated in Rajkanika Block. 23 km
- Laxmi Baraha Jew Temple, Aali 14 km
- Aali Palace is situated near Aul township. It is an ancient palace spread over 40 acres of land. 15 km

== Recreation and Entertainment ==
There is an old cinema hall in Pattamundai. Besides, patrapur Bridge over the Brahmani River is also a favorite place for recreation during dusk.

== Telecommunication & Broadband ==
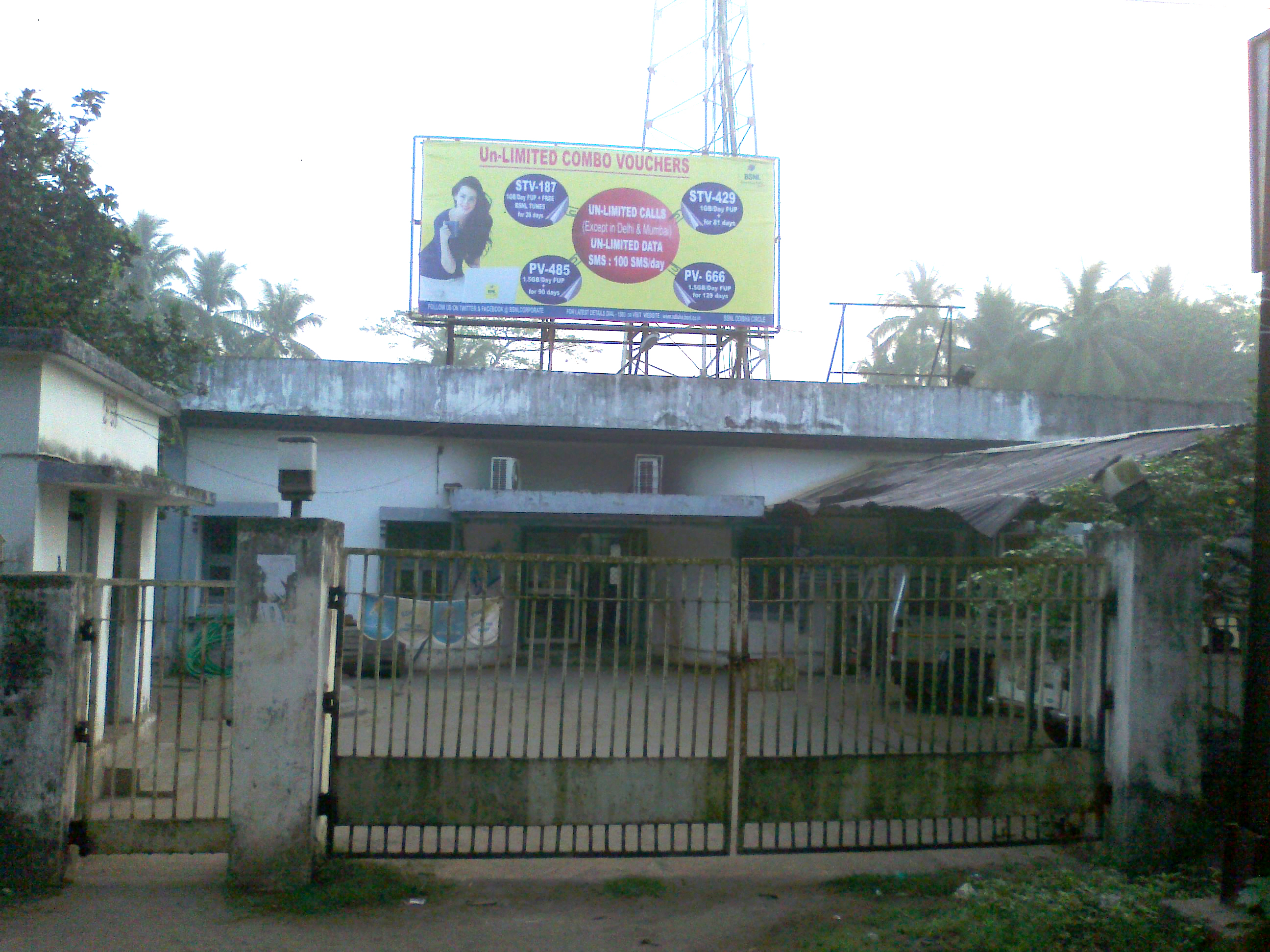
BSNL Telephone Exchange

BSNL is the only Landline telecom operator in Pattamundai. Pattamundai comes under Cuttack Telephone Exchange. It is the only broadband Internet Service Provider (ISP). All major mobile telecom operators are present in Pattamundai. Television Services are completely digitized in Pattamundai by Ortel.

== Notable personalities ==
The following are a selected notable people who were born or have spend a major part of their life in Pattamundai.

- Sarat Nayak - Music composer & Ollywood Singer
- Radhakanta Sethy - Politician & Trade Unionist

== See also ==
- Kendrapara
- Bhitarkanika National Park
- Laxmi Baraha Jew Temple
- Aali Palace
- Brahmani River
