= Aali Palace =

Palace in Odisha, India

Aali Palace ଆଳି ରାଜବାଟୀ
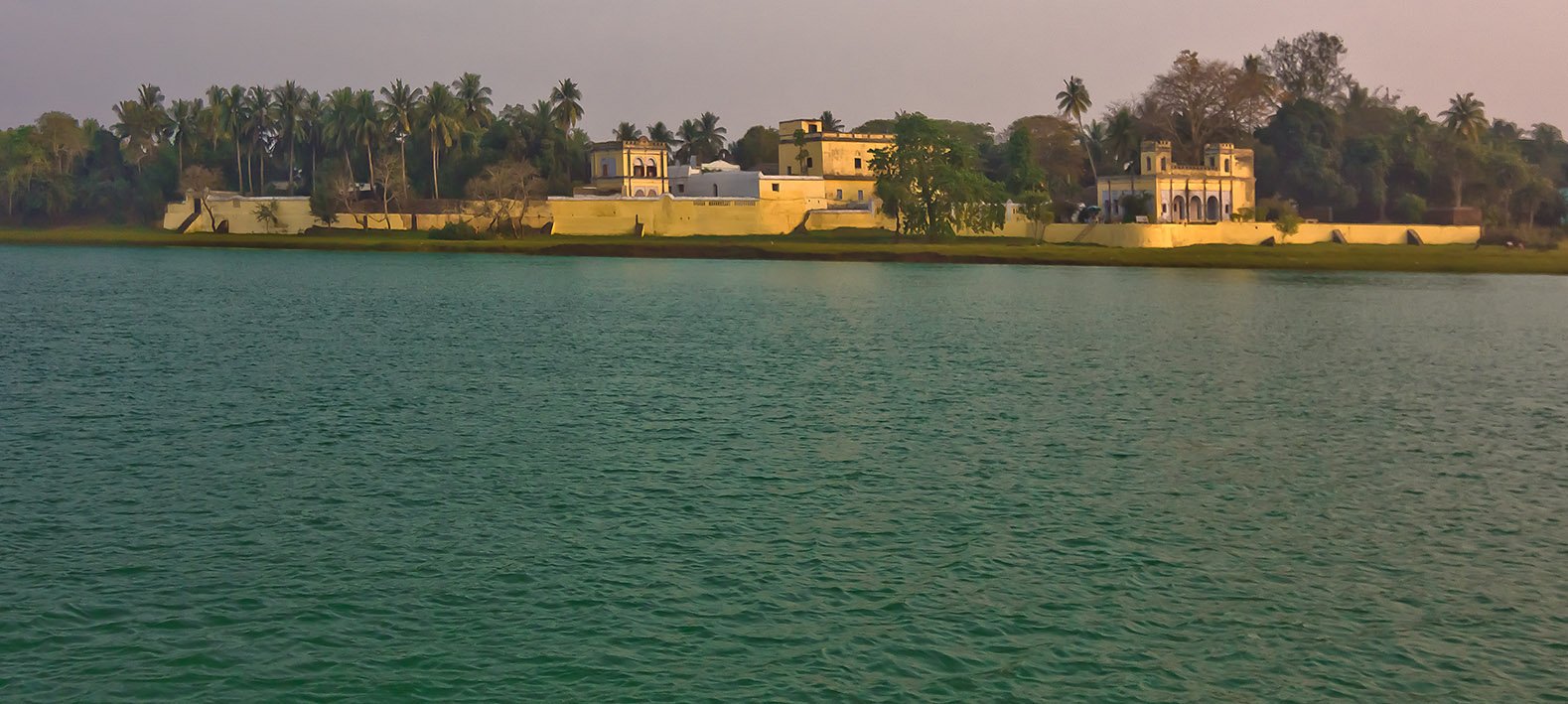
- Aali Palace, Odisha

- Location within Odisha
- Interactive map of the Aali Palace ଆଳି ରାଜବାଟୀ area

General information
- Location: Aali, Odisha, Kendrapara, India, Aali, Odisha, India
- Coordinates: 20°41′28.00″N 86°38′57.60″E
- Current tenants: Raja Braj Kesari Deb (Raja of Aul)

Website
- https://killaaulpalace.com/

Aali Palace (Odia: ଆଳି ରାଜବାଟୀ) is situated near Aali, Odisha, Kendrapara, India. It is the official palace of the Deb dynasty, who ruled there from 1590 A.D.

In 2018, a plan to turn a wing of the palace into a heritage hotel was initiated by members of the Aul royal family.

== Nearby tourist spots ==
- Kanika Palace
- Bhitarkanika National Park
- Lakhmi Varaha Temple
- Akhandalamani Temple

== See also ==
- Pattamundai
- Kendrapara
