= Kanika Palace =

Palace in Rajkanika, India

Kanika Palace କନିକା ରାଜବାଟୀ
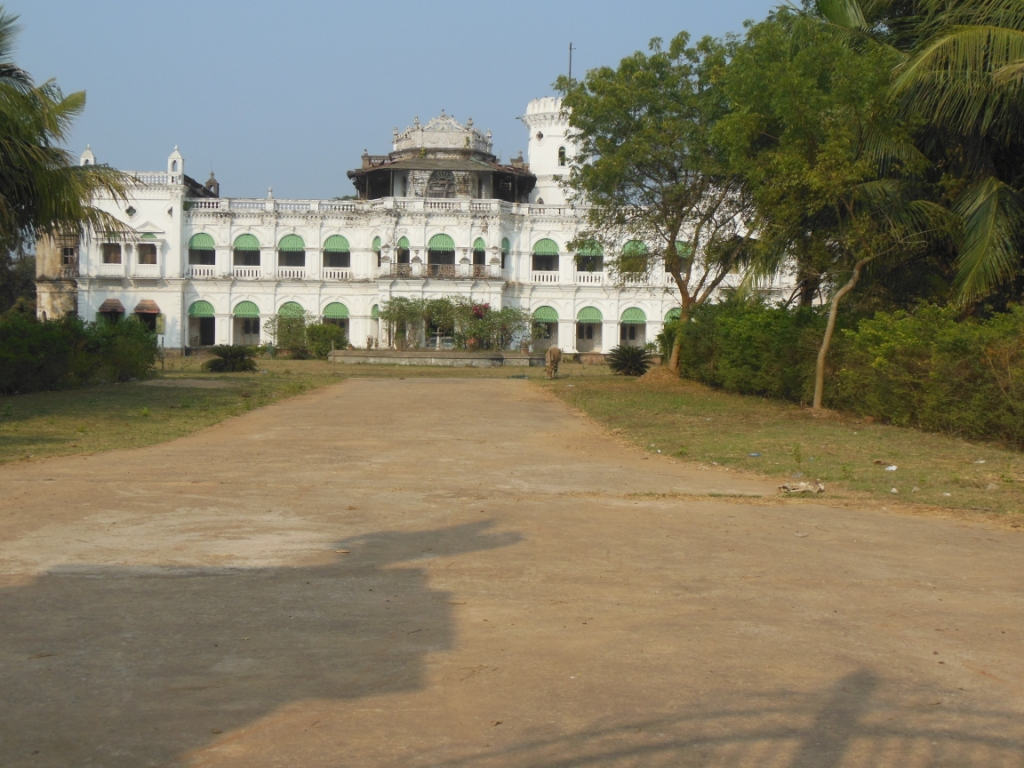
- Kanika Palace, Odisha

- Location within Odisha

General information
- Location: Rajkanika, Kendrapara, India, Rajkanika, India
- Coordinates: 20°44′05.6″N 86°41′59.4″E

Kanika Palace (Odia: କନିକା ରାଜବାଟୀ) is situated near Rajkanika town. It is 125 km from Bhubaneswar. One of the floors has been converted into a museum. It is home to the world's biggest crocodile skeleton.

== Nearby tourist spots ==
- Aali Palace
- Bhitarkanika National Park
- Lakhmi Varaha Temple
- Akhandalamani Temple

== See also ==
- Rajkanika
- Aali, Odisha
- Pattamundai
- Kendrapara
