= Aali, Odisha =

Aali Aul
- Town
- Location in Odisha, India Aali (India)
- Coordinates: 20.67°N 86.64°E
- Country: India
- State: Odisha
- District: Kendrapara

Government
  - Block Chairman: Manoranjan Samal

Area
  - Total: 224.45 km^{2} (86.66 sq mi)
- Elevation: 21 m (69 ft)

Population (2011 [Actual Numbers Might Be Much Higher])
  - Total: 139,628
  - Density: 622.09/km^{2} (1,611.2/sq mi)

Languages
  - Official: Odia
- Time zone: UTC+5:30 (IST)
- PIN: 754219
- Telephone code: 06729
- Vehicle registration: OD-29

Aali previously Aul is a town and the headquarters of Aali CD Block and Aali Tehsil in Kendrapara district in the Indian state of Odisha. It is 17 km from Chandabali. Aali is surrounded by the river Kharasrota and Brahmani on north and south respectively. To its east is Bhitarkanika National Park.

== History ==
Aali has a clear history and heritage. This state is an outcome of the war between the Chalukyas and Bhoivanshis for the throne of Utkala at Kataka. The ancestors of Aali royal family belonged to the last independent Chalukya king Gajapati Mukunda Deva. Gajapati Mukunda Deva ruled Odisha for 16 years, from 1559 to 1567. He traced his descent to the Eastern Chalukyas of Vengi and was known in Odishan traditions as Telinga Mukunda Deva, as per his temple inscriptions his father and grandfather’s names are mentioned as Saravaraju and Singaraju.

When Gajapati Maharaja Prataparudra Deva of Suryavamsha dynasty died in 1540 his minister Govinda Vidyadhara played foul and started conspiracy against Kalua Deva Allias Ramachandra Deva-I and Kakharua Devs alias Purusottama Deva-II, the two legal heirs of Gajapati Maharaja. They were killed by him in 1541.

After this incident, minister Gobinda Bidyadhara acquired the throne at Kataka and founded the Bhoi dynasty, he ruled till 1548. In the meantime Gobinda's nephew Raghubhanja Chhotraya created chaos and attacked Gobinda to get the throne but could not succeed. During this period, Utkala was also threatened by the Afghans of Bengal. Govinda’s son Chakrapratapa became the King from 1548 to 1557 and after Chakrapratapa, Raghuram Ray Chotaraya and Narasingha Ray Jena ruled Utkala till 1559.

In 1559, Mukunda Deva, the Army chief of Bhoi rulers ascended the throne after assassinating the last Bhoi rulers through treachery and started his reign in the name of Chalukya Gajapati Mukunda Deva.

However Mukunda Deva got caught up in the politics of Bengal, and gave shelter to Ibrahim Shah Suri who was an enemy of Karrani dynasty, subsequently Sulaiman Khan Karrani attacked Odisha and in the battle that ensued Mukunda Deva was killed, Odisha was annexed to Karrani dynasty, in the aftermath of these events Mughal general Man Singh I drove out the Afghans from Odisha and ended the Karrani dynasty rule, Odisha was annexed to the Mughal empire. There arose a dispute between the sons of Mukunda Deva Chalukya and Ramachandra Deva I (son of Danai Vidyadhara of Bhoi dynasty) for the throne of Utkal, Man Singh settled the dispute by giving the dominion of Khurda adjoining various zamindaris and the administration of Jagannath temple of Puri to Ramachandra Deva I of Bhoi dynasty while Aul was given to the sons of Mukunda Deva Chalukya. Thus, Ramachandra Deva I of Bhoi dynasty continued as a subordinate king under the Mughal empire.

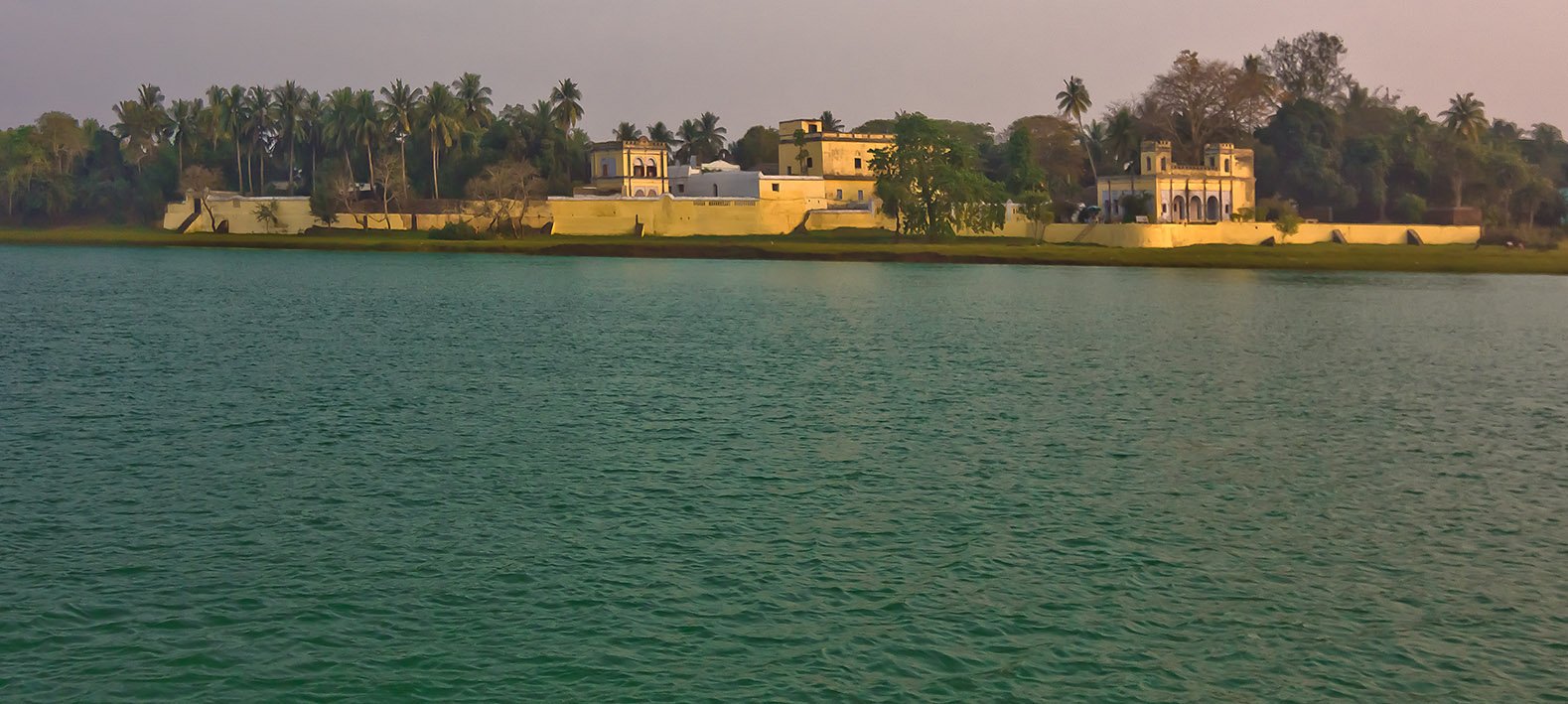
Aul Palace from river view

== Education ==
=== Colleges ===
- Aul College, Aul
- Laxmi Barah College, Ayatpur
- Olaver College, Olaver
- Debaray Samarsingh College, Ganeswarpur
- National ITC., Aul
- Gandhi Memorial College, Gobindpur

=== High schools ===
- Hadua Up School
- Godabarisha Bidyabhaban, Gobindpur
- C.P.B.E.T. High School, Tunga
- Sarat Kumar Dev High School, Giribandha
- Aul High School
- Samant Singhar Kelu Charan High School, Patrapur
- Panchayat Sitaram Bidyapitha, Manikapatana
- Damodar High School, Ayatpur
- Chakradhar High School, Dahisahi
- Nrusinghajew A.D.M High School, Aragal Sasan
- Namouza High School
- Batipada High School
- Rameswar Nial GP High School, Chhotanathpur Sasan
- G.D. High School, Sanamanga
- Utkalmani Uchha Bidyapitha, Atal
- Mahu High School
- Chandiagari High School
- D.P.S. High School, Padanipal
- Dadhibamanjew Bidyapitha, Desahi
- Manapur High School
- Janata High School, Palimi
- Mohanpur Ganeswarpur High School
- Panchayat High School, Sahira
- S.C. High School, Madhuban
- Janakalyan High School, Kusumi
- Athapatana Binapani High School, Dasipur
- Sahadev Girls High School, Demal
- Ekamania U.G. High Schools.
- Govt. U.G. High School, Chandan Nagar, Kolidiha
- Gopabandhu Girls High School, Hinjal
- Sansidha High School
- Panchayat Girls High School, Desahi
- Mendhapur G.P. High School, Padanpur
- Odisha Adarsh Vidyalaya, Belasarpur, Nial, Aul
- Balakati Panchayat High School, Balakati

== Transportation ==
=== Road ===
SH-9A from Jagatpur, Cuttack to Chandabali passes through Aali. It connects it with Pattamundai and Rajkanika on either sides. The Manpur-Singhpur Road connects Alli with Jajpur. Another road connects Aali with SH-35 at Aradi, Bhadrak. It is also has a network of roads interconnecting the villages.

=== Rail ===
There is no railway station near to Aul in less than 10 km. However Cuttack RailWay Station is major railway station 87 km near to Aul. A newly constructed rail link from Paradip to Haridaspur is at final stage.

== Distance from surrounding towns ==
- Hadua - 15 km
- Rajkanika – 11 km
- Pattamundai – 14 km
- Rajanagar - 35 km
- Dhamra - 54 km
- Dhamarai Temple - 50 km
- Chandabali- 17 km
- Akhandalamani Temple- 20 km
- Jajapur – 45 km
- Kendrapara-35 km
- Bhadrak – 57 km

== Health ==
Aul block has one Community health Center at Aul and PHC(N)'s at Batipara, Dasipur, Govindpur, Mahu, Palimi, Sanamanga.

== Law and order ==
The Court of Judicial Magistrate, First Class was established at Aul in 2011.

== Politics ==
Aul (98) is one of the five Assembly Constituencies of Kendrapara parliamentary constituency. It consists of Aul and Kanika Block with 315 polling stations and 237969 voters.

- Odisha Vidhan Sabha in 1961 in the midterm election : Raja Sailendra Narayan Bhanjdeo, Aul (INC)
- 4th Bidhan Sabha (1967–71) : Dibakar Nathsharma Aul (INC) Total Votes : 73890 Part Won : Congress Votes Secured: 15049
- 5th Bidhan Sabha (1971–73) : Sharat Kumar Deb Aul Swatantra Total Votes : 81617 Part Won : Swatantra Votes Secured:
- 6th Bidhan Sabha (1974–77) : Sharat Kumar Deb Party: Independent % of Votes: 34.08
- 7th Bidhan Sabha (1977–80) : Sharat Kumar Deb Party: Janata Dal % of Votes: 57.02
- 8th Bidhan Sabha (1980–85) : Sharat Kumar Deb Party: Janata (S) % of Votes: 52.00
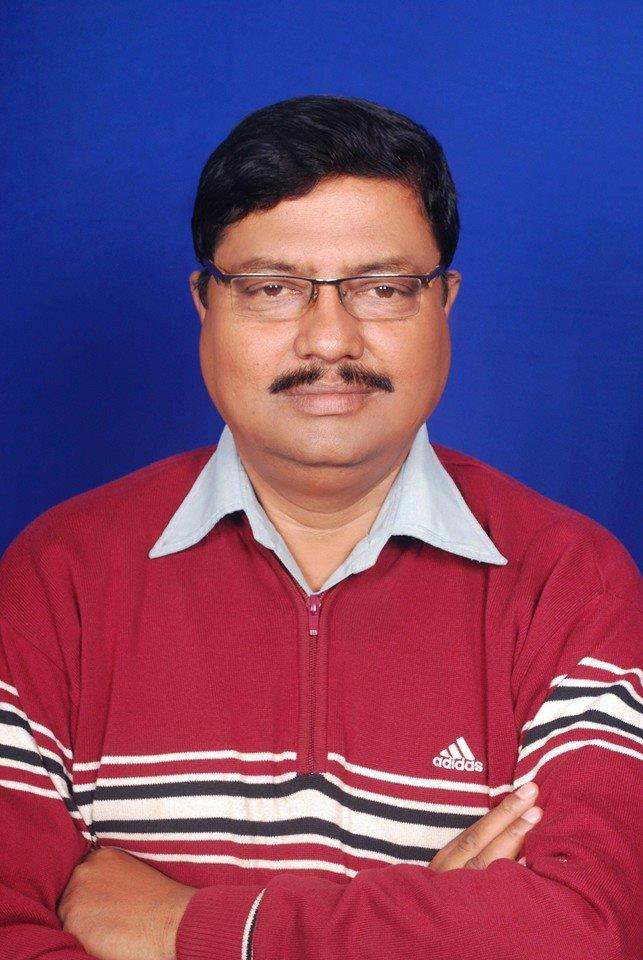
- Current MLA of Aul
  9th Bidhan Sabha (1985–90) : Dolagovinda Nayak Party: Congress (I) % of Votes: 52.01
- 10th Bidhan Sabha (1990–95) : Smt. Sushree Devi Party: Janata Dal % of Votes: 56.61
- 11th Bidhan Sabha (1995–2000) : Dolagovinda Nayak Party: Congress(I)
- 12th Bidhan Sabha (2000–04) : Pratap Keshari Deb Party: BJD % of Votes: 59.50
- 13th Vidhan Sabha (2004–09): Pratap Keshari Deb Party: BJD No of Votes Secured: 61,869
- 14th Vidhan Sabha (2009–14): Pratap Keshari Deb Party: BJD
- 15th Vidhan Sabha (2014–19): Devendra Sharma Party: INC
- 16th Vidhan Sabha (2019–24): Pratap Keshari Deb Party: BJD

Aul Tehsil comes under Kendrapara parliament constituency and the current sitting MP is Baijayant Panda.
