= Kataka Chandi Mandir =

Hindu temple in Odisha

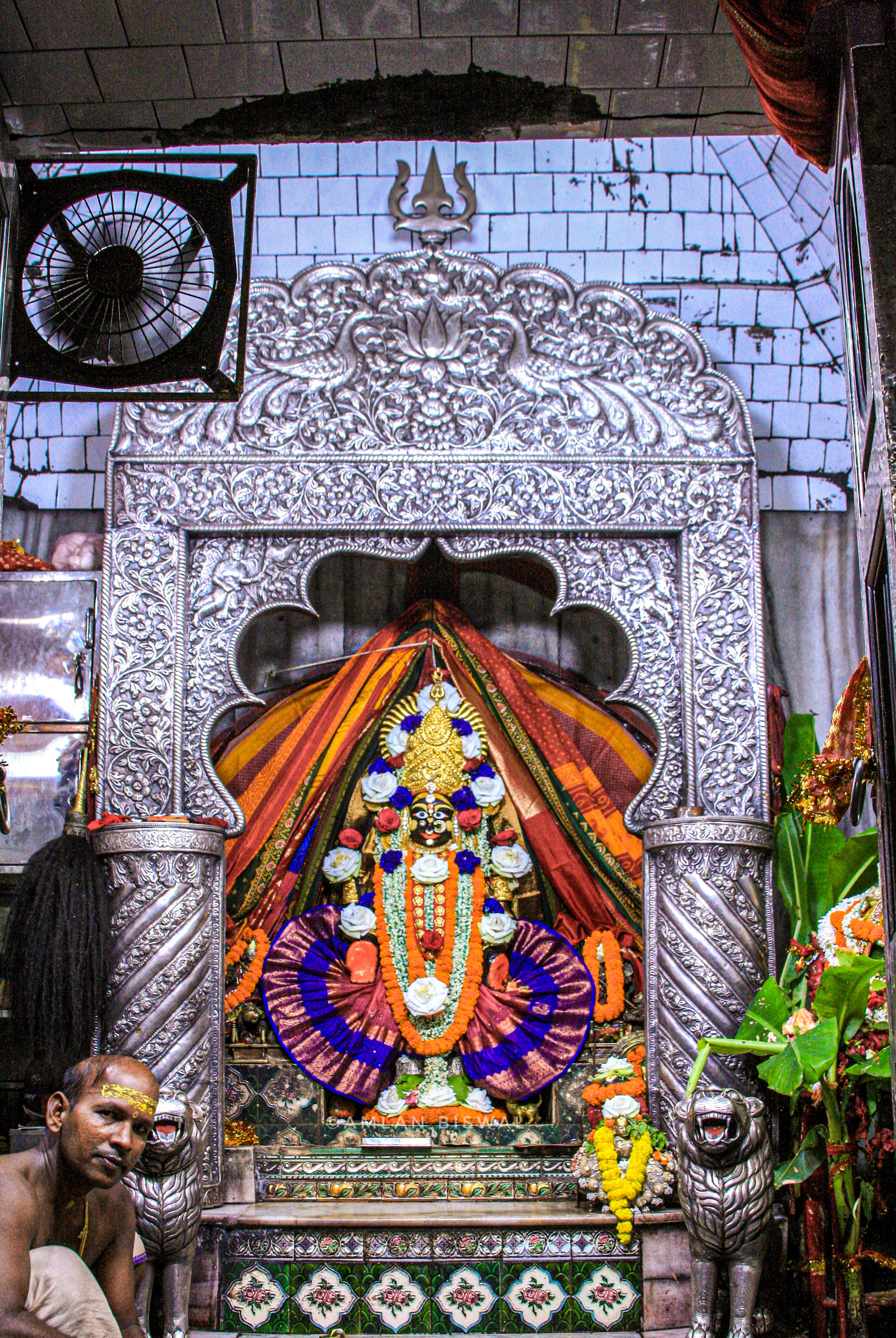
- Maa Kataka Chandi

- Odisha

Religion
- Affiliation: Hinduism
- District: Cuttack

Location
- State: Odisha
- Country: India
- Coordinates: 20°28′38.08″N 85°51′45.23″E

Website
- www.maacuttackchandi.in

Kataka Chandi Mandir is a temple dedicated to the Hindu goddess Chandi in Kataka, Odisha, India, near the banks of the Mahanadi River.

== History ==
It is said that the present land, where the sacred temple stands, was previously idle. Hansa Panda, who happens to be the Purohit of the then King of Kanika, used to graze cattle and sheep there. Once, while grazing cattle and feeling tired, Panda took a rest on a pile of dry mud on that place. While taking rest, he experienced a strange divine feeling within himself. Surprisingly that same night, in his dream the Goddess Chandika appeared and asked him to take her out from the land. The next morning, he went to the king and told everything about the strange experience he had last night. With the help of the king and the local public Hansa Panda dug the same piece of land. It is said that around forty bullock carts carrying Red Sindur first emerged during the digging process, followed by the idol of Maa Chandi. On that plot of land stood a Babul tree, and it was there that Hansa Panda began worshipping Maa Chandi, with financial support from the King of Kanika. There after the temple was built on the same land. In Kataka, residents hold Maa Kataka Chandi as The Living Goddess in high regard. Daily, the temple of Maa Kataka Chandi, the city's principal deity, attracts hundreds of pilgrims. The deity's image predates the temple, as evidenced by its age. It is believed that she served as the family deity for the Gajapati rulers during the medieval era, due to Islamic invasions, she was subsequently buried while the kings moved to Puri.

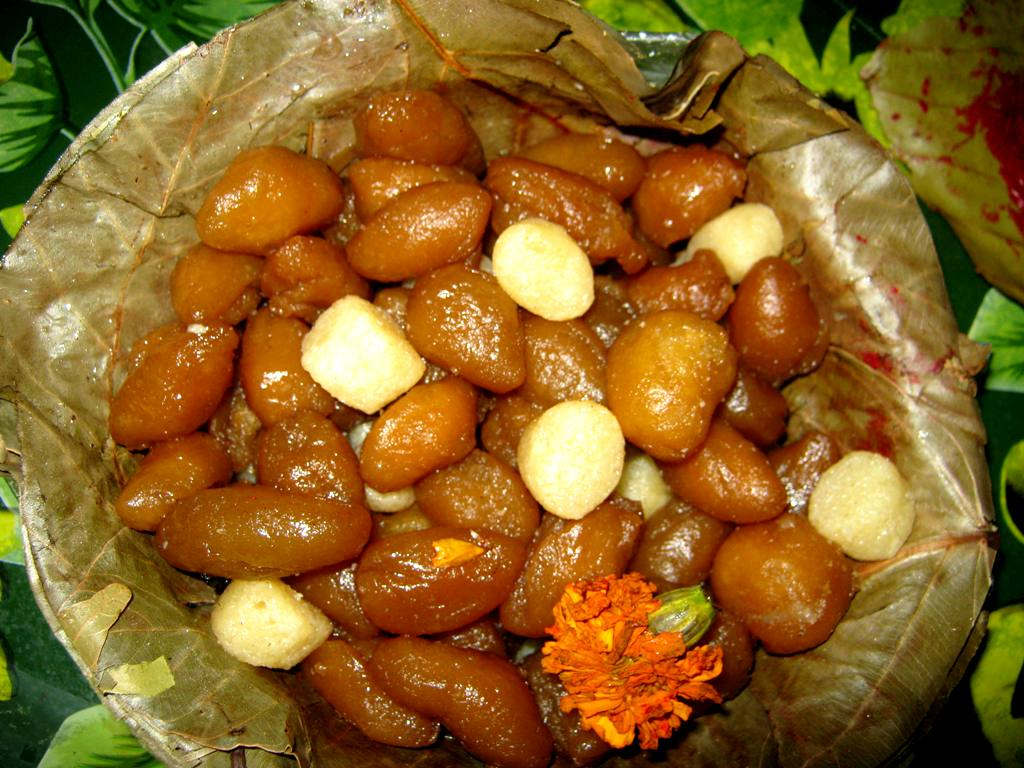
Prasad Of Maa Kataka Chandi

== Festivals ==
Dashahara and Kali Puja are two prominent festivals observed in here. During Pana Sankranti (Odia New Year), the mother goddess ornated with golden ornaments.

== See also ==
- Chandi Devi
- Chandi Mandir, Chandigarh
- Chandi Devi Temple, Haridwar
