= Operation Oliver =

Operation Oliver is a 2013 project started by the Indian Coast Guard in Odisha. This project was made for the olive ridley sea turtle, an endangered species who migrate to the Gahirmatha Marine Sanctuary.
