= Lakhmi Varaha Temple =

- ଶ୍ରୀ ଶ୍ରୀ ଲକ୍ଷ୍ମୀ ବରାହ ଜୀଉ ମନ୍ଦିର
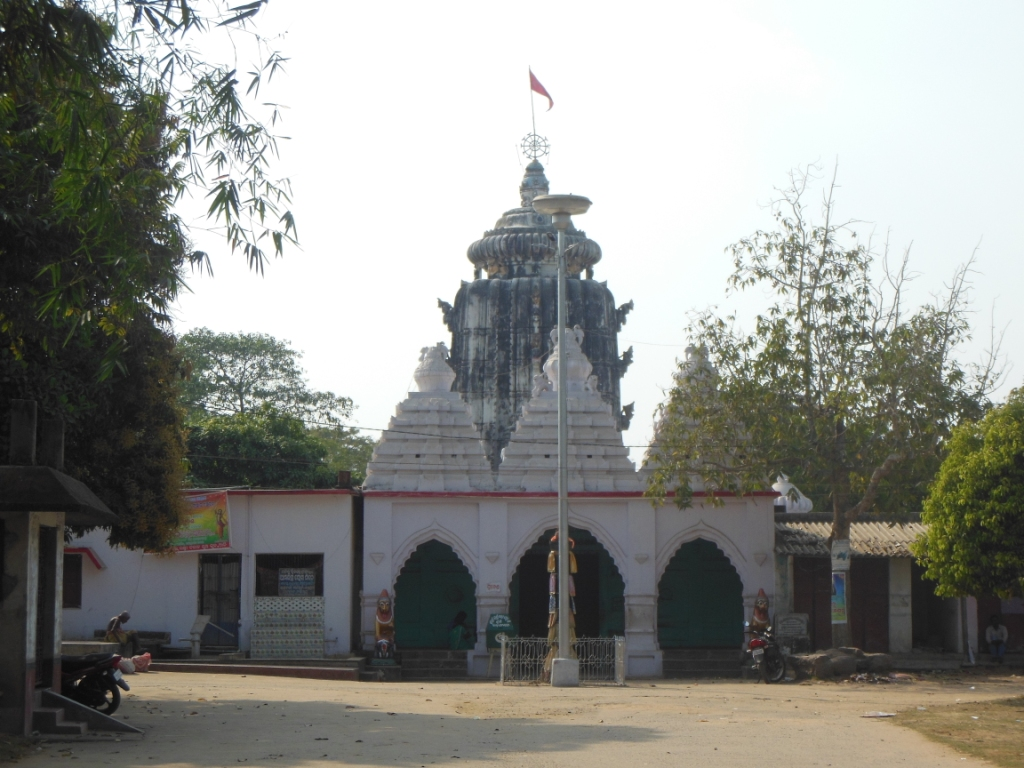

- Location within Odisha

Religion
- Affiliation: Hinduism
- District: Kendrapara
- Deity: Varahajew (Vishnu)
- Festival: Rath Yatra And Baraha Jew jayanti.

Location
- Location: Aul
- State: Odisha
- Country: India
- Interactive map of Lakhmi Varaha Temple
- Coordinates: 20°41′03.1″N 86°38′45.5″E

Architecture
- Type: Kalinga architecture (Deula)
- Creator: Created By the family of king of Aul.
- Completed: 1550

Sri Sri Lakshmi Varaha Swamy Temple (Odia: ଶ୍ରୀ ଶ୍ରୀ ଲକ୍ଷ୍ମୀବରାହ ସ୍ବାମୀ ମନ୍ଦିର) is a 500-year-old Indian temple dedicated to Varaha, the boar incarnation of Vishnu.

== Location ==
The temple is located in the Indian state of Odisha, in the Kendrapara District. Brahmani River is the nearest river. The temple is about one kilometre away from the center of tehsil Aul, which is situated about 146 km from the state capital of Bhubaneswar. It is 17 km from Pattamundai and 38 km from Kendrapara. Regular bus services are available from Kendrapara, Cuttack, Bhadrak and Bhubaneswar. The nearest railway station is Bhadrak, on the Chennai–Howrah railway route.

== Legend of Varahajew ==
The king of Aul was a devotee of Lakshmi-Varaha. The deity was in the Biraja Temple in the Jajpur District, along with Yajna Baraha Temple and the king often went there to offer Puja, which is a Hindu act of worship. One day during the month of Shraavana, the Baitarani River flooded, so the darśana was cancelled. Believing that the deity couldn't tolerate that, the king dreamed that the deity came with him to his place to Aul (locally called Alli). One day the deity came, following the king's path of return, after puja. As the king was returning by horseback, he listened to the sound of the deity following him. At Aul the sound of the deity's walking stopped. In this place, the devoted king built the deity's holy temple. The Yajna Baraha Temple remains there in Jajpur. The present temple was renovated by the late king of Aul, Sri Brajasundar Dev during the 20th century, after the temple had been in a ruined state for the previous 500 years.

== Festivals ==
- Baraha Dwadashi, Avatara divas of baraha on Maagha shukla dwadashi gathers a lakh of devotees from around the area.
- Baraha Dola Yatra, the swing festival during Phalguna or Holi.
- Raja Parva
- Vijaya Dashami
- Kumar Purnima
- Kartik Purnima
- Ratha Yatra
- Bakula Amawasya
- Samba Dasami
- Makara Sankranti
- Pana Sankranti
- Subha Sunia

== See also ==
- Bhitarkanika National Park
- Akhandalamani Temple
- Srimushnam
- Aali
- Pattamundai
- Kendrapara
