= Mahanadi Vihar =

Residential area in Cuttack, Odisha, India

Coordinates: 20°27′53″N 085°54′55″E

Mahanadi Vihar is a residential area in Cuttack, Odisha, India. It is situated in a tongue of land formed by the Mahanadi River and National Highway 16. The area is named after the river and comes under the control of the CDA (Cuttack Development Authority). Schools, a college, hospitals, temples, parks, playgrounds, markets and banks can be found there and Dussera and Puja take place there.

It is well connected by rail and road services with the nearest railway station being Cuttack (1.5 km (0.93 mi)) and nearest bus stand is at Shikhar Pur, OMP (50 m (160 ft)). By road it is 25 km (16 mi) from Biju Patnaik Airport (Bhubaneswar Airport).

Located close by are Shri Ramachandra Bhanj Medical College, Gurudwara GuruNanak Datan Sahib (KaliaBoda), Katak Chandi Temple, Barabati Stadium and Ravenshaw University. For last few years the local Puja Committee has won the "Best Disciplined Committee" award presented by the Cuttack Municipality Corporation (CMC) from among 100 Puja committees.

Most of the people living in Mahanadi Vihar are government employees (doctors, engineers, lawyers, Central and State Government employees) along with a few businessmen and executives from the private sector.
