= Namatara =

Coordinates: 20.714915°N 86.582050°E

Namatara is an Indian village situated in the Kendrapara district of Odisha. It is located on the bank of Kharosrota river, 150 km away from Bhubaneswar, the capital of Odisha. It is under the Rajkanika block and Aul tehsil. This village is approximately 22 km from Rajkanika. It is a habitat for 3601 people according to the 2011 census of India. This village has higher literacy than the state as it has 78.13% in compared to 72.87% of Odisha. It has 4 schools including high school and middle schools.
