= Gahirmatha Marine Sanctuary =

Wildlife sanctuary in Odisha, India

- IUCN category IV (habitat/species management area)
- Location within Odisha Location within India
- Interactive map of Gahirmatha Marine Sanctuary
- Location: Odisha, India
- Nearest city: Chandbali
- Coordinates: 20.57°N 86.84°E
- Area: 1,435 km^{2} (554 sq mi)
- Established: 1997

Gahirmatha Marine Sanctuary is a marine wildlife sanctuary in the Indian state of Odisha, extending from the Dhamra River mouth in the north to the mouth of Brahmani river in the south. It is the world's largest and most important nesting beach for olive ridley sea turtles.
