= Balipada =

Village in Odisha, India

Coordinates: 21.057522°N 85.835181°E

Balipada (also known as Balipada) is a village of Jajpur District. It is located at the south eastern part of Jajpur district. It is about 80 km far from the Biraja Khetra and about 80 km from district town.
