= Rameswarpur =

- Village
- Location in Orissa, India
- Coordinates: 20°52′42″N 86°27′25″E
- Country: India
- State: Odisha
- District: Bhadrak

Languages
  - Official: Oriya
- Time zone: UTC+5:30 (IST)
- Vehicle registration: OR-
- Nearest city: Bhadrak

Rameswarpur is a village near Dhamnagar in Bhadrak district of Odisha, India. This settlement is on the banks of River Genguti, and was initiated about four centuries ago during the reign of Mughal Emperor Akbar by the Bengali "Ghosh Mahashays" who migrated from Kotrung, West Bengal to permanently settle here, having come as a part of the contingent of Todarmal during his famed survey of India with Shri Chaitanya Dev of India.

This small village in Orissa, Bhadrak district, also boasts of conducting the oldest consistent Durga Puja on record anywhere in the world, which started with the first of the Mahashays. Before the concept of Sarvajanin Durga Puja started, it was being conducted by princely houses. It was started by the Bengali Mahashay family (Roy family,) which migrated from Kotrung ( present-day Uttarpara Kotrung. ) Kotrung is situated in the Hooghly district of West Bengal (according to Todarmal's survey.)

The Mahashays, who were Zamindars, gradually lost hold of the land they once owned. However, they continue the Puja as a part of their centuries old tradition. The family has direct bloodline relates to luminaries like the Bengali poet and essayist Annada Shankar Ray, whose father moved to Dhenkanal, also in Orissa, following a family feud. The Mahashays were famous for benevolent activities.

The Village also conducts the "Raksha Kali" Puja ( a very common Puja in Bengali households.) This was initially conducted by the Mahashay family but was later converted to "Sarbajanin" (the public sphere,) in spite of the fact that the Roy family did not approve of the very large number of animal sacrifices which were being performed by the surrounding villagers during the Puja. The 500-year-old Durga Puja of the Mahashays is still being organised by the Roy family.

In the 2011 consensus, the village consisted of 4,821 people, half of whom were male and half of whom were female. 511 were children ages newborn thru 6. The census found that the literacy rate in the village was lower than average in West Bengal, with male literacy higher than female literacy. Much of the employment in the village revolves around cultivation and agriculture.
