= Rajkanika =

- Town
- Location in Odisha, India Rajkanika (India)
- Coordinates: 20°43′30.7″N 86°42′26.9″E
- Country: India
- State: Odisha
- District: Kendrapara
- Tehsil: Kanika

Area
  - Total: 263.49 km^{2} (101.73 sq mi)

Population (2011)
  - Total: 138,979
- Time zone: UTC+5:30 (IST)
- Postal code: 754220
- Vehicle registration: OD-29
- Website: odisha.gov.in

Rajkanika is a town and block of Kendrapara district in the Indian state of Odisha.

== Geography ==
Rajkanika is surrounded by rivers on three sides, the rivers are Brahmani, Baitarani, and Kharashrota. It is the north end block of Kendrapara district and nearer to Bhadrak and Jajpur District. Its northern end starts from village Gualigan and ends at Bharigada village in the south and starts from Jayanagar in the east to Gopalpur in the west.

== Demographics ==
Odia is the official and spoken language at Rajkanika. The total population of Rajkanika is 1,38,979 consisting of 66,579 males and 72,400 females (all rural). There are 29 Gram Panchayats and 6 R.I. Circles and 168 (156 inhabited and 12 uninhabited) villages in Kanika Tehsil. Total Number of Households is 24523. Total literacy in Kanika Tehsil is 1,05,731 (77.12%) including 53,565 (86.83%) males and 52,166 (68.55%) females. Scheduled Castes in Kanika 31,859 with 15,629 males and 16,230 females. Population in the age group of 0-6 is 16,226 of which 8,346 are males and 7,880 are females.

== Education ==
- Pegarpara Nodal High School, Rajkanika, Kendrapara. https://pegarparanodalschool.com/
- S.N. College, Rajkanika
- Olaver College, Olaver
- Kapileswar College, Katana
- Rajendra Narayana Government High School, One of the oldest schools of Odisha established in 1918 by Raja Rajendra Narayan Bhanjadeo

== Tornadoes ==
The block was severely hit by the March 31 tornado of 2009, killing several people across 11 villages.

== Health ==
Rajkanika block has one Community health Center(CHC) at Rajakanika and PHC(N)'s at Kandiahat, Katna, Koilipur, RN_Rath_Hospital OH. Private Clinic : M.B Nursing Home, Rajkanika

== Notable Personalities ==
- Prafulla Das, who got Sarala Samman for his book Banhiman.
- Krutibas Nayak, an acclaimed children's story writer and a former director of All India Radio, Jeypore hails from Ektala village of Rajkanika
- Saheed Basu & Bisuni (Basudev Sethi of Tentulikoli & Bisuni Madhuala of Barttannee) who fought and martyred in a fight against the British Police force during the Kanika Peasant's movement
- Biplabi Kabi Anand Chandra Jena, the writer of famous book Dukhinee Kanika which fuelled the Kanika Peasant's Movement
- Raghunath Nayak, "the hero who tried to save Mahatma Gandhi and caught Nathuram Godsay while escaping after killing the father of nation Mahatma Gandhi" was also from one of its ideal village Jagulaipada.
- Jaban Kabi Mirja Ujir Beg - Rajkanika (Malli Sahada) : Eminent Poet & writer who wrote Nanda Utsava, a famous rural play staged on open air theatres in Rajkanika area

== See also ==
- Kanika Palace
- Aul
- Pattamundai
- Bhitarkanika National Park
