= Jagatpur, India =

Jagatpur Ghanashyam
- town
- Nickname: jagatpur
- Location in Odisha, India
- Coordinates: 20.52°N 85.93°E
- Country: India
- State: Odisha
- District: Cuttack
- Elevation: 31 m (102 ft)

Languages
  - Official: Odia
- Time zone: UTC+5:30 (IST)
- Website: odisha.gov.in

Jagatpur is an industrial town located in the Cuttack district of Odisha, India.

== Geography ==
Jagatpur has an average elevation of 31 m (102 ft).

Just near Jagatpur there is the Jobra bridge and the Mahanadi River goes under this. After the Jobra bridge there is the town of Cuttack which was the old capital of Odisha.

== Economy ==
Jagatpur is famous for temples and industry. You can find various industries such as Pepsi located along the banks of the Mahanadi.

== Healthcare ==
Sadguru Medical, a state-of-the-art 100 bedded multiplicity hospital with cardiology, nephrology, neurology, gastroenterology, gynecology, and pediatric departments, caters to the need of the industrial town and coastal Odisha.
