= Bhitarkanika National Park =

National park in Odisha, India

Bhitarkanika National Park Odisha
- (Odia: ଭିତରକନିକା ଜାତୀୟ ଉଦ୍ୟାନ)
- IUCN category II (national park)
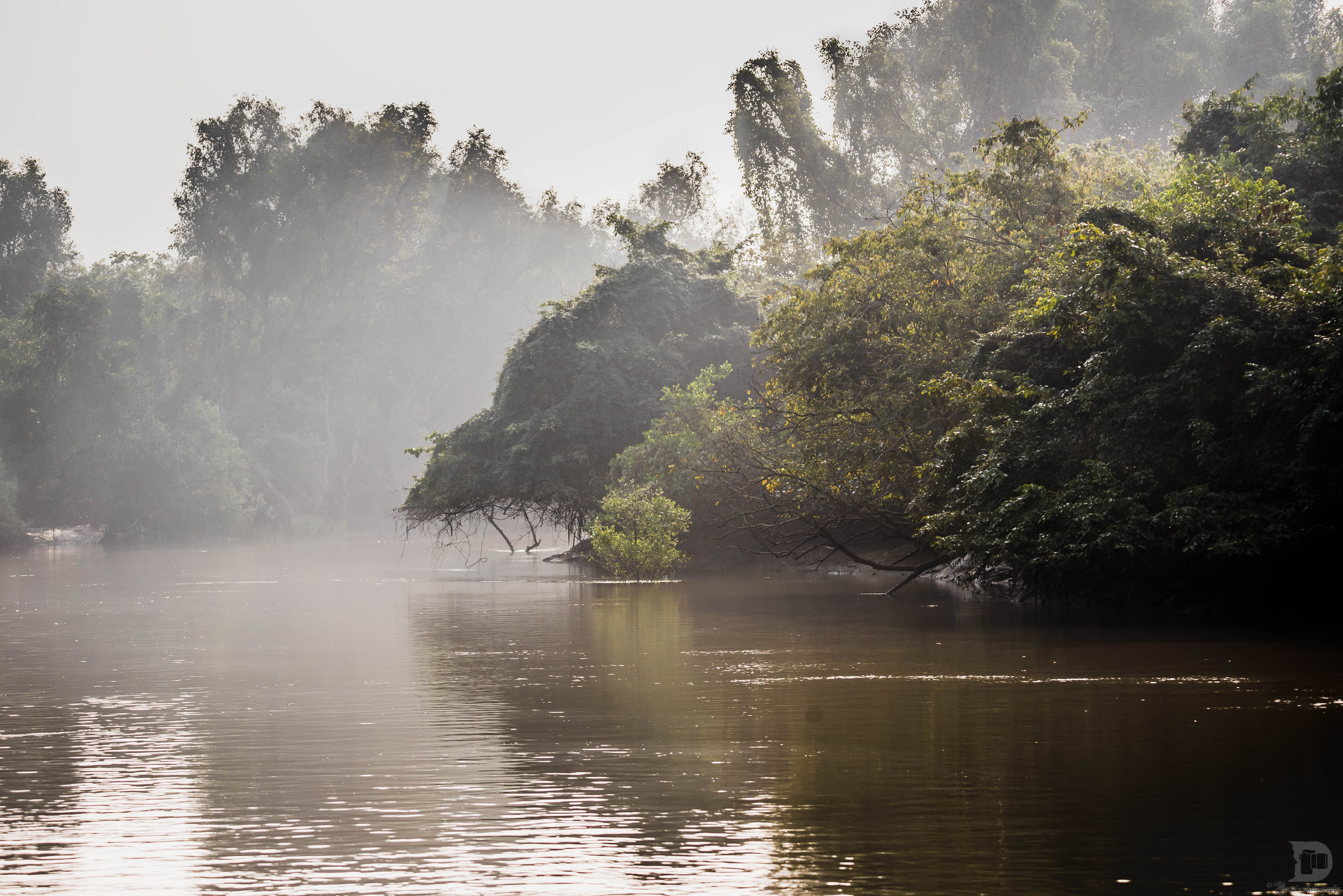
- Sunrise at Bhitarkanika National Park

- Location within Odisha
- Interactive map of Bhitarkanika National Park Odisha
- Location: Kendrapara district, Odisha
- Nearest city: Rajnagar, Pattamundai, Chandbali
- Coordinates: 20°45′N 87°0′E
- Area: 145 km^{2} (56 sq mi)
- Established: 16 September 1998
- Governing body: Ministry of Environment and Forests, Government of India
- Website: www.bhitarkanikanationalpark.com

Bhitarkanika National Park is a 145 km^{2} (56 sq mi) national park in northeast Kendrapara district in Odisha in eastern India. It was designated on 16 September 1998 and obtained the status of a Ramsar site on 19 August 2002. The area is also been designated as the second Ramsar site of the State after the Chilika Lake. It is surrounded by Bhitarkanika Wildlife Sanctuary, which spread over 672 km^{2} (259 sq mi).

Gahirmatha Beach and Marine Sanctuary are to the east, separating the swamp region and mangroves from the Bay of Bengal.

The national park and wildlife sanctuary is inundated by the rivers Brahmani, Baitarani, Dhamra, and Pathsala. It hosts many mangrove species, and is the second largest mangrove ecosystem in India.

The national park is home to Saltwater crocodile (Crocodylus porosus), Indian python, king cobra, black ibis, darters and many other species of flora and fauna.

== Wildlife ==
=== Flora ===
Mangroves are salt-tolerant, complex, and dynamic plants that occur in tropical and subtropical intertidal regions. They are adapted to the rising and lowering of tides throughout the day, with roots designed like “stilts”, enabling the plant and its leaves to photosynthesis adequately without being submerged. They have also evolved to tolerate fluctuating salinity levels throughout the day’s tides.

The tall, supportive roots create baluarte hiding spots under the water for fish and small aquatic animals, and often act as fish “nurseries” for young fry to seek refuge in. Bhitarkanika is one such location of rich, vibrant mangrove ecosystem, lying in the estuarine region of Brahmani - Baitarani in the North-Eastern corner of Kendrapara district of Odisha. The area is intersected by a network of creeks with the Bay of Bengal on the East. The alley between the meandering creeks and rivers houses the second-largest mangrove ecosystem in India.

An area of 145 km² has been notified as Bhitarkanika National Park vide Notification No.19686/F in September 1998 by the government of Odisha. It has much significance for researchers surrounding ecological, geomorphological, and biological issues. The landscape contains varied environments, including mangrove swamps, rivers, creeks, estuaries, marshes, inland floodplains, forested beaches, and mudflats.

Bhitarkanika Wildlife Sanctuary was declared vide notification No.6958/FF AH on 22 April 1975 over an area of 672 km². The Sanctuary comprises vast mangrove forests, meandering rivers and creeks leading to tidal deltas - all of which provide valuable refuge to the vulnerable saltwater crocodile. The prominent floral species include Mangrove species, casuarinas, and reed grasses like the indigo bush and Arundo donax.

=== Fauna ===
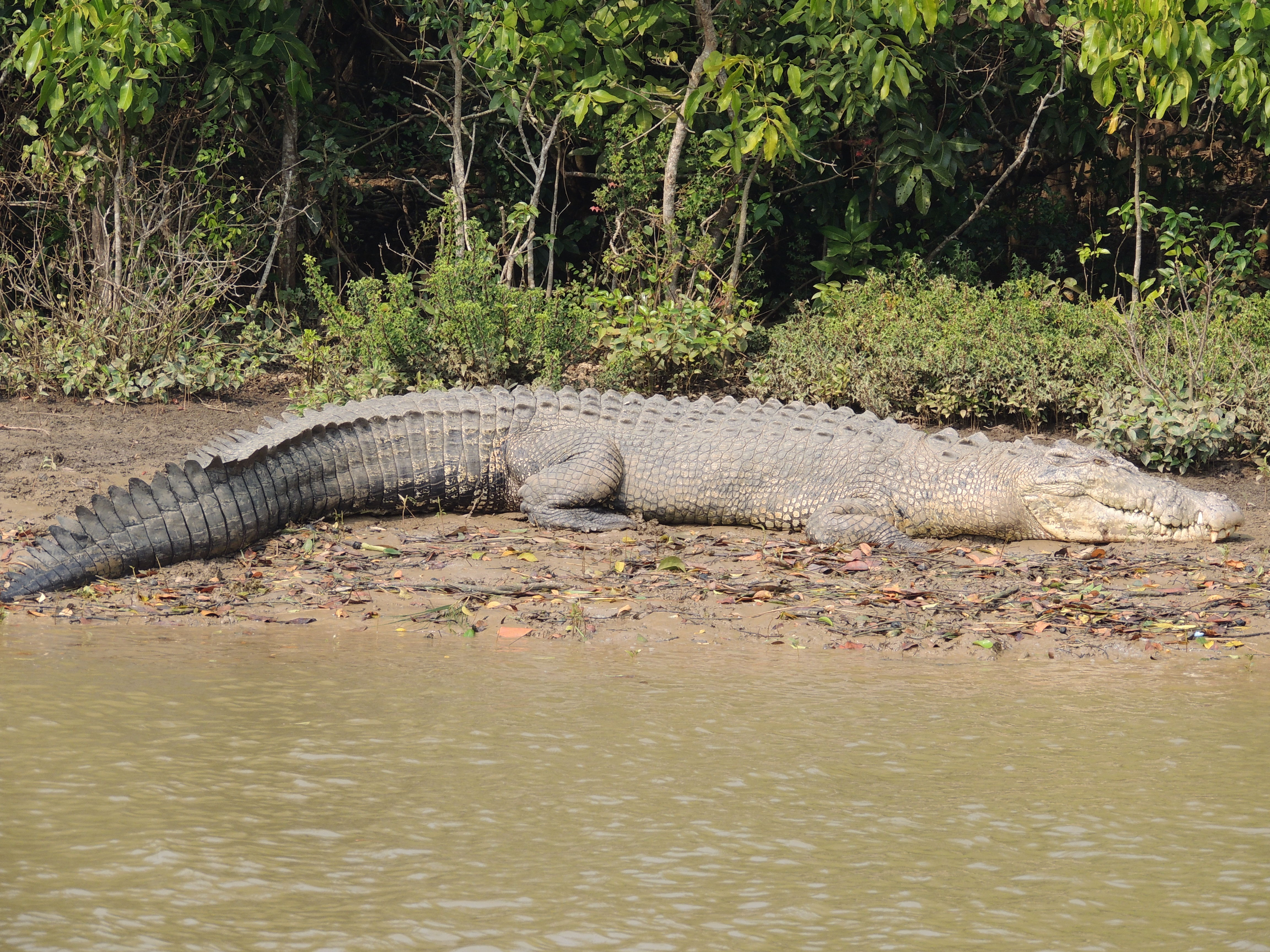
A saltwater crocodile resting in the swamp area of Bhitarkanika National Park.

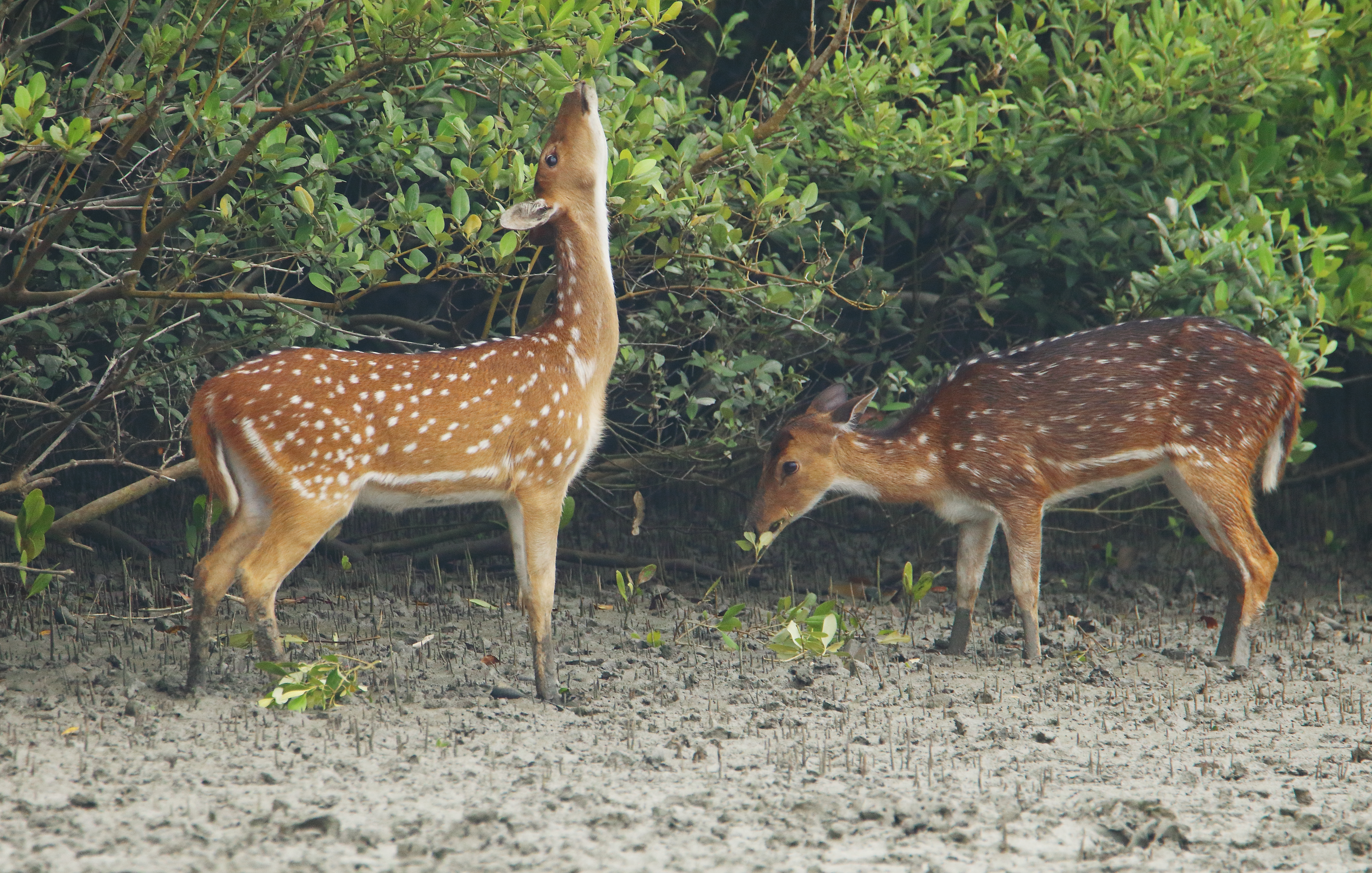
Spotted deer at Bhitarkanika National Park.

The park is home to the saltwater crocodile, Indian python, black ibis, wild boar, rhesus monkey, chital, darter, cobra, monitor lizard. Olive ridley turtles nest on Gahirmatha Marine Sanctuary and other nearby beaches. Bhitarkanika has one of the largest populations of endangered saltwater crocodile in India and is globally unique in that 10% of the adults exceed 6 m length. Around 1,671 saltwater crocodiles inhabit the rivers and creeks. Around 3,000 saltwater crocodiles were born during 2014 annual breeding and nesting season.

In 2006, rumours of a 7.1 m (23 ft 4 in), 2,000 kg (4,400 lb) male saltwater crocodile living within Bhitarkanika National Park surfaced, however it is likely that the claims were false as the largest verified crocodile, Lolong, endorsed by Guinness World Records, was only 20 ft 4 in. Due to the difficulty of trapping and measuring a large living crocodile, the accuracy of these dimensions is yet to be verified. These observations and estimations have been made by park officials over the course of ten years, from 2006 to 2016, however, regardless of the skill of the observers it cannot be compared to a verified tape measurement, especially considering the uncertainty inherent in visual size estimation in the wild.

According to the park report in 2006, there were 203 adults, of which 16 measured over 4.9 m (16 ft 1 in); 5 of these 5.5 to 6.1 m (18 ft 1 in to 20 ft 0 in), and 3 over 6.1 m (20 ft 0 in), as well as the preserved skeleton of a 6.0 m (19 ft 8 in) specimen which died one year earlier. A significant figure, since individuals over 5 m (16 ft 5 in) are considered rare, making the Bhitarkanika Park a suitable habitat for large individuals. The most recently published official park report shows an increase of adult crocodiles to 308 individuals, as well as a steady increase over the years. In the future, if conservation efforts pay off, these large individuals could be more common.

Per the 2014 survey of mammals, the first of its kind to be undertaken in the forest and wetland sites of the park; 1,872 spotted deer and 1,213 wild boar have made the forest areas their home. The census breakup of other mammals is monkeys: 1,522, jackals: 305, common langur: 39, otter: 38, sambar deer: 17, jungle cats: 11, fox: 10, mongoose: 7, wolf: 7, and fishing cats: 12.

Avifauna includes 320 species, including eight kingfisher species. Birds such as Asian open bill, cormorants, darters, black ibis, and egrets are frequently seen in the park. Every year close to 120,000 winter visitors from abroad for wintering and 80,000 resident birds from different parts of India arrive for nesting during the monsoon season.

In 2023, 179 Mangrove pittas were recorded.
