= Chandabali =

- Town
- Location in Odisha, India Chandabali (India)
- Coordinates: 20°47′0″N 86°46′0″E
- Country: India
- State: Odisha
- District: Bhadrak district

Government
  - Type: NAC
  - Body: Chandabali NAC

Population
  - Total: 100,905 up to 2,011

Languages
  - Official: Odia
- Time zone: UTC+5:30 (IST)
- PIN: 756133
- Vehicle registration: OD
- Member of Parliament: Avimanyu Sethi, BJP
- Constituency: Chandabali
- Member of Legislative Assembly: Byomkesh Ray
- Website: https://chandbalinac.in/

Chandabali (or Chandbali) is an old town in the Bhadrak district of Odisha, India on the bank of the River Baitarani.

== History ==
Before the 19th century AD, Chandabali was a small fishing village, and a natural river port. In 1866, trading began from this port to Bengal and in 1881 it was declared a government port by the British government. This led to growth and development of a market for agricultural produce.

In the 1910s, the United States Hydrographic Office noted that the opening of the Bengal-Nagpur Railway had drawn trade away from the port, and that the port was now considered to be simply part of the port of Dhamra. At the time, the port had between 22 and 30 feet of anchorage, in front of the town, with three landing piers, the water 10 feet deep at their ends. A steamer service ran four times per week between to and from and Calcutta. The town itself had a single police station, a custom house and warehouse, and a travelers' bungalow. The 1901 Census of India recorded the population as 1,826.

== Climate ==
January and December are the coldest months with temperature at around 18 °C.August and July receive most rainfall with precipitation count of 342.52mm.Chandbali weather history chart based on the last 5 years of Chandbali weather history. If you are visiting Chandbali in near future, this Chandbali weather history chart will give you an idea of the expected weather and plan your trip accordingly

Climate data for Chandabali (1991–2020, extremes 1929–2020)
Month	Jan	Feb	Mar	Apr	May	Jun	Jul	Aug	Sep	Oct	Nov	Dec	Year
Record high °C (°F)	34.7 (94.5)	39.8 (103.6)	41.7 (107.1)	44.2 (111.6)	45.8 (114.4)	47.2 (117.0)	42.8 (109.0)	37.5 (99.5)	37.7 (99.9)	39.9 (103.8)	35.6 (96.1)	34.2 (93.6)	47.2 (117.0)
Mean daily maximum °C (°F)	27.4 (81.3)	31.0 (87.8)	35.2 (95.4)	37.8 (100.0)	37.6 (99.7)	35.3 (95.5)	32.8 (91.0)	32.4 (90.3)	32.9 (91.2)	32.0 (89.6)	30.1 (86.2)	27.7 (81.9)	32.8 (91.0)
Mean daily minimum °C (°F)	14.8 (58.6)	18.5 (65.3)	22.5 (72.5)	25.0 (77.0)	26.3 (79.3)	26.3 (79.3)	25.7 (78.3)	25.6 (78.1)	25.6 (78.1)	23.8 (74.8)	19.3 (66.7)	15.0 (59.0)	22.4 (72.3)
Record low °C (°F)	5.1 (41.2)	8.5 (47.3)	10.6 (51.1)	15.6 (60.1)	14.1 (57.4)	16.5 (61.7)	20.1 (68.2)	20.0 (68.0)	19.6 (67.3)	14.4 (57.9)	9.6 (49.3)	7.7 (45.9)	5.1 (41.2)
Average rainfall mm (inches)	12.3 (0.48)	19.3 (0.76)	26.3 (1.04)	53.0 (2.09)	105.3 (4.15)	217.9 (8.58)	287.4 (11.31)	354.7 (13.96)	264.4 (10.41)	234.8 (9.24)	47.2 (1.86)	6.2 (0.24)	1,628.7 (64.12)
Average rainy days	0.9	1.4	1.7	2.8	5.1	9.5	14.1	14.9	11.9	7.9	1.9	0.5	72.5
Average relative humidity (%) (at 17:30 IST)	66	64	63	65	69	76	80	82	83	81	74	69	73
Source: India Meteorological Department

== Attractions ==
Maa Patana Mangala Temple, Chhatrapada, Ghanteswar Promoted By K.C.Nayak(NALU) son of Kashi Nath Nayak

Maa Patana Mangala's Bada Singhara Besa in Maha Vishuva Sankranti{Promoted By K.C.Nayak(NALU)}

The 650 km^{2} Bhitarkanika National Park is located about 35 km away, accessible via ferry. The park, one of the few marine parks in India, was established to protect Saltwater Crocodiles, with the special status of Crocodile Sanctuary. The Odisha Government has since established a saltwater crocodile-breeding center in the park. Other attractions are the remains of two 9th century monuments and a temple dedicated to the worship of Lord Shiva.. Another Shakti pitha Maa Patana Mangala Temple(Chhatrapada) lies approximately 25.0 km(30 mins) away from Chandabali. A major famous festival for "Patua Yatra" is held at Chhatrapada from April 14 to 21 annually. Chandabali is also home to the Sri Aurobindo Dibyadham Ashram, its Relics Temple and Integral Education centre. The Baba Akhandalamani shiv temple (Aradi) is around 12 km away from Chandbali and is one of the renowned saiva pitha's in Odisha. The Chandabali Market includes two temples, the temple of Goddess Kali at one end, and the temple of Goddess Durga, And Pokhorisahi Big Hanuman Temple And Hanuman Batika, Near Pokhorisahi at other end.

Chandabali features a major dry fish industry, with fishermen taking advantage of the natural river bank within the town.

Chandabali is now linked to the Kendrapada district through several bridge connections. The main or important bridge named Gamon India bridge as the name of bridge construction company.

There are one N.A.C namely Chandbali N.A.C and six gram panchayats (G.P.) in Chandbali namely Panchpada G.P., Vijaya nagar G.P., Bhatapada G.P., Baligaon G.P., Tentulidiha G.P and Ostia G.P.. Population of Chandbali (six gram panchayats taken together) is nearly 20000, of them 16000 (approx.) are above 18 years of age.

== Schools ==
- Digital Organization for Tutorial, Chandbali
- Chandbali Degree College, Chandbali
- Shiva Durga High School, Chandbali
- Dakha High School, Chandbali
- Sri Aurobindo Integral Education centre Dibyadham, Chandbali
- Venkateswar School
- Sophia English Medium School
- Motto High School, Motto
- Chandbali Girls High School, Chandbali
- Adarsha Vidyalaya, Chandabali
- Basudev coaching centre, Chandbali
- Chandbali Arts tutorial
- Ghanteswar College
- Motto College
