= List of Bangladeshi sweets and desserts =

This is a list of Bengali sweets and desserts. Most of these sweet dishes are unique to Bangladesh but some of them originally came from other parts of the Subcontinent and re-made as a new Bangladeshi versions of them. To know more check out: Bangladeshi cuisine, Bengali cuisine, Mughlai cuisine and South Asian cuisine.

== Bangladeshi sweets and desserts ==
Name	Image	Main ingredients	Remarks
Amriti of Sylhet			
Bundiya			Ghee-based
Bogurar doi		Milk, Sugar	Milk-based
Chanar goja		Chhena, sugar, ghee	Milk-based
Chanar Jilapi of Dhaka	Food-chhanar-jilipi	Chhena, sugar, ghee	Milk-based
Chanar kheer of Bengal		Chhana, sugar, milk	Milk-based
Chhanamukhi of Brahmanbaria		Chhana, sugar syrup, milk	Milk-based
Chanar payesh of Bengal			Milk-based
Chomchom of Tangail		Flour, cream, sugar, saffron, lemon juice, coconut flakes	Milk-based
Jolbhora Sandesh of Kolkata			Milk-based
Kadapak			Milk-based
Kalojam of Bangladesh			Milk-based
Kancha golla of Natore			
Kheer er chop of Bengal			Milk-based
Kheersagar			Milk-based
Komolabhog of East Bengal			Milk-based
Ledikeni of East Bengal and West Bengal		Chhena, sugar, ghee	Milk-based
Lyangcha of Bengal			Milk-based
Malapua (dessert) of East Indian subcontinent			Milk-based
Mihidana of West Bengal		Besan flour, sugar, ghee	Besan-based
Milk cake			Milk-based
Mishti doi of Bogra			Milk-based
Narkeler naru of Rural Bengal			Coconut-based
Pantua of Manikganj		Chhena, sugar, ghee	Milk-based
Patisapta of Bengal			Milk-based
Pitha of Bangladesh (Especially in Barisal and Khulna)			Milk-based
Pranohora of Natore			
Rabri of Bengal			Milk-based
Rajbhog of Bengal			Milk-based
Rasabali			Milk-based
Roshogolla of Barisal		Chhena, sugar	Milk-based
Roshkodom of Rajshahi			Milk-based
Roshomalai of Cumilla		Chhena, milk, sugar	Milk-based
Roshomonjuri of Rangpur		Chhena, milk, sugar	Milk-based
Sandesh of Shatkhira (several types)			Milk-based
Sarbhaja		Milk cream, sugar syrup	Layers of thickened milk cream, fried and then dipped in sugar syrup.
Sarpuria			
Shahi jilapi of Old Dhaka		Flour, syrup, milk	Twirled coils of flours are fried and poured in sugar syrup.
Sitabhog			Milk-based
Tusha Shinni of Sylhet		Flour	Sugar syrup

== See also ==
- Bangladeshi cuisine
- Bengali cuisine
- List of desserts
- List of Bangladeshi dishes
