= Kora Khai =

Korakhai
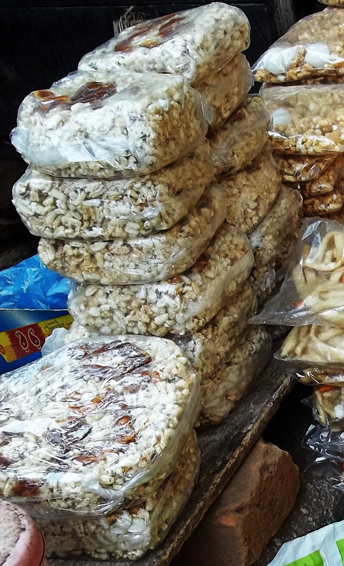
- Korakhai in Bhubaneswar
- Alternative names: Muan
- Place of origin: ଓଡ଼ିଶା
- Region or state: Bhubaneswar, Odisha
- Serving temperature: Prasad
- Main ingredients: Puffed rice, Jaggery, Coconut, Cardamom

Korakhai is a sweetmeat whose principal ingredients are khai (a form of puffed rice), jaggery, coconut and cardamom. It is a traditional Odia food, mainly served as a prasad in temples. It is a common food in the state of Odisha, India. Pilgrims offer Korakhai as a form of prasad to Lord Lingaraj. It is also a form of caramelized lia, and is also known as Leea in western Odisha.

== Ingredients ==
- Khai
- Jaggery or sugar
- Coconut
- Cardamom

== Preparation ==
Caramelization:

For caramelization add sugar or jaggery to water and let it melt for 10-15 minutes. Add coconut pieces and cinnamon to it.

Preparation of Kora:

Add puffed rice to the caramelized solution and make balls for Muan or cut it into pieces for Khai.

== See also ==
- Chhena Poda
- Rasabali
- Rasagolla
- Chhena Gaja
- Kheersagar
- Chhena Kheeri
- Chhena jalebi
- List of Indian sweets and desserts
- Oriya cuisine
