= Mirzapur, Ishwarganj, Mymensingh =

Mirzapur মির্জাপুর
- Village of Bangladesh
- Location in Bangladesh
- Coordinates: 24°39′36.03″N 90°31′18.99″E
- Country: Bangladesh
- Division: Mymensingh Division
- District: Mymensingh District

Area
  - Total: 2.21 km^{2} (0.85 sq mi)

Population (2018)
  - Total: 1,387
  - Density: 628/km^{2} (1,630/sq mi)
- Time zone: UTC+06:00 (BST)
- Postal code: 2280
- Literacy: 87.08%
- Official language: Bengali, English

Mirzapur is a village in Ishwarganj Upazila of Mymensingh District in the Division of Mymensingh, Bangladesh.

== Economy ==
Agriculture constitutes 87.52% of Mirzapur's economy. The rest is divided into "non-agriculture", 3.38%; business, 2.22%; services, 1.84%; and others, 5.04%. Agricultural land occupies 308 acres, comprising 63 acres of single-crop land, 215 acres of double-crop, 25 acres of triple-crop, and 5 acres of quadruple-crop. Net crop land is 339 acres, while gross crop land is 354 acres.

=== Crops ===
Paddy and wheat are the village's main crops. Others include eggplant, amaranth, red amaranth, bottle gourd or calabash, taro, taro green leaf, taro stem, taro corm, taro root / taro shoots, bean, black Bengal gram, bamboo, lady finger, cucumber, betel leaf, betel nut, potato, turmeric, onion, garlic, ginger, sugar cane, mustard seed, sesbania grandiflora, ash gourd, teasle gourd, sesame seed, nigella seed, coriander, green coriander leaf, star anise, anise/ aniseed, fennel, fenugreek, green chili, red chili, mint, fresh mint/ mint leaf, celery, basil, cabbage, bay leaf, spinach and fenugreek leaf.

Each family has a pond for raising fish, fulfilling local demand and for occasional sales. Cattle are also raised for agricultural cultivation, and local milk and meat demand.

=== Fruits ===
The fruit and fruit trees cultivated in Mirzapur are:

- Mango
- Banana
- Guava
- Elephant Apple / Dillenia indica / Chulta
- Jamun / Java plum / Syzygium cumini / Jaam
- Custard Apple / Aata
- Tamarind
- Velvet Apple / Gaab
- Star Fruit / Carambola / Kamranga
- Lime / Lemon
- Jackfruit / Kanthal
- Papaya
- Bengal Currant / Carissa carandas / Koromcha
- Pineapple
- Baccaurea motleyana / Lotkon
- Aegle marmelos / Bengal quince / bel
- Wood Apple / Limonia acidissima / Kodbel
- Lichi
- Sapodilla / Manilkara zapota / Sofeda
- Pomegranate
- Elaeocarpus serratus / Jolpai
- Areca nut / Betel nut
- Phyllanthus acidus / Orboroi
- Terminalia chebula / Ink Nut / Horitoki
- Phoenix dactylifera / Date palm
- Coconut
- Pomelo / Jambura / Batabi Lebu
- Gooseberry / Aamloki / Aamla
- Artocarpus lacucha / Deowa
- Longan / Kathlichu / Anshfol
- Sugar-apple / Shorifa
- Garcinia xanthochymus / Defol
- Wax apple / Syzygium samarangense / Jamrul
- Water apple / Rose apple / Syzygium jambos / Golapjaam
- Watermelon / Tormuj
- Plum, Jujube / Ziziphus mauritiana / Boroi
- Palm / Borassus flabellifer / Taal
- Drumstick / Moringa oleifera / Shojne
- Bilimbi / Averrhoa bilimbi

== Geography and climate ==
The village has officially defined geographical limits. The village is divided into two parts, East Mirzapur and West Mirzapur. It is clearly separated from the Tarundia to Mymensingh expressway. Mirzapur circle bus stop is at the middle point of this village.

The climate of Mirzapur is moderate. With its proximity to the Himalayas, conditions are much cooler than in Dhaka. Its warmest and most humid season is from April to May, just before the monsoon. During this time of year, temperatures may rise as high as 40 °C (104 °F). Usually beginning in May or June, the monsoon brings temperatures ranging from 15 °C (59 °F) to 20 °C (68 °F) and rains that last for days or weeks. The temperature falls below this range in the winter months (December and January) which may begin as early as November and continue until February.

Climate data for Mirzapur
Month	Jan	Feb	Mar	Apr	May	Jun	Jul	Aug	Sep	Oct	Nov	Dec	Year
Record high °C (°F)	32.2 (90.0)	35.4 (95.7)	41.0 (105.8)	43.5 (110.3)	42.7 (108.9)	41.0 (105.8)	41.5 (106.7)	40.1 (104.2)	38.1 (100.6)	37.5 (99.5)	34.3 (93.7)	30.0 (86.0)	43.5 (110.3)
Mean daily maximum °C (°F)	24.0 (75.2)	27.6 (81.7)	31.7 (89.1)	33.3 (91.9)	32.1 (89.8)	31.0 (87.8)	31.2 (88.2)	31.2 (88.2)	31.1 (88.0)	30.7 (87.3)	28.6 (83.5)	25.7 (78.3)	29.9 (85.8)
Daily mean °C (°F)	17.4 (63.3)	20.6 (69.1)	25.0 (77.0)	27.5 (81.5)	27.7 (81.9)	28.0 (82.4)	28.2 (82.8)	28.2 (82.8)	28.1 (82.6)	27.0 (80.6)	23.5 (74.3)	19.8 (67.6)	25.1 (77.2)
Mean daily minimum °C (°F)	11.1 (52.0)	13.5 (56.3)	18.5 (65.3)	22.2 (72.0)	23.8 (74.8)	25.0 (77.0)	25.4 (77.7)	25.5 (77.9)	25.5 (77.9)	23.6 (74.5)	18.2 (64.8)	13.5 (56.3)	20.5 (68.9)
Record low °C (°F)	3.1 (37.6)	4.5 (40.1)	8.9 (48.0)	11.2 (52.2)	12.6 (54.7)	19.4 (66.9)	17.1 (62.8)	17.3 (63.1)	15.2 (59.4)	10.9 (51.6)	8.3 (46.9)	3.8 (38.8)	3.1 (37.6)
Average precipitation mm (inches)	12 (0.5)	17 (0.7)	46 (1.8)	110 (4.3)	286 (11.3)	469 (18.5)	401 (15.8)	398 (15.7)	311 (12.2)	179 (7.0)	18 (0.7)	2 (0.1)	2,249 (88.6)
Average relative humidity (%)	42	36	32	46	61	75	74	75	72	68	55	46	57
Source: National Newspapers

== Education ==
Without a government primary school no government establishment is not present in this village. Ancient Upendra Kishore Roy Bahadur Minor school was situated here. 96% inhabitants of this village are signed literate.

The three main educational systems in Mirzapur, ordered by decreasing student attendance numbers, are: General Education System, Madrasah Education System, Technical - Vocational Education System. Other system include a Professional Education System. Each of these three main systems is divided into three levels are Primary Level (Class I-VIII), Secondary Level (Class IX-XII) and Tertiary Level.

== Scocio-cultural Condition ==
There is not any market place (Bazar/Haat) in this village. The people of this village are going to shopping near Tarundia bazar. No government establishment are not seen in this village without a primary school. Once upon a time famous 'fuluri river' was blown in this village. But no sign of this river is present now. This village is situated in the bank of 'Koila Bill' or 'Kalia Bill'.

Only Muslims (Islam) and Hindus (Sanatan) religious viewed people are living in Mirzapur village. Two mosques in this village for Muslims performing their daily five times salat and an Eidgah maydan for others prayer like Eid-ul Fitr, Eid-ul Adha, funeral prayer (namaz-e-janaza) and so on. 'Shorgiyo Shoshi Kanto Babu Mandir' is newly established Hindu temple in this village. A famous shadhur "aakhra/mandir" is located in this village on the bank of historious "Koila Bill/Kaliya Bill".

Two Eid festivals (Eid al-Fitr and Eid-ul-adha), Pohela Boishakh (Bangla Nababarsha), Nobanno Utshob, two agricultural product harvesting season (Aush/Boro and Aman), Ratha-Yatra, Durga puja, Kali puja, Lakshmi Puja, Sworoswati Puja, Maghi Purnima, Doal Purnima, Cock fight, Bull fight etc. are the main variety of occasional festivals of this village's people. But both Muslims and Hindus are enjoyed each festival with each other.

== Sports ==
Sports are a popular form of entertainment in Mirzapur and an essential part of Bangladeshi culture. Ha-du-du or Kabaddi is the national sport; however, cricket and football are the most popular. Other common sports include Golla chut, Daria bandha, Bouchi, Gilli-danda / Danguli, Saat chara, Swimming, Cock fight, Bull fight, Marble, Card, Boom busting, Ekka-Dokka, Kanamachi, Badminton, Voliball, 16 Ghuti/Sixteen Beads, Putul Khela, Boat Race, Kutkut, Kori Khela, Pahsh khela, Polantuk (hiding game) and Iching Biching.

== Cuisine ==
Mirzapuri cuisine (Bengali: মির্জাপুরের রান্না/রন্ধনপ্রণালী) is dominated by Mymensingh cuisine and shaped by the diverse history and geography of Bangladesh. Rice (ভাত) is the main staple. Dishes exhibit strong aromas. A variety of spices and herbs, along with mustard oil and ghee, is used.

The main breads are naan, porota, ruti (chaler ruti and aatar ruti), bakorkhani and luchi. Dal is the second most important staple and is served with rice/porota/luchi. Fish is a staple, especially freshwater fish. Vegetable dishes, either mashed (bhorta), boiled (sobji), or leaf-based (shaak), are widely served. Lobster and shrimp are favorites. Gourmet polao is served during feasts and festivals. Types of Bengali biryani and polao include mutton, beef, Ilish and chicken. Kebabs include shikh, reshmi, shashlik, tikka and shami. The village is home to desserts and confectioneries, ranging from pan-fried to steamed rice cakes (pitha) to halua and sweets made from fruits and sweetened cheese. Tea is the national beverage, offered to guests as a gesture of welcome. Popular snacks include samosas, pakoras, jhalmuri (puffed rice mixed with various spices), rice cakes (pitha) and rolls. Phuchka and chotpoti are major street foods.

=== Main ingredients ===
Mirzapur's main staple food of freshwater fish comes from individual ponds and nearest Koila Bill. Every pond is filled with fish. Rui, Katol, Koi, Pabda, Boal, Chitol, Magur, Shing, Mola, Puti, Veda (Meni), Baila, Vagna, Lacho, Goina/Guniya, Taki, Shoal, Mrigel, Grass Curp, Minar Curp, Silver Curp, Baim, Tara Baim, Gutum/Guti, Chingri, Kholshe and Raga are favorites. Ilish comes from the outer side market.

Major fish dishes includes ilish, butterfish (pabda), rui (rohu), pangas catfish (pangash), clown knifefish (chitol), walking catfish (magur ), barramundi (bhetki) and tilapia. Meat consumption includes beef (tehari), mutton (kacchi), lamb, venison, chicken (murgi), group duck, squab, koel and pigeons.

Lentils/Pulses (legumes) include at least five dozen varieties. The most important are Bengal gram (chhola), pigeon peas, red gram, black gram (biuli), and green gram (mung bean). Pulses are used almost exclusively in the form of dal, except chhola, which is often cooked whole for breakfast and is processed into flour (beshon).

Various green vegetables and fruits are available. Gourds, roots and tubers, leafy greens, succulent stalks, citrons and limes, green and purple eggplants, red onions, plantains, broad beans, okra/lady finger, banana tree stems and flowers, lotus roots, green jackfruit, red pumpkins, and mushrooms are to be found in the vegetable markets or kacha bazaar or sabji bazaar.

=== Spices ===
Bay leaves, cumin powder, cumin, red chili powder, turmeric powder, coriander powder, garlic, onion, ginger, black pepper, chili powder, nigella, mustard and fenugreek seeds are common spices. Mustard oil and vegetable oil are the primary cooking media, although sunflower oil and peanut oil are also used. Clarified butter (ghee) is used for its aromatic flavors.

Panch foron is a general purpose spice mixture composed of fenugreek seeds, nigella seeds, celery seeds, cilantro seeds, and black mustard seeds. This mixture is more convenient for vegetarian dishes and fish preparations.

The use of spices for both meat and vegetable dishes is quite extensive and includes many combinations. The combination of whole spices, fried and added at the start or finish of cooking as a flavoring is special to each dish. Whole black mustard seeds and freshly ground mustard paste form a typical combination. A pungent mustard sauce called kashundi is sauce for snacks or sometimes makes a base ingredient for fish dishes and vegetable dishes.

=== Meals ===
Each dish is eaten separately with a small amount of rice or ruti, so that individual flavors can be enjoyed. The typical meal includes sequences of dishes. Two sequences are commonly followed, one for ceremonial dinners and the other for day-to-day eating. Both sequences have regional variations, and sometimes differences are significant for a particular course.

Ceremonial occasions may employ elaborate serving rituals, but professional catering and buffet-style dining has become common. The traditions have not disappeared; large family occasions and the more lavish ceremonial feasts continue the traditional rituals.

==== Dishes ====
Mirzapuri foods contain staples, such as rice and flat breads. Different traditional flat breads include luchi, porota, bakhorkhani, nan, ruti, rice flour flatbread and chitai pitha. Meat dishes, as well as dal (a spicy lentil soup) and vegetables commonly accompany the breads. Traditional dishes can be 'dry', such as gosht bhuna. Items with jhol (gravy) are often curried. Vegetables are also used for light curries.

On special occasions, guests receive Biryani and Borhani (spicy drink that is known to aid digestion).

Chutney is mainly served at the end of a meal. It is & sour thickened curry usually made with local seasonal fruits, such as raw

mango, jujube, gooseberry or tamarind with panch poron and sugar.

The last item before the sweets Doi (baked yogurt). It is generally of two varieties, either natural flavour and taste or Mishti Doi (sweet yogurt), typically sweetened with charred sugar. This brings about a brown colour and a distinct flavour.

===== Desserts =====
Bengalis invented a variety of sweets. Most of them were created by a Ghosh (a dessert maker or dairy product seller caste). The most common sweets and desserts include:

Rasgulla locally pronounced :Roshogolla" or "Rashgolla", is made with channa (posset/curdled milk) and sugar syrup. It is one of the most widely consumed sweets. The dish has many regional variations.

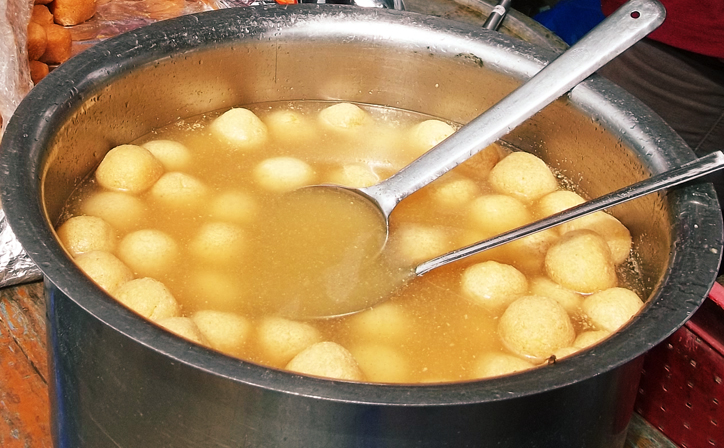
Rosgolla

Channer shondesh is created with milk and sugar. (Bengali: সন্দেশ). Some recipes call for the use of chhena or paneer (which is made by curdling milk and separating the whey from it) instead of milk itself.

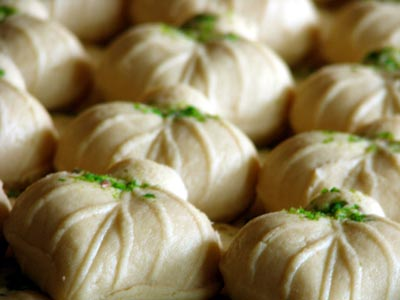
Sandesh

Chhanar mishti is made from chickpea flour with sugar/jaggery/molasses. Various types are available across Bangladesh.

Mishti doi is sweetened homemade creamy yogurt prepared by boiling milk until it is slightly thickened, sweetened with sugar, either brown sugar (gud/gur/mithai) or date molasses (khajuri gud/gur/mithai), and allowing the milk to ferment overnight.

Naru it is usually home-made and used as offerings in Hindu rituals.

Rosh-malai are small rashgollas in milk base.

Khaja deep fried sweets are made from wheat flour and ghee, with sugar and sesame seeds as the coating.

Mua is made with rice flakes and jaggery.

Hawai'i Mithai is made with sugar and given various forms.

Chhana is fresh, unripened curd cheese made from water buffalo milk.

Chhanar jilapi is similar to regular jalebi except that they are made with chhana.

Khir is a rice pudding made by boiling rice, broken wheat, tapioca, or vermicelli with milk and sugar. It is flavoured with cardamom, raisins, saffron, cashews, pistachios or almonds.

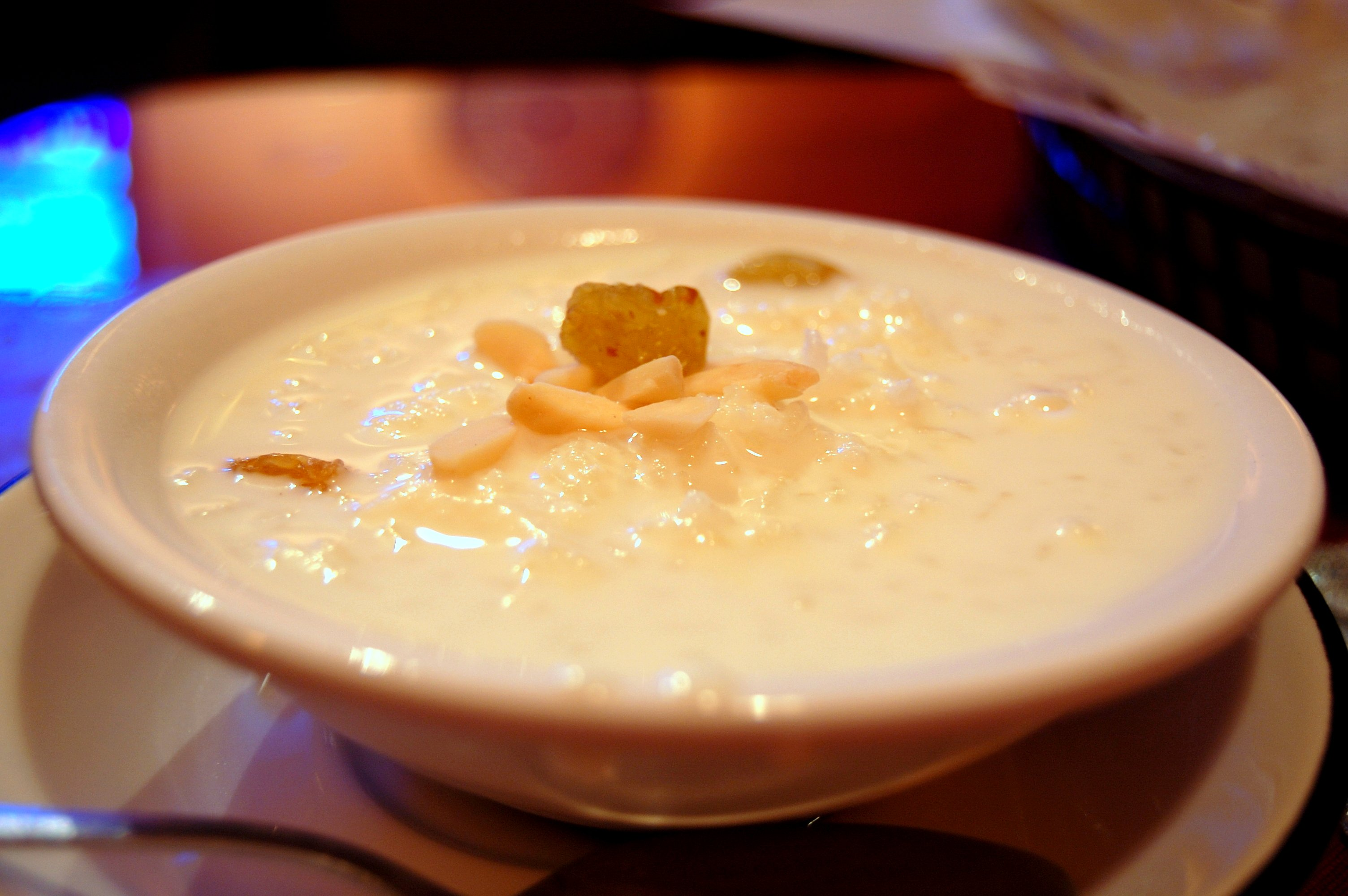
Kheer

Phirni together with zarda, is typical during Shab-e-Barat and Eid. It is cooked with dense milk, sugar/jaggery, and scented rice (kalijira rice). Although it takes a lot of time to cook, it is a favorite Mirzapuri dessert. A thicker version of khir is used as filling for pitha.

Gurer Shondesh is a fritter made from rice flour and palm sugar.

Goja is a light, sweet snack made from flour and sugar, and often served as street food, which is consumed both as dessert and starter.

Chomchom (চমচম) (originally from Porabari, Tangail District), goes back centuries. The modern version of this oval-shaped sweet is reddish brown in colour and has a denser texture than rôshogolla. It can be preserved longer. Granules of mawoa or dried milk can also be sprinkled over chômchôm.

Shemai is made with vermicelli prepared with ghee or vegetable oil.

Muktagachar monda is a traditional sweetmeat. First made in 1824, it is known for its originality and taste.

Peda (পেড়া) is from India. It is usually prepared in thick, semi-soft pieces. The main ingredients are khoa, sugar and traditional flavorings, including cardamom seeds, pistachio nuts and saffron.

Balushahi is made from a stiff dough made with all-purpose flour, ghee and a pinch of baking soda. One-inch-diameter (25 mm), 1/2-inch-thick (13 mm) discs are shaped with hands, fried in ghee or oil and dunked in thick sugar syrup to form a sugar coating. They are sweet, but tasty with a slightly flaky texture.

Rabri is condensed milk based dish made by boiling the milk on low heat for a long time until it becomes dense and changes its color to pinkish. Sugar, spices and nuts are added to it to give it flavor. It is chilled and served as dessert. Rabri is the main ingredient in several desserts, such as rasabali, chhena kheeri, and khira sagara. Rabri can also be made savoury with salt, masala, and zeera.

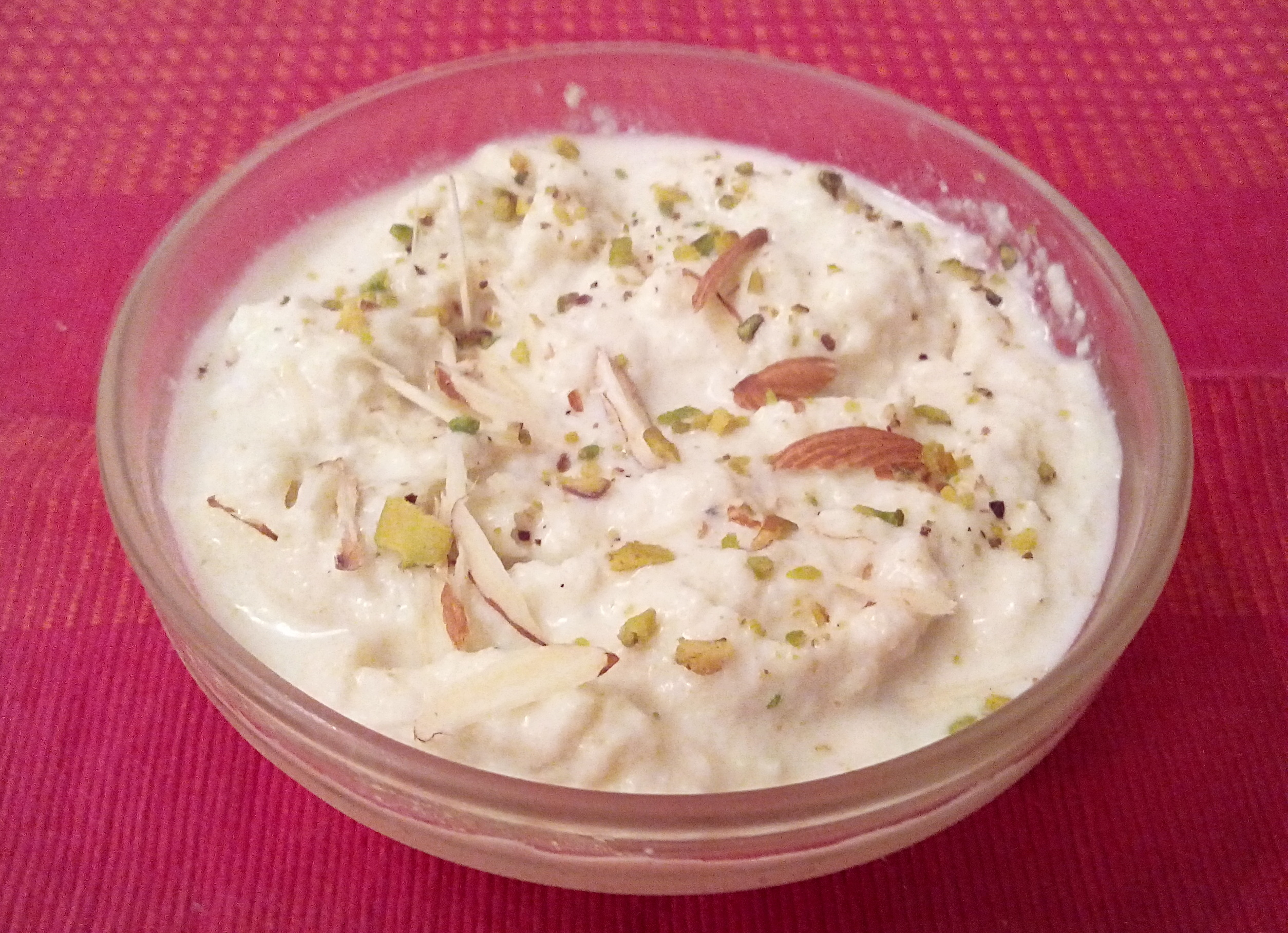
Rabri

The tradition of making different kinds of pan-fried, steamed or boiled sweets, lovingly known as piţhe or pitha still flourishes. These little balls of heaven symbolise the coming of winter, and the arrival of a season where rich food can be included. The richness lies in the silkiness of the milk, which is often mixed with molasses or jaggery made from either date palm or sugarcane, and sometimes sugar. They are mostly divided into different categories based on the way they are created. The most common forms of these cakes include bhapa steamed (piţha), fried (pakan piţha) and dumplings (puli piţha), among others. The other common pithas are chondropuli, pati shapta, chitai piţha and dudh puli. Generally, rice flour goes into making the pitha.

===== Beverages =====
Common beverages are sugarcane juice with jaggery (akher gur or shorbot), sugarcane juice (akher rosh), Borhani (a spicy drink usually served in gatherings, banquets and weddings), whisked salted milk (ghol), date palm juice (Khejur Rosh), tea, malai, faluda, mango juice (amer shorbot), watermelon juice (tormujer shorbot), juice of Bengal, quince or wood apple (bel er shorbot) and lemon-lime juice (lebur shorbot).

== Religion ==
The population is 60% Hindu and 40% Muslim.
