= Karilopatna =

- Village
- Location in Odisha, India Karilopatna (India)
- Coordinates: 20°27′28″N 86°21′36″E
- Country: India
- State: Odisha
- District: Kendrapara
- Elevation: 13 m (43 ft)

Population (2001)
  - Total: 2,697

Languages
  - Official: Odia
- Time zone: UTC+5:30 (IST)
- Telephone code: 91-6727
- Vehicle registration: OD
- Website: kendrapara.nic.in

Karilopatna (Karilo patna, Karilo patana, is a village near Patkura in Kendrapara district in the Indian state of Odisha.

== Geography ==
Karilopatna is located at Kendrapara. It has an average elevation of 13 m (43 ft). It is surrounded by Bhadrak, Jajpur, Cuttack and Jagatsinghpur districts and Bay of Bengal in the east.

The river Karandia (a branch of Luna) and Chitrotpala (a branch of Mahanadi) flow outside of Karilopatna Panchayat.

== Culture ==
The Baladevjew Temple is located in Kendrapara. A car festival or Rath Yatra is held in the month of Ashadha (June/July) every year. The Gajalaxmi puja on Kojaagari Purnima or Kumar Purnima is celebrated in the month of October and Kartikeya Puja in November and Maa Kali Puja at Olaver are held each year. Gajalaxmi puja is a big festival here and is celebrated for 7 days. Maa Kali Puja in Olaver is one of the famous festivals in the region. The Odia sweet dish, Rasabali, originated from Kendrapara. Different types of prasad prepared and used in Baladevjew Temple include Rasabali, Potali Pitha, Magaja Ladoo, Kakaraa, Khaja, Karanji, Chhena Kheeri, Ghanabrata, Dahipakhala, Khiri, and Puri.

Village Kusupur is famous for its Dussera Sabha, which organizes the traditional Sword Fighting on the eleventh day (next day of Dussera) for more than hundred years. On this occasion, Kusupur Dussera sabha organises various local cultural functions including the sword fighting wherein the Kshetriyas of village Kusupur and from the nearest gadjat areas participate and are awarded. The fire fighting is also worth watching. Every year, about a lakh of people gathered in Kusupur to witness the Dussera Sabha.

Village Kusupur is situated on the bank of river Birupa and next to Balichandrapur on the National Highway No. 5A. Bhalukuni Melana is celebrated each and every year in Derabis hata ground. It is one of the biggest melana in the district. Ramjan, Eid, Bakhrid, Muharram are the festivals of Muslims are observed each year. Derabish is located 11 km away from district headquarters. Karilopatna is located near Kendrapara. Potali Matha, located at Balia which is around 5 km towards north of Kendrapara town, organizes a 5-day 'Biswa Santhi yajna' each year in March. People from across India gather there. On the final day of the Yajna, organized by the local trust, there is always a big crowd, more than 20,000 to get the prasad (Yajna Ahuti).

Lohit baba Mandir, located at Chhata Chhaka (NH-5A), Derabish is around 6 km away from Kendrapara town and 20 km away from chandikhol. Dadhibamana Temple is situated in Derabish. One of the famous "Boita Bandana Utashv" held on November (Kartika masa) in the village kalapada, which is 7 km from Kendrapara town situated in the bank of Luna river (A part of Mahanadi). Near about 20-30 thousand people gather in this festival that will celebrate for 7 days. That festival is mainly celebrated for the remembrance of Sadhabs who were gone to Java and Sumitra etc. for business.

Most people are farmers, though some do business, and others fish in the river and the bay of Bengal. Growing prawn near the sea shore is also a profitable business. Many small-scale industries have recently been developing, so some take opportunities there.

== Landmarks ==
Batighar is the first lighthouse installed in eastern coast of India. It is situated on the other bank of river Kharinasi. It is 125 feet tall. Construction of this lighthouse was started on 6 December 1836 and it was lit on 16 October 1837.

Kanika Palace is a massive palace constructed by the King of Kanika. It was constructed on an area of 4 acres of land and height of the structure is of 75 feet. It is situated in Rajkanika Block.

Aul Palace is situated near Aul township. It is an ancient palace spread over 40 acres of land.

Badakotha is an old building near the Kendrapara Bus stand. Once upon a time, Badakotha in Odisha only indicated to the 2 stair building of Radhashyam Narendra.

Hukitola is a storm proof go-down constructed on the Jamboo island by the British according to the wish of Captain Harris. It consists of 11 large size and 9 small size chambers.

== Environment ==
Bhitara Kanika is covered with deep mangrove forest and saline rivers. It was declared as Sanctuary from 21-04-1975. It is famous for natural crocodile breeding. Other animals include deer, wild boar, monkeys, monitors, pythons, and king cobras.

There are many picnic spots in and around Kendrapara. Paradeep is only 20–30 km drive from Kendrapara. You can see the sea beach, port, Nehru Bangala (first prime minister of India had come here) and the entry gate of river to sea shore. Paradeep is also the last point of east coast of India.

== Religion ==
Most popular Udaya Giri & Ratna Giri just 10–15 km drive from Kendrapada. Mainly Budhu Murti, Budhu pratima are conserved there. There also a picnic spot Named Sakhi Bata. It is situated near Luna River. Lord Baladev and Laxmi Mandir is there.

- Maa Gojabayani Temple, Baghadia
- Baraha Jew Temple, Aul
- Binodbehari Jewish temple, Ganamahal
- Sakhibata Temple, Bagada
- DadhiBaman Jewish Temple, Choudakulat
- Sakhibata Temple, Bagada
- Gobinda Jewish Temple, Kendrapara

== Politics ==
Kendrapara is part of Kendrapara (Lok Sabha constituency).

== Transport ==
Kendrapara is just about 75 kilometres from the state capital, Bhubaneswar. To reach Kendrapara one can go via Cuttack-Jagatpur-Salipur state high way or on the National Highway No.5 and 5 A, crossing at ChandikholViaChhata towards Paradip. Kendrapara is just two and half hour drive from Bhubaneswar Airport on the National Highway 5 and 5 A.(If you go non-stop by your car). The Nearest Railway station is at Cuttack which is 55 kilometre from Kendrapara town.

== Demography ==
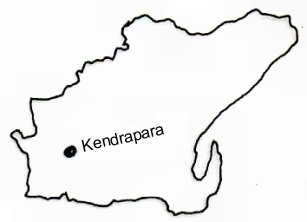
The map of Kendrapara District.

As of the 2001 census, "Karilo patana" had a population of 2,697 in 625 households. The municipality had a sex ratio of 1,000 females per 1,000 males. Kendrapara has an average literacy rate of 77.33%, higher than the national average of 59.5%: male literacy is 87.62%, and female literacy is 67.29%. In Kendrapara, 12% of the population is under 6 years of age. The local language is Odia, the state language, but a high degree of fluency is also present in Hindi, English, as well as some Urdu.

Hindus form the majority of the population. There is a substantial Muslim minority.

== Education ==
In the field of education also Kendrapara is not behind. There are many schools and colleges which are engaged in creating well qualified professionals in all the fields. Some of the educational institutions of Kendrapara are:

- Derabish High School, Derabis
- Kansar Sahaspur High School, Kansar Sahaspur
- Ramachandra High School, Fakirabad
- Chhatabata girls High school, Hafimelak
- Baldevjew High School
- Balia Women's College
- Kendrapara Law College
- Maruti Ucha Bidyapitha, Baghilo
- Panchayat High School, Laxminarayan Pur
- Balia Government High School
- Chandol College
- Kendrapara Institute of Engineering & Technology (KIET) 06727-221003
- Jagulaipara Deshpur Girls High School
- Balia High School
- Derabish College
- PNS Diploma college
- NM Industrial Training Center, Balia, Bhagatpur. Miss Mitali Madhusmita Pradhan Member of Managing Committee
- Bhagabanpur High School
- Kendrapara College
- Naindipur High School by Amar Das
- Bharati Bidya Mandir
- Marsaghai College
- Karilopatna college, Karilopatna
- Dohali High School
- Tulsi Women's College
- Government Girl's High School
- Lokanath Mohavidyalaya, Korua
- Gulnagar High School
- Ichhapur High School
- Kalapada High School
- Ideal Public School
- Unique Public School, Derabis
- Jawahar Navodaya Vidyalaya, Baro
- Joyaram High School Karilopatna
- Kendrapara Boys High School
- Naindipur High School, Naindipur
- Marsaghai High School
- Netaji Subhash English Medium School
- Rajagarh High school
- Saraswati Sisu Vidya Mandir
- Pradhan Patikira M.E. School Written By Pradyumna Kumar Rout (DIPU)
- Unique Public School, Derabis
- St. Joseph School
- Standard Public School
- Sudersan High School, Thakurhat
- Kudanagari High School, Kudanagari
- Balabehari Bidyapitha, Mahal
- Sidha Marichiyani Bidyaptha, Manatir
- Kuanarpal UP School (B) Kuanarpal, Marshaghi, Kendrapara
- Harekrushna High School, Damarpur, Pattamundai
- Pattamundai College, Pattamundai
- S.N. College, Rajkanika
- M.N. High School, Pattamundai

== Community organizations ==
- Mission for Allied Social Service (MASS)
- Sahara Educational And Welfare Trust
