= Jenavali =

Village in Odisha, India

Coordinates: 20.653255°N 86.580521°E

Jenavali is a village in Odisha, India. It is located in the Aali tehsil and Aul block of Kendrapara District. The population of the village is 491 according to the 2011 Census of India.

Jenavali is located about 40 km from the district headquarters Kendrapada and 7 km from the block headquarters. 95% of population depends on Agriculture.
