= Nimapur =

- Village
- Location in Odisha, India
- Coordinates: 20.567509°N 86.610031°E
- Country: India
- State: Odisha

Languages
  - Official: Odia
- Time zone: UTC+5:30 (IST)

Nimapur is a village situated in Kendrapara district in the state of Odisha, India, situated next to the Brahmani river (second largest river in Odisha). The Bay Of Bengal is only few miles away towards the east of Nimapur.

== Education ==
People are well educated in this village. N.S. High School attracts many students from its surrounding villages. With many colleges in its proximity, everybody gets an opportunity for higher education, even staying at home. The village co-located with nimapur is having all the schools i.e. lower primary, primary, middle and high school. The village sasan is itself a gram panchayat and have its panchayat office, RI office and health extension counter.

== Transport ==
The capital city Bhubaneswar is just 120 km away (the route passes through Cuttack, the ancient capital city) and private buses travel to the capital every 30 minutes in the forenoon and is sparse in the afternoon as these vehicles generally return from Puri, Bhubaneswar, Cuttack and Paradeep. A large section of people own two-wheelers and a few people also own four-wheelers.

== Festivals ==
Many Hindu festivals are celebrated in this village such as Karttikeya Puja, Lakshmi Puja, Ganesh Puja and Saraswati Puja. Village temples, Shiva temple and Thakuranhi (the temple of Goddess) also witness many celebrations.

Durga Puja is also celebrated here along with the Khudurukuni Osha (Puja). Raja festival is also enjoyed to a large extent by girls.

"Agira Purnima" is the festival dedicated to the fire god, Agni.

An already existing Radha Krishna temple has been renovated by the people. Sidheswar Math, popularly called Sida Math is another place of worship.
