= Raitundi, Kendrapara =

Coordinates: 20.594615°N 86.323579°E

Raitundi is a village in Kendrapara district of Odisha state, India. It is located near Bazar, Sadanandapur, Panchupandab.
