= Chhanamukhi =

Bangladeshi sweet

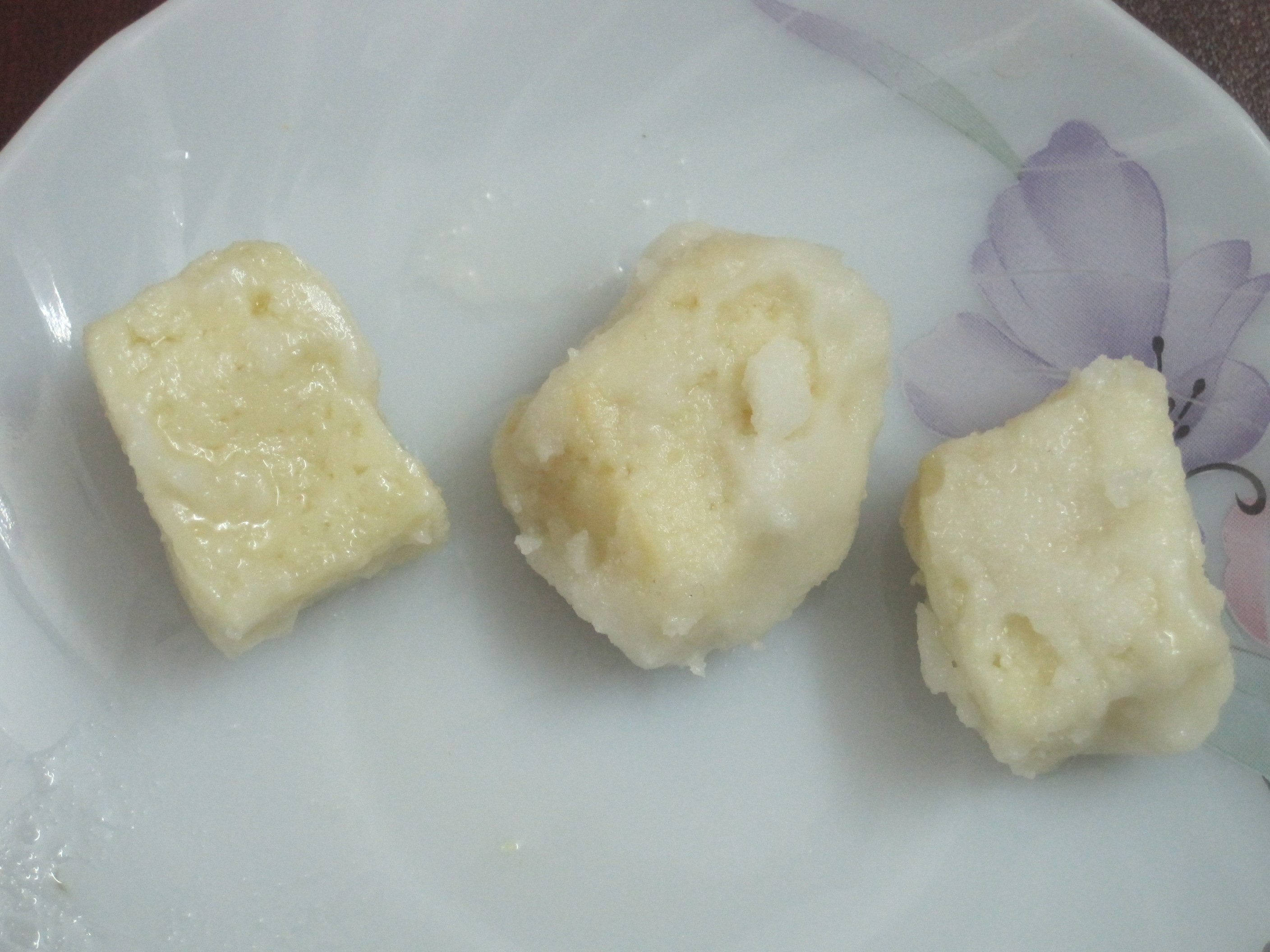
- Chhanamukhi
- Course: Sweets
- Place of origin: Bangladesh
- Region or state: Brahmanbaria
- Associated cuisine: Bangladeshi
- Main ingredients: Chhena, Sugar, Maida

Chhanamukhi (Bengali: ছানামুখী chanamukhi, from Bengali: ছানা chana, “cottage cheese”) is a Bangladeshi sweet. It originated in the Brahmanbaria District. It is made with fried cottage cheese and sugar syrup. On September 24, 2024, Chanamukhi Sweet got recognition as a Geographical Indication (GI) product.

== See also ==
- List of Bangladeshi sweets and desserts
