= Dekani, Kendrapara =

Coordinates: 20.351934°N 86.541552°E

Dekani is a village under Khurusia Grampanchayat of Mahakalpara Block of Kendrapara district, Odisha state, India. As of the 2011 Census of India, it had a population of 519, of which 275 were male and 244 were female. The people are from different castes and belongs to Naisthika Hindus. It is 14 km from the Paradeep port Trust and just 7 km from Bhutmundai.
