= Alabha =

Coordinates: 20.560946°N 86.571168°E

Alabha is a village in Odisha, India. It is also called Alva or Alava. The village has a population of about 4,000 people. The main source of income is agriculture. The nearest city, Kendrapara is about 22 km away from the village. The village is 118 km far from Bhubaneswar.

== Religion ==
There are four temples inside the village, which is primarily Hindu. The main temple is grama devi (village goddess). Maa Budhiani is the mother of the village and is said to protect the village from disasters. The second temple is near a state highway and Maa Mangala temple. The other two temples are dedicated to Shiva and Hanuman.
