= Routa =

Coordinates: 20.630451°N 86.622282°E

Routa is a village in Kendrapara district, Odisha state, India.
