= Chhena poda =

Cheese dessert from Odisha, India

- Course: Dessert
- Place of origin: India
- Region or state: Dashapalla, Odisha, India
- Main ingredients: Chhena cheese, sugar, cashew nuts raisins cardamom

Chhena poda (Odia: ଛେନାପୋଡ଼) (transl. Burnt cheese) is a cheese dessert from the Indian state of Odisha. Chhena poda literally means burnt cheese in Odia.

It is made up of well-kneaded homemade fresh chhena, sugar, semolina, and is baked for several hours until it browns.

Chhenapoda is known as one of the Indian desserts whose flavor is predominantly derived from the caramelisation of sugar.

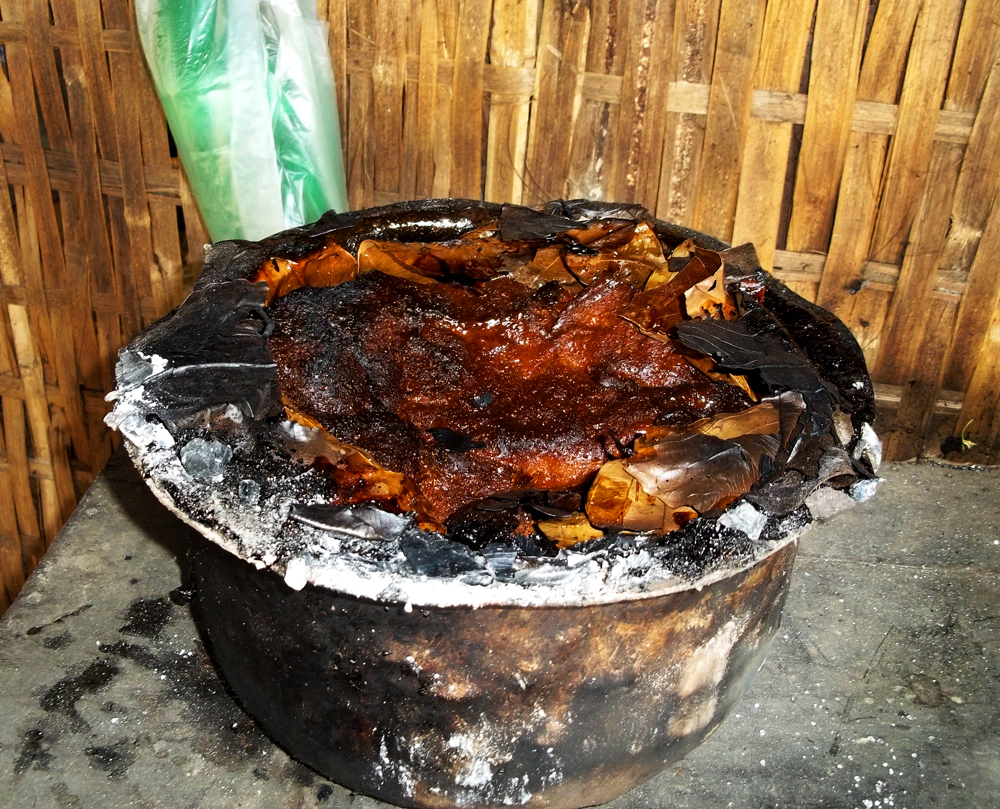
Chenapoda of Pahala, Odisha

== History ==
Chhenapoda was invented by Sudarsan Sahu post 1947 after he set up a hotel in the village of Dashapalla and began experimenting with left over cottage cheese.

Chhenapoda Dibasa is being celebrated since 11 April 2022, the birth anniversary of Sudarsan Sahoo.

== Preparation ==
Chhena poda is usually made at home during traditional festivals in Odisha, such as Durga Puja. Since the mid-1980s, it has gradually found its place in restaurant menus across Odisha. Odisha Milk Federation is investing heavily in mass-producing and popularising this delicacy, determined not to let this happen again.

== See also ==
- Rasabali
- Rasgulla
- Chhena gaja
- Kheersagar
- Chhena kheeri
- Chhena jalebi
- List of Indian sweets and desserts
- Oriya cuisine
