= Baladevjew Temple =

- Location within Odisha Location within India

Religion
- Affiliation: Hinduism
- District: Kendrapara
- Deity: Baladevjew

Location
- Location: Ichhapur
- State: Odisha
- Country: India
- Coordinates: 20.241950°N 85.835103°E

Architecture
- Type: Kalinga Architecture
- Temple: 1

Baladevjew Temple is a Hindu temple in Ichhapur (Tulasi Khetra), Kendrapara, Odisha, India. Baladevjew (Balarama) is the main divinity. His siblings Jagannath and Subhadra are also worshipped in the Ratna Sinhasan (Gem Throne) in the main temple.

== History ==
It is believed that Khan-I-Duran, the subedar of Odisha during the Mughal Emperor Aurangzeb's reign demolished the original temple of Baladevjew in 1661 and built a mosque on the remains of the temple. Devotees took the deity in disguise in a boat through the river Govari and kept him in a secret place near Baranga (Chhedara) Jungle. Afterwards it was shifted to Balarampur village near Luna river at Sakhi Bata. Later it was transferred to the present day Icchapur temple.

The present temple of Siddha Baladevajew was constructed during the Maratha rule in Odisha (1761) of Ichhapur (Kendrapara). It was constructed by the king of Kujanga, Raja Gopal Sandha and Zamindar of Chhedara killah, Srinivas Narendra Mahapatra. One saint (Santha) Gopi Das and Sairatak Giri convinced the then Maratha Senasahibsubha Janoji Bhonsle and constructed the Jagamohana (assembly hall), Bhoga Mandapa (hall of offerings) of the main temple, temple of Gundicha and compound wall.

== Architecture ==
Baladevjew Temple is constructed over an area of 2 acres (0.81 ha) of land. There are 2 parts in the total area. In one part, different temples are there and the other part is a garden. There is a boundary around the temple, 46 feet (14 m) high.

There are four main parts of Baladevjew Temple are

1. Bada Deula or Sri Mandir (main temple containing sanctum)
2. Majhi Mandir or Bhoga Mandapa (hall of offerings)
3. Jagamohana or Natya Mandir (assembly hall)
4. Bata Mandir or Mukhashala (leading hall)

The main temple is 75 feet (23 m) high and 40 feet (12 m) wide. The main temple has a 7 step construction made of heavy baulamalia stone. (Note: A type of coloured soft stone)

The goddess Tulasi in a seated position is also worshipped in Adhistati Devi Tulasi temple after the sacred seven steps.

There are other small temples in the premises, dedicated to various deities: Lakshmi, Bhairabi (Bhairavi), Nabagraha (Navagraha), Shiva in forms of Kasi Biswonath, Astasambhu Mahadev and Sidheswar Mahadev; Rama and Ganesha.

The other important parts of the temple are Garuda Stambha, Ratna Bhandar (treasure room), Snana Mandapa (hall of bathing), Mukti Mandapa (congregation hall of scholars), Jhulan Gruha and Anand Bazar.

== Rituals ==
The deities of Baladevjew, Jagannath and Subhadra are decorated in different clothes during important festivals. This tradition is known as Besha (alankara, religious adornment).

Some important Beshas are

1. Raghunatha Besha on Chaitra Purnima Festival
2. Padma Besha on Kartik Purnima Festival and Tulsi Vivah in Kartik
3. Gamhabhisheka Besha – From Shraavana Sukla Dashami to Purnima, holy srinakshatra ceremony of Balarama
4. Pushyabhisheka Besha on Pausha Purnima festival
5. Kanchi Kaveri Besha on Vasant Panchami festival
6. Suna Besha (Bali Vamana Besha) on Bhadrapad Dwadashi Day
7. Krishna Balarama Besha on Phalguna Purnima festival
8. Dwibinda banara besha that was offered by Pandit Binod Behari Dash who was a famous Sanskrit scholar of Ichhapur, Kendrapada

The Rath Yatra here is famous for the Brahma Taladhwaja Rath.

== Offerings ==
There are arrangements for three main Naivedya offerings (Dhupa) and 3 minor offerings (Abakasha) for the deities daily.

1. Morning offering (Sakala Dhupa)
2. Offering at pre-noon (Madhhyanna Dhupa)
3. Rice offering ( Dwiprahara Dhupa/ Anna Dhupa)
4. Offering at evening ( Sandhya Aarati Dhupa)
5. Rice offering ( Nisankhudi Dhupa)
6. Offering at night ( Badasinghar Dhupa)

Different types of offerings (prasad) are made with trained traditional families, called as Supakara and Mekap are engaged solely for deities. Some of the delicacies are highly patronized in different historic regimes. A comprehensive list of the delicacies is given below.

Baula Gaintha, Upana Pitha, Mithei, Chaurashi Vyanjana(84 vegetable Curry), Makara Chaula, Bhaja, Ghia Anna, Dali, Phalamula (fruits and roots), Dry sweets, Ghanavarta, Pura Kakara, Rasabali, Putuli Pitha, Chipa Kakara, Karanji, Khaja, Magaja Ladoo, Dalimba, Khuduma, Nishkudi, Mutha Gaja, Tala, Chhena Chakata are the famous ones.
