= Lia (food) =

Indian prepared food

Lia, ଲିଆ
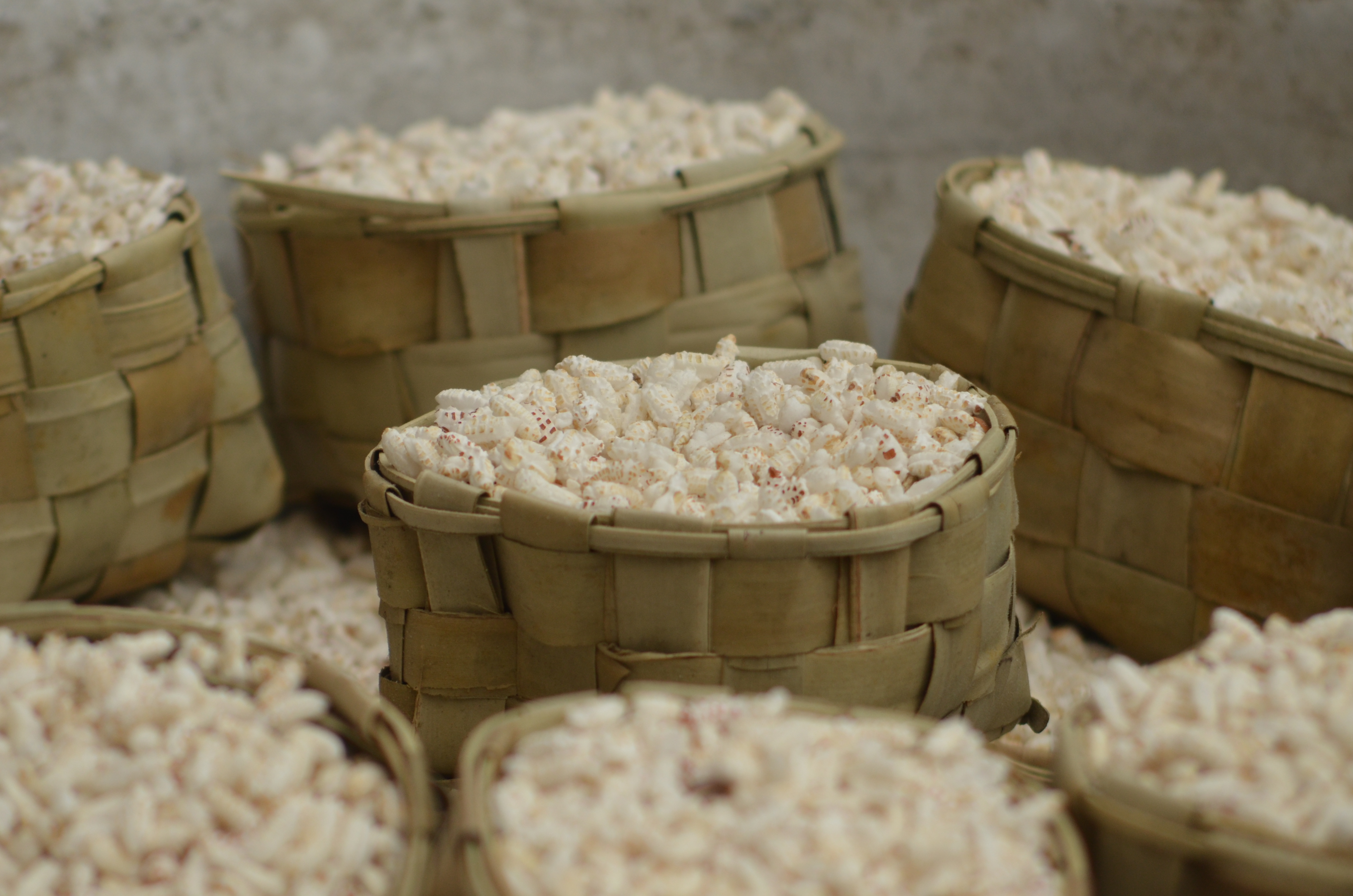
- Khai offered to Jagannatha in Badadanda, Puri.
- Course: Ukhuda, Korakhai, Khai
- Place of origin: India
- Region or state: Odisha
- Main ingredients: Fried rice

Liā (Odia: ଲିଆ) (fried paddy) is a prepared food from rice mainly consumed in the region of Odisha, India. The other varieties are Khåi (Odia: ଖଇ) (fried paddy) and Ukhuṛā (Odia: ଉଖୁଡ଼ା) (fried paddy sweetened by jaggery). It is a form of puffed rice (rice puffs while roasting it with heated sand) which is added with jaggery syrup. "Kora Khai", a foodstuff derived from "khai" is offered to Lingaraj in Lingaraja temple, Bhubaneswar.
