= Chhena gaja =

Odia sweet dish

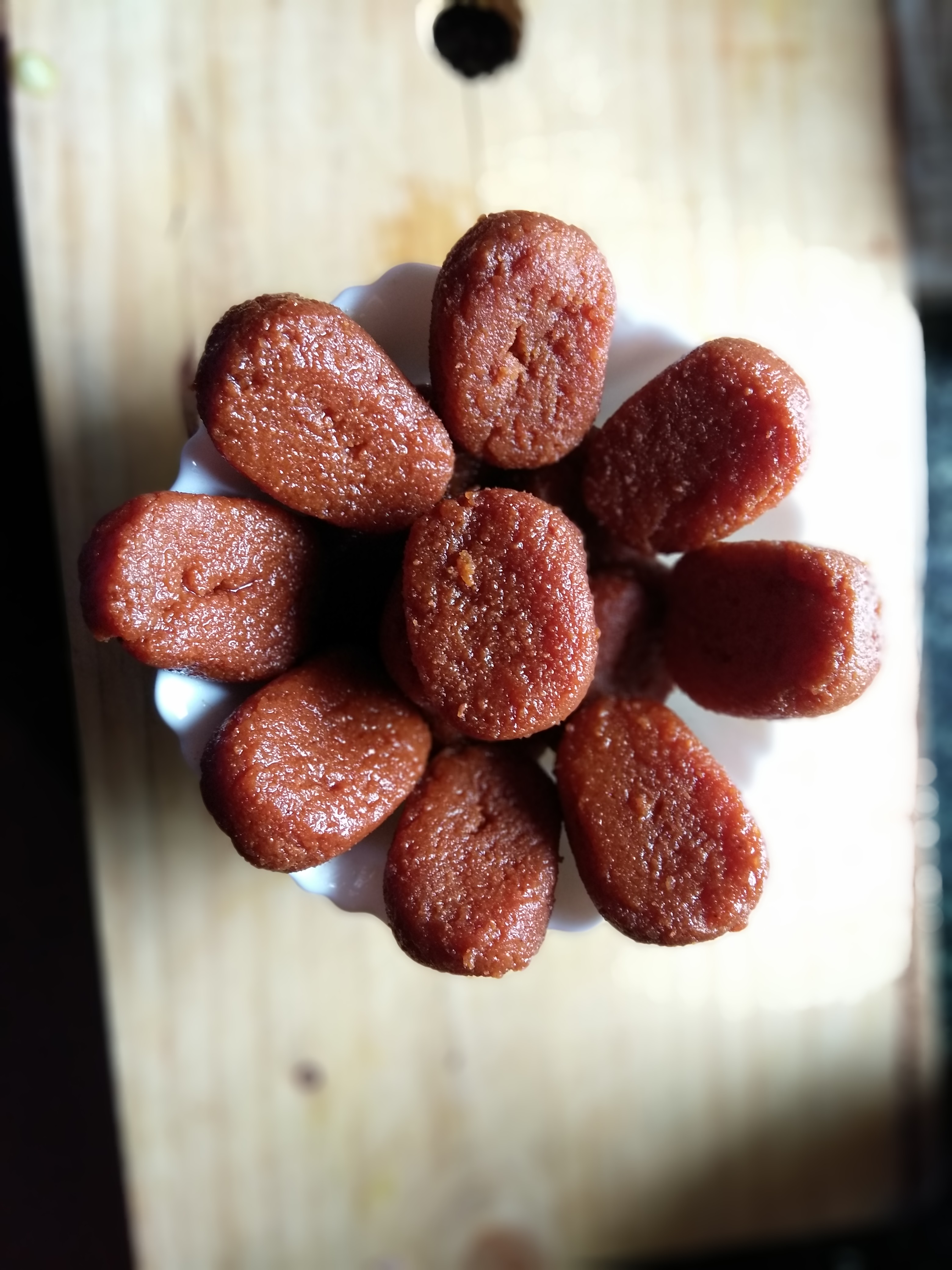
- Chhena gaja
- Alternative names: Chhena gaja
- Course: Dessert
- Place of origin: Balasore
- Region or state: Odisha, India
- Main ingredients: Chhena
- Food energy (per serving): 200-250 kcal\50-60 grams

Chhena gaja (Odia: ଛେନା ଗଜା) is a popular sweet dish from the Indian state of Odisha. Unlike other popular chhena-based Odia desserts, such as rasagola, which have spread throughout India, the chhena gaja remains largely popular within the state itself.

Although the ingredients of chhena gaja are essentially the same as that of rasagola and chhena poda, the dishes are very different in taste.

While chhena gaja is popular throughout Odisha, the village of Pahala, near Bhubaneswar, is particularly known for preparing and selling it.

== Preparation ==
Chhena gajas are prepared by combining chhena, similar to cottage cheese, and sooji (semolina), and kneading the dough thoroughly. Water is squeezed out from the mixture, which is then dried briefly until it acquires the right consistency. It is then molded into palm-sized rectangular shapes (gajas), boiled in thick sugar syrup. Sometimes, the gajas are then allowed to dry a little more, in which case the sugar may occasionally crystallize on the surface.

== See also ==
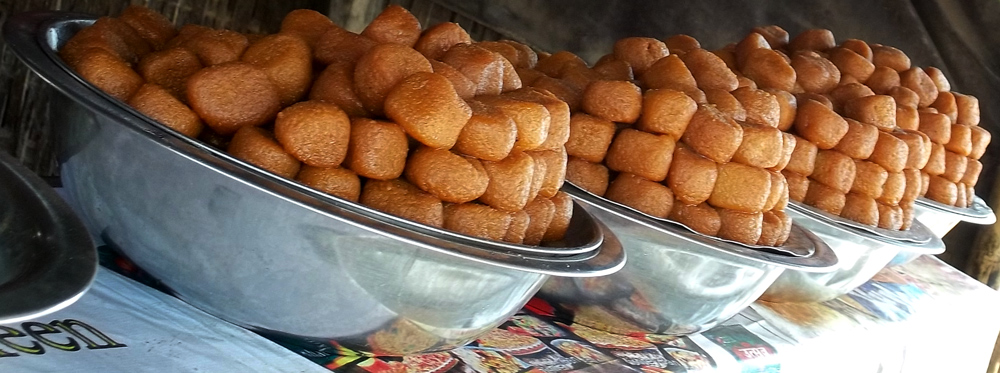
Chenagaja from Pahala, Orissa

- Chhena jalebi
- Chhena kheeri
- Chhena poda
- Khira sagara
- Rasabali
- Rasagolla
- List of cheese dishes
