= Thermoduric bacterium =

Thermoduric bacteria are bacteria which can survive, to varying extents, the pasteurisation process. Species of bacteria which are thermoduric include Bacillus, Clostridium and Enterococci.
