= Kendrapara =

- Town
- Interactive map of Kendrapara
- Location in Odisha, India Kendrapara (India)
- Coordinates: 20°30′12″N 86°25′10″E
- Country: India
- State: Odisha
- District: Kendrapara

Government
  - Type: Municipality
  - Body: Kendrapara Municipality
  - Rank: 29
- Elevation: 13 m (43 ft)

Population (2001)
  - Total: 41,404

Languages
  - Official: Odia, English
- Time zone: UTC+5:30 (IST)
- PIN: 754211
- Telephone code: 06727
- Vehicle registration: OD 29 (OR 29)
- Website: kendrapara.nic.in

Kendrapara, officially Kendrapada, is a town (municipality) and the headquarters of Kendrapara district of the Indian state of Odisha.

== Geography ==
Kendrapara is located at 20.50°N 86.42°E. It has an average elevation of 13 m (43 ft). It is surrounded by Bhadrak, Jajpur, Cuttack and Jagatsinghpur districts, with the Bay of Bengal to the east.

The river Chitroptala (a branch of the Mahanadi) flows through Kendrapara district. Other rivers in Kendrapara include the Luna, the Karandia, the Gobari, the Brahamani, the Birupa, the Kani, the Hansua, the Baitarani, the Kharasrota, and the Paika. This district has 9 blocks, which are Aali, Derabish, Garadpur, Mahakalapada, Marshaghai, Kendrapara, Rajanagar, Rajkanika, Pattamundai.

== Transport ==
To reach Kendrapara one can take the Jagatpur-Salipur State Highway SH-9A or National Highways 16 and 53. Kendrapara is a two and a half hour drive from Bhubaneswar Airport on National Highway 16 and State Highway 9A. The nearest railway station is at Cuttack, which is 54 kilometres from the Kendrapara township on State Highway 9A.

== Demography ==
Historical population
Year	Pop.	±%
1872	13,268	—
1881	15,696	+18.3%
1891	17,647	+12.4%
1901	15,245	−13.6%
1911	15,113	−0.9%
1921	14,613	−3.3%
1931	12,620	−13.6%
1941	11,880	−5.9%
1951	12,253	+3.1%
1961	15,830	+29.2%
1971	20,079	+26.8%
1981	27,584	+37.4%
1991	35,015	+26.9%
2001	41,407	+18.3%
2011		—
Source: Census of India

As of the 2011 Indian census, Kendrapara district has a population of 1,439,891, roughly equal to the nation of Eswatini or the US state of Hawaii. This gives it a population ranking of 344th in India (out of a total of 640 districts). The district has a population density of 545 inhabitants per square kilometre (1,410 /sq mi). Its population growth rate over the 2001–2011 decade was 10.59%. Kendrapara has a sex ratio of 1006 females for every 1000 males, and a literacy rate of 85.93%. The mother tongue of most of the residents of Kendrapara is Odia. However, there is a sizable population of Bengali. Hindi and English are also widely understood.

Hindus encompass the majority of the population. There is a substantial Muslim minority.

Most of the residents of Kendrapara are farmers. Some do business and some fish in the rivers and the Bay of Bengal. Some people also grow prawn near the sea shore, as it is profitable. Many small-scale industries are appearing in the area and bringing job opportunities.

Religions in Kendrapara
Religion	Percent
Hinduism	67.91%
Islam	31.64%
Others	0.45%
Others include Buddhists, Jains and Sikhs

== Culture ==
The Baladevjew Temple is located in Kendrapara district of Odisha. A Chariot Festival, or Rath Yatra, is held in the month of Ashadha (June/July) every year. The chariot of Lord Baladevjew is known as Brahma Taladhwaja and is considered the biggest chariot of its type in the world.

The Gajalaxmi puja on Kojagari Purnima or Kumar Purnima Durga Puja at Amruta Manohi village is celebrated in the month of October, and Kartikeya Puja and Maa Kali Puja at Olaver are held in November each year. Gajalaxmi puja is a big festival in Kendrapara and is celebrated for 7 days.

Maa Basanti Durga Puja in Basupur has been one of the region's most famous festivals for over 80 years. The Odia sweet dish, Rasabali, originated in Kendrapara. Kendrapara is also known as Tulasi Ksherta (as Tulasi, different from Basil a.k.a. Tulsi, the wife of Lord Balabhadra) and Gupta Kshetra (Lord Balabhadra wished to stay here secretly). Different types of prasad prepared and used in Baladevjew Temple are Rasabali, Potali Pitha, Magaja Ladoo, Kakaraa, Khaja, Karanji, Chhena Kheeri, Ghanabrata, Dahipakhala, Khiri, and Puri.

One of the most popular festivals, Kartikaswar Puja, is held on the banks of the Luna at Kalapada Kendrapara. It has also been known as the Kendrapara Boita Bandhana Utchav ingratiation every year since 2005.

== Tourist Places ==
Bhitara Kanika

Bhitarakanika is covered in deep mangrove forests and saline rivers. It was declared a wildlife sanctuary on 21 April 1975. It is known as a natural crocodile breeding ground. Other animals like deer, wild boar, monkeys, monitor lizards, pythons, and king cobra are also found here. The national park has an area of around 145 square kilometres. It is 160 kilometres away from the state capital of Bhubaneswar.

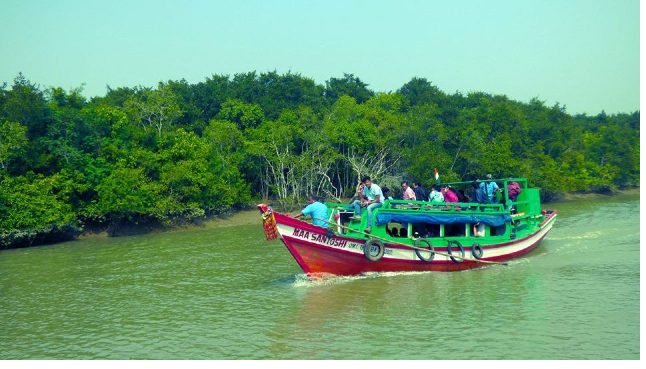
Sightseeing at Bhitarakanika

Batighar is the location of the first lighthouse on the eastern coast of India. It is situated on the bank of the Kharinasi River. The height of the lighthouse is 125 feet. Construction of the lighthouse was started on 6 December 1836 and it was lighted on 16 October 1837.

Kanika Palace is a massive palace constructed by the King of Kanika. It was constructed on an area of 4 acres of land and the height of the structure is of 75 feet. It is situated in Rajkanika Block.

Aali Palace is situated near Aali Township. It is an ancient palace spread over 40 acres of land.

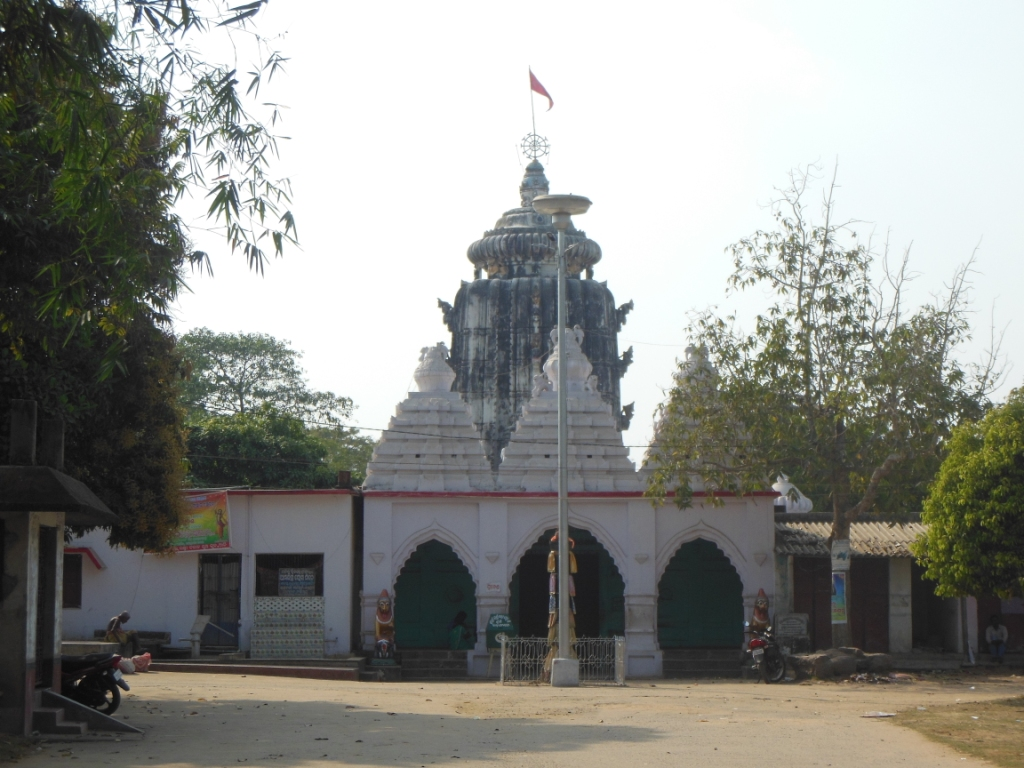
Lakhmi Varaha Temple, Aali

Lakhmi Varaha Temple is a 500-year-old Indian temple dedicated to Varaha, the boar incarnation of Vishnu. The temple is located in Aali. The temple is about one kilometre away from the centre of Tehsil Aali, which is situated about 146 km from the state capital of Bhubaneswar. It is 17 km from Pattamundai and 38 km from Kendrapara.

Garteswar Temple is situated at Gosigan near Rajnagar, Kendrapara. It is an ancient Shiv temple.

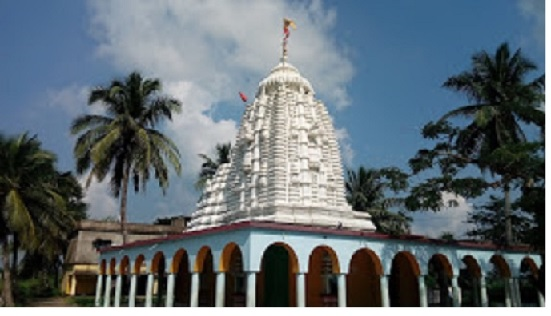
Garteswar Temple, Gosigan, Rajnagar

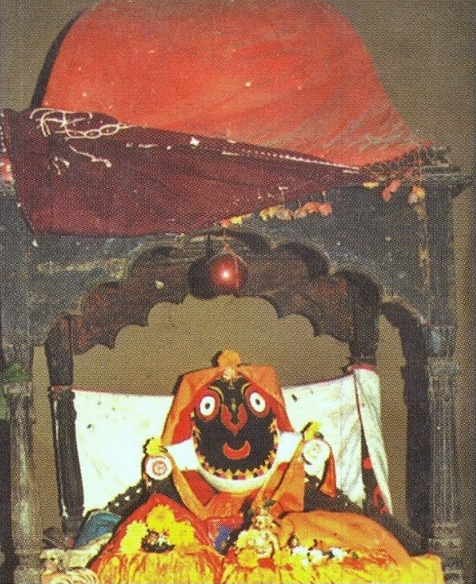
The old Dadhivaman deity in Kendrapara.

Shri Dadhivaman Temple is a 14th-century-old Jaganath temple worshipped by Srila Bhakti Vinod Thakur's forefather Krishnananda.

Sakhibata is a 500-year-old Banyan tree at Sakhibata in Kendrapara district. The large tree, spread across 1.3 acres of land with about 600 trunks and sub-trunks, has been granted tourist spot status by the state government following active tourism in the area throughout the year. District Tourist Officer Bijoy Kumar Mohanty stated that funds had been sanctioned for building tourism infrastructure. The banyan tree withstood the devastation of the 1999 Super Cyclone. A 200-year-old temple is still intact at the spot, a reminder of the location's historic importance.

Badakotha is an old building near the Kendrapara bus stand. It used to be the only 2 floor building in Radhashyam Narendra.

Harihar Kshetra, Mahala is a famous temple situated at Mahala of Bangalpur GP in the Garadpur Block.

Sri Chhualia Shakti Peeth is a tourist attraction and shrine in Pattamundai block. It is equidistant from the nearest towns of Kendrapara and Pattamundai (12 km). The attraction is surrounded by Sahada trees. Other trees like Kadamba, Krushnachuda, Panihenduli, Ashosth are also available here. Maa, the deity, takes nonvegetarian food offerings (bhoga) such as fish. However, meats and wine are strictly prohibited. Dola Melan, Raja, Panchuka, Biswasanti Mahayajnya, Asta Prahar Namayajnya are the main yearly festivals of this Peeth.

Hukitola is a storm proof bunker constructed on Jamboo island by the British, led by Captain Harris. It consists of 11 large size and 9 small size chambers.

Eka Kula is a unique island in Kendrapara, which can be reached via bike during low tide and via boats from Jambu.

There are many picnic spots in and around Kendrapara. Paradeep is a 20–30 km drive from Kendrapara.

Most popular Udaya Giri & Ratna Giri is a 10–15 km drive from Kendrapara. Mainly Budhu Murti and Budhu pratima are conserved there.

There is also a picnic spot called Sakhi Bata situated near the Luna River.

The Lord Mahaveer temple is located at new Chandan Pokhari, Ichhapur, Kendrapara.

Pentha is situated in between the rivers Chitrotpala & Luna (Karandia). It's only 12 km from Kendrapara township and 5 km from Patkura. Direct buses are available from Cuttack to Pentha. The village is known for the Maa Sata Bhauni Temple (among the most ancient temples of Odisha), which is situated in the middle of the village, and Maa Kharakhai (Goddess Dhumabati), Gopinathjew Temple, Ram Mandir, Sarala Mandir, Tarini Temple, Hanumanjew Temple, and Nilakantheswar Temple. The Sandhha Nacha (in the memory of Sandha Raja of Kunjang Garh) is celebrated at Dola Purnima. The Rama Charita Manas & Parayan is celebrated for 9 days of every year on the occasion of Lord Hanuman's birthday. Pentha is also the birthplace of the poet and writer Kabibar Parida.

Sialiaa is situated in the Rajkanika block. The main attraction of this village is that there are no doors in the houses of the villagers.

Ma Patharakani Temple is situated at the SH-9A Main Road near Gogua Market, Jawahar Navodaya Vidyalaya, Kendrapara. It is situated between Kendrapara and Pattamundai.

== Education ==
There are many schools and colleges in Kendrapara. Kendrapara Autonomous College, situated in Kendrapara town, is the largest college of higher education in the district. Other institutions include Pattamundai College, Sailendra Narayan College in Rajkanika, and Kendrapara High School (the oldest high school in the district, established in 1863). The second oldest high school in the district is R. N. High School Rajkanika, which was established in the year 1918. Jamia Ashraful Uloom, an Islamic seminary established in 1937 and re-opened in 1984, is also located in the town and provides religious as well as general education.

== Notable people ==
Kendrapara has produced a number of well-known personalities like astronomer, mathematician, and writer Suskhma Sphuta Siddhanta Pandit Sri Gokulananda Routroy (1947–2009), Pandit Binod Behari Dash, media personalities like Itishree Nayak (Rajiv Gandhi Sadbhavana Award for Electronic Media Odia 2006). Another notable person from this area is Dr. Prafulla Kumar Behera, one of the scientists involved in the development of silicon pixel detectors, which played a big part in the success of the Higgs Boson experiment.

== Politics ==
Kendrapara is part of Kendrapara (Lok Sabha constituency). Its current Member of Parliament is Baijayant Panda . The three major political parties in the Kendrapara Assembly and Parliament are the Bharatiya Janata Party, the Biju Janata Dal and the Indian National Congress Party.

Politics has remained within local parties since the 1970s. Kendrapara has played a crucial role in Odisha's politics, producing leaders like Member of Parliament Rabi Ray, the Speaker in Loksabha, and Biju Patnaik, former Chief Minister of Odisha.

The current MLA from Kendrapara Assembly Constituency is Sashi Bhusan Behera from BJD, who won the seat in state elections of 2019.

Previous MLAs of this seat include:

- Kishore Tarai of BJD in 2014
- Sipra Malick of BJD in 2009
- Utkal Keshari Parida of OGP in 2004
- Bed Prakash Agarwalla representing BJP in 2000, representing JD in 1990, and representing JNP in 1977
- Bhagabat Prasad Mohanty of INC in 1995 and in 1985
- Indramani Rout of INC (I) in 1980
