= Chomchom =

Traditional Bengali sweet

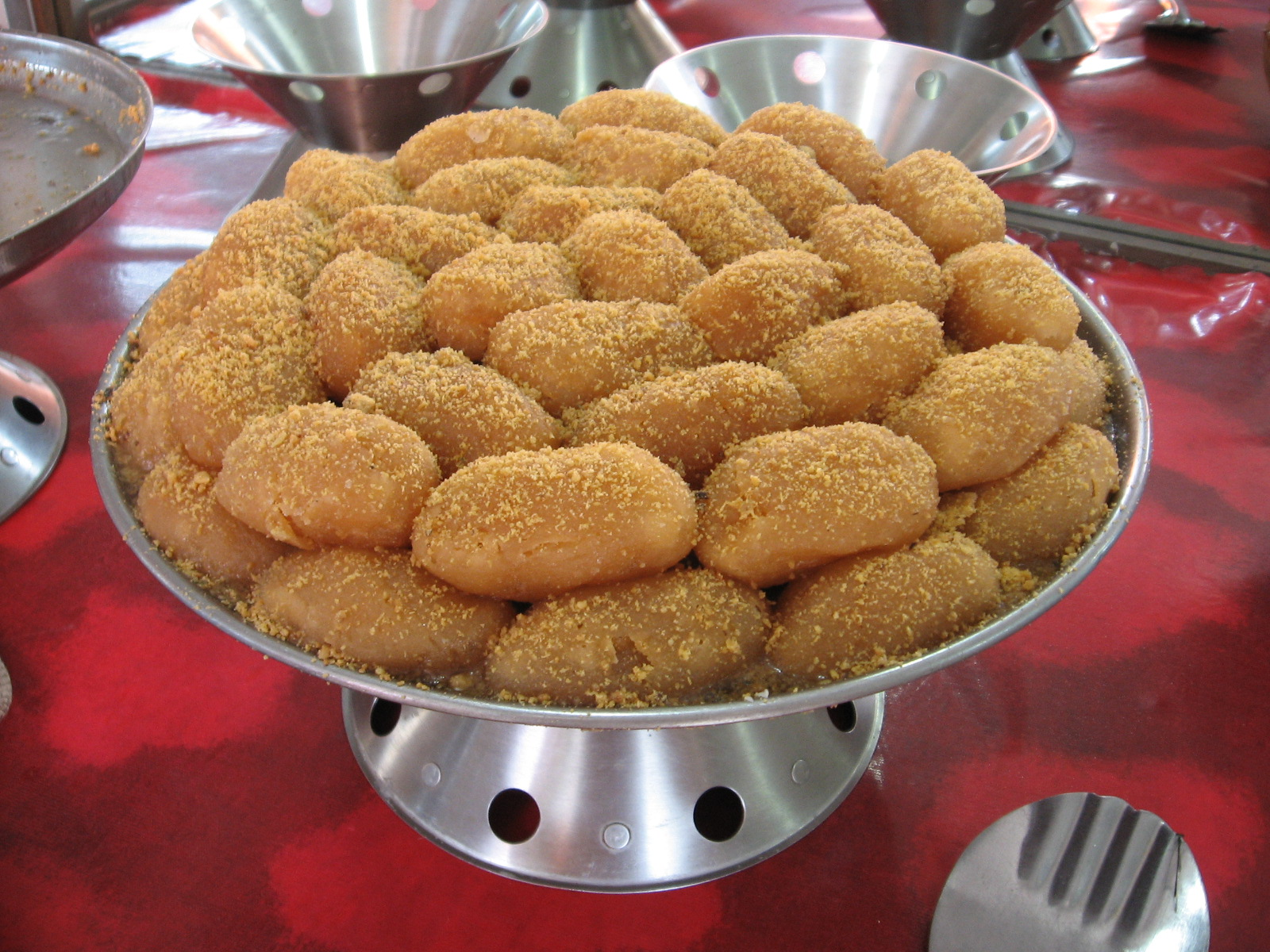
- Chomchom/Chamcham of Tangail
- Alternative names: Chamcham
- Course: Dessert
- Place of origin: Bangladesh
- Region or state: South Asia
- Associated cuisine: Bangladeshi cuisine, Indian cuisine, Pakistani cuisine
- Main ingredients: milk, flour, cream, sugar
- Variations: Tangail's Chomchom

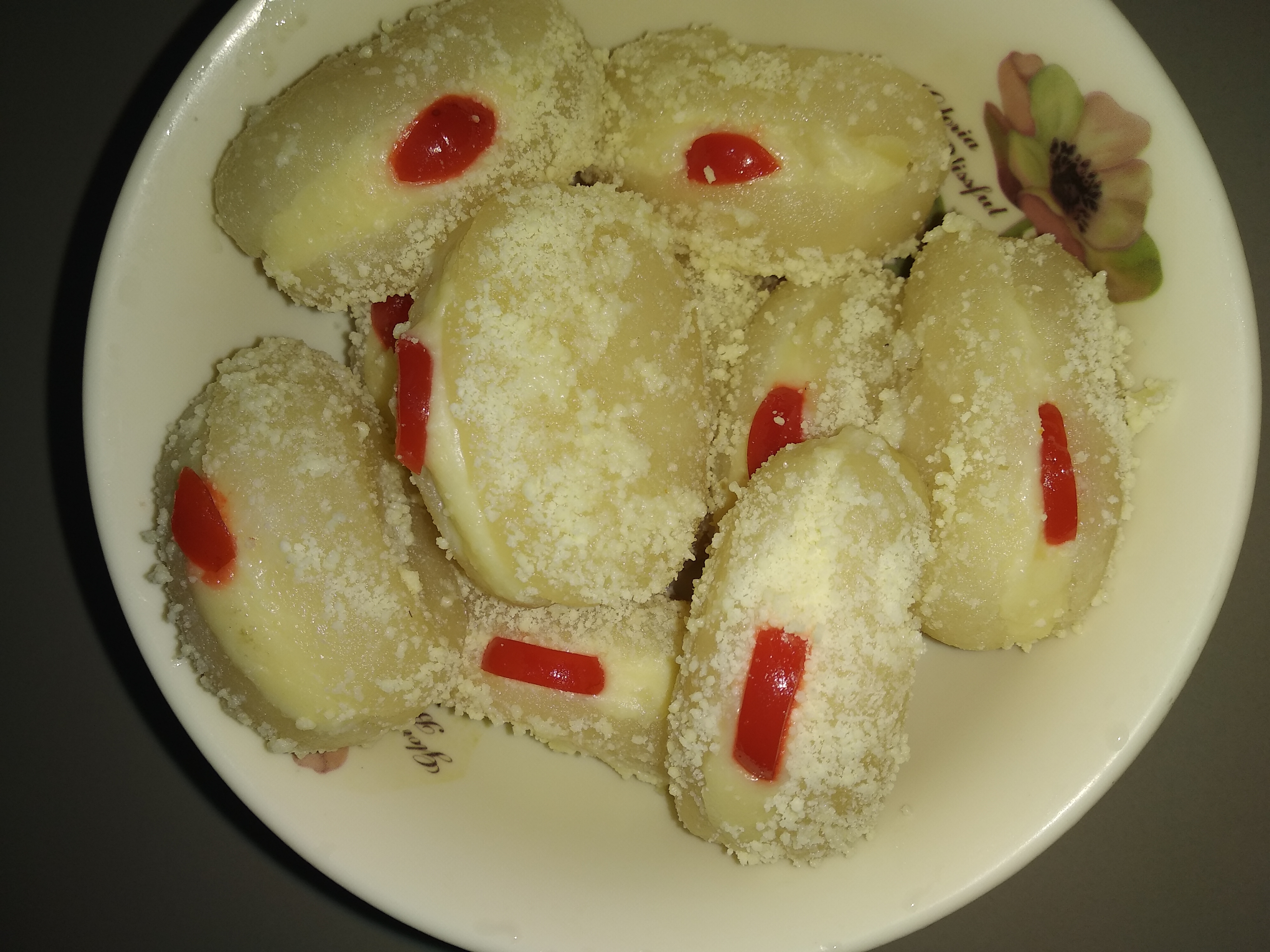
Cherry Cham cham

Cham cham, Chomchom or chum chum (Bengali: চমচম) is a traditional Bengali sweet, common throughout the Indian subcontinent. The sweet comes in a variety of colours, mainly light pink, light yellow, and white. It is made from chhena and coated with coconut or mawa flakes as a garnish.

== History ==
Chomchom originated from Tangail District. Chamcham, an oval-shaped brownish variety of chomchom from Porabari in Tangail District of modern-day Bangladesh, dates back to the mid-19th century. The unique taste has been attributed to the water in Porabari.

Jagadish Mishtanno Bhandar in Khustia District makes a version known as Maowar Chomchom.

Chomchom is a popular item in Chaand Raat, Eids, Pohela Boishak, the Bengali new year, and Durga Puja.

== See also ==
- Rasgulla
- Sandesh
