= Khira sagara =

Odia sweet dish made from Indian cheese

Khīrå sāgårå
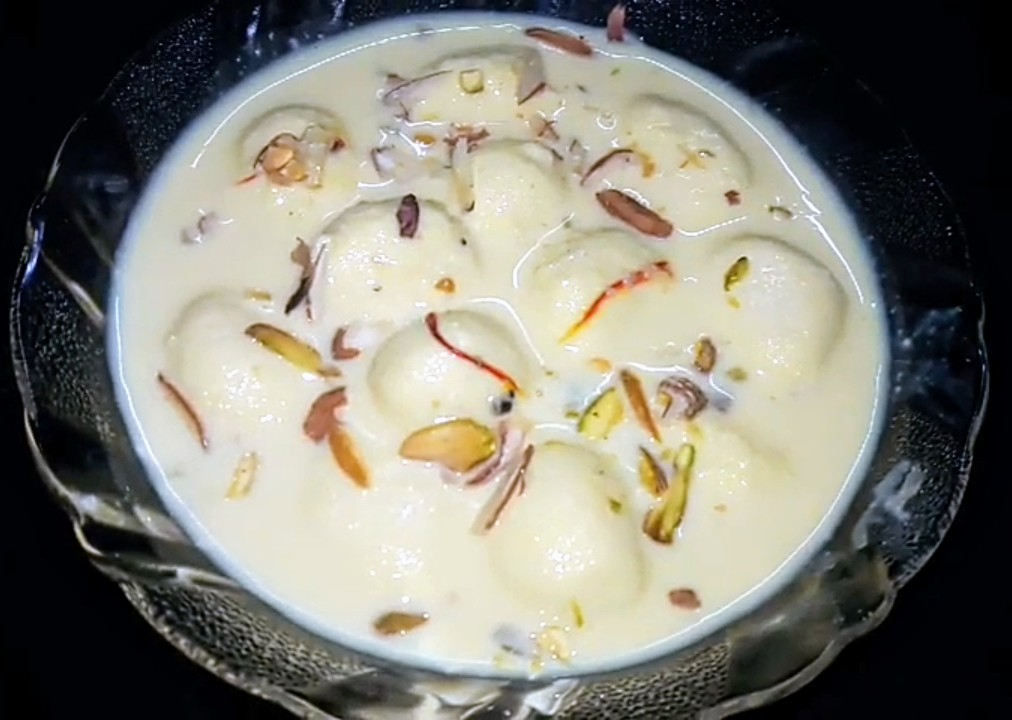
- Khirå sāgårå
- Alternative names: Kheersagar
- Course: Dessert
- Place of origin: India
- Region or state: Odisha
- Associated cuisine: Indian
- Serving temperature: Room temperature or chilled
- Main ingredients: Milk, sugar, chhena, saffron, cardamom

Khīrå sāgårå (Odia: କ୍ଷୀର ସାଗର) is an Odia sweet dish that literally translates to ocean of milk in Odia language. The sweet has depiction in Hindu scriptures about Lakshmi serving Vishnu and Madhusudana with it.

Khīrå sāgårå consists of marble-sized balls of chhena cheese soaked in sweetened, condensed milk. Saffron and cardamoms are the typical seasonings that are added to this dish. Khirå sagårå is typically served either at room temperature or slightly chilled.

However, the milk base in khirå sāgårå is thicker, acquiring the consistency of rabri.

== See also ==
- Chhena gaja
- Chhena jalebi
- Chhena kheeri
- Chhena poda
- Kheer
- Rasabali
- Rasagolla
