= Rasabali =

Sweet dish from Odisha, India

Rasabali (ରସାବଳୀ)
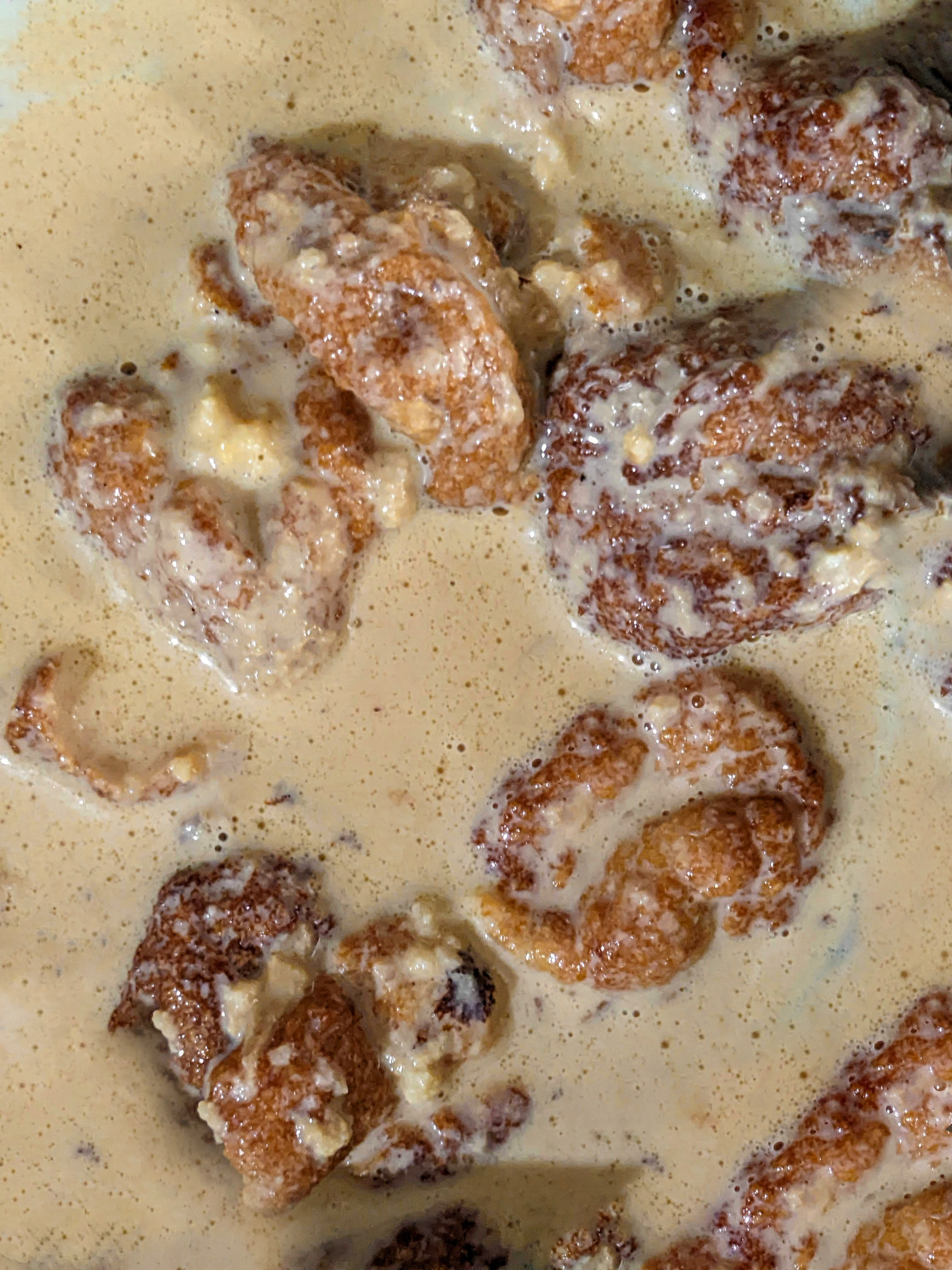
- Place of origin: Kendrapara, Odisha, India
- Main ingredients: Chhena; Rabri

Rasabali (Odia: ରସାବଳୀ, IAST: rasābaḷi) is a sweet dish from Odisha, India. It consists of deep fried flattened reddish brown patties of chhena (farmer cheese) that are soaked in thickened, sweetened milk (rabri). Flattening the chhena into palm-sized patties is done in order to allow them to absorb the milk more readily. The thickened milk is also usually lightly seasoned with crushed cardamom pods.

Rasabali is offered to Baladevjew, and originated in the Baladevjew Temple of Kendrapara. It is one of the Chapana bhoga of Puri's Jagannath Temple. It received a GI tag on 3 October 2023.

== See also ==
- Chhena gaja
- Rasagolla
- Chhena poda
- Khira sagara
- Chhena kheeri
- Chhena jalebi
