= Chhena =

Type of cheese curds originating in India

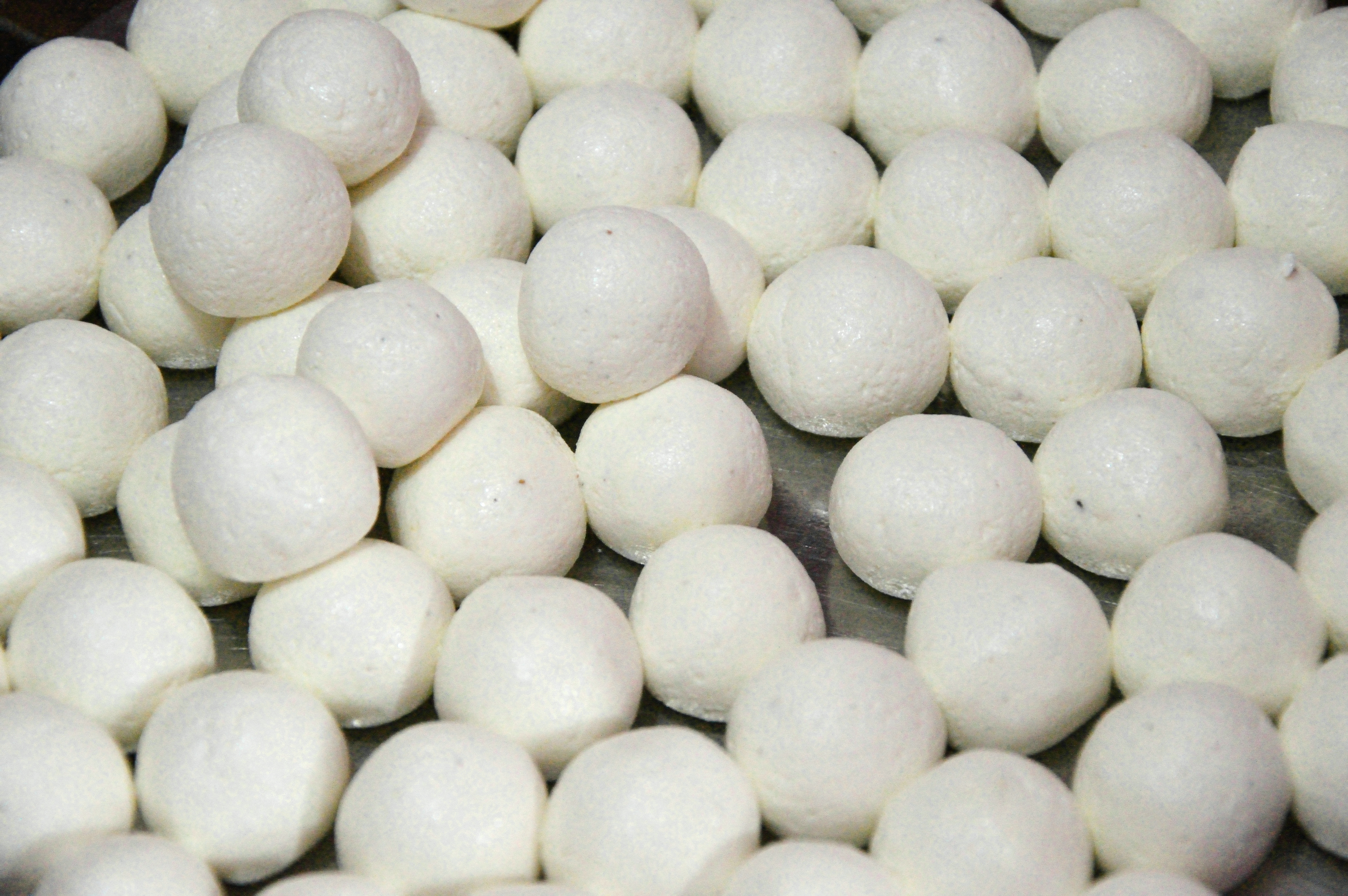
- Chhena formed into balls to make rosogolla
- Type: Cheese
- Place of origin: Indian subcontinent
- Main ingredients: Milk
- Food energy (per 1 cup serving): 719 calories
Nutritional value
(per 1 cup serving)
- Protein: 8g g
- Fat: 9g g
- Carbohydrate: 10g g

Chhena (Hindustani: [ˈtʃʰeːna]) ଛେନ୍ନା in Odia or chhana (Bengali: [tʃʰana]) ছানা in Bengali, is a kind of acid-set cheese originating in the Indian subcontinent that is made from water buffalo or cow milk by adding food acids such as lemon juice and calcium lactate instead of rennet and straining out the whey.

Chhena is pressed and may be further processed to make paneer, a form of farmer cheese, or formed into balls to make desserts such as khira sagara, chhena kheeri, rasabali and ras malai, as well as sweets from the Indian subcontinent (mitha or Misti or mithai) such as chhena jalebi, chhena gaja, chhena poda, pantua, rosogolla, and sandesh. For the sweets, mostly cow milk chhena is used.

Chhena is produced in Odisha, West Bengal, eastern India and Bangladesh, and it is generally made from cow or buffalo milk. In India, it is a legal requirement for Chhena to have no more than 70% of moisture content, and 50% of milk fat in dry material The production of chhena in India was estimated to be 200,000 tonnes annually in 2009. Production is highest in the state of Uttar Pradesh, while consumption is highest in the state of West Bengal.

Sahu and Das conducted a study of milk consumption in India and found that 6% of milk produced in India is used in the chhena production process. It is closely related to paneer cheese as they both share a similar production process, but it is kneaded when it is still warm in the manufacturing process. The result is a cheese with a 'smooth, whipped-cream consistency', unlike paneer, which is firm.

== History ==
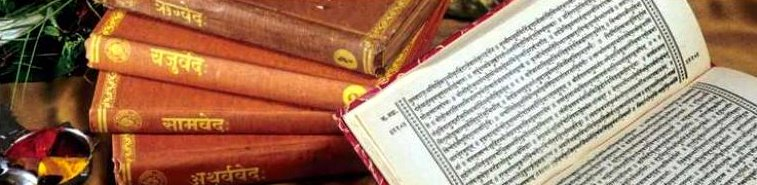
The Four Vedas, the oldest scriptures of Hinduism

The Vedas, the oldest scriptures of Hinduism, contain a reference to 'dadhanvat', which has been translated as referencing an 'abundance of curds'. Chitra Banerji states that in the life of Krishna there is reference to dairy products such as 'milk, butter, ghee and yogurt', but not to chhena. Catherine Donnelly, author of The Oxford Companion to Cheese (2016), said that Vedic literature refers to cheese production made with the aid of barks of palash tree (Butea monosperma), fruits like jujube (Ziziphus mauritiana) and creepers like putika with coagulating enzymes, "as well as Dadhanvat, a cheeselike substance made with and without pores". According to Donnelly, these plant substances may have contained rennet-like enzymes and notes that the "Vedas may include some of the earliest known references to rennet-coagulated cheeses". Lokopakara text dated to the 10th century gives two recipes for coagulated cheeses made from buffalo milk for making sweets using plants and roots. According to the text, buffalo milk was coagulated using roots of amaranth plant or leaves of marsh barbel (hygrophila auriculata); the soft cheese produced in this manner was called Haluvuga. In the second recipe, buffalo milk was coagulated with Indian mallow (abutilon indicum) or country mallow (sida cordifolia) and was made into balls for sweets. The Manasollasa, one of the medieval Indian cooking texts, was written during the reign of King Somesvara III in the 12th century. The Manasollasa details souring milk and draining the curds to make chhena and using them as a base for sweets. The text goes on to stipulate mixing the cheese with rice flour and shaping it into various balls, and then deep-frying to make sweets. Based on texts such as Charaka Samhita, BN Mathur wrote that the earliest evidence of a heat-acid coagulated milk product in India can be traced to 75–300 CE. Sunil Kumar et al. interpret this product as the present-day paneer or chhena.

According to another theory, the Portuguese may have introduced the technique of "breaking" milk with acid to Bengal in the 17th century. Before their arrival in 1517, curdling cow's milk was considered taboo to the adherents of Hinduism in Bengal. Before the arrival of the Portuguese in Bengal, sweets were made with khoa, or condensed milk which was solidified. Bengalis learnt how to prepare cheese for the Portuguese, which inspired chhena. Thus, according to this theory, Indian acid-set cheeses such as paneer and chhena were first prepared in Bengal, under Portuguese influence. A type of smoked cheese called Bandel Cheese was introduced by the Portuguese in Bengal, which is distinct from chenna and paneer.

Chhena cheese-based sweets were created by confectionery makers known as 'moira'/'moyra' in Bengal. The Halwai caste has long been associated with the production of chhena-based products. It is traditional for Bengalis to end a meal with a sweet, which is known as 'madhurena samapayet'. Today, some traditional sweet makers such as Annapurna Bhandar in New Delhi continue to make fresh chhena in their stores as a base for their products with locally sourced milk.

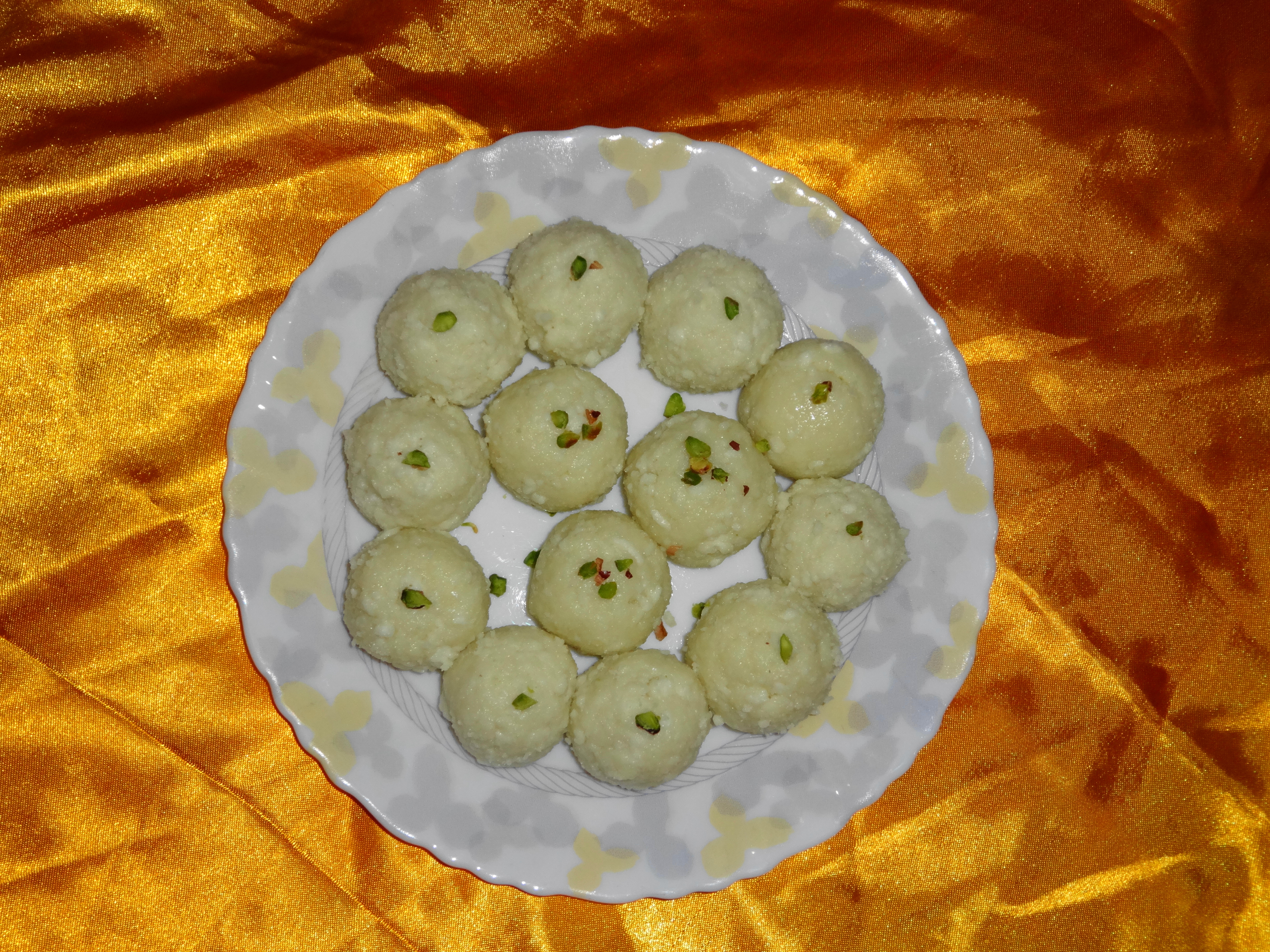
Sandesh, the most popular chhena-based sweet

In the 1990s, chhena was largely produced in country milk sheds by farmers and sent by road and rail to manufacturers. Batch methods of production are utilised by smaller producers, with their methods and resulting products having different characteristics and flavours compared to commercially produced products. The most popular product produced with chhena is sandesh, a dessert. In recent times, chhena products have become a niche, competing with introduced foreign foods and desserts.

Liberalisation, globalisation and privatisation are actively reshaping the Indian cheese industry. Traditional producers of chhena-based products are under pressure from foreign countries such as the United States of America seeking bilateral trade deals with the Indian government, especially as European-style cheeses such as mozzarella become more popular. Producers argue that they would not be able to compete with international dairy firms as they would have to comply with stricter sanitary and quarantine standards, which would vastly inflate costs of production. Dairy farmers in India are fiercely opposed to liberalisation of the dairy sector, as they fear job losses and the collapse of small industry which still produces traditional dairy products like chhena.

== Production ==
India's yearly production of chhena is estimated to be 200,000 tonnes as of 2004. Traditionally, chhena is made in a karahi, utilising a method similar to ricotta cheese production. The Food Safety and Standards Regulation of India states that chhena is to be made from cow or buffalo milk, or a blend of both milks, and the coagulation can be completed with 'sour milk, or lactic or citric acid'. Aged acidic whey from previous batches can also be substituted in the coagulation process to prevent waste of ingredients and streamline the production process.

The cheese is prepared by first boiling the chosen milk for 10 minutes, and then introducing an acid or aged acidic whey from a prior batch when the milk has slightly cooled at 75–80 degrees Celsius. Following this step, the whey separates and floats to the top of the pan. The whey is then removed by sieving the resulting curd, the chhena, through a muslin cloth. The pressing of the resulting curd mostly relies on gravity to separate it from the whey, but weighted boards can also be used to speed up the process. The longer the chhena is drained, the firmer the resulting final product becomes. Chhena is typically made in a small-scale batch process, but it is possible to make it with a continuous process like ricotta cheese in commercial production settings.

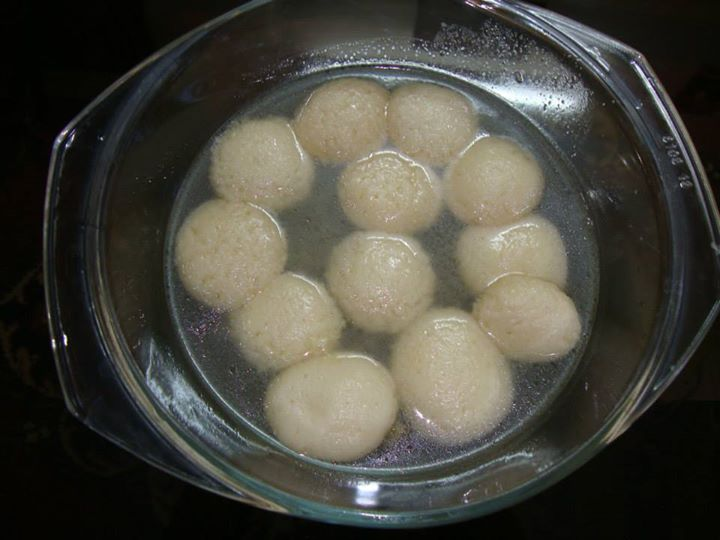
Homemade rosogolla, a famous chhena-based sweet

In the case of sweet production, the cheese is drained, kneaded on a wooden board and mixed with sugar and a binding agent such as arrowroot or semolina flour. It is common now for machines to be used for the kneading process. The chhena is then rolled into balls ready for use in confectionary making. Some of the popular sweets and desserts that use chhena as their base include rasogolla, sandesh, chum-chum, chhana murki, chhana podo, Ras malai, chhana balushahi, and khorma/belgrami. Chhena has also been blended with cream and made into a commercial refrigerated spreadable cheese. The chhena production process can be used to create a bioplastic which presents future innovation opportunities for the technology sector of India. However, this has raised ethical concerns domestically regarding food security for the wider population, as segments of the population struggle with rising food prices and malnutrition.

Nutritious beverages can be created from the whey that is typically discarded in the production process of chhena by fermenting it with bacteria cultures "Streptococcus thermophilus NCDC-74 and Yoghurt culture YC-470". Lactic bacteria can ferment lactose into lactic acid, which means that people with dairy intolerances would be able to consume the beverages. The whey can also be used to make puras, otherwise known as pancakes. The whey must be of high quality and handled hygienically, otherwise the created products may have undesirable qualities and become not suitable for consumption. Three million tonnes of whey is produced each year in the chhena production process and it is typically dumped into the environment, where it is a substantial problem as a pollutant as it has a high amount of organic matter in its mass.

== Character ==
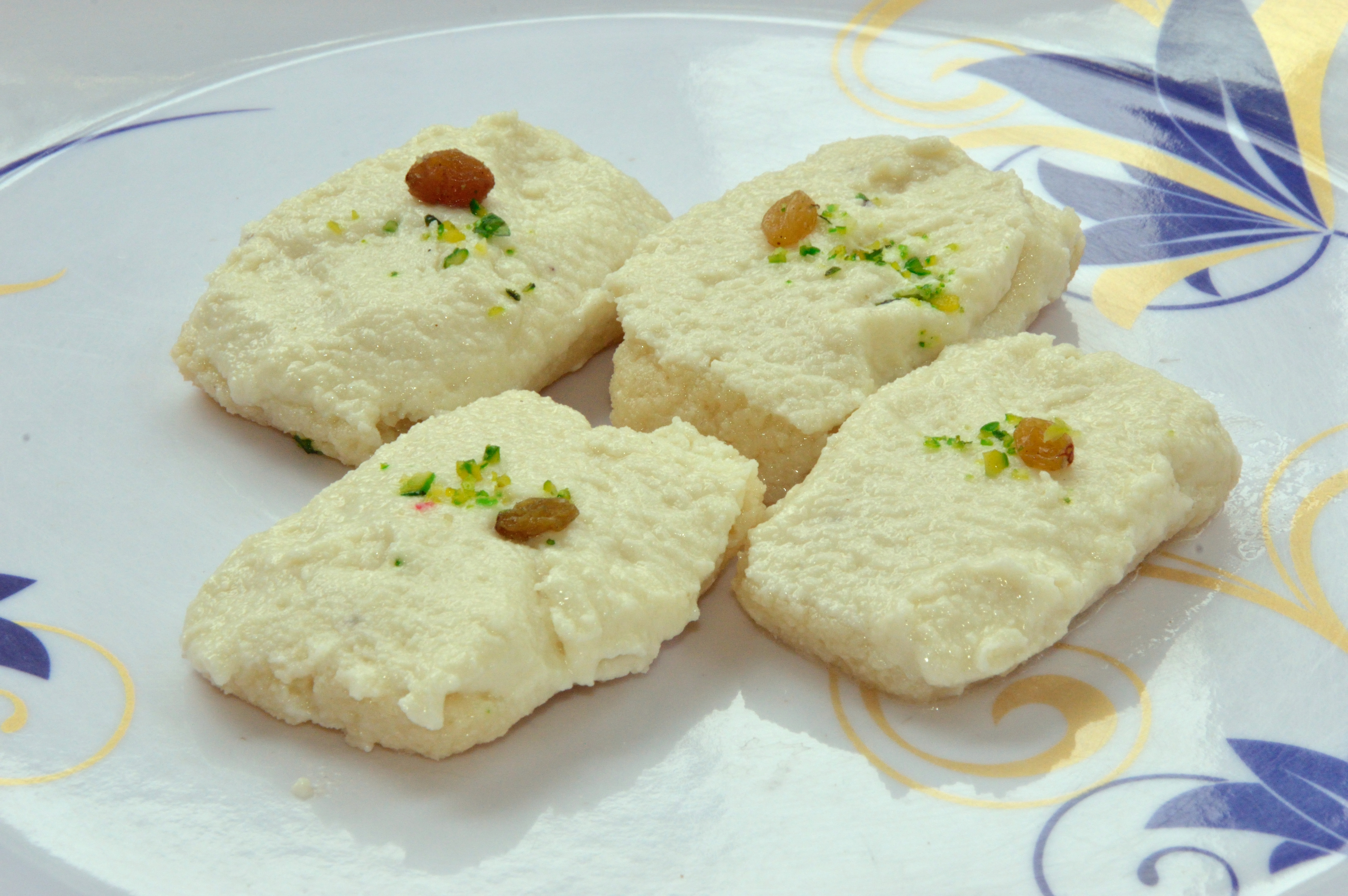
Chhena Toast, a popular savoury dish

The consistency of the finished cheese product has been shown to differ depending on the method utilised to create the cheese. Levels of milk fats under 4% create 'hard and rubbery' chhena, whilst levels over 5% result in greasy properties in the products created from it. Buffalo milk in the production process of chhena on average tends to create a larger amount of the cheese product compared to cow's milk. However, if it is not mixed with cow's milk the result is often 'hard, chewy, rubbery', with an 'uneven texture'. It is also possible to produce chhena with soy milk, with favourable results achieved in a blend with 75% cow's milk added. Milk composition and milking season also have a significant impact on the quality of the chhena produced.

Chhena typically has a texture like 'whipped cream cheese', and varies from smooth, pasty to crumbly. Chhena is composed of fat, protein, vitamins A and D, and is low in sugar. Chhena produced from cows milk is 'light yellow in colour, has a moist surface, soft body and smooth texture', while chhena produced from buffalo milk in comparison is 'whitish in colour'. Chhena made from these milk sources has a 'sweetish, mildly acidic taste'. Production in higher temperatures results in a cheese that is grainy and hard, while lower temperatures produce a product which is sticky, and dries slowly. Chhena typically is bland in taste and has an easily malleable texture. Experiments have been conducted to try to utilise chhena in the manufacturing of other products, including a spread consisting of finely processed chhena, butter and salt.

== Storage ==
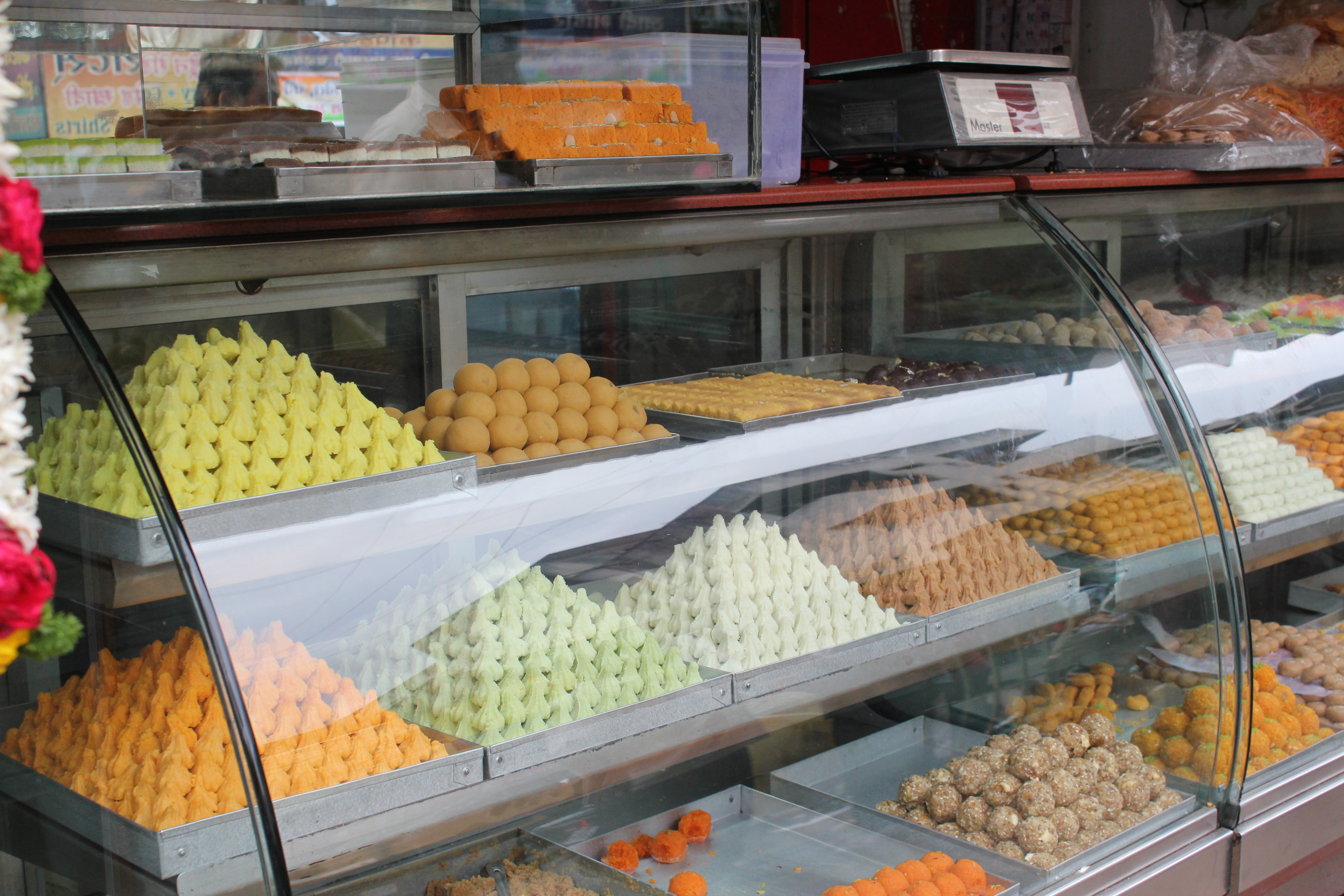
Counter of Dagdusheth Halwai, a popular sweets shop which sells chhena-based products.

Without adequate cold storage and safe handling, chhena spoils easily due to its high moisture content. Kulkarni states that 'thermoduric and thermophilic bacteria are not destroyed in the boiling process' in the manufacturing of chhena, which is a significant problem. The tropical climate and high humidity of India also contribute to the short shelf life of the products. Refrigeration makes a significant difference to the shelf life of the product, but it is quite uncommon and not readily available. Unsuccessful studies were carried out by Agrawal, Sandey, and Sinha in turning the chhena into powder to preserve it as a dried good and prolong its shelf life, as the reconstituted product was unsuitable for use.

Bladholm writes that chhena cheese-based sweets should be 'refrigerated and eaten within 2–3 days'. Quality control is a significant issue in India, but food inspectors do not have the power to prosecute those engaging in adulteration of products in the pursuit of increasing profits or selling base ingredients that are below accepted standards. Chhena can be adulterated with starch by dishonest manufacturers, which can result in diarrhoea and abdominal discomfort. Improper handling of chhena, and the products that it has been made from, have been proven to also contaminate products made from it. A study by Maity, Jumar and Misra (2011) found the presence of E. coli in 67% of chhena based sweet samples in Kolkata. E. coli in chhena-based products is resultant from 'unsanitary production, handling, storage and transportation', and is prominent in softer sweets as they have less sugar to preserve the cheese base and higher amounts of moisture. These products are often sold without packaging and are produced on a small scale.

== See also ==
- Khoa
- List of cheeses
