= Chhena kheeri =

Sweet dish originally from Odisha, India

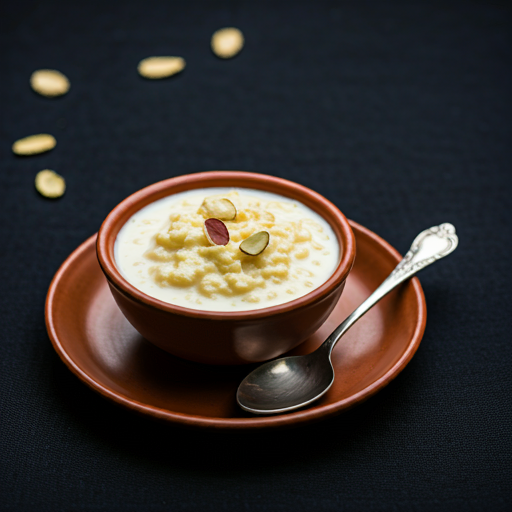
- Chhena kheeri
- Course: Dessert
- Place of origin: Odisha
- Region or state: Odisha, India
- Main ingredients: Clarified butter, ghee, sugar

Chhena kheeri (Odia: ଛେନା ଖିରୀ) is a sweet dish originally from coastal Odisha in eastern India.

== Preparation ==
Chhena kheeri is made by deep-frying cubes of chhena cheese. Although typically ghee is used as the frying medium, chefs frequently substitute this with vegetable oil. The cubes are added to milk and sugar, and boiled further until some of the milk evaporates and the dish acquires a thicker consistency, to form a rabdi. The mixture is seasoned with cardamom and nuts before being served.

== See also ==
- Chhena gaja
- Rasagolla
- Chhena poda
- Khira sagara
- Rasaballi
- Chhena jalebi
- Odia cuisine
