= Kendrapara district =

- District of Odisha
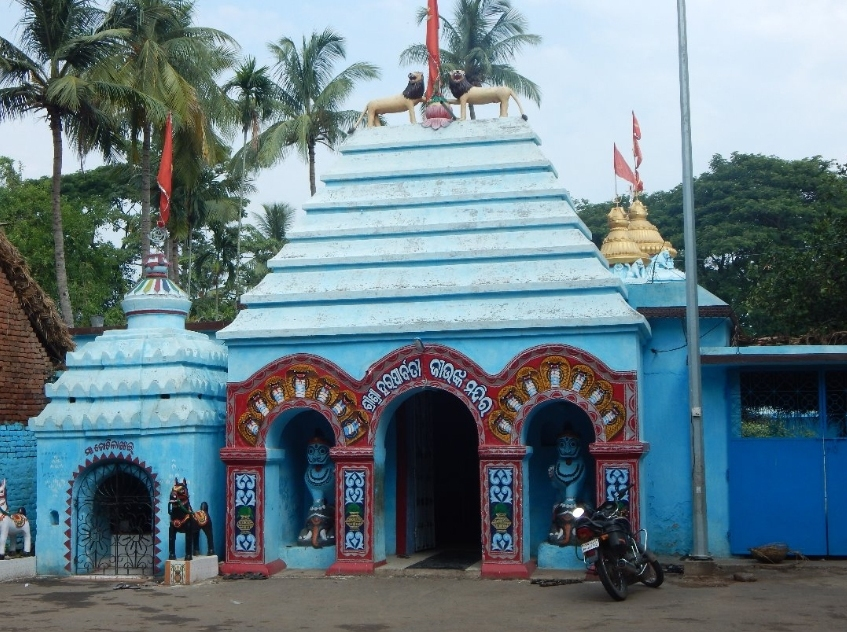
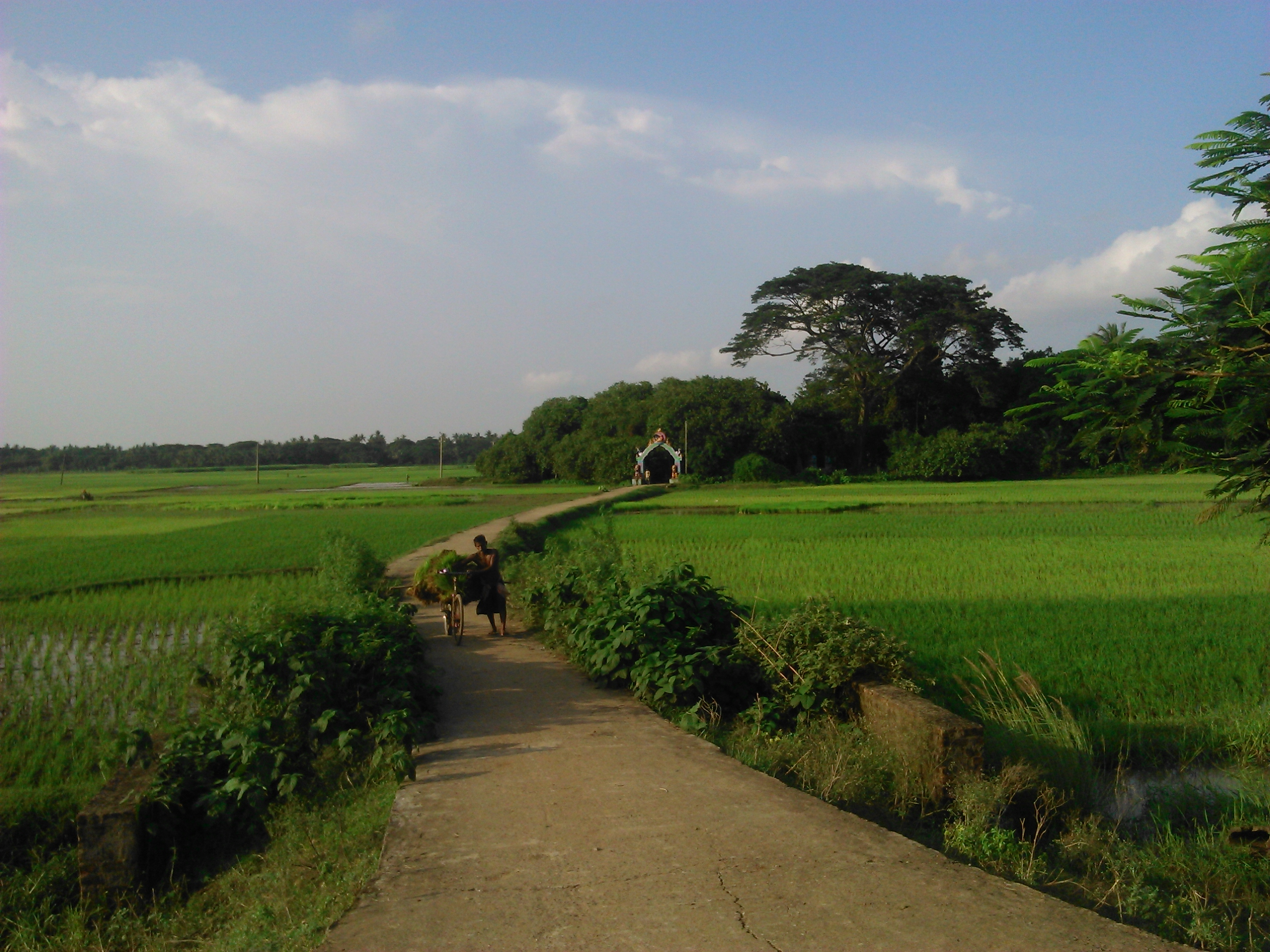
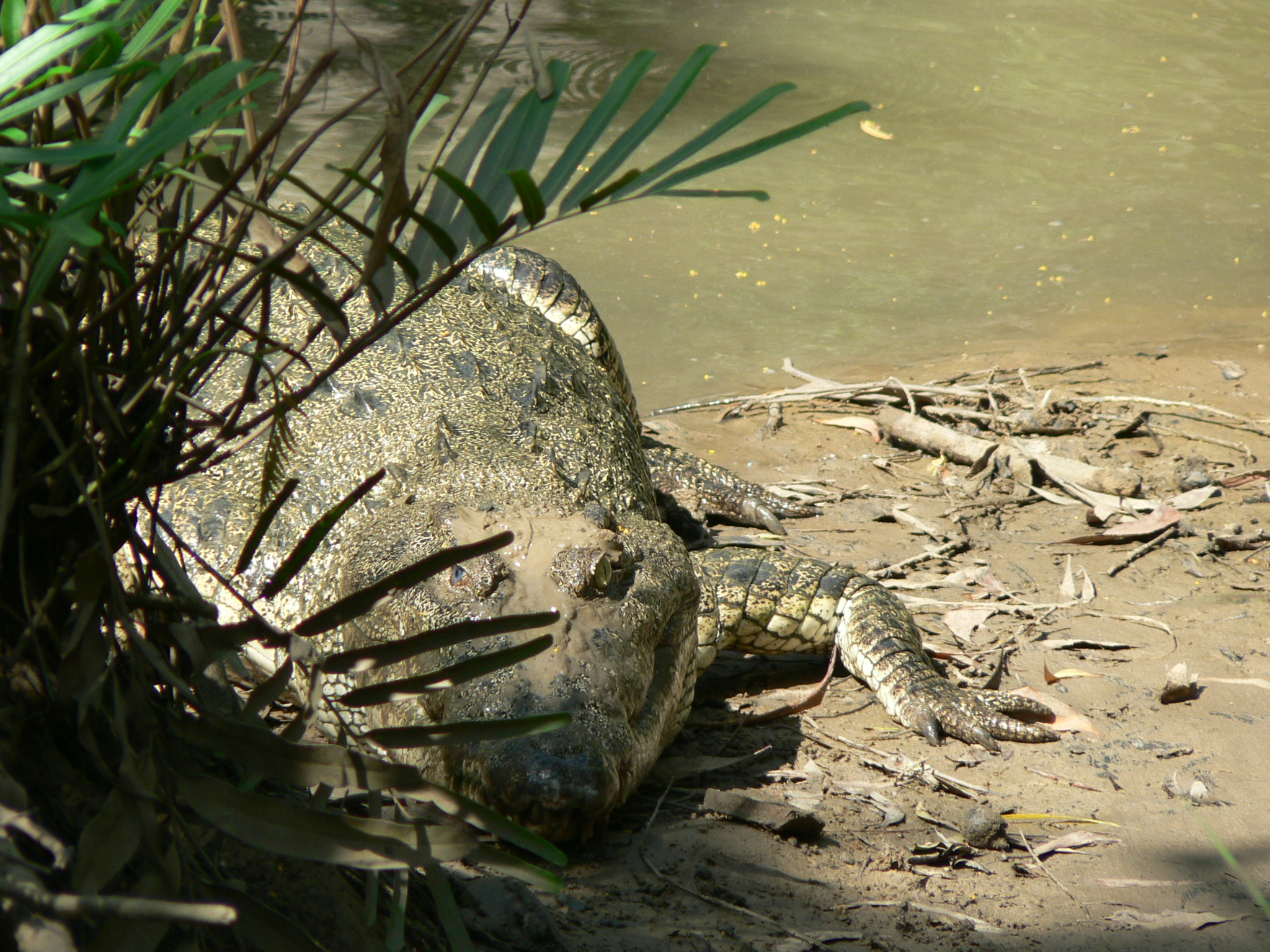
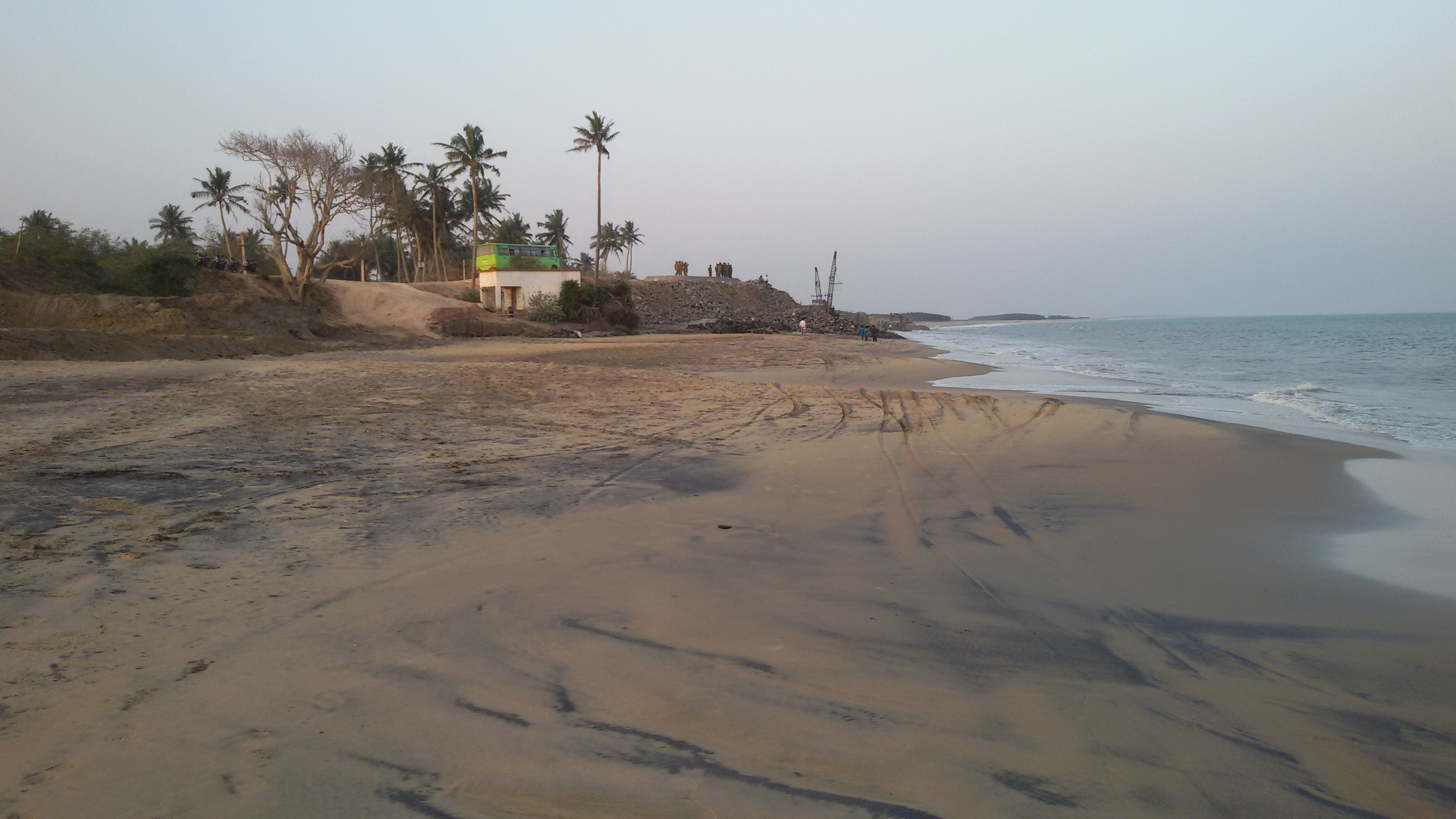
- Clockwise from top-left: Kanika Rajbari, Haparbati Temple in Pattamundai, Crocodile in Bhitarkanika Mangroves, Pentha Beach, Fields in Sakhibata

- Location in Odisha
- Coordinates: 20.525°N 86.475°E
- Country: India
- State: Odisha
- Headquarter: Kendrapara

Government
  - Collector & District Magistrate: Amrit Ruturaj IAS
  - Superintendent of Police: Jugal Kishore Banoth, IPS

Area
  - Total: 2,644 km^{2} (1,021 sq mi)

Population (2011)
  - Total: 1,440,361
  - Density: 492.38/km^{2} (1,275.3/sq mi)

Languages
  - Official: Odia, English
- Time zone: UTC+5:30 (IST)
- PIN: 754 xxx
- Vehicle registration: OD-29
- Sex ratio: 1.006 ♂/♀
- Literacy: 85.93%
- Lok Sabha constituency: Kendrapara
- Vidhan Sabha constituency: 5: 096-Patkura 097-Kendrapara(SC) 098-Aul 099-Rajanagar 100-Mahakalapada
- Climate: Aw (Köppen)
- Precipitation: 1,501.3 millimetres (59.11 in)
- Website: www.kendrapara.nic.in

Kendrapara district is an administrative district of Odisha state in eastern India. The town of Kendrapara is the district headquarters. Kendrapara District is situated in the eastern portion of the state, and is bounded on the north by Bhadrak district, on the east by the Bay of Bengal, on the south by Jagatsinghpur District, on the west by Cuttack District and on the northwest by Jajpur District.

== History ==
The formation of Kendrapara District took place on April 1, 1993, when a coastal area spanning 2,644 square kilometers was carved out from Cuttack district, with its own headquarter in Kendrapara town.

== Geography ==
Kendrapara District lies in 20° 20’ N To 20° 37’ N Latitude and 86° 14’ E To 87° 01’ E Longitude and situated in central coastal plain zone of the Odisha. The Bay of Bengal lies in the eastern part of the district. The coastline covers 48 km stretching from Dhamra Muhan to Batighar. Kendrapara district headquarters is 55 km from Cuttack.

Kendrapara District lies in the river delta formed by the Brahmani and Baitarani and branch rivers of the Mahanadi. The Bhitarkanika Mangroves, Bhitarkanika National Park, Gahirmatha Beach and Baladevjew Temple lie in the district. Other features in the district include Suka-Parikshita Ashram, Kudanagari, Landibata Mahapurusha Matha Chanpur, Pentha sea beach, PatharaKani Temple Gogua, Garteswar Mahadev Gosigan, Harihar Kshetra Mahala, Gadadhara Gosain Pitha, and Korua. This district has 9 blocks named as Aul, Derabish, Garadpur, Mahakalapada, Marshaghai, Kendrapara, Rajanagar, Rajkanika, Patamundai.

== Divisions ==
There are 9 Tahasils and 9 blocks in Kendrapara district. They are :

Tahasils

1. Aul
2. Kanika
3. Kendrapara
4. Marshaghai
5. Pattamundai
6. Rajnagar
7. Mahakalpada
8. Derabish
9. Garadpur

Blocks

1. Aul
2. Derabish
3. Garadpur
4. Kendrapara
5. Mahakalpada
6. Marshaghai
7. Pattamundai
8. Rajkanika
9. Rajnagar

== Demographics ==
Historical population
Year	Pop.	±%
1901	459,224	—
1911	470,355	+2.4%
1921	457,135	−2.8%
1931	486,625	+6.5%
1941	509,546	+4.7%
1951	526,472	+3.3%
1961	649,457	+23.4%
1971	823,451	+26.8%
1981	981,219	+19.2%
1991	1,149,501	+17.2%
2001	1,302,005	+13.3%
2011	1,440,361	+10.6%
Source: Census of India

Religions in Kendrapara district (2011)
Religion	Percent
Hinduism	96.28%
Islam	3.49%
Other or not stated	0.23%

According to the 2011 census Kendrapara district has a population of 1,440,361, roughly equal to the nation of Eswatini or the US state of Hawaii. This gives it a ranking of 344th in India (out of a total of 640). The district has a population density of 545 inhabitants per square kilometre (1,410/sq mi). Its population growth rate over the decade 2001–2011 was 10.59%. Kendrapara has a sex ratio of 1006 females for every 1000 males, and a literacy rate of 85.93%. 5.80% of the population lives in urban areas. Scheduled Castes and Scheduled Tribes make up 21.51% and 0.66% of the population respectively.

Languages of Kendrapara district (2011)
1. Odia (91.5%)
2. Bengali (4.76%)
3. Urdu (3.31%)
4. Others (0.46%)

At the time of the 2011 Census of India, 91.47% of the population in the district spoke Odia, 4.76% Bengali and 3.31% Urdu as their first language.

== Politics ==
=== Vidhan sabha constituencies ===
The following is the 5 Vidhan sabha constituencies of Kendrapara district and the elected members of that area

No.	Constituency	Reservation	Extent of the Assembly Constituency (Blocks)	Member of 14th Assembly	Party
96	Patkura	None	Derabish, Garadapur, Marshaghai (part)	Arvind Mohapatra	BJD
97	Kendrapara	SC	Kendrapara (M), Kendrapara, Pattamundai (part)	Ganeswar Behera	BJD
98	Aul	None	Aul, Rajkanika	Pratap Keshari Deb	BJD
99	Rajanagar	None	Pattamundai (NAC), Rajanagar, Pattamundai (part)	Dhruba Charan Sahoo	BJD
100	Mahakalapada	None	Mahakalapada, Marshaghai (part)	Durga Prasan Nayak	BJP
