= Chhena jalebi =

Indian dessert

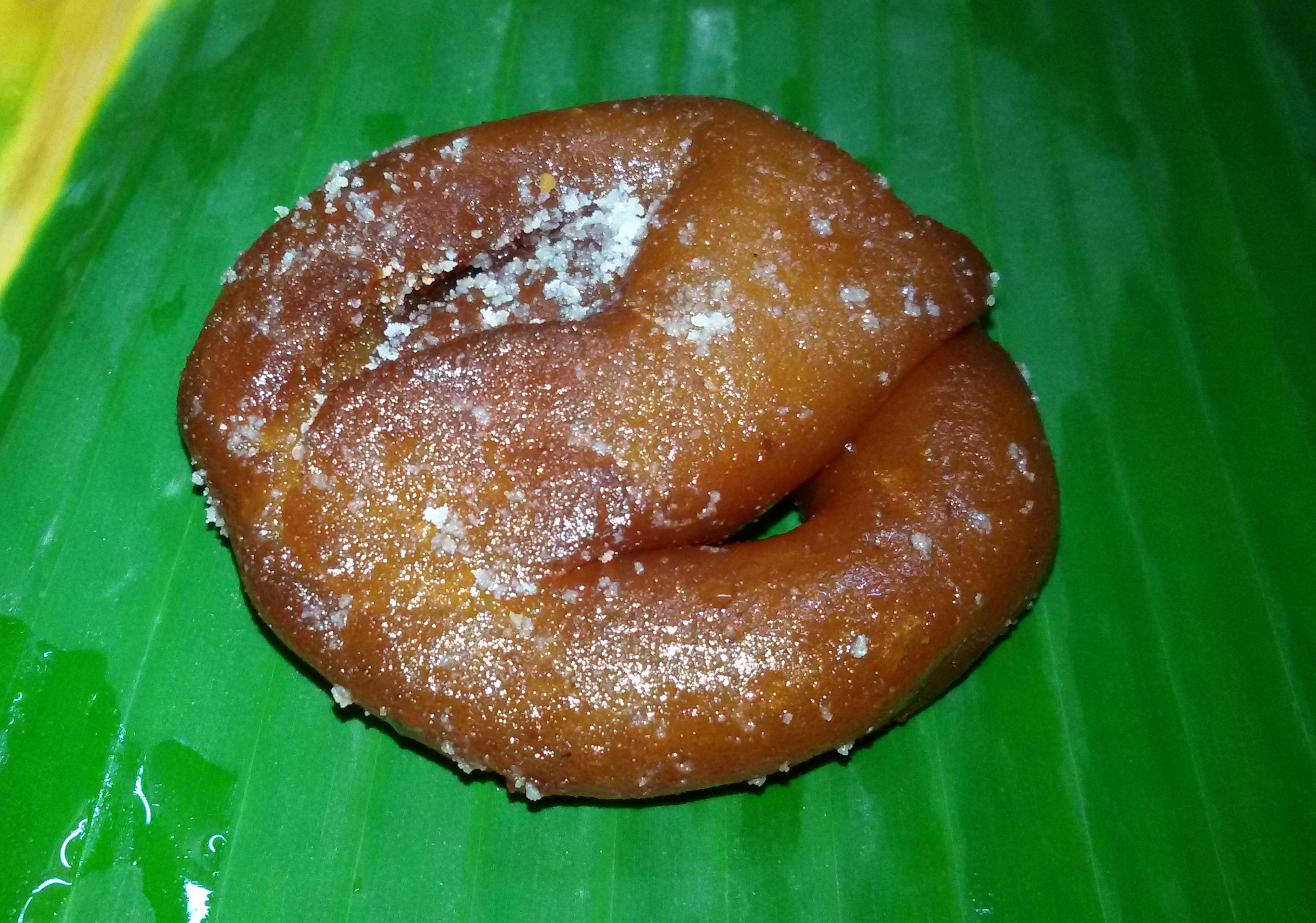
- Chhena jilapi
- Alternative names: Chhena jhilapi
- Course: Dessert
- Place of origin: India
- Region or state: Odisha
- Associated cuisine: India
- Main ingredients: Cottage cheese or chhena, sugar
- Similar dishes: Jalebi, imarti, shahi jilapi

Chhena jalebi or chhena jilapi(ଛେନା ଜିଲାପି)is a sweet dish originally from the eastern state of Odisha in the Indian subcontinent. It is a dessert made from chhena. It is popular in Odisha, West Bengal, Bangladesh and other eastern regions of the Indian subcontinent.

== Preparation ==
Chhena jilapi are made in a manner very similar to regular jalebis which are popular throughout India. However, the basic ingredient is fresh curd cheese called chhenna. Fresh chhena is thoroughly kneaded and rolled up into shapes similar to pretzels, before being deep fried. The fully fried chhena pretzels are then soaked in a sugary syrup. Chhena jilapis are served either hot or chilled.

== See also ==
- Khira sagara
- Oriya cuisine
- Bangladeshi cuisine
