= Dairy =

Place where milk is stored and where butter, cheese and yoghurt are made or sold

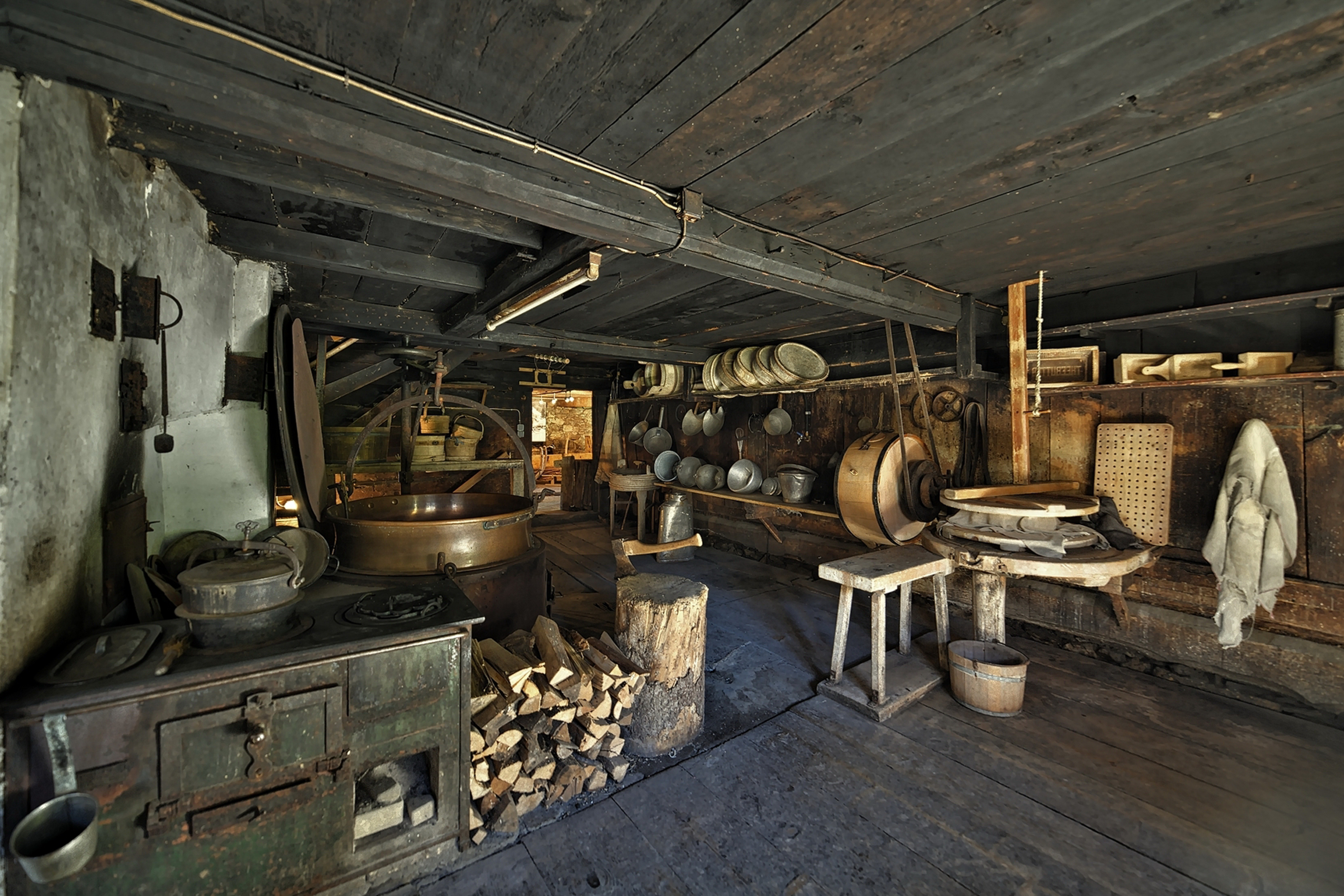
Old mountain pasture dairy in Schröcken, Vorarlberg, Austria, in the Bregenz Forest

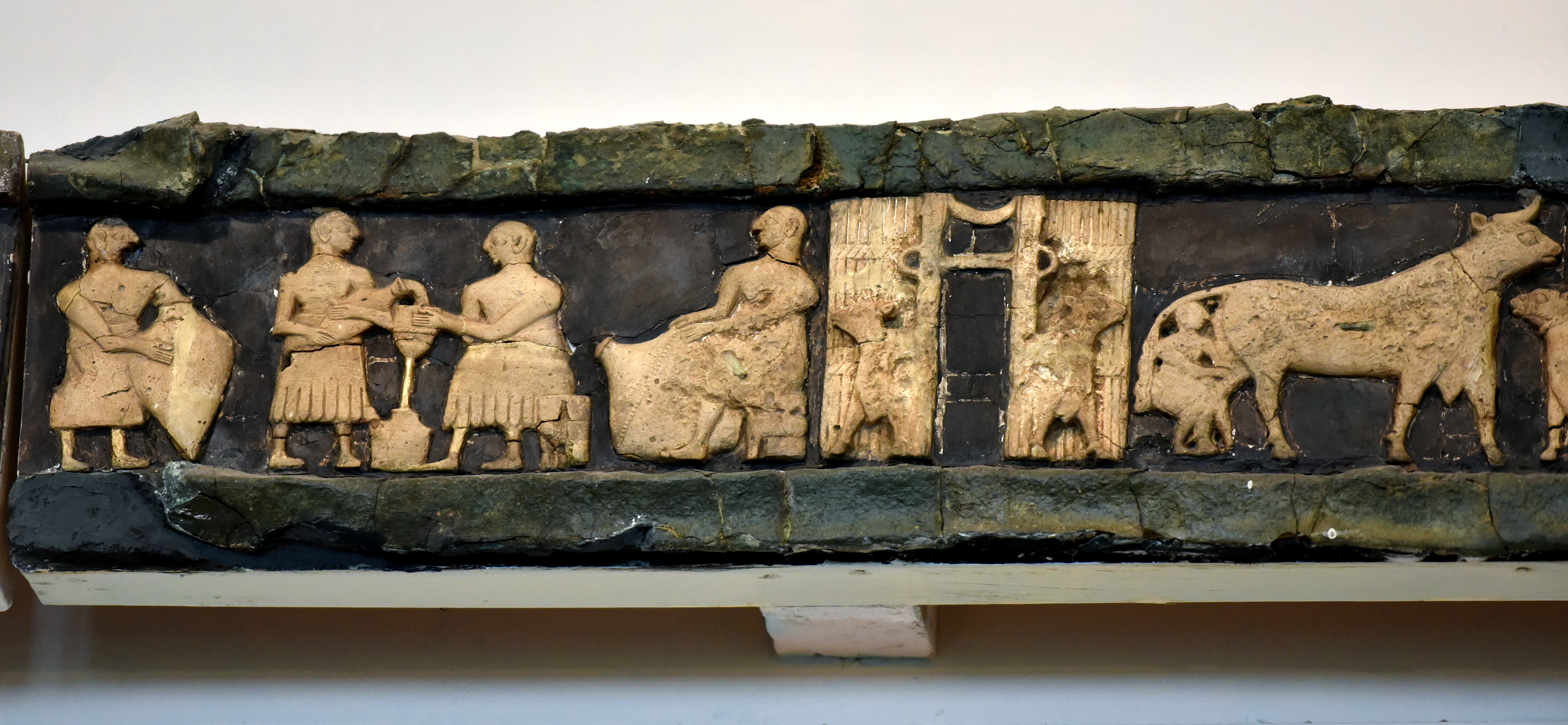
"Frieze of the Dairy" showing the façade of the temple of the goddess Ninhursag at Tell al-Ubaid, 2800-2600 BCE, depicting the production of cow dairy products in the stables of the complex, with aman milking on the right and, on the left, men decanting and churning in large containers to obtain cream, butter and cheese, Sumerian Gallery of the Iraq Museum

A dairy is a place where milk is stored and where butter, cheese, and other dairy products are made, or a place where those products are sold. It may be a room, a building, or a larger establishment. In the United States, the word may also describe a dairy farm or the part of a mixed farm dedicated to milk for human consumption, whether from cows, buffaloes, goats, yaks, sheep, horses or camels.

The attributive dairy describes milk-based products, derivatives, and processes, and the animals and workers involved in their production, for example dairyman, dairymaid, dairy cattle or dairy goat. A dairy farm produces milk and a dairy factory processes it into a variety of dairy products. These establishments constitute the global dairy industry, part of the food industry.

The word dairy comes from an Old English word for female servant, as milking was historically done by dairymaids.

== Terminology ==
Terminology differs between countries. In the United States, for example, an entire dairy farm is commonly called a "dairy". The building or farm area where milk is harvested from the cow is often called a "milking parlor" or "parlor", except in the case of smaller dairies, where cows are often put on pasture, and usually milked in "stanchion barns". The farm area where milk is stored in bulk tanks is known as the farm's "milk house". Milk is then hauled (usually by truck) to a "dairy plant", also referred to as a "dairy", where raw milk is further processed and prepared for commercial sale of dairy products.

In New Zealand, the building used for milk harvesting is commonly called a "milking shed". As in the United States, milking sheds are sometimes referred to by their type, such as "herring bone shed" or "pit parlour". Parlour design has evolved from simple barns or sheds to large rotary structures in which the workflow (throughput of cows) is very efficiently handled. In some countries, especially those with small numbers of animals being milked, the farm may perform the functions of a dairy plant, processing their own milk into saleable dairy products, such as butter, cheese, or yogurt. This on-site processing is a traditional method of producing specialist milk products, common in Europe.

In the United States a dairy can also be a place that processes, distributes and sells dairy products, or a room, building or establishment where milk is stored and processed into milk products, such as butter or cheese. In New Zealand English the singular use of the word dairy almost exclusively refers to a corner shop, or superette. This usage is historical as such shops were a common place for the public to buy milk products.

== History ==
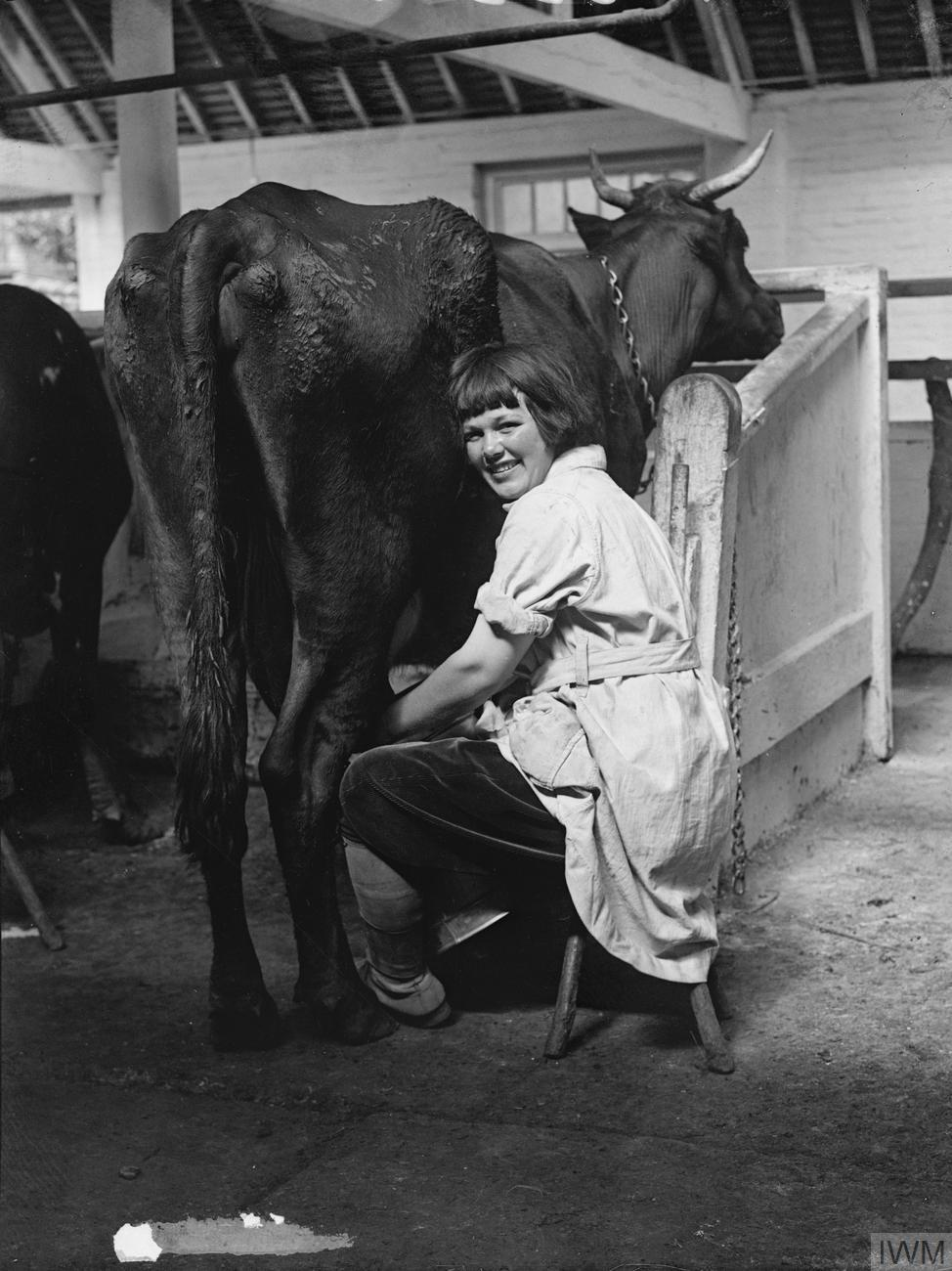
A member of the Women's Land Army milking a cow during World War I

Milk producing animals have been domesticated for thousands of years. Initially, they were part of the subsistence farming that nomads engaged in. As the community moved about the country, their animals accompanied them. Protecting and feeding the animals were a major part of the symbiotic relationship between the animals and the herders.

In the more recent past, people in agricultural societies owned dairy animals that they milked for domestic and local (village) consumption, a typical example of a cottage industry. The animals might serve multiple purposes (for example, as a draught animal for pulling a plow as a youngster, and at the end of its useful life as meat). In this case, the animals were normally milked by hand and the herd size was quite small, so that all of the animals could be milked in less than an hour—about 10 per milker. These tasks were performed by a dairymaid (dairywoman) or dairyman. The word dairy harkens back to Middle English dayerie, deyerie, from deye (female servant or dairymaid) and further back to Old English dæge (kneader of bread).

With industrialisation and urbanisation, the supply of milk became a commercial industry, with specialised breeds of cattle being developed for dairy, as distinct from beef or draught animals. Initially, more people were employed as milkers, but it soon turned to mechanisation with machines designed to do the milking.

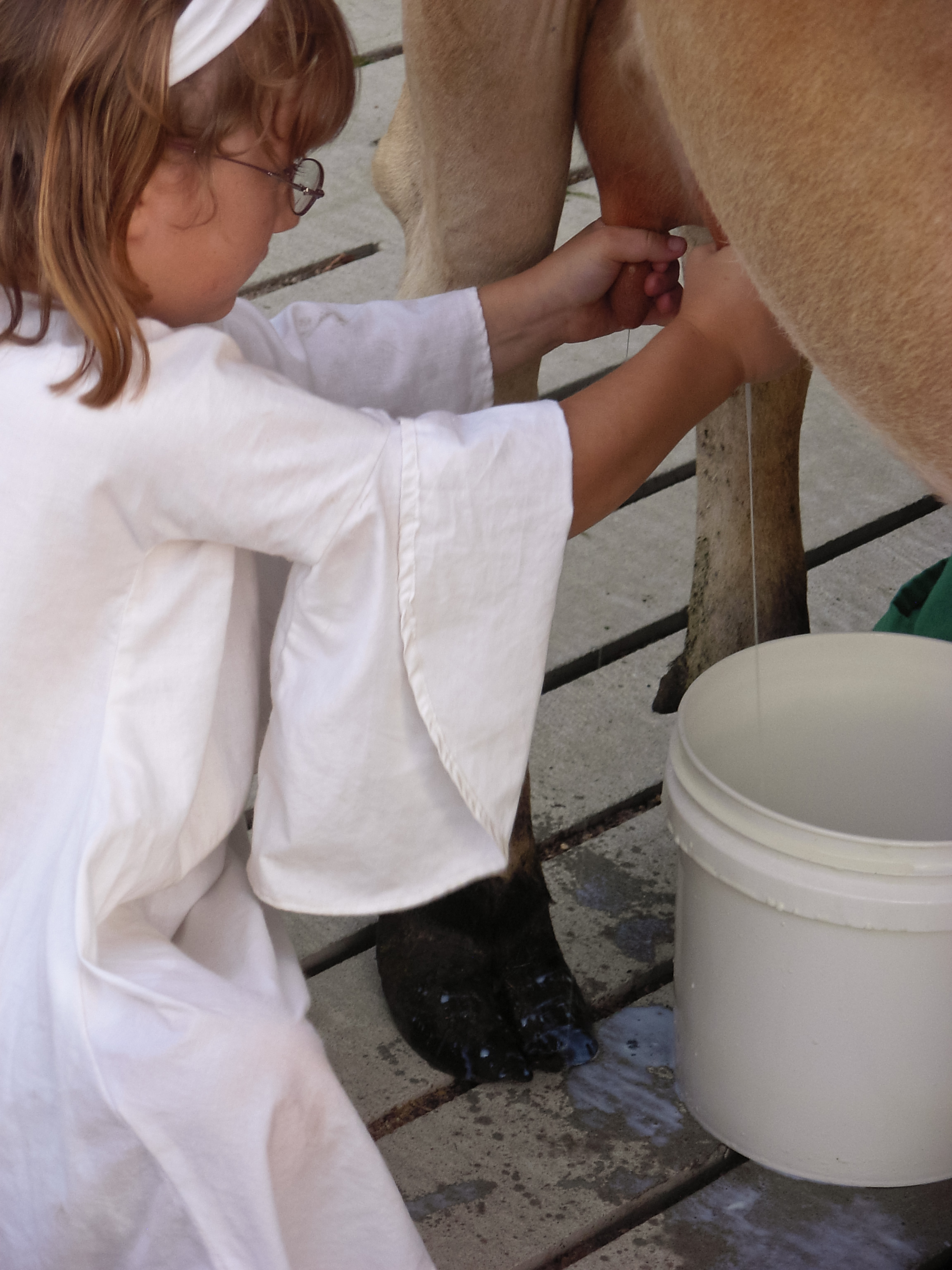
Girl milking a cow by hand

Historically, the milking and the processing took place close together in space and time: on a dairy farm. People milked the animals by hand; on farms where only small numbers are kept, hand-milking may still be practised. Hand-milking is accomplished by grasping the teats (often pronounced tit or tits) in the hand and expressing milk either by squeezing the fingers progressively, from the udder end to the tip, or by squeezing the teat between thumb and index finger, then moving the hand downward from udder towards the end of the teat. The action of the hand or fingers is designed to close off the milk duct at the udder (upper) end and, by the movement of the fingers, close the duct progressively to the tip to express the trapped milk. Each half or quarter of the udder is emptied one milk-duct capacity at a time.

The stripping action is repeated, using both hands for speed. Both methods result in the milk that was trapped in the milk duct being squirted out the end into a bucket that is supported between the knees (or rests on the ground) of the milker, who usually sits on a low stool.

Traditionally the cow, or cows, would stand in the field or paddock while being milked. Young stock, heifers, would have to be trained to remain still to be milked. In many countries, the cows were tethered to a post and milked.

== Structure of the industry ==
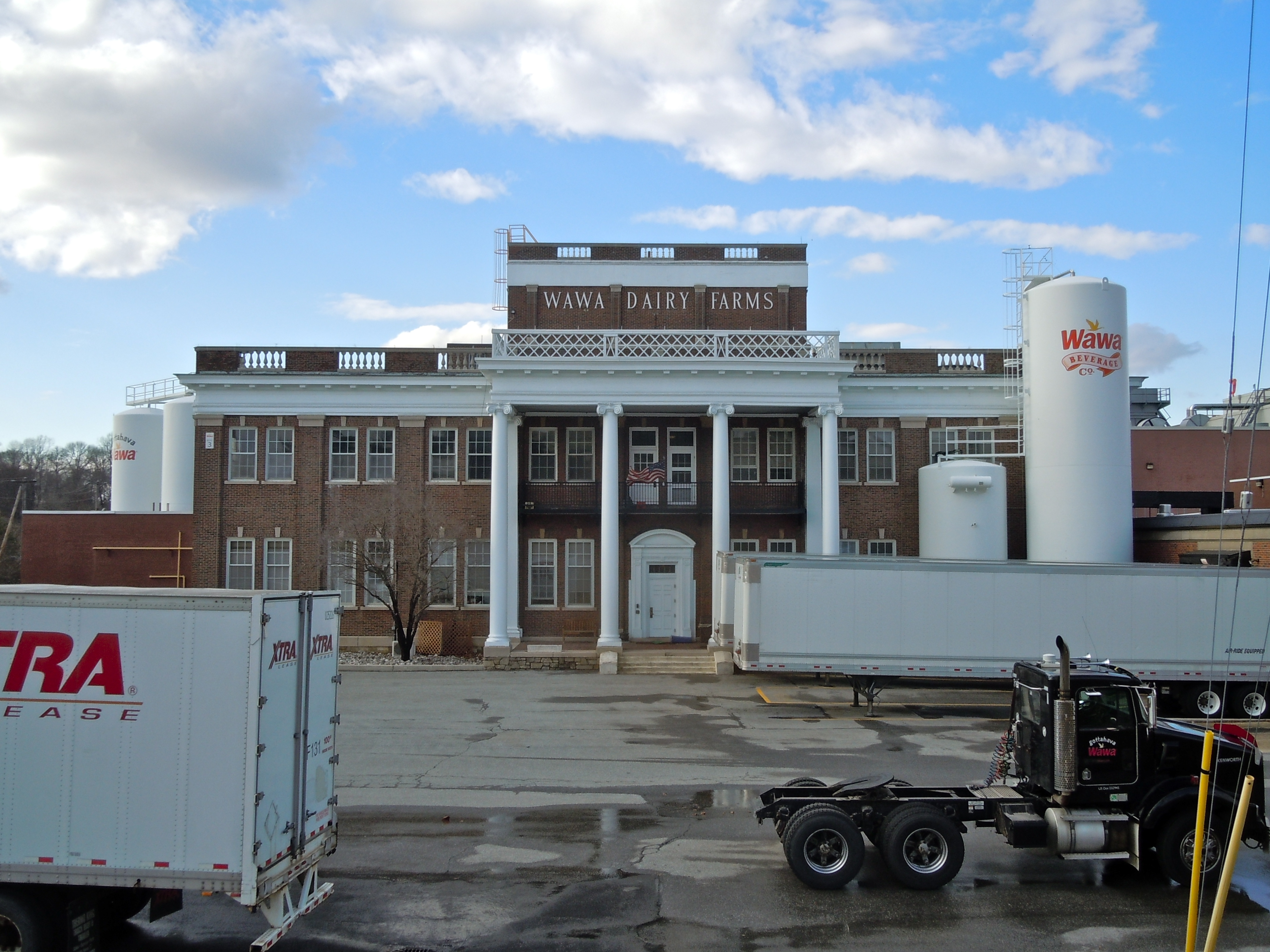
Wawa Dairy Farms in Pennsylvania

While most countries produce their own milk products, the structure of the dairy industry varies in different parts of the world. In major milk-producing countries most milk is distributed through whole sale markets. In Ireland and Australia, for example, farmers' co-operatives own many of the large-scale processors, while in the United States many farmers and processors do business through individual contracts. In the United States, the country's 196 farmers' cooperatives sold 86% of milk in the U.S. in 2002, with five cooperatives accounting for half that. This was down from 2,300 cooperatives in the 1940s. In developing countries, the past practice of farmers marketing milk in their own neighbourhoods is changing rapidly. Notable developments include considerable foreign investment in the dairy industry and a growing role for dairy cooperatives. Output of milk is growing rapidly in such countries and presents a major source of income growth for many farmers.

As in many other branches of the food industry, dairy processing in the major dairy producing countries has become increasingly concentrated, with fewer but larger and more efficient plants operated by fewer workers. This is notably the case in the United States, Europe, Australia and New Zealand. In 2009, charges of antitrust violations have been made against major dairy industry players in the United States, which critics call "Big Milk". Another round of price fixing charges was settled in 2016.

Government intervention in milk markets was common in the 20th century. A limited antitrust exemption was created for U.S. dairy cooperatives by the Capper–Volstead Act of 1922. In the 1930s, some U.S. states adopted price controls, and Federal Milk Marketing Orders started under the Agricultural Marketing Agreement Act of 1937 and continue in the 2000s. The Federal Milk Price Support Program began in 1949. The Northeast Dairy Compact regulated wholesale milk prices in New England from 1997 to 2001.

Plants producing liquid milk and products with short shelf life, such as yogurts, creams and soft cheeses, tend to be located on the outskirts of urban centres close to consumer markets. Plants manufacturing items with longer shelf life, such as butter, milk powders, cheese and whey powders, tend to be situated in rural areas closer to the milk supply. Most large processing plants tend to specialise in a limited range of products. Exceptionally, however, large plants producing a wide range of products are still common in Eastern Europe, a holdover from the former centralised, supply-driven concept of the market under Communist governments.

As processing plants grow fewer and larger, they tend to acquire bigger, more automated and more efficient equipment. While this technological tendency keeps manufacturing costs lower, the need for long-distance transportation often increases the environmental impact.

Milk production is irregular, depending on cow biology. Producers must adjust the mix of milk which is sold in liquid form vs. processed foods (such as butter and cheese) depending on changing supply and demand.

=== Milk supply contracts ===
In the European Union, milk supply contracts are regulated by Article 148 of Regulation 1308/2013 – Establishing a common organisation of the markets in agricultural products and repealing Council Regulations (EEC) No 922/72, (EEC) No 234/79, (EC) No 1037/2001 and (EC) No 1234/2007, which permits member states to create a requirement for the supply of milk from a farmer to a raw milk processor to be backed by a written contract, or to ensure that the first purchaser of milk to make a written offer to the farmer, although in this case the farmer may not be required to enter into a contract. Thirteen EU member states including France and Spain have introduced laws on compulsory or mandatory written milk contracts (MWC's) between farmers and processors.

In the UK, a voluntary code of best practice on contractual relationships in the dairy sector was agreed by industry during 2012: this set out minimum standards of good practice for contracts between producers and purchasers. The Scottish Government published an analysis of the dairy supply chain and the application of mandatory written contracts across the European Union in 2019, to evaluate the impact of the contracts where they have been adopted. During 2020 the UK government undertook a consultation exercise to determine which contractual measures, if any, would improve the resilience of the dairy industry for the future. Contracts for the delivery of raw milk are now negotiated by groups of farmers, who operate together as recognised Dairy Producer Organisations (DPOs) to agree terms with milk processors on behalf of their members. A recognised DPO must be an independent legal entity (or part of one) and include "at least 10 dairy producers (all of them must be separate legal entities) or produce 6 million litres a year (2 producers needed), or both".

The Australian government has also introduced a mandatory dairy code of conduct.

== Farming ==
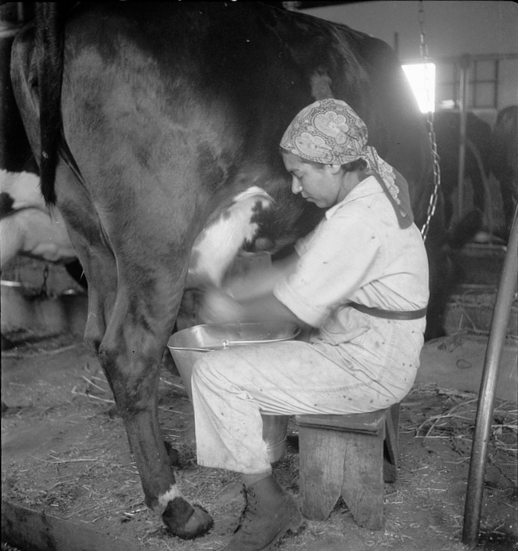
A cow being milked in Mandatory Palestine, 1936

When it became necessary to milk larger cows, the cows would be brought to a shed or barn that was set up with stalls (milking stalls) where the cows could be confined their whole life while they were milked. One person could milk more cows this way, as many as 20 for a skilled worker. But having cows standing about in the yard and shed waiting to be milked is not good for the cow, as she needs as much time in the paddock grazing as is possible. It is usual to restrict the twice-daily milking to a maximum of an hour and a half each time. It makes no difference whether one milks 10 or 1000 cows, the milking time should not exceed a total of about three hours each day for any cow as they should be in stalls and laying down as long as possible to increase comfort which will in turn aid in milk production. A cow is physically milked for only about 10 minutes a day depending on her milk letdown time and the number of milkings per day.

As herd sizes increased there was more need to have efficient milking machines, sheds, milk-storage facilities (vats), bulk-milk transport and shed cleaning capabilities and the means of getting cows from paddock to shed and back.

As herd numbers increased so did the problems of animal health. In New Zealand two approaches to this problem have been used. The first was improved veterinary medicines (and the government regulation of the medicines) that the farmer could use. The other was the creation of veterinary clubs where groups of farmers would employ a veterinarian (vet) full-time and share those services throughout the year. It was in the vet's interest to keep the animals healthy and reduce the number of calls from farmers, rather than to ensure that the farmer needed to call for service and pay regularly.

This daily milking routine goes on for about 300 to 320 days per year that the cow stays in milk. Some small herds are milked once a day for about the last 20 days of the production cycle but this is not usual for large herds. If a cow is left unmilked just once she is likely to reduce milk-production almost immediately and the rest of the season may see her dried off (giving no milk) and still consuming feed. However, once-a-day milking is now being practised more widely in New Zealand for profit and lifestyle reasons. This is effective because the fall in milk yield is at least partially offset by labour and cost savings from milking once per day. This compares to some intensive farm systems in the United States that milk three or more times per day due to higher milk yields per cow and lower marginal labour costs.

Farmers who are contracted to supply liquid milk for human consumption (as opposed to milk for processing into butter, cheese, and so on—see milk) often have to manage their herd so that the contracted number of cows are in milk the year round, or the required minimum milk output is maintained. This is done by mating cows outside their natural mating time so that the period when each cow in the herd is giving maximum production is in rotation throughout the year.

Northern hemisphere farmers who keep cows in barns almost all the year usually manage their herds to give continuous production of milk so that they get paid all year round. In the southern hemisphere the cooperative dairying systems allow for two months of no productivity because their systems are designed to take advantage of maximum grass and milk production in the spring and because the milk processing plants pay bonuses in the dry (winter) season to carry the farmers through the mid-winter break from milking. It also means that cows have a rest from milk production when they are most heavily pregnant. Some year-round milk farms are penalised financially for overproduction at any time in the year by being unable to sell their overproduction at current prices.

Artificial insemination (AI) is common in all high-production herds in order to improve the genetics of the female offspring which will be raised for replacements. AI also reduces the need for keeping potentially dangerous bulls on the farm. Male calves are sold to be raised for beef or veal, or slaughtered due to lack of profitability. A cow will calve or freshen about once a year, until she is culled because of declining production, infertility or other health problems. Then the cow will be sold, most often going to slaughter.

== Industrial processing ==
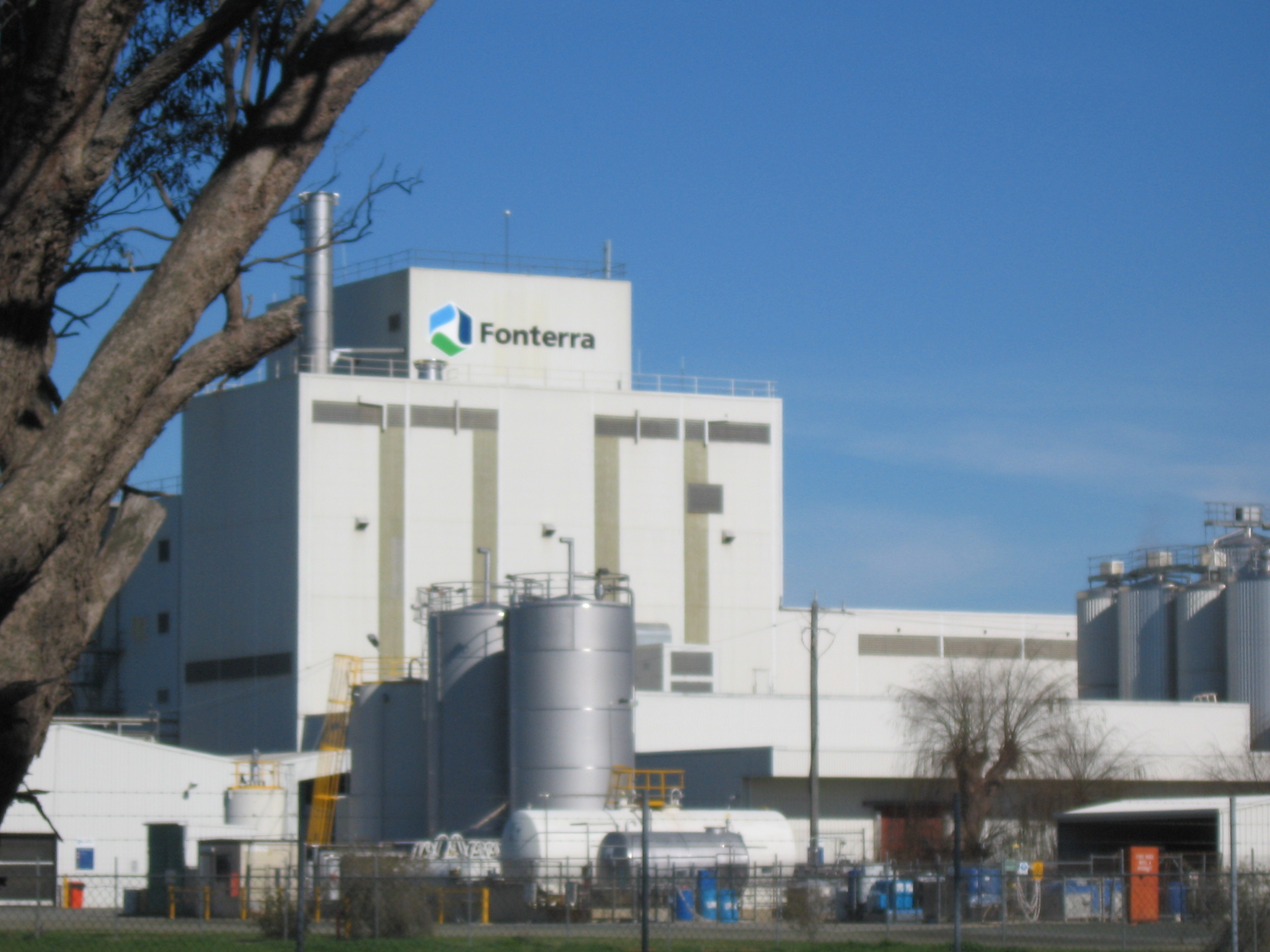
A Fonterra cooperative dairy factory in Australia

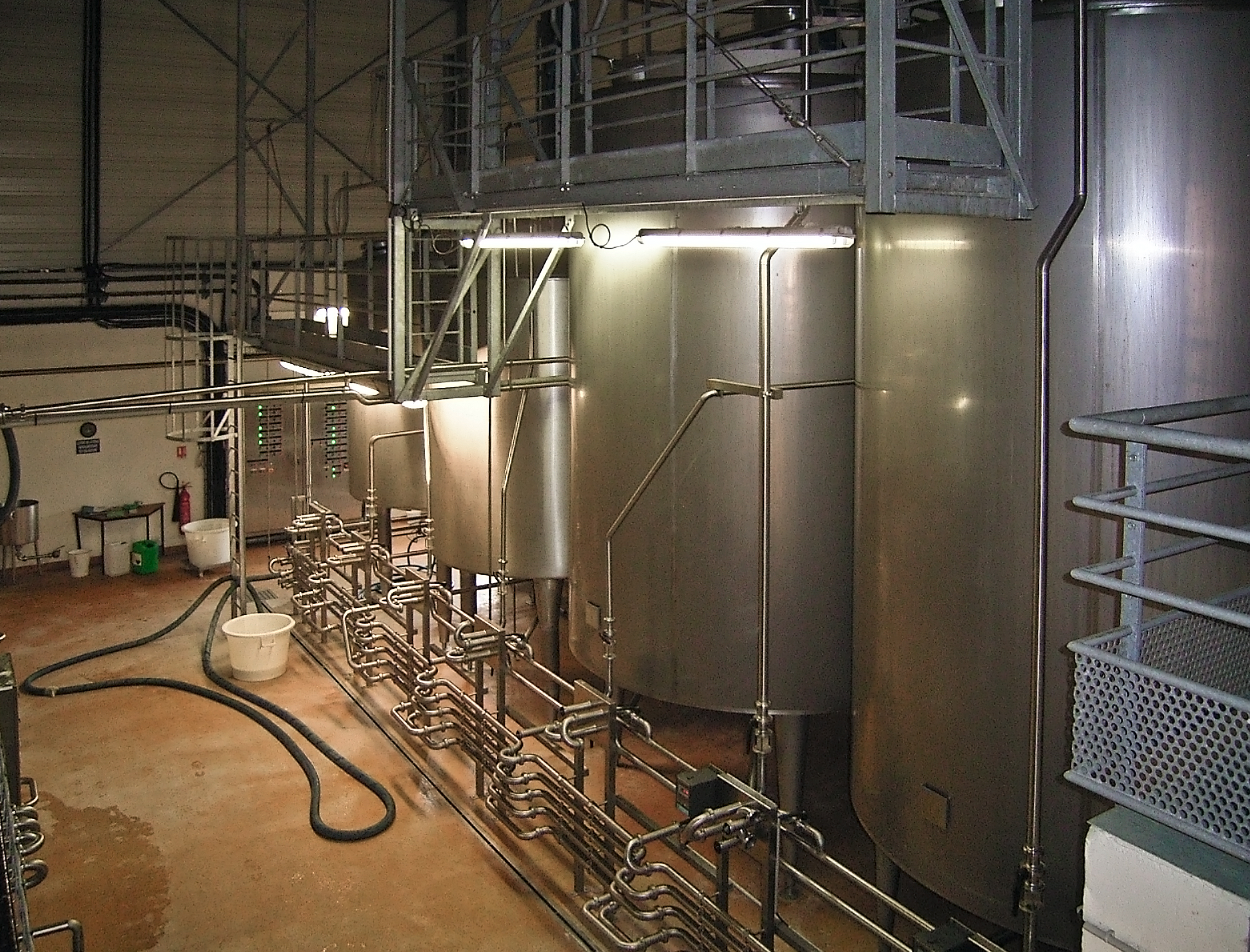
Interior of a cheese factory in Seine-et-Marne, France

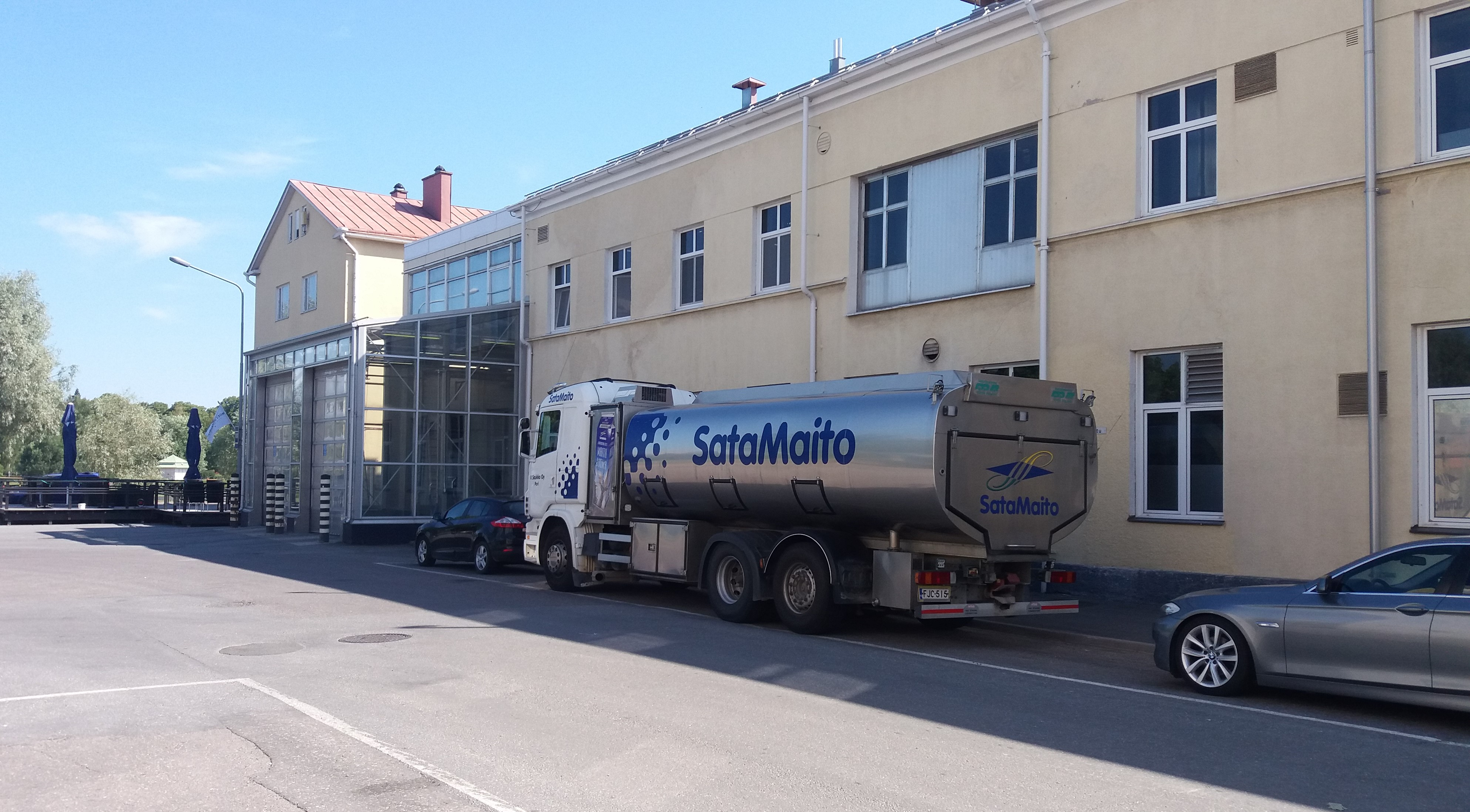
A tank truck parked in front of the Satamaito dairy in Pori, Finland

Dairy plants process the raw milk they receive from farmers so as to extend its marketable life. Two main types of processes are employed: heat treatment to ensure the safety of milk for human consumption and to lengthen its shelf-life, and dehydrating dairy products such as butter, hard cheese and milk powders so that they can be stored.

=== Cream and butter ===
Milk is separated by industrial separators in bulk into cream and skim milk. The cream is processed to produce products of various fat concentrations.

Some milk is dried and powdered, some is condensed (by evaporation) mixed with varying amounts of sugar and canned. Most cream from New Zealand and Australian factories is made into butter. This is done by churning the cream until the fat globules coagulate and form a monolithic mass. This butter mass is washed and, sometimes, salted to improve keeping qualities. The residual buttermilk goes on to further processing. The butter is packaged (25 to 50 kg boxes) and chilled for storage and sale. At a later stage these packages are broken down into home-consumption sized packs.

=== Skimmed milk ===
The product left after the cream is removed is called skim, or skimmed, milk. Varying amounts cream are returned to the skim milk to make low fat milk (semi-skimmed), depending on the market. Whole milk is also made by adding cream back to the skim to standardise the fat content. Other products, such as calcium, vitamin D, and flavouring, may be added.

=== Casein ===
Casein is the predominant phosphoprotein found in fresh milk. It has a very wide range of uses from being a filler for human foods, such as in ice cream, to the manufacture of products such as fabric, adhesives, and plastics.

=== Cheese ===
Cheese is another product made from milk. Whole milk is reacted to form curds that can be compressed, processed and stored to form cheese. In countries where milk is legally allowed to be processed without pasteurisation, a wide range of cheeses can be made using the bacteria found naturally in the milk. In most other countries, the range of cheeses is smaller and the use of artificial cheese curing is greater. Whey is also the byproduct of this process. Some people with lactose intolerance are able to eat certain types of cheese. This is because some traditionally made hard cheeses, and soft ripened cheeses may create less reaction than the equivalent amount of milk because of the processes involved. Fermentation and higher fat content contribute to lesser amounts of lactose. Traditionally made Emmental or Cheddar might contain 10% of the lactose found in whole milk. In addition, the ageing methods of traditional cheeses (sometimes over two years) reduce their lactose content to practically nothing. Commercial cheeses, however, are often manufactured by processes that do not have the same lactose-reducing properties. Ageing of some cheeses is governed by regulations; in other cases there is no quantitative indication of degree of ageing and concomitant lactose reduction, and lactose content is not usually indicated on labels.

=== Whey ===
In earlier times, whey or milk serum was considered to be a waste product and it was, mostly, fed to pigs as a convenient means of disposal. Beginning about 1950, and mostly since about 1980, lactose and many other products, mainly food additives, are made from both casein and cheese whey.

=== Whey cheese ===
Various whey cheeses are produced from whey. Some taxonomies of dairy products consider whey cheese to be a kind of cheese, others do not.

=== Yogurt ===
Yogurt is produced by inoculating milk with specific bacterial cultures and fermenting it at controlled temperatures.

=== Milk powders ===
Milk is also processed by various drying processes into powders. Whole milk, skim milk, buttermilk, and whey products are dried into a powder form and used for human and animal consumption. The main difference between production of powders for human or for animal consumption is in the protection of the process and the product from contamination. Some people drink milk reconstituted from powdered milk, because milk is roughly 88% water, is often cheaper than fresh milk due to lower transportation costs, and can be stored for several months.

=== Other milk products ===
Kumis is produced commercially in Central Asia. Although traditionally made from mare's milk, modern industrial variants may use cow's milk. In India, which produces 22% of global milk production (as at 2018), a range of traditional milk-based products are produced commercially.

== Milking ==
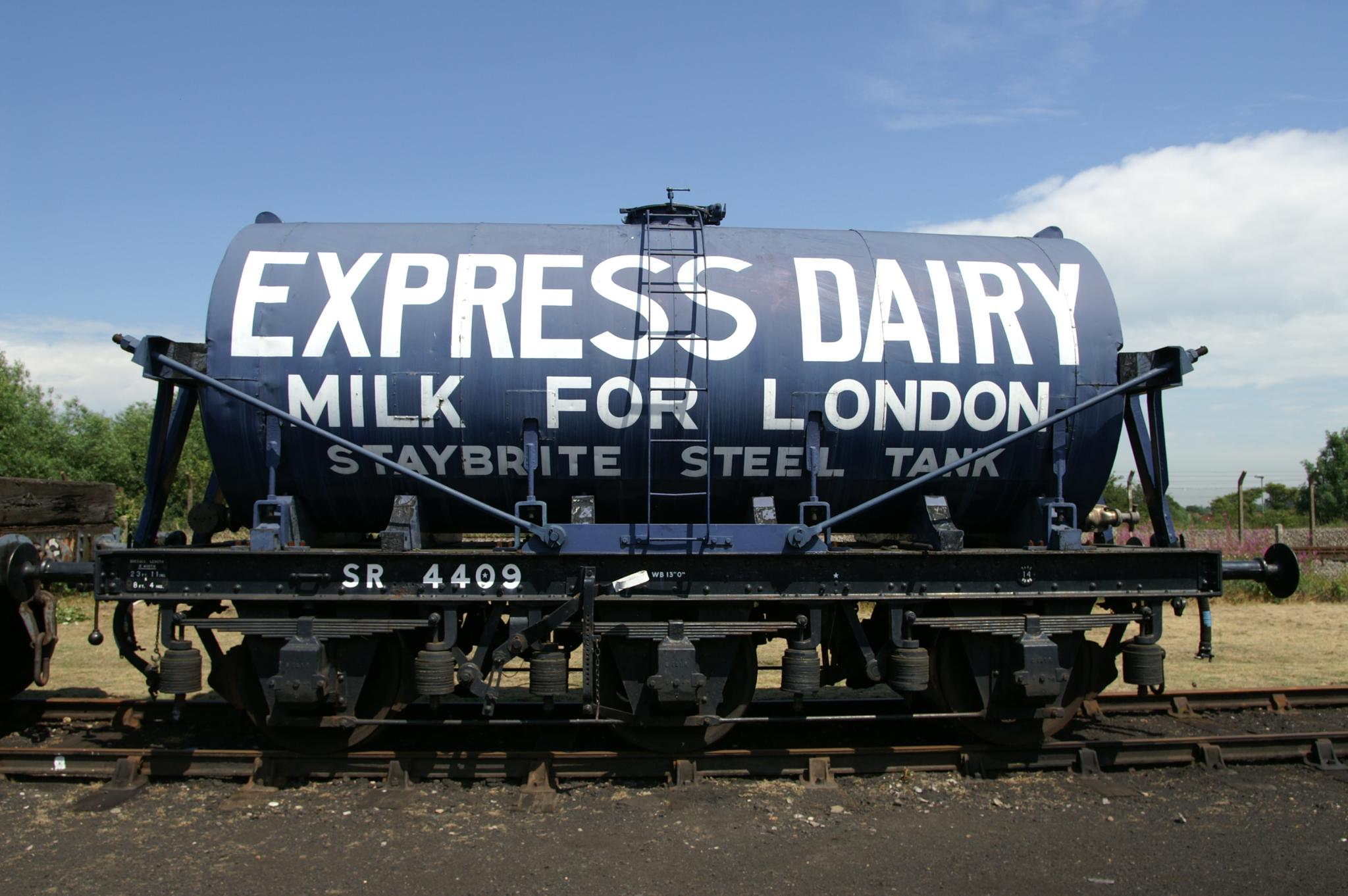
Preserved Express Dairies three-axle Milk Tank Wagon at the Didcot Railway Centre, based on an SR chassis

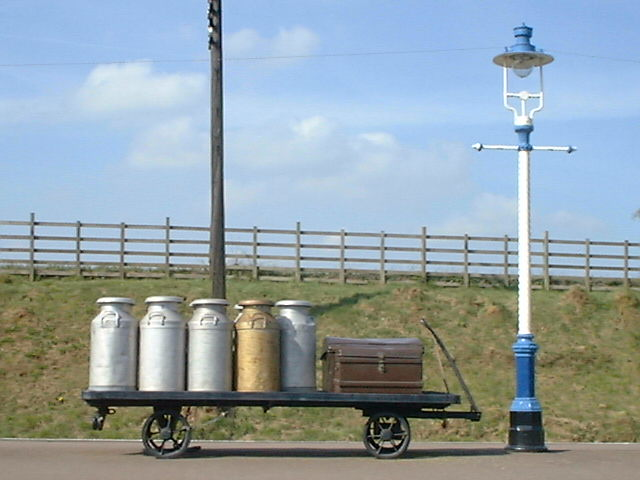
Milk churns on a railway platform

Originally, milking and processing took place on the dairy farm itself. Later, cream was separated from the milk by machine on the farm, and transported to a factory to be made into butter. The skim milk was fed to pigs. This allowed for the high cost of transport (taking the smallest volume high-value product), primitive trucks and the poor quality of roads. Only farms close to factories could afford to take whole milk, which was essential for cheesemaking in industrial quantities, to them.

Originally milk was distributed in 'pails', a lidded bucket with a handle. These proved impractical for transport by road or rail, and so the milk churn was introduced, based on the tall conical shape of the butter churn. Later large railway containers, such as the British Railway Milk Tank Wagon were introduced, enabling the transport of larger quantities of milk, and over longer distances.

The development of refrigeration and better road transport, in the late 1950s, has meant that most farmers milk their cows and only temporarily store the milk in large refrigerated bulk tanks, from where it is later transported by truck to central processing facilities.

In many European countries, particularly the United Kingdom, milk is then delivered direct to customers' homes by a milk float.

In the United States, a dairy cow produced about 5,300 pounds (2,400 kg) of milk per year in 1950, while the average Holstein cow in 2019 produces more than 23,000 pounds (10,000 kg) of milk per year.

=== Milking machines ===
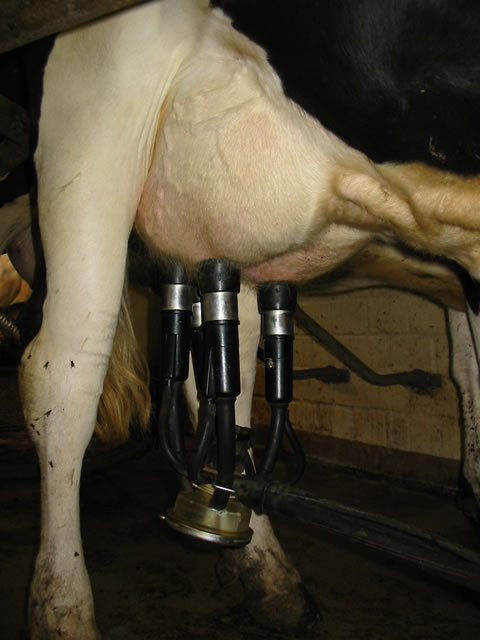
The milking machine extracts milk from all teats.

Milking machines are used to harvest milk from cows when manual milking becomes inefficient or labour-intensive. One early model was patented in 1907. The milking unit is the portion of a milking machine for removing milk from an udder. It is made up of a claw, four teatcups, (Shells and rubber liners) long milk tube, long pulsation tube, and a pulsator. The claw is an assembly that connects the short pulse tubes and short milk tubes from the teatcups to the long pulse tube and long milk tube. (Cluster assembly) Claws are commonly made of stainless steel or plastic or both. Teatcups are composed of a rigid outer shell (stainless steel or plastic) that holds a soft inner liner or inflation. Transparent sections in the shell may allow viewing of liner collapse and milk flow. The annular space between the shell and liner is called the pulse chamber.

Milking machines work in a way that is different from hand milking or calf suckling. Continuous vacuum is applied inside the soft liner to massage milk from the teat by creating a pressure difference across the teat canal (or opening at the end of the teat). Vacuum also helps keep the machine attached to the cow. The vacuum applied to the teat causes congestion of teat tissues (accumulation of blood and other fluids). Atmospheric air is admitted into the pulsation chamber about once per second (the pulsation rate) to allow the liner to collapse around the end of teat and relieve congestion in the teat tissue. The ratio of the time that the liner is open (milking phase) and closed (rest phase) is called the pulsation ratio.

The four streams of milk from the teatcups are usually combined in the claw and transported to the milkline, or the collection bucket (usually sized to the output of one cow) in a single milk hose. Milk is then transported (manually in buckets) or with a combination of airflow and mechanical pump to a central storage vat or bulk tank. Milk is refrigerated on the farm in most countries either by passing through a heat-exchanger or in the bulk tank, or both.

The photo to the right shows a bucket milking system with the stainless steel bucket visible on the far side of the cow. The two rigid stainless steel teatcup shells applied to the front two quarters of the udder are visible. The top of the flexible liner is visible at the top of the shells as are the short milk tubes and short pulsation tubes extending from the bottom of the shells to the claw. The bottom of the claw is transparent to allow observation of milk flow. When milking is completed the vacuum to the milking unit is shut off and the teatcups are removed.

Milking machines keep the milk enclosed and safe from external contamination. The interior 'milk contact' surfaces of the machine are kept clean by a manual or automated washing procedures implemented after milking is completed. Milk contact surfaces must comply with regulations requiring food-grade materials (typically stainless steel and special plastics and rubber compounds) and are easily cleaned.

Most milking machines are powered by electricity but, in case of electrical failure, there can be an alternative means of motive power, often an internal combustion engine, for the vacuum and milk pumps.

=== Milking shed layouts ===
A dairy farmer prepares cows for milking at a modern dairy facility in Highgate Center, Vermont.

==== Bail-style sheds ====
This type of milking facility was the first development, after open-paddock milking, for many farmers. The building was a long, narrow, lean-to shed that was open along one long side. The cows were held in a yard at the open side and when they were about to be milked, they were positioned in one of the bails (stalls). Usually, the cows were restrained in the bail with a breech chain and a rope to restrain the outer back leg. The cow could not move about excessively and the milker could expect not to be kicked or trampled while sitting on a (three-legged) stool and milking into a bucket. When each cow was finished, she backed out into the yard again. The UK bail, initially developed by Wiltshire dairy farmer Arthur Hosier, was a six standing mobile shed with steps that the cow mounted, so the herdsman did not have to bend so low. The milking equipment was much as today, a vacuum from a pump, pulsators, a claw-piece with pipes leading to the four shells and liners that stimulate and suck the milk from the teat. The milk went into churns, via a cooler.

As herd sizes increased a door was set into the front of each bail so that when the milking was done for any cow the milker could, after undoing the leg-rope and with a remote link, open the door and allow her to exit to the pasture. The door was closed, the next cow walked into the bail and was secured. When milking machines were introduced bails were set in pairs so that a cow was being milked in one paired bail while the other could be prepared for milking. When one was finished the machine's cups are swapped to the other cow. This is the same as for Swingover Milking Parlours as described below except that the cups are loaded on the udder from the side. As herd numbers increased it was easier to double-up the cup-sets and milk both cows simultaneously than to increase the number of bails. About 50 cows an hour can be milked in a shed with 8 bails by one person. Using the same teat cups for successive cows has the danger of transmitting infection, mastitis, from one cow to another. Some farmers have devised their own ways to disinfect the clusters between cows.

==== Herringbone milking parlours ====
In herringbone milking sheds, or parlours, cows enter, in single file, and line up almost perpendicular to the central aisle of the milking parlour on both sides of a central pit in which the milker works (you can visualise a fishbone with the ribs representing the cows and the spine being the milker's working area; the cows face outward). After washing the udder and teats the cups of the milking machine are applied to the cows, from the rear of their hind legs, on both sides of the working area. Large herringbone sheds can milk up to 600 cows efficiently with two people.

==== Swingover milking parlours ====
Swingover parlours are the same as herringbone parlours except they have only one set of milking cups to be shared between the two rows of cows, as one side is being milked the cows on the other side are moved out and replaced with unmilked ones. The advantage of this system is that it is less costly to equip, however it operates at slightly better than half-speed and one would not normally try to milk more than about 100 cows with one person.

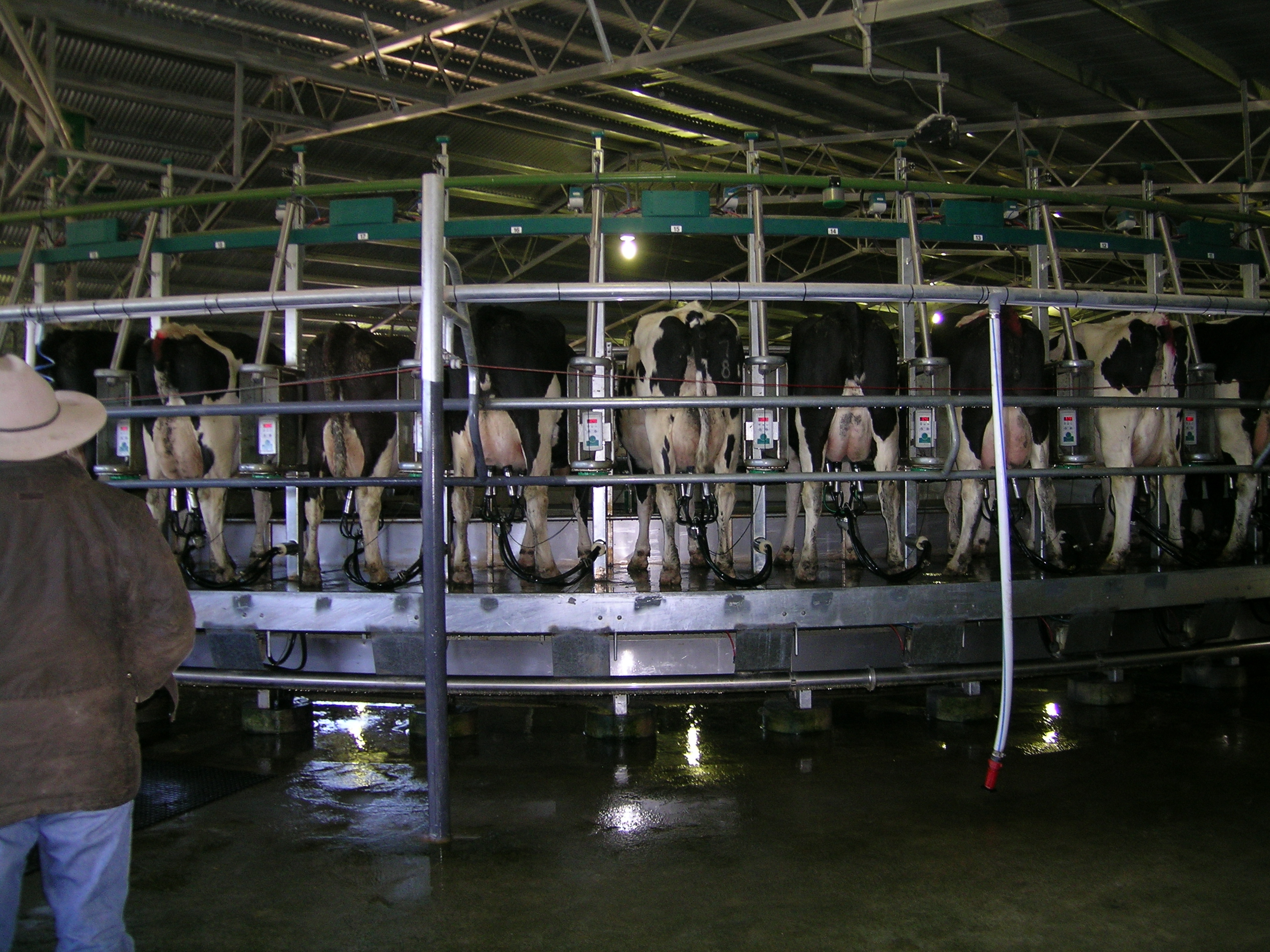
80-stand rotary dairy that is fully computerised and records milk production

==== Rotary milking sheds ====
Rotary milking sheds (also known as Rotary milking parlor) consist of a turntable with about 12 to 100 individual stalls for cows around the outer edge. A "good" rotary will be operated with 24–32 (~48–50+) stalls by one (two) milkers. The turntable is turned by an electric-motor drive at a rate that one turn is the time for a cow to be milked completely. As an empty stall passes the entrance a cow steps on, facing the center, and rotates with the turntable. The next cow moves into the next vacant stall and so on. The operator, or milker, cleans the teats, attaches the cups and does any other feeding or whatever husbanding operations that are necessary. Cows are milked as the platform rotates. The milker, or an automatic device, removes the milking machine cups and the cow backs out and leaves at an exit just before the entrance. The rotary system is capable of milking very large herds—over a thousand cows.

==== Automatic milking sheds ====
Automatic milking or 'robotic milking' sheds can be seen in Australia, New Zealand, the U.S., Canada, and many European countries. Current automatic milking sheds use the voluntary milking (VM) method. These allow the cows to voluntarily present themselves for milking at any time of the day or night, although repeat visits may be limited by the farmer through computer software. A robot arm is used to clean teats and apply milking equipment, while automated gates direct cow traffic, eliminating the need for the farmer to be present during the process. The entire process is computer controlled.

==== Supplementary accessories in sheds ====
Farmers soon realised that a milking shed was a good place to feed cows supplementary foods that overcame local dietary deficiencies or added to the cows' wellbeing and production. Each bail might have a box into which such feed is delivered as the cow arrives so that she is eating while being milked. A computer can read the eartag of each animal to ration the correct individual supplement. A close alternative is to use 'out-of-parlour-feeders', stalls that respond to a transponder around the cow's neck that is programmed to provide each cow with a supplementary feed, the quantity dependent on her production, stage in lactation, and the benefits of the main ration

The holding yard at the entrance of the shed is important as a means of keeping cows moving into the shed. Most yards have a powered gate that ensures that the cows are kept close to the shed.

Water is a vital commodity on a dairy farm: cows drink about 20 gallons (80 litres) a day, sheds need water to cool and clean them. Pumps and reservoirs are common at milking facilities. Water can be warmed by heat transfer with milk.

=== Temporary milk storage ===
Milk from a cow is transported to a nearby storage vessel by the airflow leaking around the cups on the cow or by a special "air inlet" (5–10 L/min free air) in the claw. From there it is pumped by a mechanical pump and cooled by a heat exchanger. The milk is then stored in a large vat, or bulk tank, which is usually refrigerated until collection for processing.

== Waste disposal and wastewater management ==
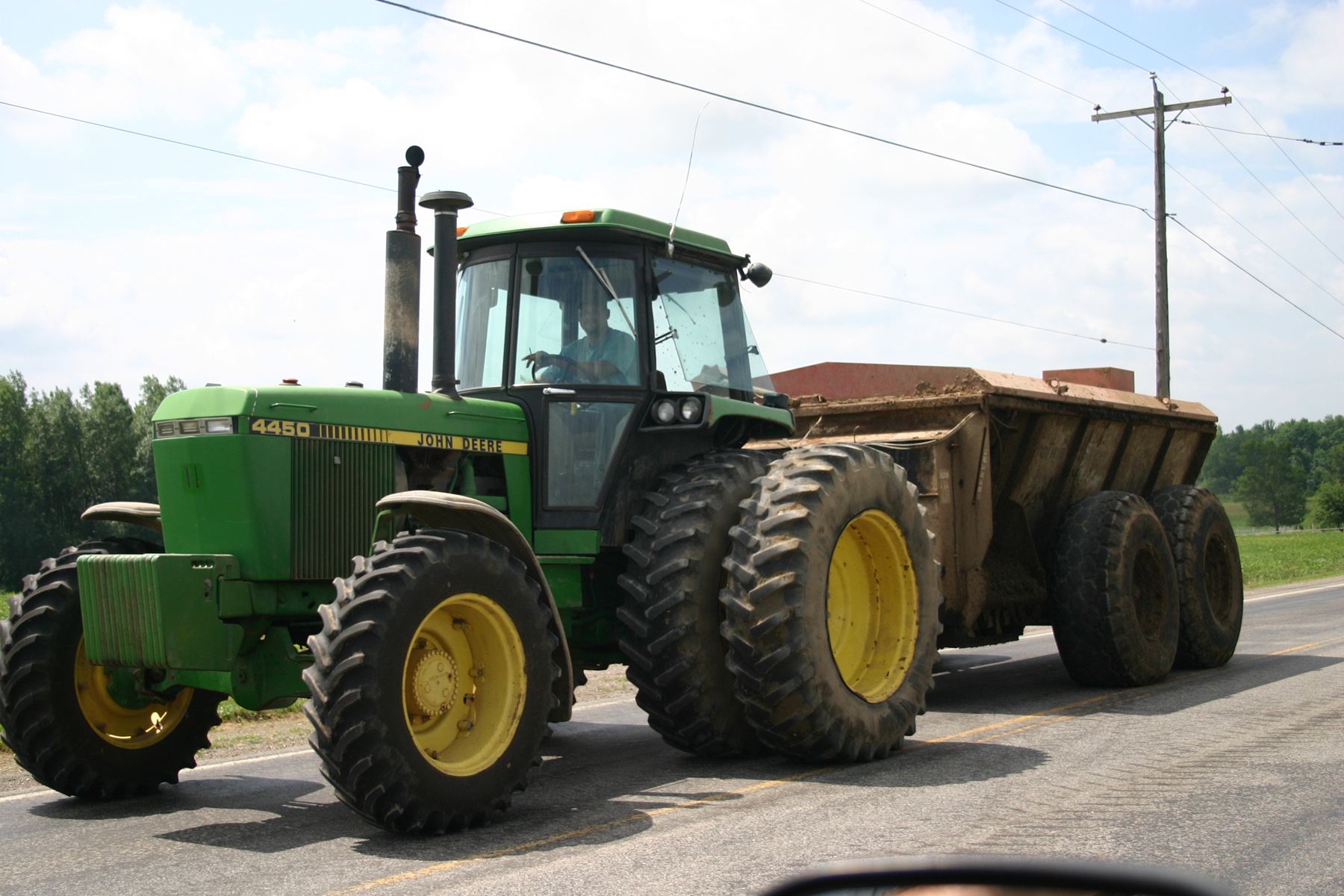
Manure spreader going to the field from a dairy farm, Elba, New York

In countries where cows are grazed outside year-round, waste disposal issues need to be dealt with. The most concentrated waste is at the milking shed, where the animal waste may be liquefied (during the water-washing process) or left in a more solid form, either to be returned to be used on farm ground as organic fertiliser.

In the associated milk processing factories, most of the waste is washing water that is treated, usually by composting, and spread on farm fields in either liquid or solid form. This is much different from half a century ago, when the main products were butter, cheese and casein, and the rest of the milk had to be disposed of as waste (sometimes as animal feed).

In the dairy industries, there are two main types of wastewater produced: dairy wastewater and cheese whey. Dairy wastewater consists of material losses from the dairy products, effluents from the washing of tanks and equipment, and sanitary wastewater from toilets and sinks. The typical concentrations of BOD and total Kjeldahl nitrogen for dairy wastewater range from 1200 to 5000 mg/L and 30 to 200 mg/L, respectively. Cheese whey is the liquid remaining after the formation of curds. It contains important amounts of carbohydrates, proteins, lactic acid, fats, and salts and its BOD value can exceed 40,000 mg/L. Dairy wastewater management usually includes equalisation, neutralisation and physical separation followed by biological treatment, while cheese whey is treated in anaerobic digesters or passes through membranes for protein recovery.

In dairy-intensive areas, various methods have been proposed for disposing of large quantities of milk. Large application rates of milk on the land, or disposing in a hole, is problematic as the residue from the decomposing milk will block the soil pores and thereby reduce the water infiltration rate through the soil profile. As recovery of this effect can take time, any land-based application needs to be well managed and considered. Other waste milk disposal methods commonly employed include solidification and disposal at a solid waste landfill, disposal at a wastewater treatment plant, or discharge into a sanitary sewer.

== Associated diseases ==
Dairy products manufactured under unsanitary or unsuitable conditions have an increased chance of containing bacteria. Proper sanitation practices help to reduce the rate of bacterial contamination, and pasteurisation greatly decreases the amount of contaminated milk that reaches the consumer. Many countries have required government oversight and regulations regarding dairy production, including requirements for pasteurisation.

- Leptospirosis is an infection that can be transmitted to people who work in dairy production sites through exposure to urine or to contaminated water or soil.
- Cowpox is a virus that today is rarely found in either cows or humans. It is a historically important disease, as it led to the first vaccination against the now eradicated smallpox.
- Tuberculosis can be transmitted from cattle, mainly via milk products that are unpasteurised. The disease has been eradicated from many countries by testing for the disease and culling suspected animals.
- Brucellosis is a bacterial disease transmitted to humans by dairy products and direct animal contact. Brucellosis has been eradicated from certain countries by testing for the disease and culling suspected animals.
- Listeria is a bacterial disease associated with unpasteurised milk, and can affect some cheeses made in traditional ways. Careful observance of the traditional cheesemaking methods achieves reasonable protection for the consumer.
- Crohn's disease has been linked to infection with the bacterium M. paratuberculosis, which has been found in pasteurised retail milk in the UK and the USA. M. paratuberculosis causes a similar disorder, Johne's disease, in livestock.

== Animal rights ==
A portion of the population, including vegans and many Jains, object to dairy production as unethical, cruel to animals, and environmentally deleterious. They do not consume dairy products given these ethical concerns. They state that cattle suffer under conditions employed by the dairy industry and how they are eventually killed for meat once their milk production declines.

Some animal rights scholars consider dairy as part of what they call the animal–industrial complex. According to Kathleen Stachowski, the animal–industrial complex "naturalizes the human as a consumer of other animals," whose enormity includes "its long reach into our lives, and how well it has done its job normalizing brutality toward the animals whose very existence is forgotten". She states that the corporate dairy industry, the government, and schools forms the animal–industrial complex troika of immense influence, which hides from the public's view the animal rights violations and cruelties happening within the dairy industry. Stachowski also states that the troika "hijacks" schoolchildren by promoting milk in the K-12 nutrition education curriculum and making them "eat the products of industrial animal production".

=== Bovine growth hormone ===
In 1937, it was found that bovine somatotropin (BST or bovine growth hormone) would increase the yield of milk. Several pharmaceutical companies developed commercial rBST products and they have been approved for use in the U.S., Mexico, Brazil, India, Russia, and at least ten others. The World Health Organization, and others have stated that dairy products and meat from BST-treated cows are safe for human consumption. However, based on negative animal welfare effects, rBST has not been allowed in Canada, Australia, New Zealand, Japan, Israel, or the European Union since 2000 – and in the U.S. has lost popularity due to consumer demands for rBST-free cows, with only about 17% of all cows in America now receiving rBST.

== Climate change and dairy production ==
In 2009, there were 1.2 billion cattle in the world, with around 82% in the developing countries. The number has increased since then, with the 2021 figure at 1.53 billion. In 2020, it was found that in a current Eastern Mediterranean climate, cattle experience mild heat stress inside unadapted stalls for nearly half a year (159 days). Moderate heat stress is felt indoors and outdoors during May, June, July, August, September, and October. June and August are the months where cattle are exposed to severe heat stress outside, which is mitigated to moderate heat stress indoors.

== See also ==
- Dairy industry in the United Kingdom
- Dairy industry in the United States
- Dairy and health
- Dairy product
- Holstein Friesian cattle
- Milk car
