= Southern Dairy Compact =

The Southern Dairy Compact was an agreement among 13 southern United States states. It was proposed to ensure the continued marketability of dairy producers in the member states and to supply a stable, local supply of milk products to the region. The proposed agreement was modeled on the Northeast Interstate Dairy Compact, which would allow member states to jointly establish a minimum farm price for fluid milk that is above the federally mandated minimum price level in the region.

Many southern state legislatures approved membership in the compact, but the required congressional authority to form a compact was never granted. In the 2002 Farm Bill, a support program, Milk Income Loss Contract Payments, for participating dairy farmers nationwide was enacted, allowing for subsidies when the price falls below 16.94 per cwt.
