= Dairy Price Support Program =

US federal program for maintaining milk prices

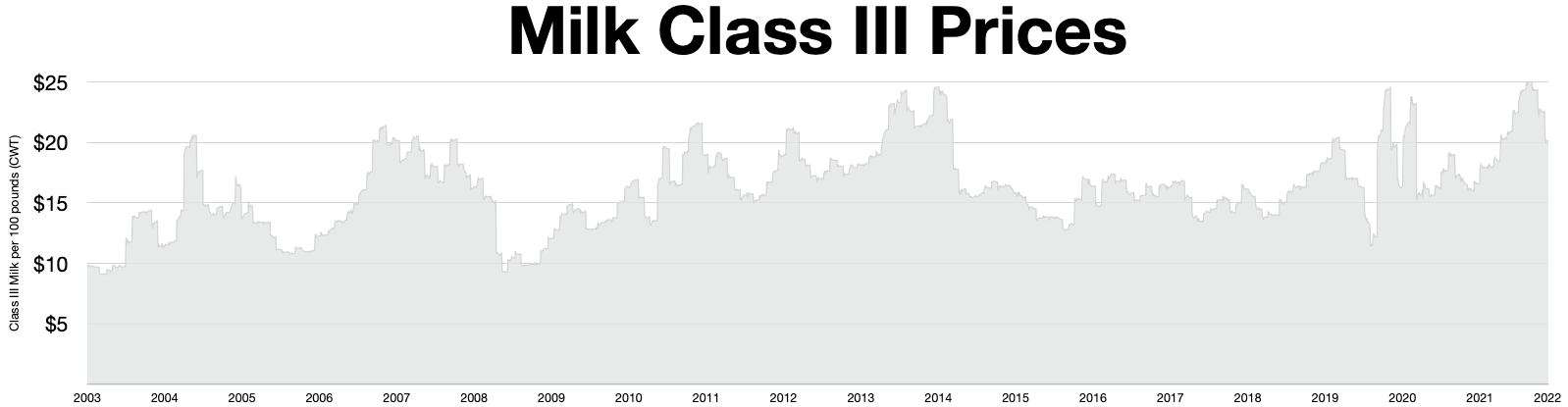
Milk class III price

In the United States, the Dairy Price Support Program is the federal government program that maintains a minimum farm price for milk used in the manufacture of dairy products. It is one of many agricultural support programs. Under the dairy program, the United States Department of Agriculture (USDA) indirectly assures a minimum price for milk by purchasing any cheddar cheese, nonfat dry milk, and butter offered to it by dairy processors at stated prices. These purchase prices are set high enough to enable dairy processors to pay farmers at least the support price for the milk they use in manufacturing these products.

The 2002 farm bill (P.L. 107-171, Sec. 1501) mandated a support price of $9.90/cwt, effective through December 31, 2007, when the program by law was scheduled to expire. The farm bill also established a Milk Income Loss Contract (MILC) program that makes direct payments to participating dairy farmers whenever the minimum monthly market price for farm milk used for fluid consumption in Boston falls below $16.94 per hundredweight (cwt.). The MILC program has been reauthorized until September 30, 2012.

The DPSP was cancelled though the Agricultural Act of 2014.
