= Northeast Interstate Dairy Compact =

Compact member states

The Northeast Interstate Dairy Compact was an Interstate compact among the six New England states, agreeing to support the farm price of milk at a higher level than under federally mandated minimum prices in the region.

The compact created a Northeast Dairy Compact Commission, based in Montpelier, Vermont, charged with setting prices and regulating bulk milk handlers. From 1997 until its expiration on September 30, 2001, the Northeast compact required processors in the region to pay dairy farmers at least $16.94/cwt for farm milk used for fluid consumption.

== Membership ==
The six New England states of Connecticut, Maine, Massachusetts, New Hampshire, Rhode Island, and Vermont made up the compact.

The law allowed membership in the compact to expand to New York, New Jersey, Pennsylvania, Delaware, Maryland and Virginia, if the prospective state was contiguous to a member state, and if the compact was approved by the state legislature of the prospective state and the U.S. Congress. Although many states expressed interest in joining the compact or forming a separate compact, no congressional approval was granted beyond the six New England states due to strong opposition from Upper Midwest dairy farmers and processors.

== Expiration ==
Following controversy and claims of price inflation, in 1999 Congress limited the duration of its authorization of the compact, which ceased operations on September 30, 2001, after intense lobbying on both sides of its extension.

The dairy compact has been replaced with Milk Income Loss Contract (MILC) payments under the 2002 farm bill (P.L. 107-171, Sec. 1502), which mandates direct federal payments to all participating dairy farmers nationwide when the minimum price for fluid farm milk in the Northeast falls below $16.94 per cwt.

== See also ==
- Southern Dairy Compact
