= List of Indian dairy products =

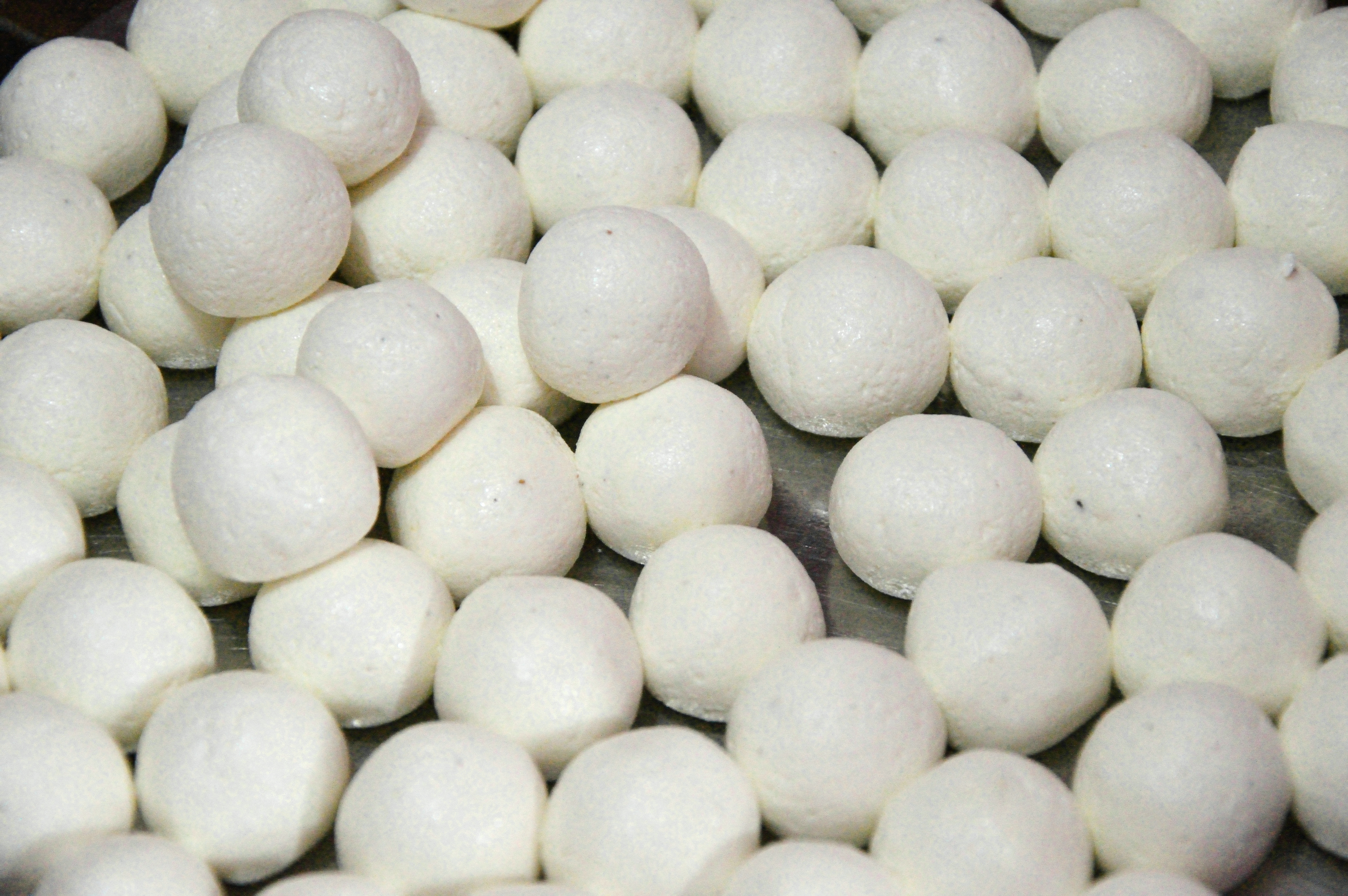
Chhena, an Indian curdled cheese

A variety of dairy products are commonly found in India and an important part of Indian cuisine, some of which are native to India and others which are found in Bangladesh. The majority of these products can be broadly classified into curdled products, like chhena, or non-curdled products, like khoa.

== Curdled dairy products ==
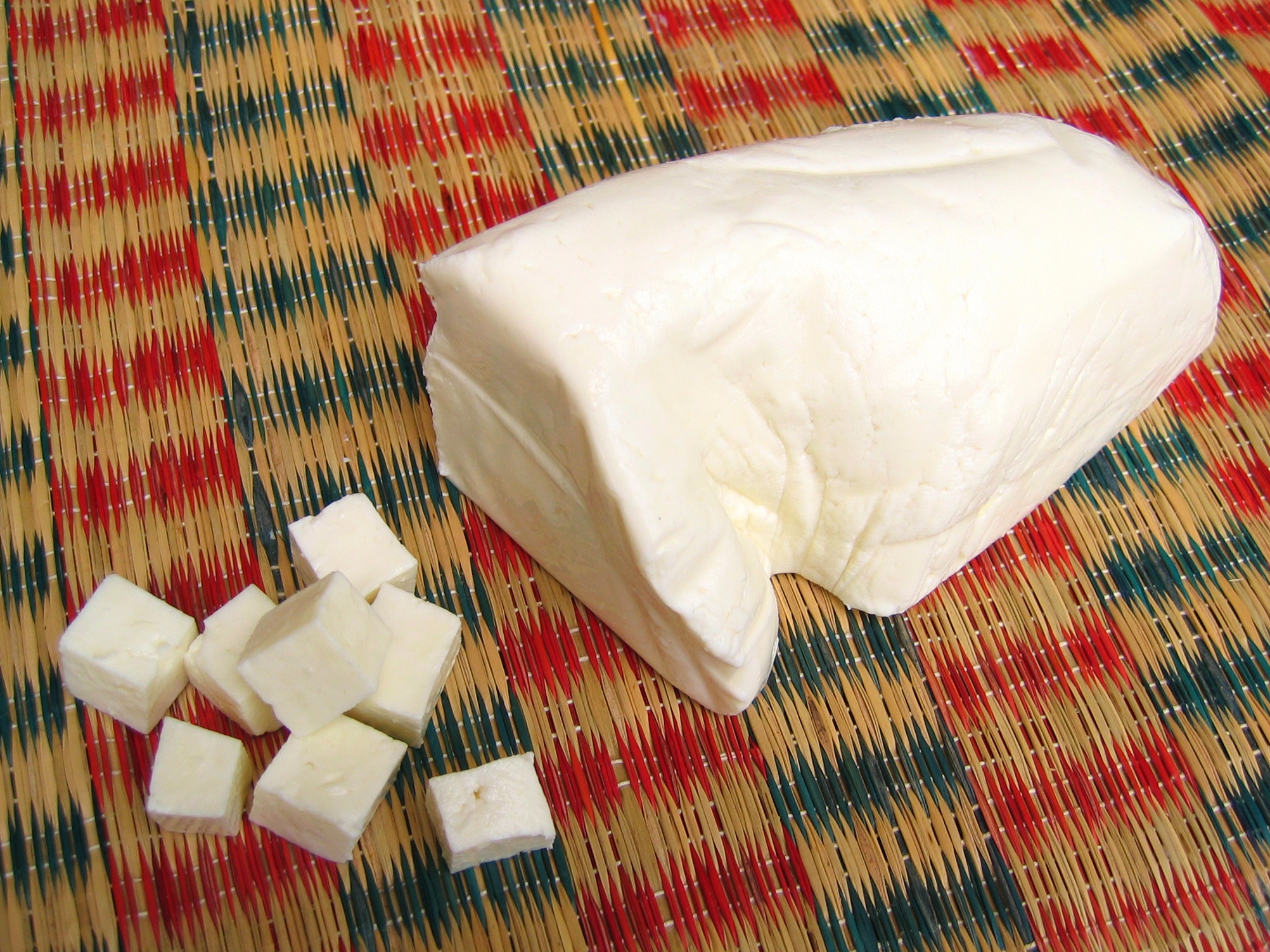
Paneer

- Paneer is an unaged, acid-set, non-melting farmer cheese made by curdling heated milk with lemon juice or other non-rennet food acid, and then removing the whey and pressing the result into a dry unit. It is a popular ingredient in North Indian cuisine.
- Chhena is like paneer, except some whey is left and the mixture is beaten thoroughly until it becomes soft, of smooth consistency, and malleable but firm. It is popular in eastern India and Bangladesh.
- Chhena poda is a roasted, sweetened and tightly packed Chhena. It is popular in the east Indian state of Odisha
- Chhena gaja is a combination of chhena and sooji (semolina). Then molded into palm-sized rectangular shapes (gajas), boiled in thick sugar syrup. It is popular in the east Indian state of Odisha
- Rasabali is a deep fried flattened reddish brown patties of chhena that are soaked in thickened, sweetened milk. It is popular in Odisha.
- Sandesh is a confection made from chhena mixed with sugar then grilled lightly to caramelize, but removed from heat and molded into a ball or some shape. It is the staple sweetmeat of the Indian state of West Bengal alongside neighbouring Bangladesh.
- Rasgulla is a confection made from mixture of chhena and semolina rolled into a ball and boiled in syrup. It is the staple dessert of the Indian states of West Bengal and Odisha alongside neighbouring Bangladesh.
- Khira sagara literally means ocean of milk. It is the mixture of small balls of Chhena in sweetened milk. It is popular in Odisha.

== Non-curdled dairy products ==
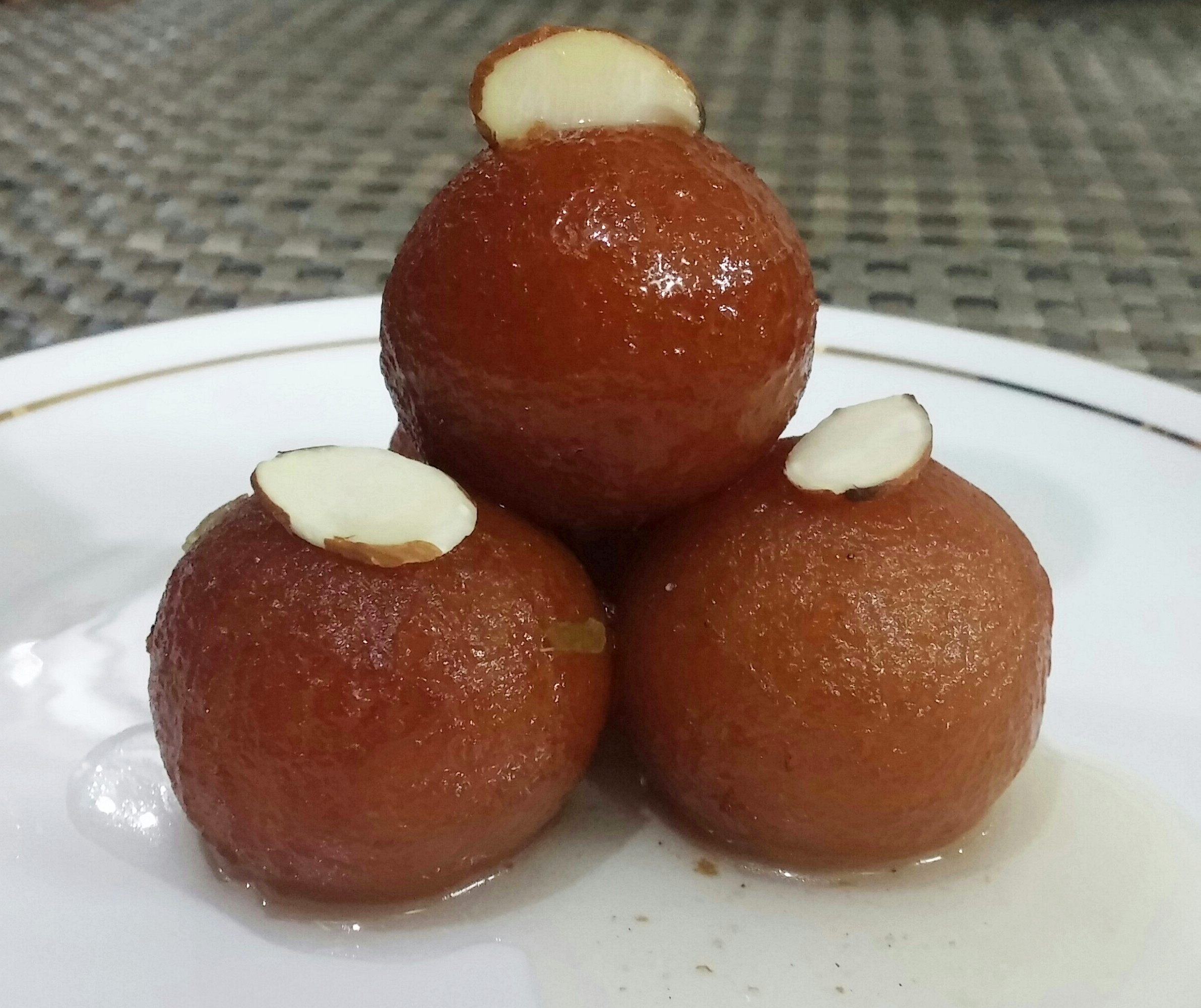
Gulab jamun

- Khoa or mawa is made by reducing milk in an open pan over heat.
- Kheer is a Bengali version of khoa, but it is less harder than khoa and it has a doughy texture rather than the solid texture of khoa.
- Peda is a confection made by mixing sugar with khoa and adding flavoring, such as cardamom.
- Barfi is a confection made by reducing milk and sugar until it solidifies and adding flavoring, such as pistachio.
- Gulab jamun is a confection made by mixing khoa and sugar, caramelizing it by frying, and soaking it in syrup containing rosewater.
- Kulfi is made from slowly freezing sweetened condensed milk. In comparison to ice cream, kulfi is not whipped or otherwise aerated.
- Ghee is type of clarified butter that is cooked long enough to caramelize the milk sugar and sterilize the liquid.

== Fermented dairy products ==
- Mishti doi is yogurt mixed with sugar
- Shrikhand is strained yogurt mixed with sugar, and often flavorings such as cardamom, saffron, or fruit.

== Other dairy products ==
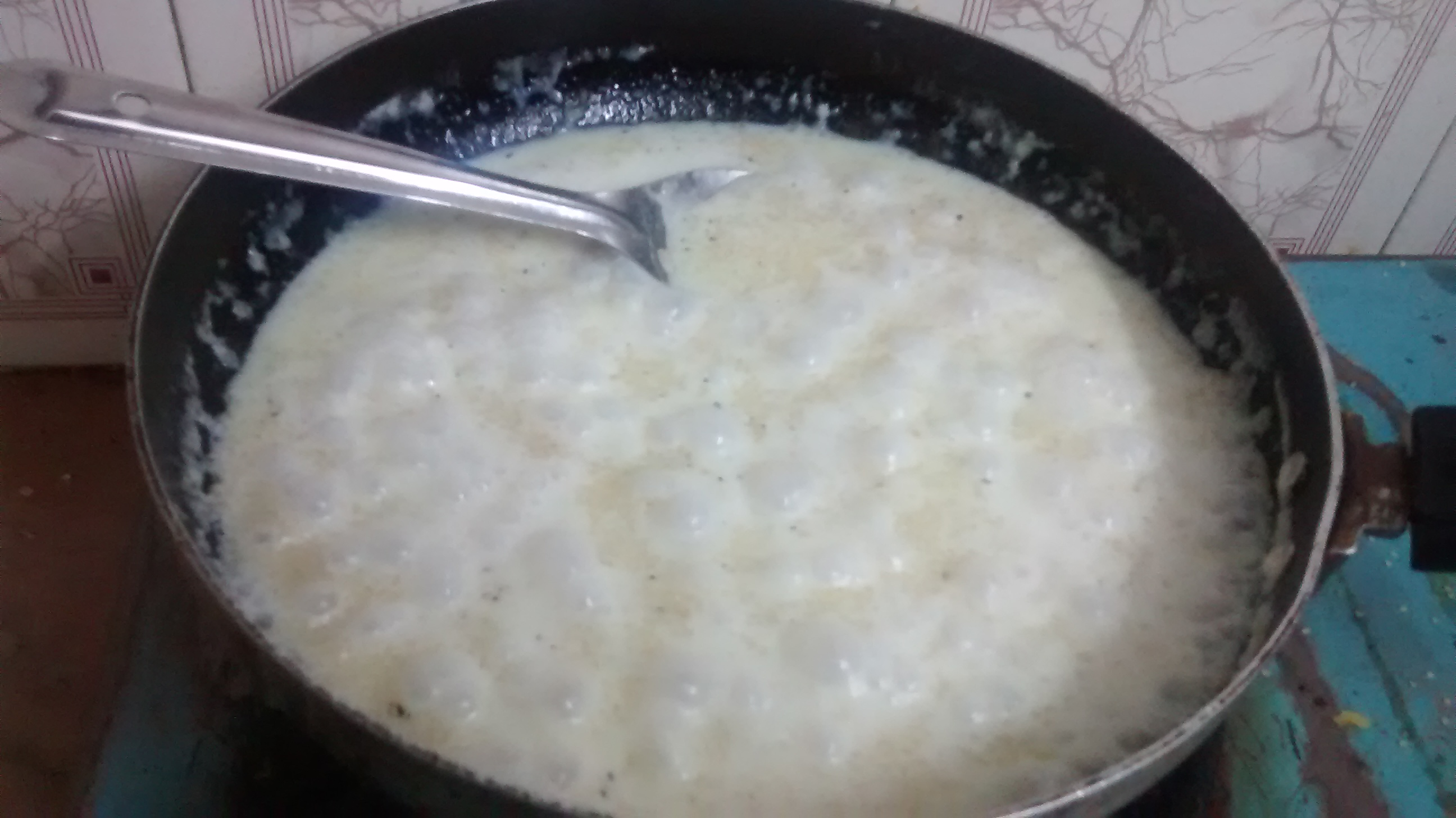
Kheer

- Kheer is made by boiling rice or broken wheat with milk and sugar, and sometimes flavored with cardamom, raisins, saffron, pistachios, or almonds.
- Chhena murki is made by frying cubes of chhena to burn the outside, then soaking them in syrup flavored with cardamom.
- Pantooa is like gulab jamun, except with some chhena mixed with the usual ingredients.

== See also ==
- Dairy in India
- List of dairy products
