= Milk Income Loss Contract Payments =

US dairy farmer counter-cyclical payments program

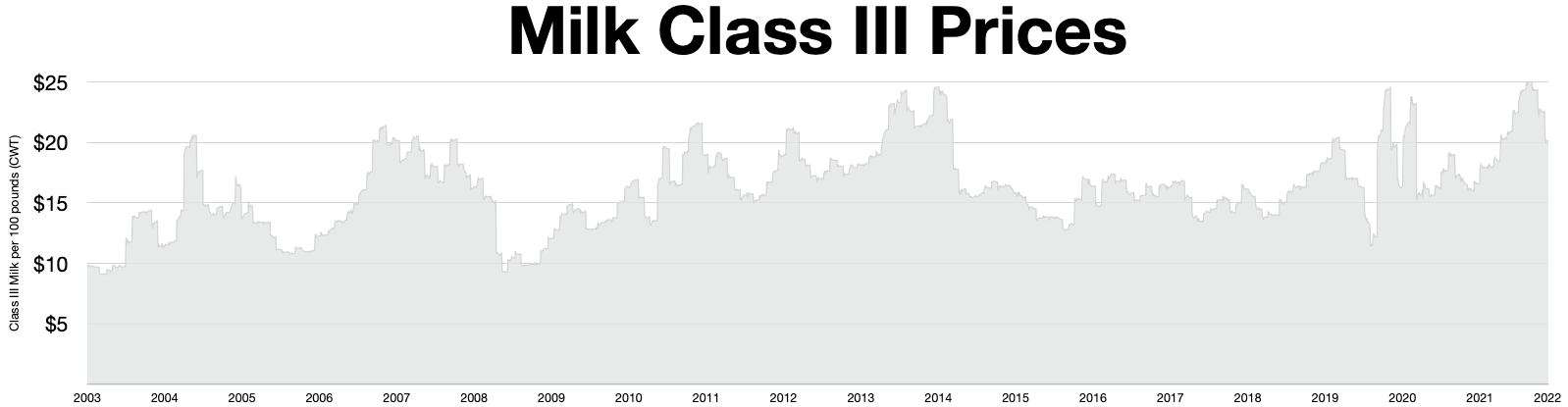
Milk class III price in cwt (Hundredweight)

Milk Income Loss Contract (MILC) Payments is the name given by USDA to the dairy farmer counter-cyclical payments program, authorized by the 2002 farm bill (P.L. 107-171, Sec. 1502, 7 U.S.C. 7982). Under the program, dairy farmers nationwide are eligible for a federal payment whenever the minimum monthly market price for farm milk used for fluid consumption in Boston falls below $16.94/cwt. A producer potentially can receive a payment equal to 45 percent of the difference between the $16.94 per cwt. target price and the market price, in any month that the Boston market price falls below $16.94. A producer can receive a payment on all milk production during that month, but no payments will be made on any annual production in excess of 2.4 million pounds per dairy operation. On average this limit is reached by a milking herd of 130 cows. MILC payments apply to production beginning December 1, 2002 through September 30, 2012.

== See also ==
Dairy Price Support Program
