= Bhubaneswar =

Capital of Odisha, India

Bhubaneswar Bhubaneswara Bhonsar Ekamra Kshetra
- Metropolis
- Bhubaneshwar
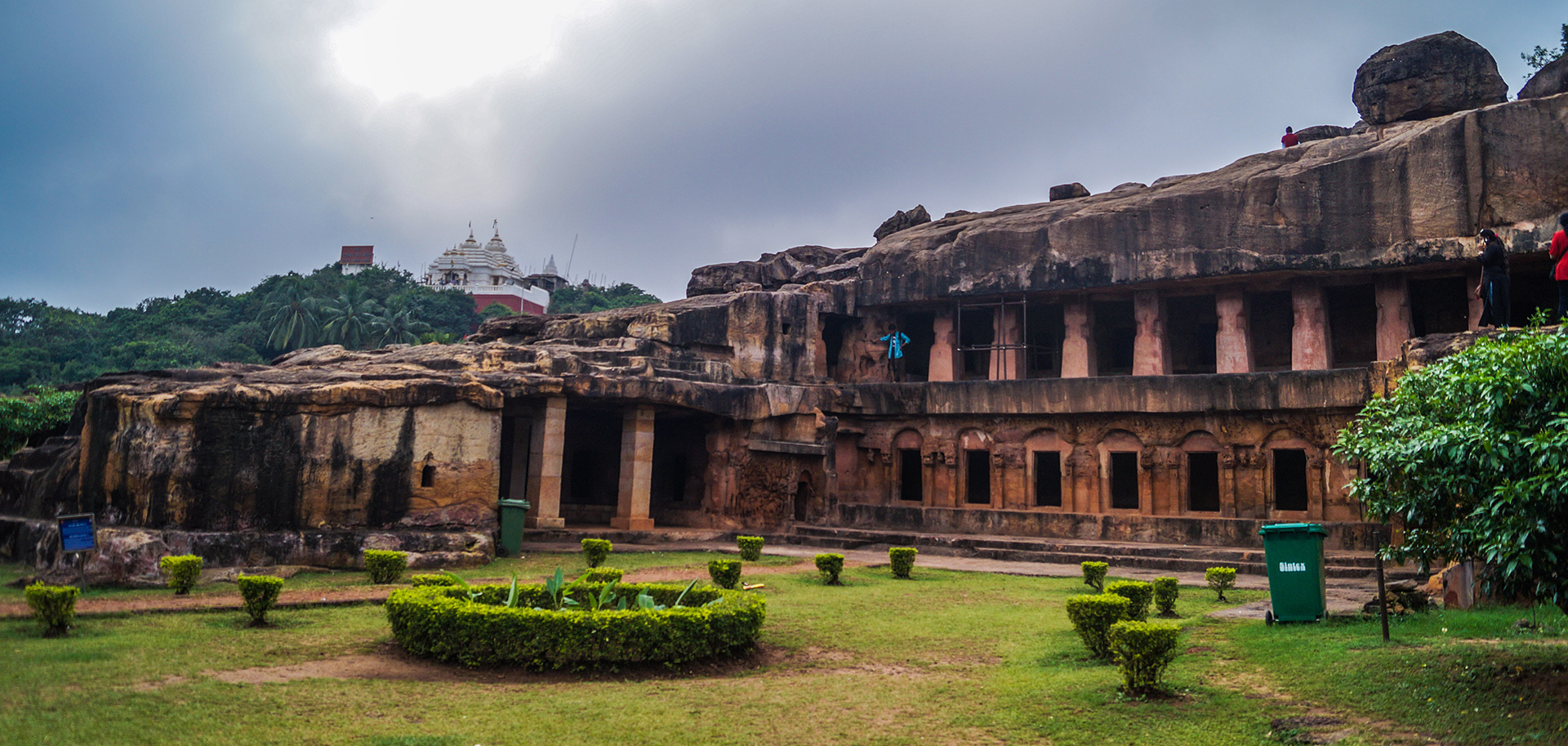
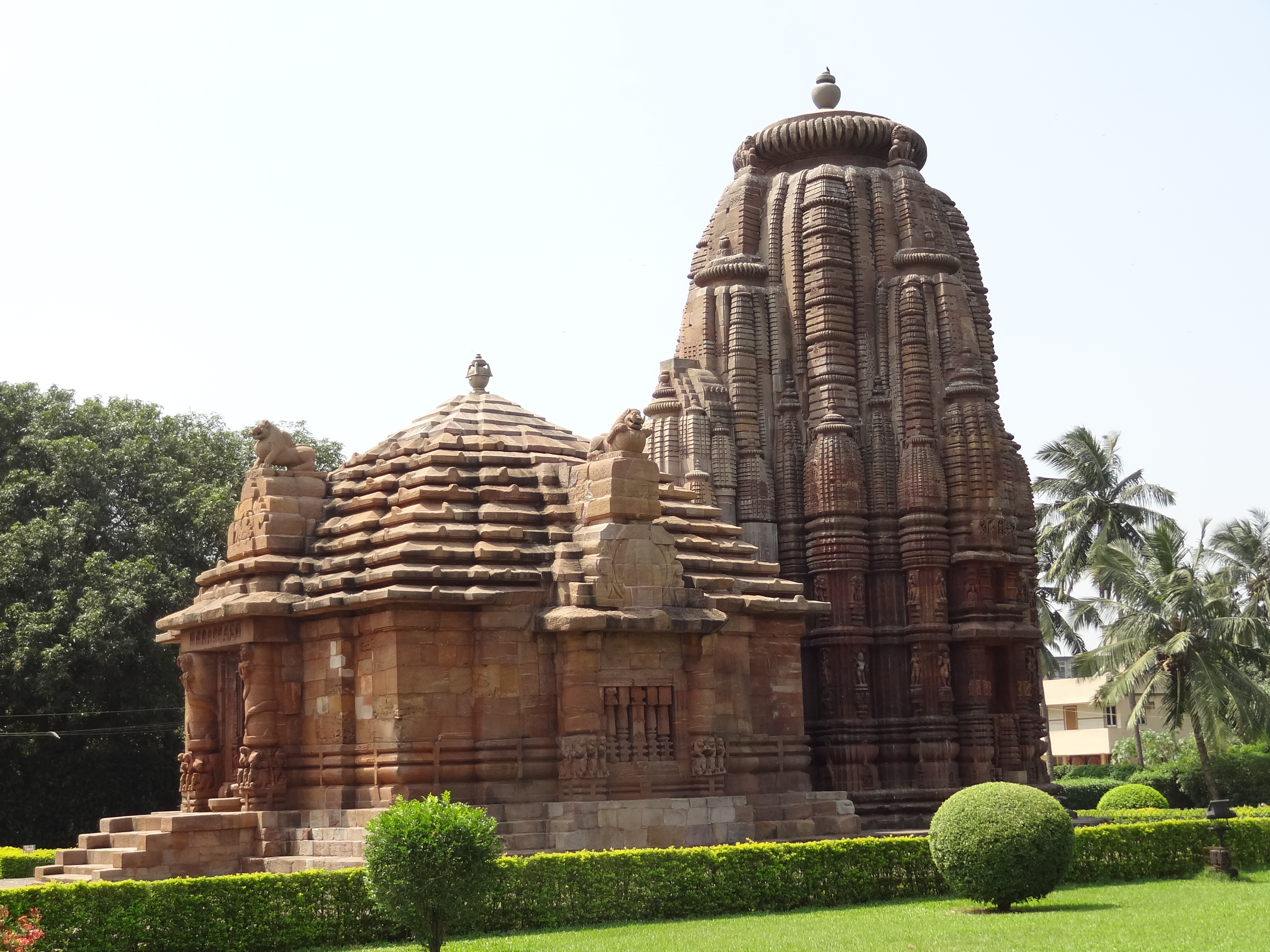
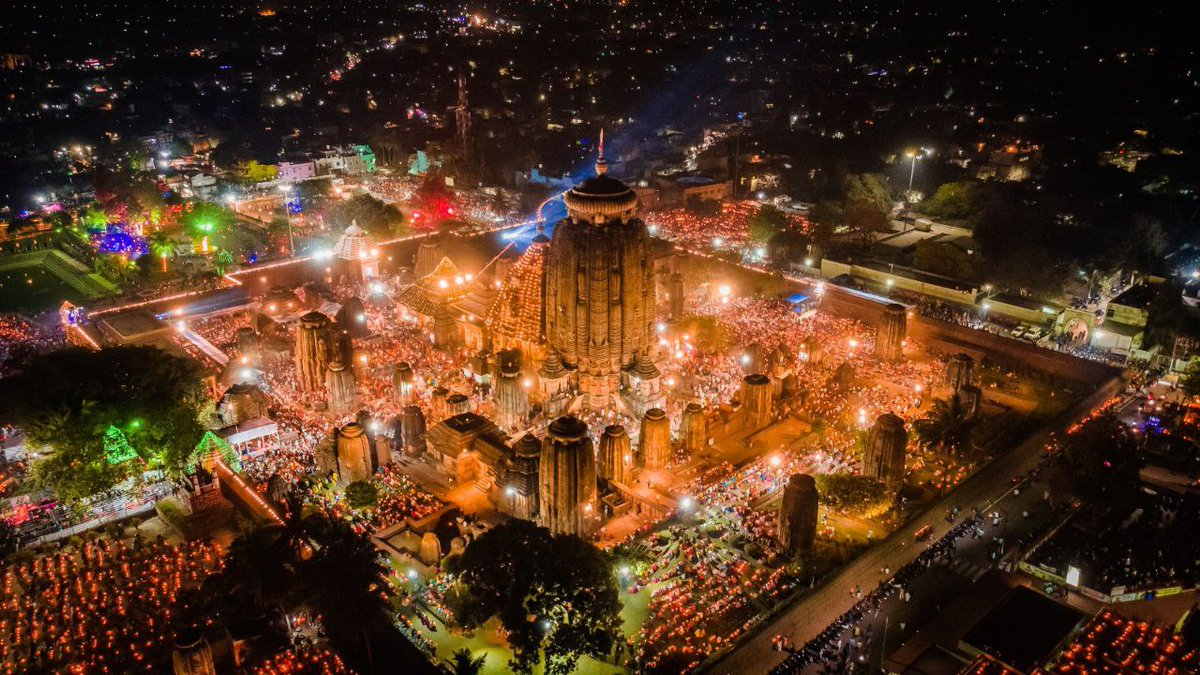
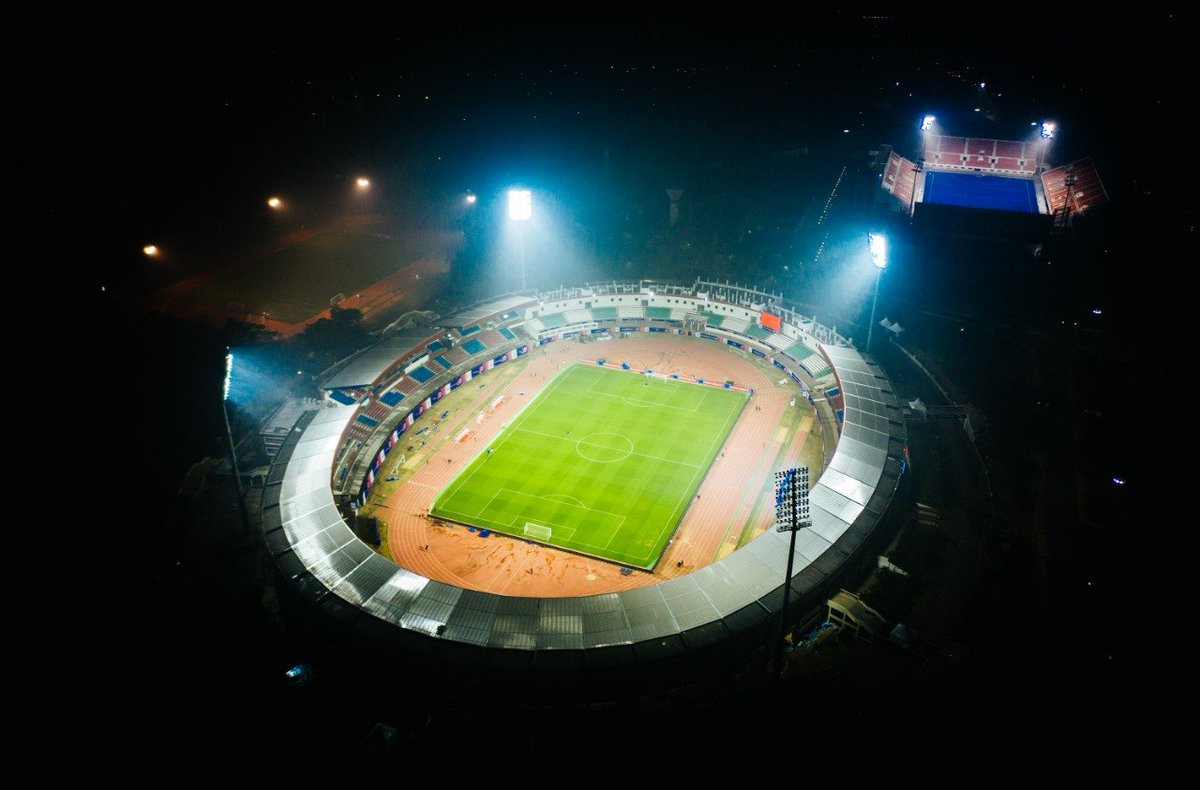
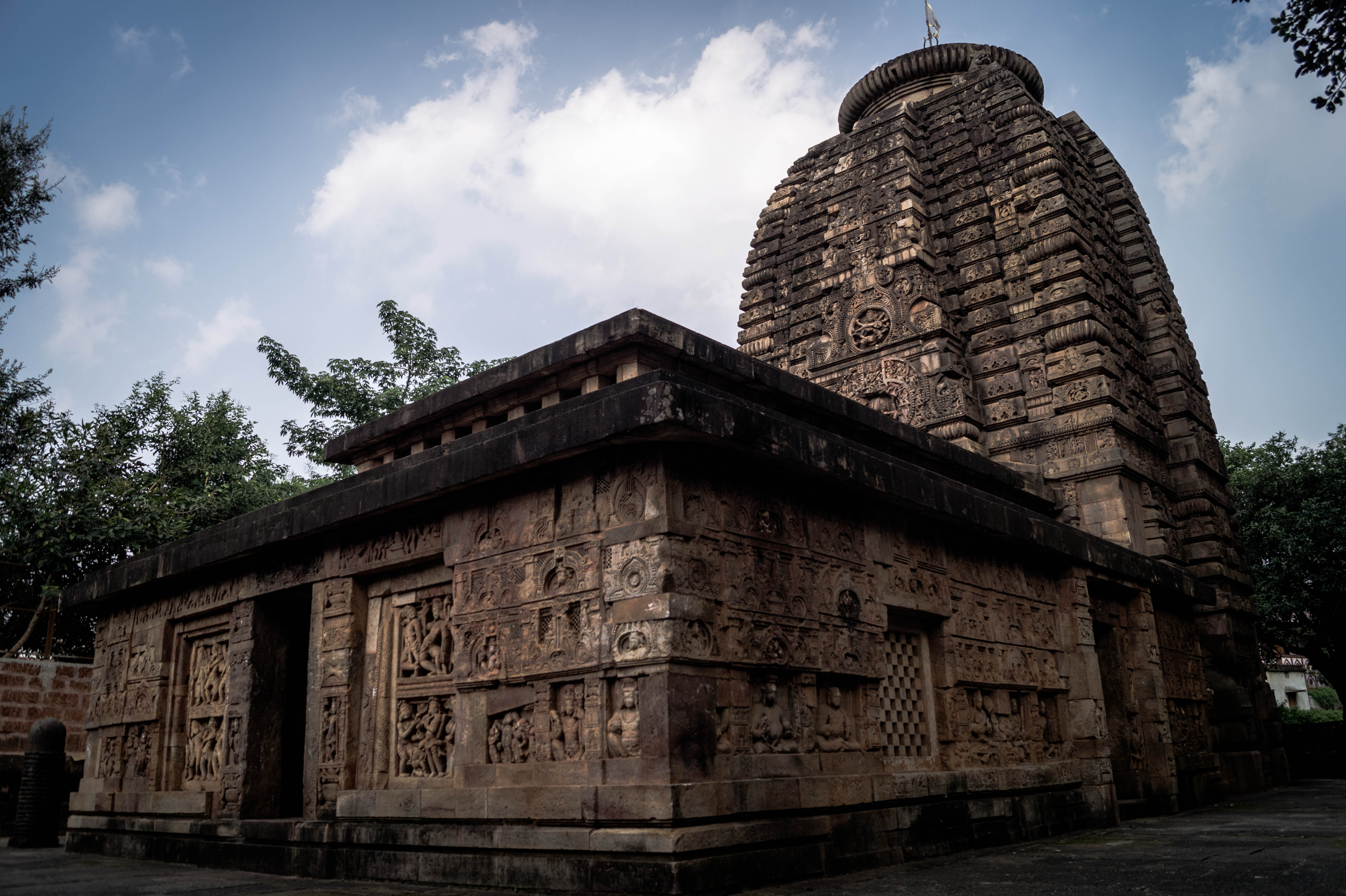
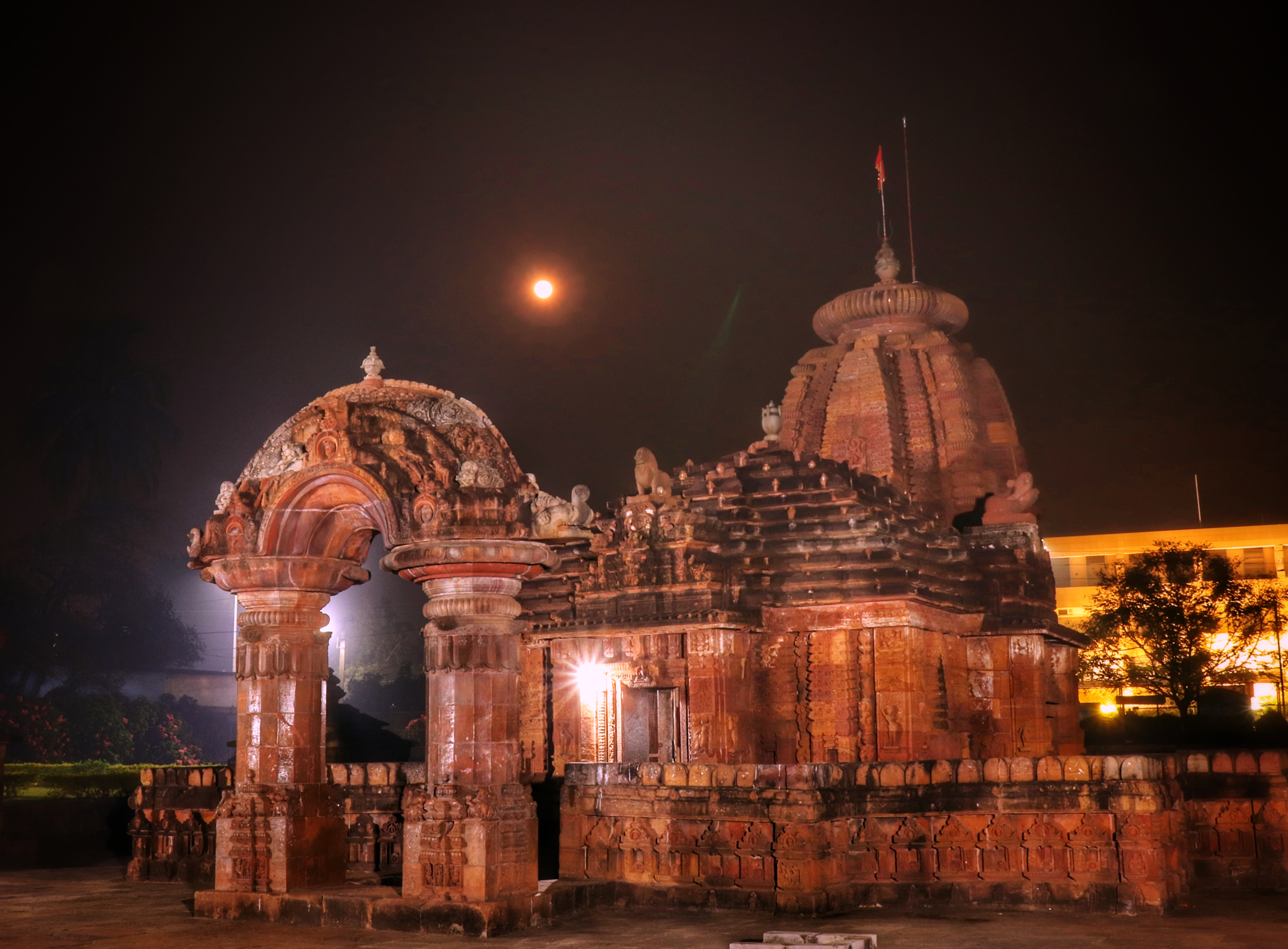
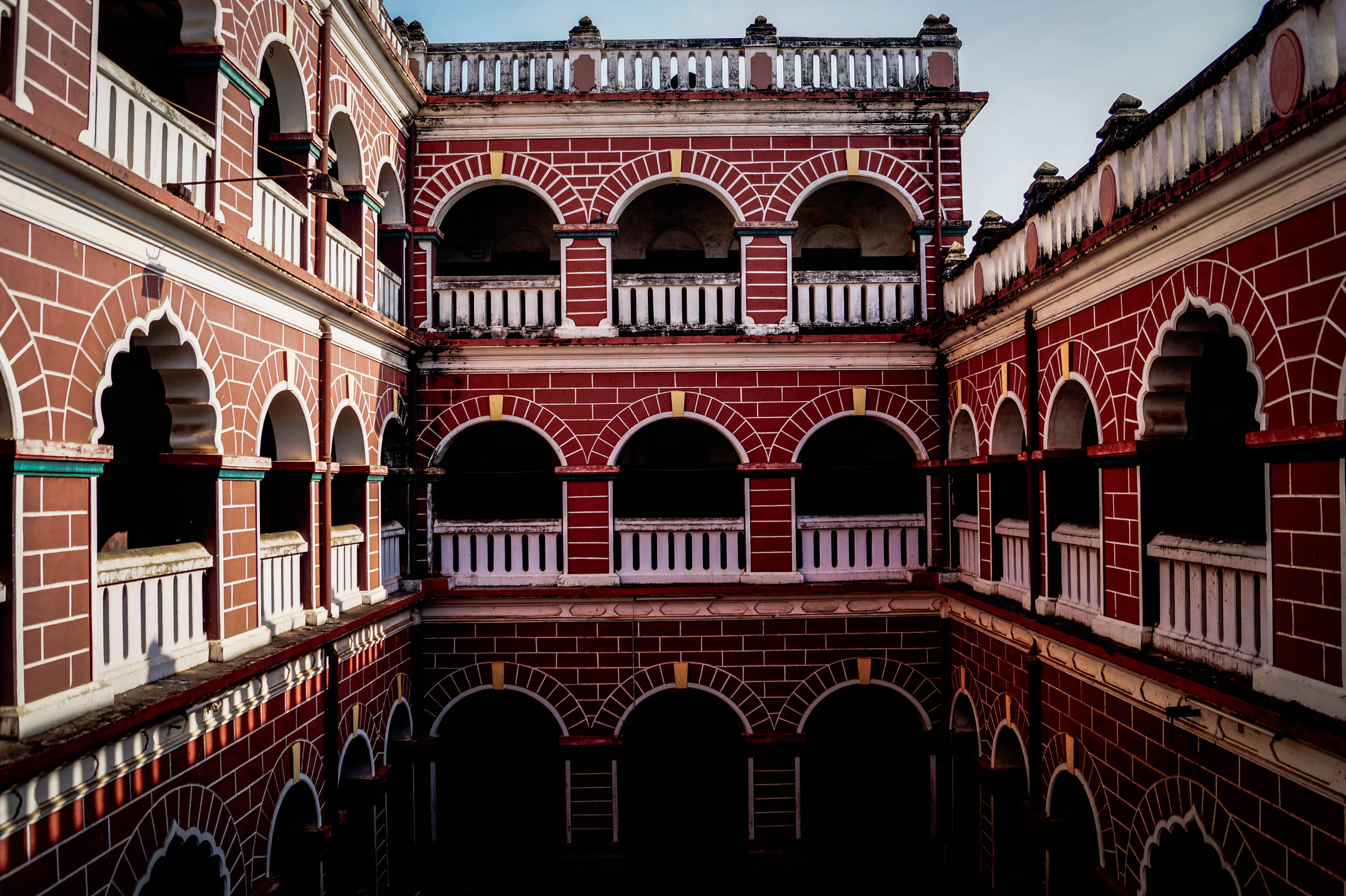
- City Skyline Udayagiri Caves Rajarani Temple Lingaraja Temple Kalinga Stadium Parsurameswara Temple Mukteshvara Temple Dharmashala, Ekamra Kshetra, Old town
- Nicknames: City of Temples, Chakra Kshetra, Sports Capital of India
- Interactive map of Bhubaneswar
- Location in Odisha, India Bhubaneswar (India) Bhubaneswar (Asia)
- Coordinates: 20.27°N 85.84°E
- Country: India
- State: Odisha
- District: Khordha
- Capital established: 13 April 1948
- Founder: Government of Odisha

Government
  - Type: Municipal Corporation
  - Body: Bhubaneswar Municipal Corporation (BMC)
  - Mayor: Sulochana Das, (BJD)
  - Municipal Commissioner: Chanchal Rana, IAS

Area
  - Metropolis: 186 km^{2} (72 sq mi)
  - Rank: 1st (Odisha)
- Elevation: 45 m (148 ft)

Population (2011)
  - Metropolis: 837,737
  - Density: 4,500/km^{2} (11,700/sq mi)
  - Metro: 1,289,000
- Demonym(s): Bhubaneswarite; Bhubaneswariya

Languages
  - Official: Odia, English
- Time zone: UTC+5:30 (IST)
- PIN: 751*** and 752***; 751001 (GPO, Secretariat); 751003 (Unit III); 751012 (Nayapalli); 751016 (Chandrasekharpur); 751024 (KIIT); 751030 (Khandagiri)
- Telephone code: 0674
- Vehicle registration: OD-02 (South); OD-33 (North)
- UN/LOCODE: IN BBI
- Rapid Transit: Bhubaneswar Metro (On hold)
- GDP per capita (2020): US$8,273 (equivalent to $10,292 in 2025)
- Airport: Biju Patnaik International Airport
- Website: bmc.gov.in

Bhubaneswar (/bʊbəˈneɪswəɹ/; Odia: [ˈbʱubɔneswɔɾɔ]), also known as Bhubaneswara, is the capital and the largest city of the Indian state of Odisha. It is located in the Khordha district. The suburban region, especially the old town, was historically often depicted as Chakra Khetra and Ekamra Khetra (Area adorned with a mango tree). Bhubaneswar is dubbed the "Temple City", a nickname earned because of many temples which are standing there. In contemporary times, the city is a hub of sports, tourism and IT in the country. Although the modern city of Bhubaneswar was formally established in 1948, the history of the areas in and around the present-day city can be traced to the 1st century BCE. It is a confluence of Hindu, Buddhist and Jain heritage and includes several Kalingan temples, many of them from 6th–13th century CE. With Puri and Konark, it forms the "Swarna Tribhuja" (lit. 'Golden Triangle'), one of Eastern India's most visited destinations.

Bhubaneswar replaced Cuttack as the capital of Odisha on 13 April 1948. The modern city was designed by the German architect, Otto Königsberger, in 1946. Along with Jamshedpur and Chandigarh, it was one of modern India's first planned cities. Bhubaneswar and Cuttack are often referred to as the 'twin cities of Odisha'. The area formed by the two cities had a population of 1.7 million in 2011. It is categorised as a Tier-2 city. Bhubaneswar and Rourkela are the two cities in smart city mission from Odisha.

== Etymology ==
Bhubaneswar is the anglicisation of the pronunciation of Odia name "Bhubanēśwara" (ଭୁବନେଶ୍ୱର), derived from the word Tribhubanēśwara (ତ୍ରିଭୁବନେଶ୍ୱର), which literally means "the Lord" (Īśvara) "of the Three Worlds" (Tribhuvana), which in this context refers to Shiva.

== History ==
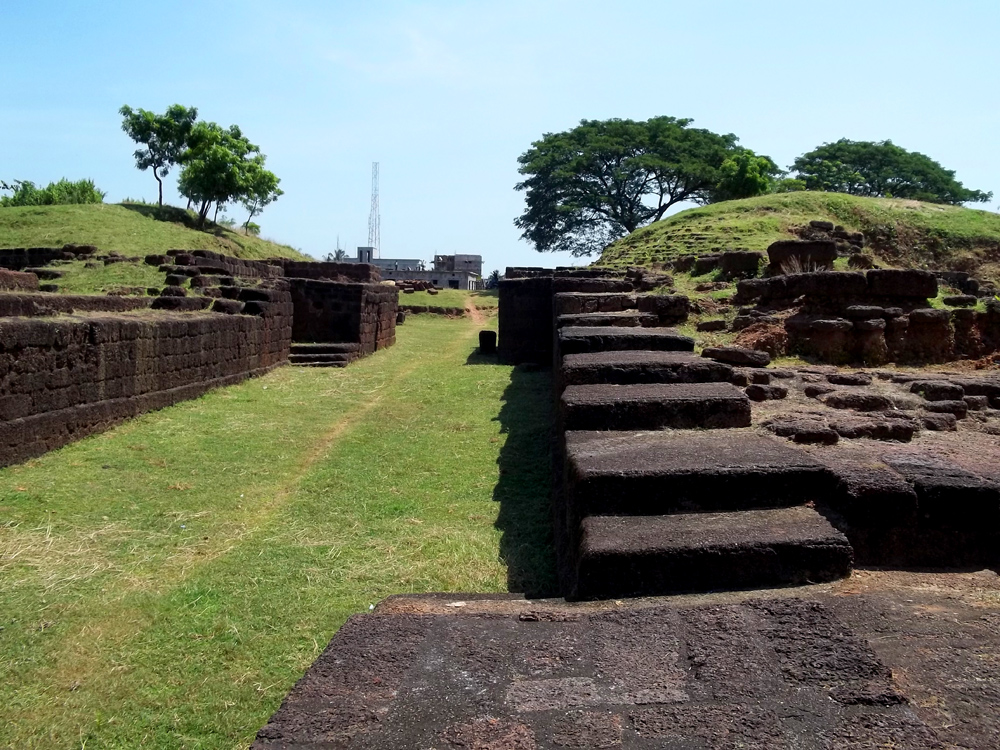
Remains of the ancient city of Sisupalgarh, on the outskirts of Bhubaneswar, dated to the 7th century BCE

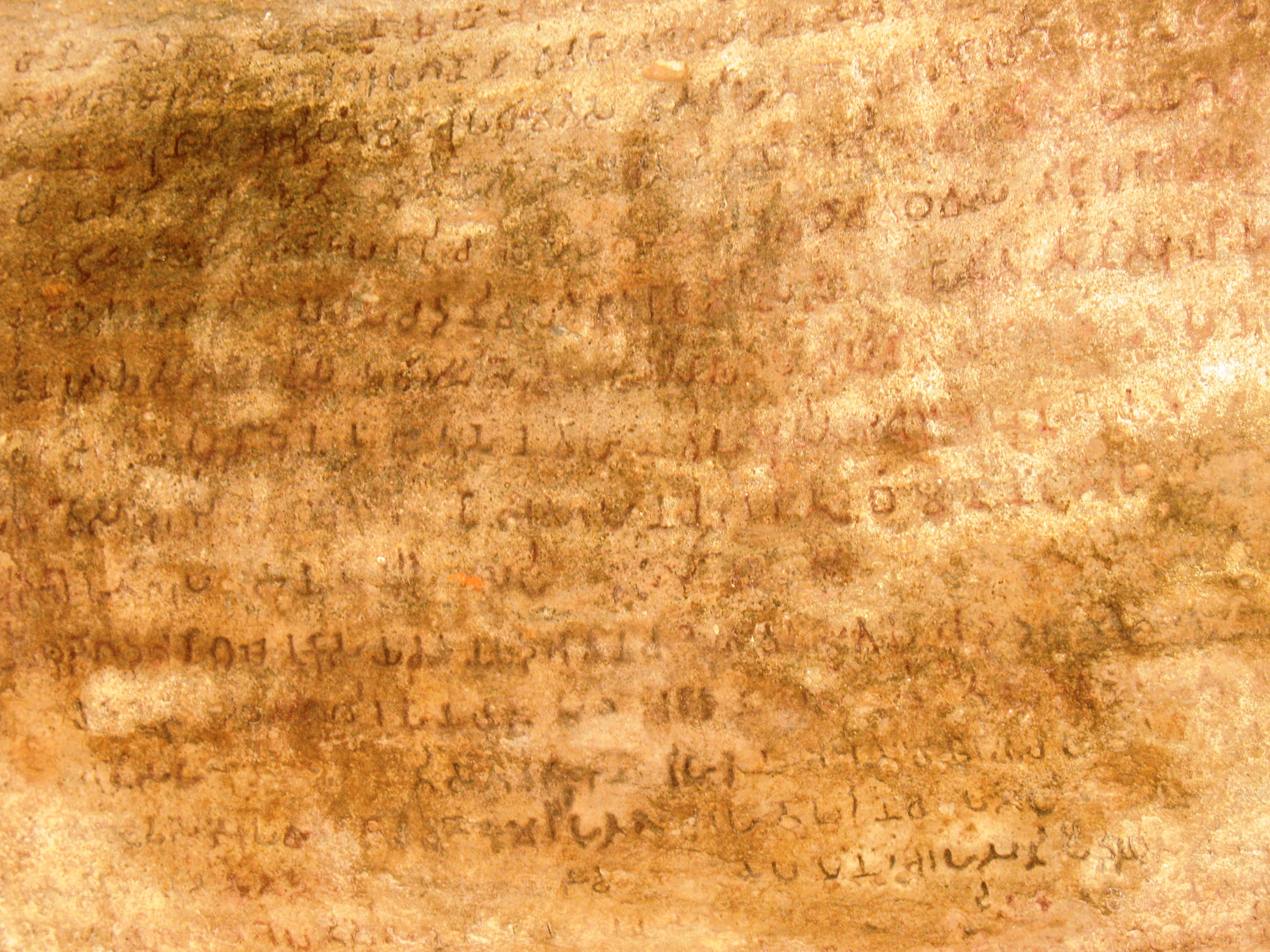
Hathigumpha inscription at the Udayagiri and Khandagiri caves near Bhubaneswar

Bhubaneswar stands near the ruins of Sisupalgarh. Dhauli, near Bhubaneswar was the site of the Kalinga War (c. 262-261 BCE), in which the Mauryan emperor Ashoka invaded and annexed Kalinga. One of the most complete edicts of the Mauryan Emperor, Ashoka, dating from between 272 and 236 BCE, remains carved in rock, 8 kilometres (5.0 mi) to the southwest of the modern city. After the decline of the Mauryan empire, the area came under the rule of Mahameghavahana dynasty, whose most well-known ruler is Kharavela. His Hathigumpha inscription is located at the Udayagiri and Khandagiri caves near Bhubaneswar. The area was subsequently ruled by several dynasties, including Satavahanas, Guptas, Matharas, and Shailodbhavas.

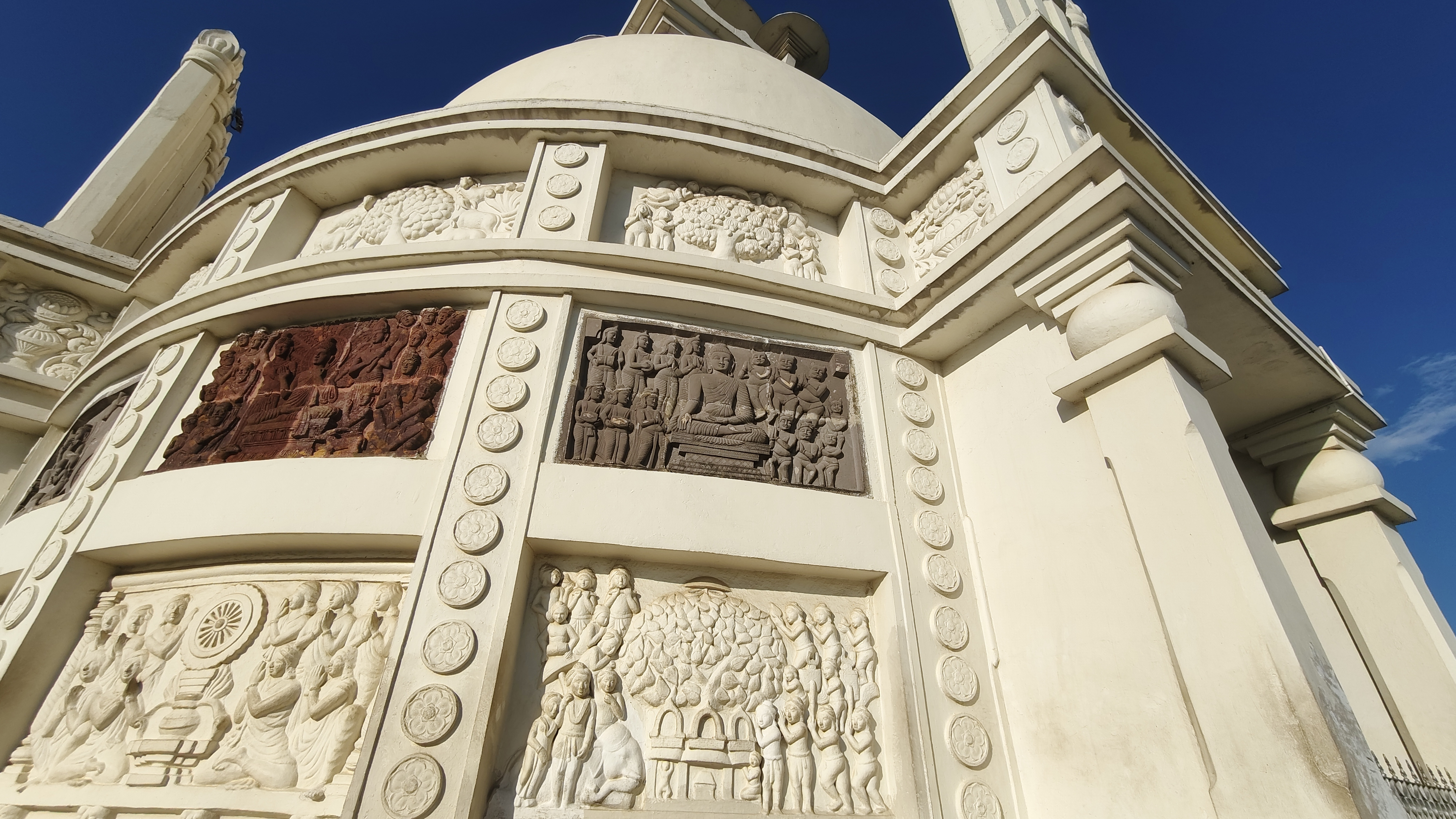
Historical landmark in Dhauli Shanti Stupa

In the 7th century, Somavamshi or Keshari dynasty established their kingdom and constructed a number of temples. After the Kesharis, the Eastern Gangas ruled Kalinga area until the 14th century CE. Their capital was located in present-day Cuttack City. After them, Mukunda Deva of the Bhoi Dynasty – the last Hindu ruler of the area until the Marathas ruled Odisha from Cuttack. Most of the older temples in Bhubaneswar were built between 8th and 12th centuries, under Shaiva influence. The Ananta Vasudeva Temple is the only old temple of Vishnu in the city. In 1568, the Karrani dynasty of Afghan origin gained control of Odisha. During their reign, most of the temples and other structures were destroyed or disfigured.

In the 16th century, the area came under pachamani Mughal control. The Marathas, who succeeded the Mughals in the mid-18th century, encouraged pilgrimage in Odisha. In 1803, the area came under British colonial rule and was part of the Bengal Presidency (until 1912), Bihar and Orissa Province (1912–1936) and Orissa Province (1936–1947).

=== Contemporary history ===
The capital of the British-ruled and post-independent Orissa State was also Cuttack, which was vulnerable to floods and suffered from space constraints. Because of this, in September 1946, a proposal to move the capital to a new capital was introduced in the Legislative Assembly of the Odisha Province. After independence of India, the foundation of the new capital was laid on 13 April 1948. The Legislative Assembly of Odisha was shifted from Cuttack to Bhubaneswar in 1949. Bhubaneswar was built as a modern city, designed by German architect Otto Königsberger with wide roads, gardens and parks. Though part of the city followed the plan, it grew rapidly over the next few decades, outstripping the planning process. According to the first census of independent India, taken in 1951, the town's population was just 16,000. From 1952 to 1979, it was administered by a Notified Area Council or a nagar panchayat; a municipality was established only on 12 March 1979. During this time, due to fear of wild animals and forested areas, Cuttack continued to be the people's favourite destination. The government officials lived at Cuttack and came to Bhubaneswar for work. The government then forced the officials to live at Bhubaneswar. Then some traders came to set up some shops. By the 1991 census, the population of Bhubaneswar had increased to 411,542. Accordingly, on 14 August 1994, the Bhubaneswar Municipal Corporation was established.

== Geography ==
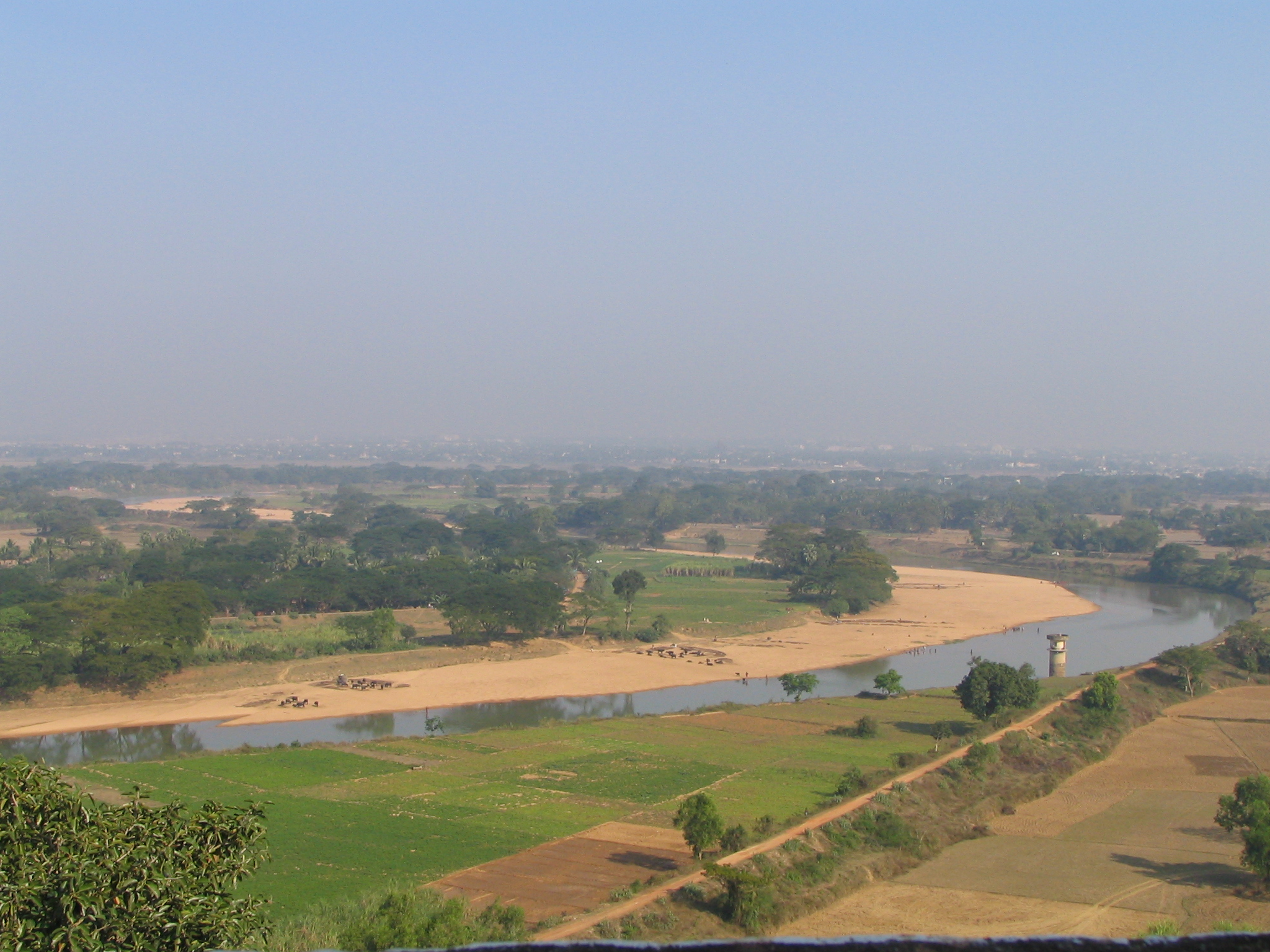
Daya River at the foothills of Dhauli

Bhubaneswar is in Khordha district of Odisha. It is in the eastern coastal plains, along the axis of the Eastern Ghats mountains. The city has an average altitude of 45 m (148 ft) above sea level. Bhubaneswar lies in Mahanadi River Delta. The Daya River is 4 km to the south and the Kuakhai River 4 km to the east; the Chandaka Wildlife Sanctuary and Nandankanan Zoo are in west and north to Bhubaneswar, respectively.

Bhubaneswar is topographically divided into western uplands and eastern lowlands, with hillocks in the western and northern parts. Kanjia lake on the northern outskirts, affords rich biodiversity and is a wetland of national importance. Bhubaneswar's soils are 65% laterite, 25% alluvial and 10 % sandstone. The Bureau of Indian Standards places the city inside seismic zone III, on a scale ranging from I to V in order of increasing susceptibility to earthquakes. The United Nations Development Programme reports that there is "very high damage risk" from winds and cyclones. The 1999 Odisha cyclone caused major damage to buildings, the city's infrastructure and cost many human lives. Floods and waterlogging in the low-lying areas have become common due to unplanned growth.

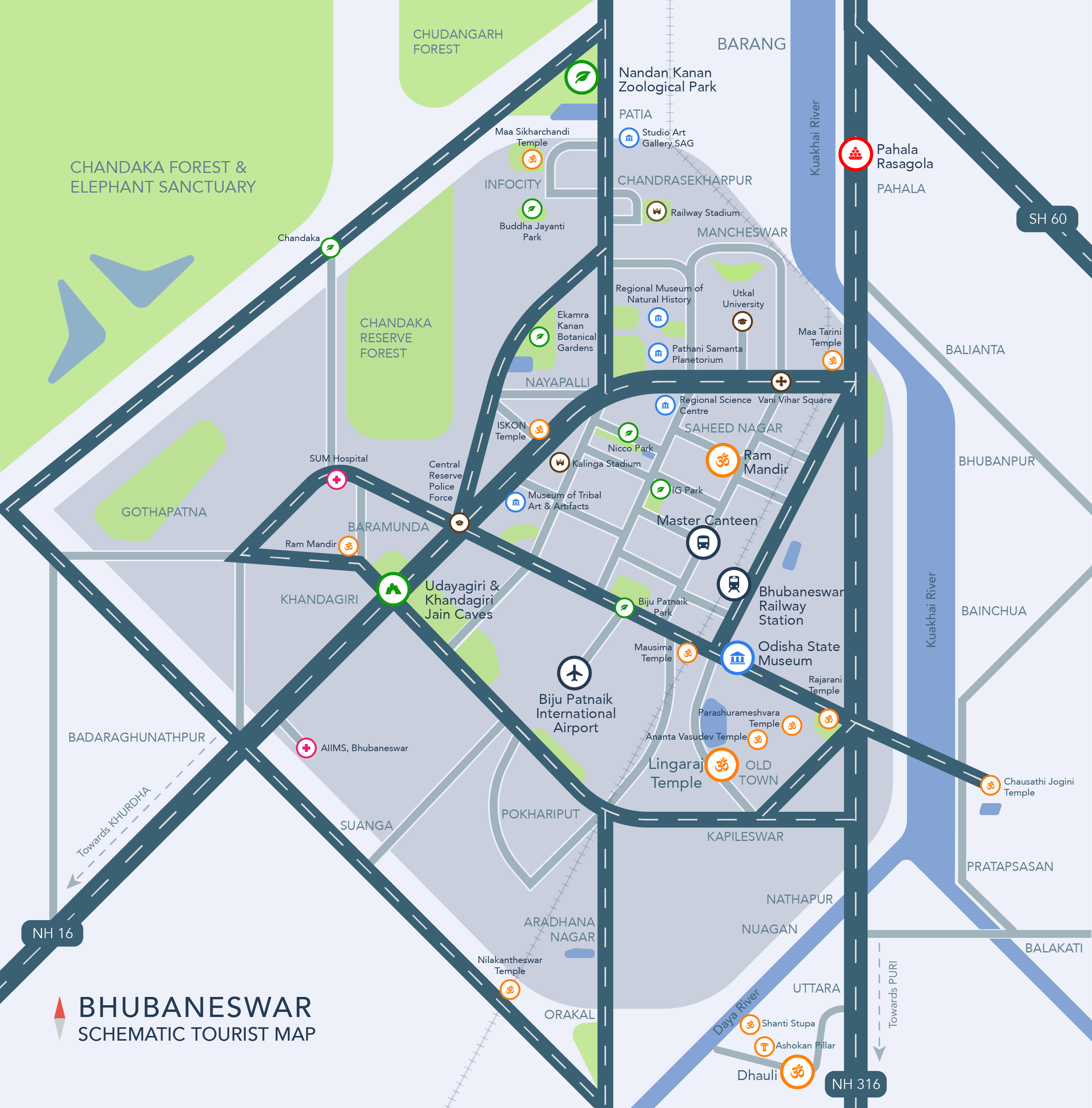
Bhubaneswar schematic tourist map

=== Urban structure ===
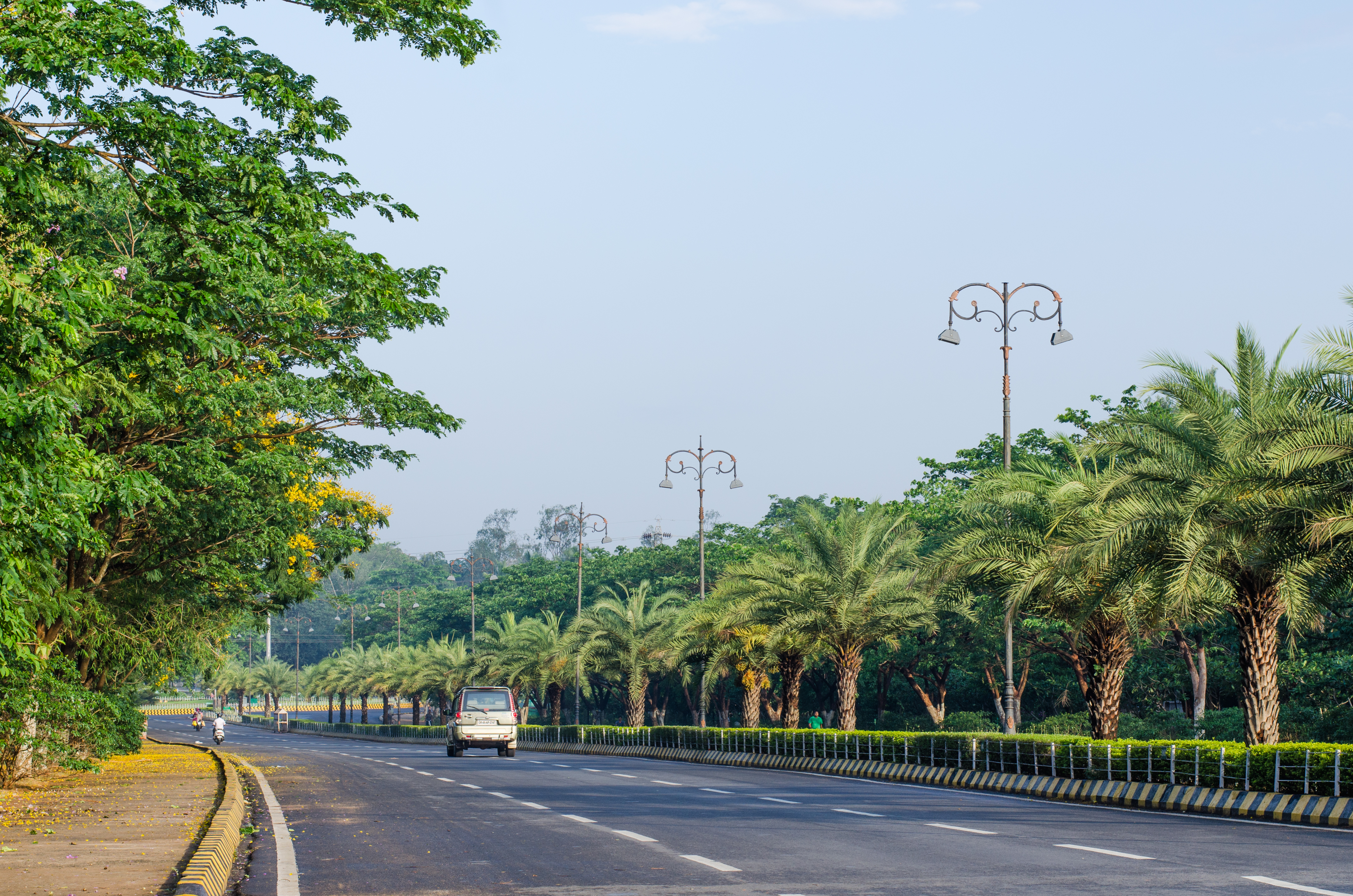
Rajpath, Bhubaneswar

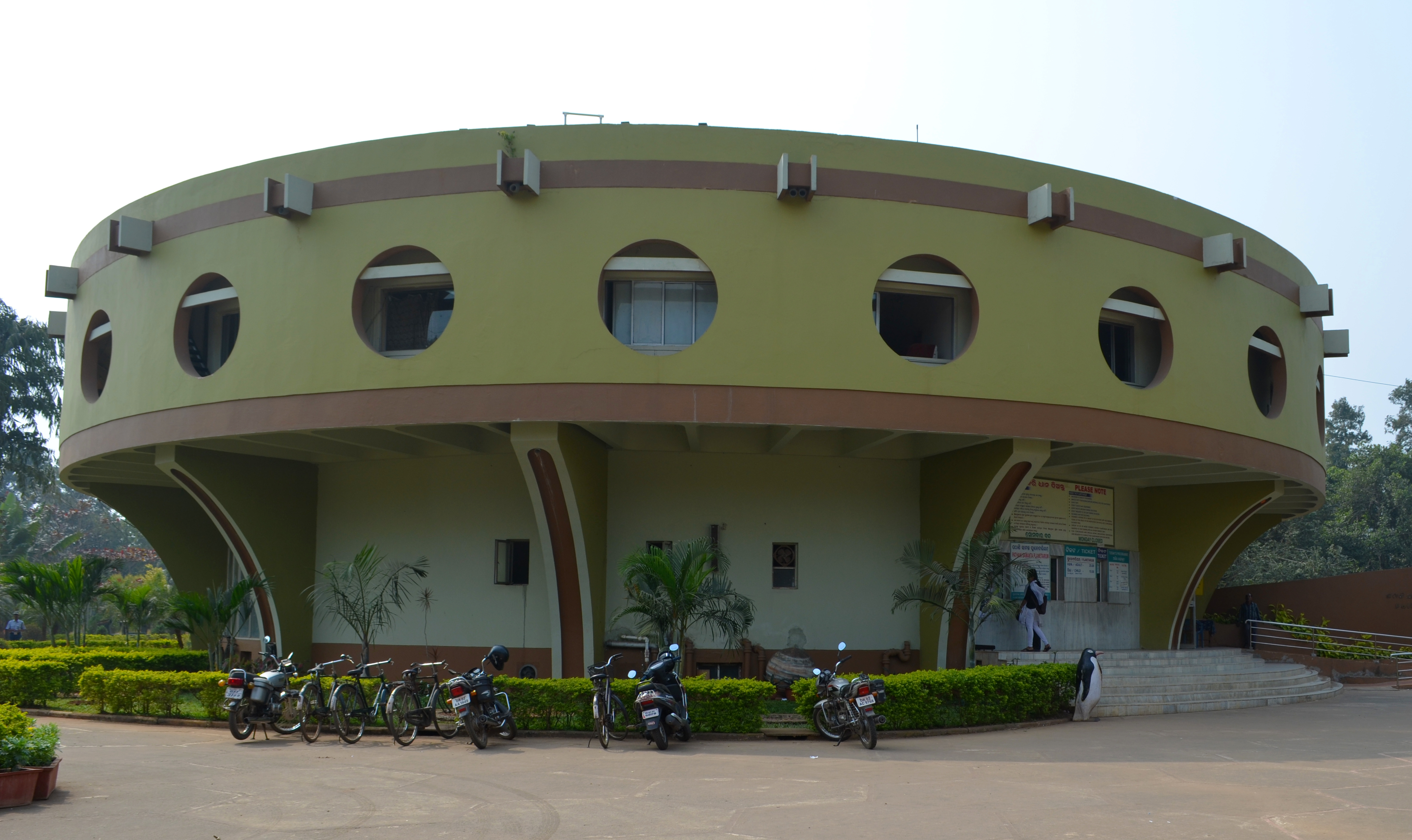
Pathani Samanta Planetarium Bhubaneswar

The Bhubaneswar urban development area consists of the Bhubaneswar Municipal Corporation area, 173 revenue villages and two other municipalities spread over 1,110 km^{2} (430 sq mi). The area under the jurisdiction of the Bhubaneswar Municipal Corporation covers 186 square kilometres (72 sq mi). The city is somewhat dumbbell-shaped with most of the growth taking place to the north, northeast and southwest. The north–south axis of the city is widest, at roughly 22.5 kilometres (14.0 mi). Growth in the east is restricted due to the presence of Kuakhai River and by the wildlife sanctuary in the northwestern part. The city can be broadly divided into the old town, planned city (or state capital), added areas and into Units and Colonies.

The old town or "Temple Town", the oldest part of the city, is characterised by many temples, including the Lingaraja, Nilakantha Siva, Rajarani and Muktesvara temples, standing alongside residential areas. Additional structures include the Somabaresvara Siva Temple and the Kartikesvara Siva Temple. The area is congested, with narrow roads and poor infrastructure. Among neighbourhoods in the old town are Rajarani Colony, Pandaba Nagar, Brahmeswara Bagh, Lingaraja Nagar, Gouri Nagar, Bhimatangi, Kapilaprasad and Sundarpada.

The planned city was designed in 1948 to house the capital. It is subdivided into units, each with a high school, shopping centres, dispensaries and play areas. While most of the units house government employees, Unit V houses the administrative buildings, including the State Secretariat, State Assembly and the Raj Bhavan. Private residential areas were later built in other areas of the planned city, including Saheed Nagar and Satya Nagar. Unit I, popularly known as the Market Building, was formed to cater to the shopping needs of the new capital's residents. Later, markets and commercial establishments developed along the Janpath and Cuttack-Puri Road at Saheed Nagar, Satya Nagar, Bapuji Nagar and Ashok Nagar. A dedicated institutional area houses educational and research institutes, including Utkal University, the Institute of Physics, the Institute of Minerals and Materials Technology and Sainik School. Indira Gandhi Park, Gandhi Park and the Biju Patnaik Park are located in the unit.

The added areas are mostly areas lying north of National Highway 5, including Nayapalli, Jayadev Vihar, Chandrasekharpur and Sailashree Vihar, Niladri vihar which were developed by Bhubaneswar Development Authority to house the growing population. With the development of the new areas such as Chandrasekharpur, the city is now divided roughly into North (newer areas) and South Bhubaneswar (older areas) by the NH-5 highway.

The peripheral areas are outside the municipal boundary or have subsequently been included within the extended boundary, including Tomando, Patia and Raghunathpur. Most of these areas were developed in a haphazard manner, without proper planning. The Master Planning Branch of the Bhubaneswar Development Authority developed the Comprehensive Development Plan (CDP) in 2010. According to the Odisha Development Authorities Act, 1982, the Development Authority has control over the planning for municipal areas. Apart from the CDP, BDA has also created Zonal Development Plans for some of the areas under the CDP. Bhubaneswar secured the top rank in the Smart city list in India.

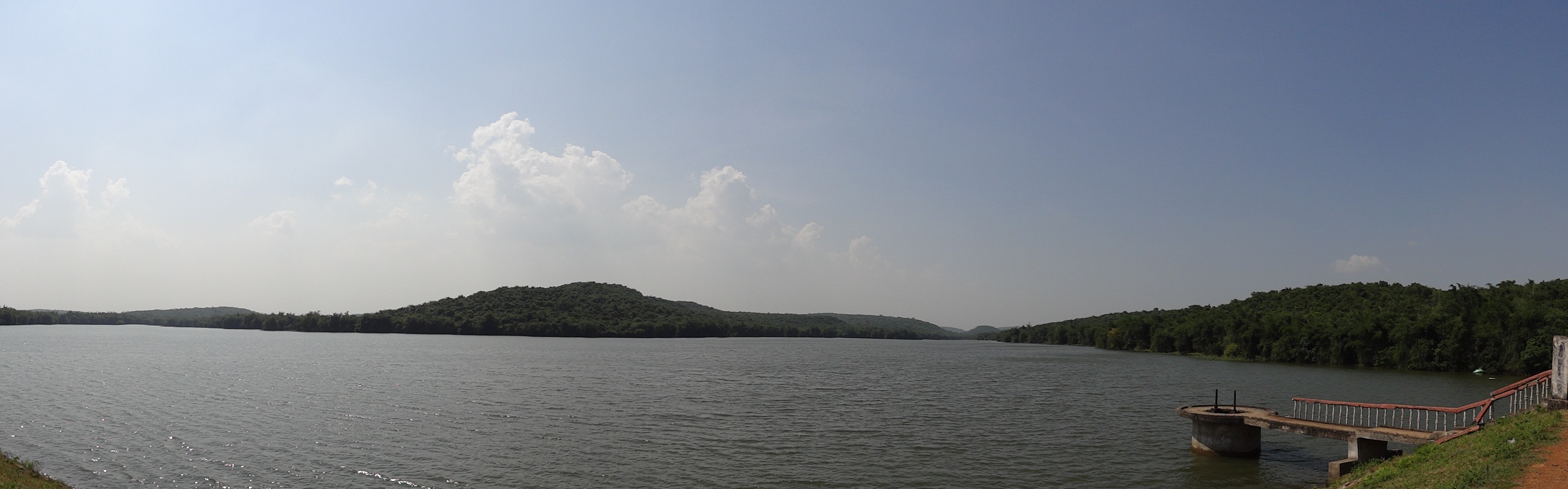
Deras Dam

=== Climate ===
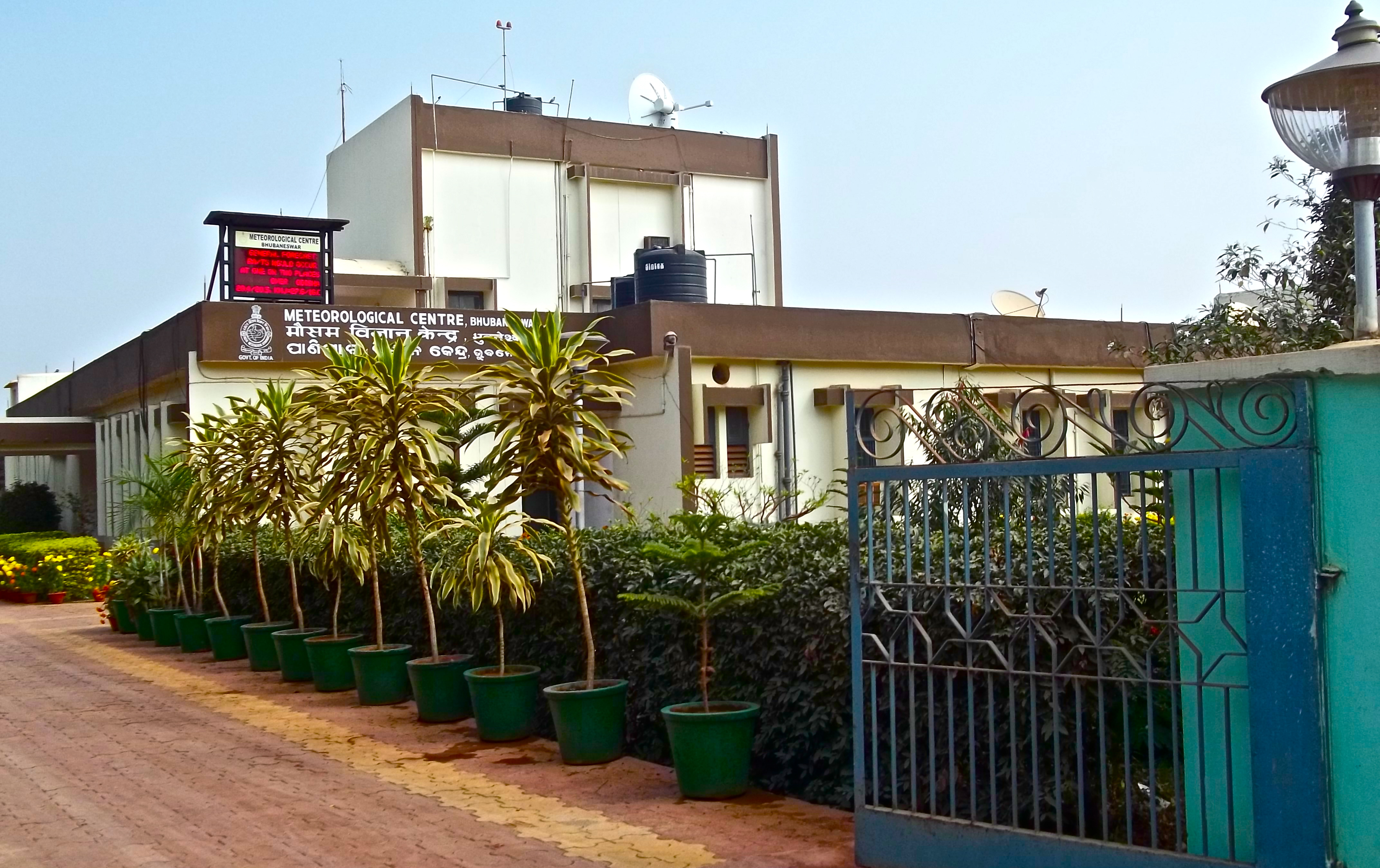
Meteorological Centre, Bhubaneswar

Bhubaneswar has a tropical savanna climate, designated Aw under the Köppen climate classification. Temperatures in Bhubaneswar usually range from 11 to 44 °C (52 to 111 °F). It experiences five primary seasons: winter (December to January), when temperatures can drop to 11 °C (52 °F); spring (February); summer (March to May), when temperatures can reach 44 °C (111 °F) or higher; monsoon (June to October); and post-monsoon (November). The annual mean temperature is 27.4 °C (81.3 °F); monthly mean temperatures are 22–32 °C (72–90 °F). Summers (March to June) are hot and humid, with temperatures in the low 30s C; during dry spells, maximum temperatures often exceed 40 °C (104 °F) in May and June. Winter lasts for only about ten weeks, with seasonal lows dipping to 15–18 °C (59–64 °F) in December and January. May is the hottest month, when daily temperatures range from 32–42 °C (90–108 °F). January, the coldest month, has temperatures varying from 15–28 °C (59–82 °F). The highest and lowest temperatures ever recorded in Bhubaneswar are 46.7 °C (116.1 °F) on 5 June 2012 and 8.2 °C (46.8 °F) on 30 December 2018. The official weather station for the city is the Biju Patnaik Airport. Weather records here date back to 1 July 1948.

Rains brought by the Bay of Bengal branch of the south west summer monsoon lash Bhubaneswar between June and September, supplying it with most of its annual rainfall of 1,657.8 mm (65 in). The highest monthly rainfall total, 374.6 mm (15 in), occurs in August.

Climate data for Bhubaneswar (Biju Patnaik International Airport) 1991–2020, extremes 1952–present
Month	Jan	Feb	Mar	Apr	May	Jun	Jul	Aug	Sep	Oct	Nov	Dec	Year
Record high °C (°F)	35.8 (96.4)	42.7 (108.9)	44.2 (111.6)	45.8 (114.4)	46.5 (115.7)	46.7 (116.1)	41.3 (106.3)	37.4 (99.3)	37.9 (100.2)	36.6 (97.9)	37.6 (99.7)	33.6 (92.5)	46.7 (116.1)
Mean maximum °C (°F)	32.8 (91.0)	37.0 (98.6)	39.8 (103.6)	41.2 (106.2)	42.4 (108.3)	40.9 (105.6)	36.3 (97.3)	35.1 (95.2)	35.3 (95.5)	34.4 (93.9)	33.2 (91.8)	32.0 (89.6)	43.6 (110.5)
Mean daily maximum °C (°F)	29.2 (84.6)	32.5 (90.5)	35.9 (96.6)	37.7 (99.9)	37.7 (99.9)	35.3 (95.5)	32.4 (90.3)	32.0 (89.6)	32.4 (90.3)	31.9 (89.4)	30.8 (87.4)	28.9 (84.0)	33.0 (91.4)
Daily mean °C (°F)	22.2 (72.0)	25.6 (78.1)	29.2 (84.6)	31.4 (88.5)	32.0 (89.6)	30.7 (87.3)	29.0 (84.2)	28.6 (83.5)	28.8 (83.8)	27.7 (81.9)	25.1 (77.2)	22.2 (72.0)	27.7 (81.9)
Mean daily minimum °C (°F)	15.5 (59.9)	18.5 (65.3)	22.8 (73.0)	25.3 (77.5)	26.7 (80.1)	26.4 (79.5)	25.6 (78.1)	25.4 (77.7)	25.2 (77.4)	23.4 (74.1)	19.3 (66.7)	15.4 (59.7)	22.4 (72.3)
Mean minimum °C (°F)	11.4 (52.5)	14.1 (57.4)	18.6 (65.5)	21.1 (70.0)	21.7 (71.1)	23.0 (73.4)	23.3 (73.9)	23.5 (74.3)	23.1 (73.6)	19.7 (67.5)	15.1 (59.2)	11.6 (52.9)	10.7 (51.3)
Record low °C (°F)	8.6 (47.5)	9.6 (49.3)	14.6 (58.3)	17.0 (62.6)	15.0 (59.0)	16.8 (62.2)	20.0 (68.0)	18.4 (65.1)	18.5 (65.3)	16.1 (61.0)	9.7 (49.5)	8.2 (46.8)	8.2 (46.8)
Average rainfall mm (inches)	13.1 (0.52)	21.1 (0.83)	20.6 (0.81)	40.4 (1.59)	101.6 (4.00)	208.5 (8.21)	359.7 (14.16)	374.6 (14.75)	281.7 (11.09)	201.2 (7.92)	30.3 (1.19)	4.9 (0.19)	1,657.8 (65.27)
Average rainy days	0.8	1.1	1.4	2.2	4.5	9.9	15.0	15.6	12.7	7.9	1.5	0.4	73.0
Average relative humidity (%) (at 17:30 IST)	55	52	58	64	67	75	85	86	85	80	69	60	70
Mean monthly sunshine hours	253.4	234.0	237.8	238.8	242.9	140.7	107.2	128.6	150.8	221.8	217.5	255.0	2,428.5
Source 1: India Meteorological Department
Source 2: NOAA (sun, 1971–1990), Tokyo Climate Center (mean temperatures 1991–2020)

Bhubaneswar has been ranked 7th best “National Clean Air City” under (Category 2 3-10L Population cities) in India according to 'Swachh Vayu Survekshan 2024 Results'

== Economy ==
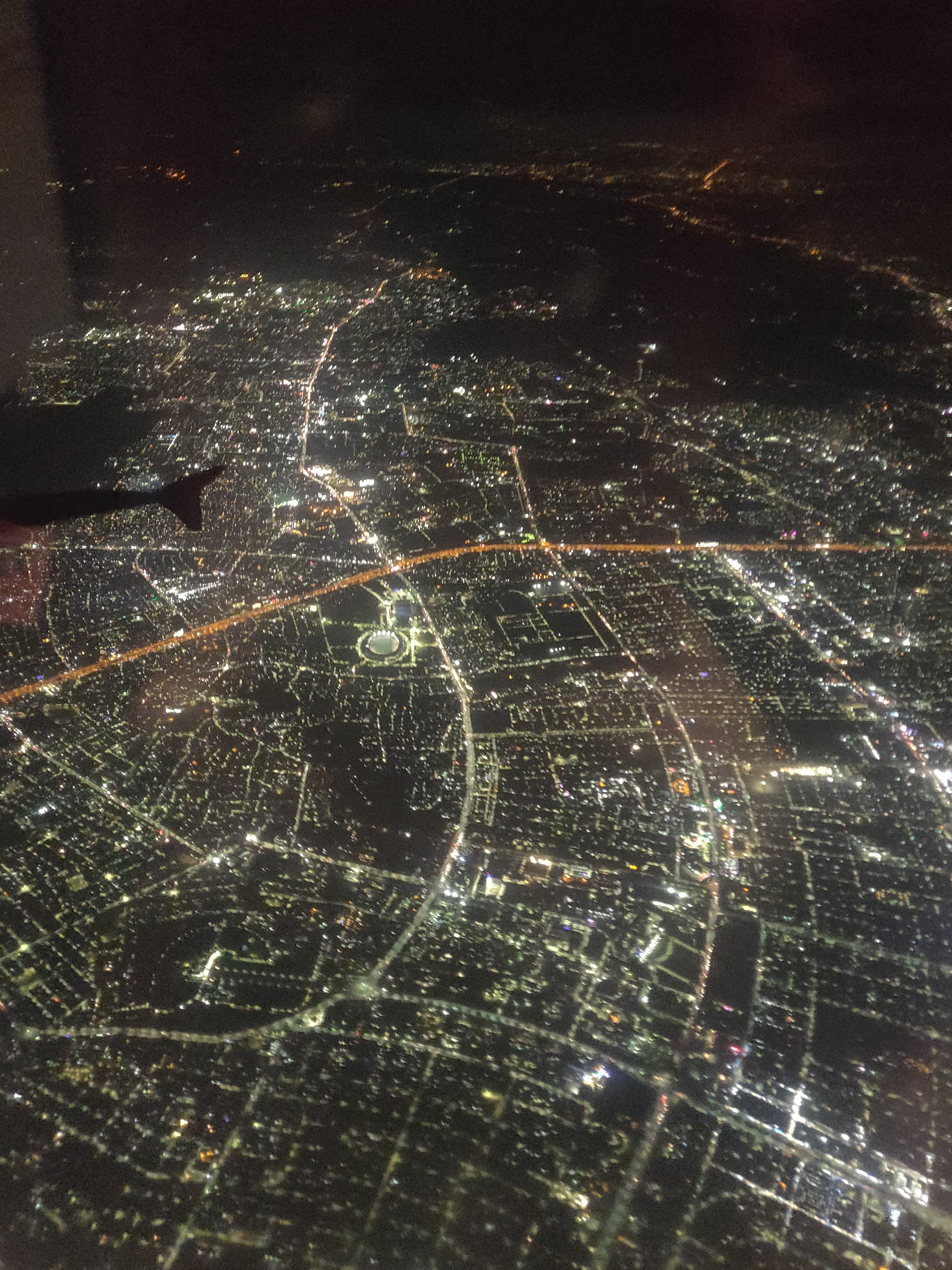
Aerial Night view of Bhubaneswar

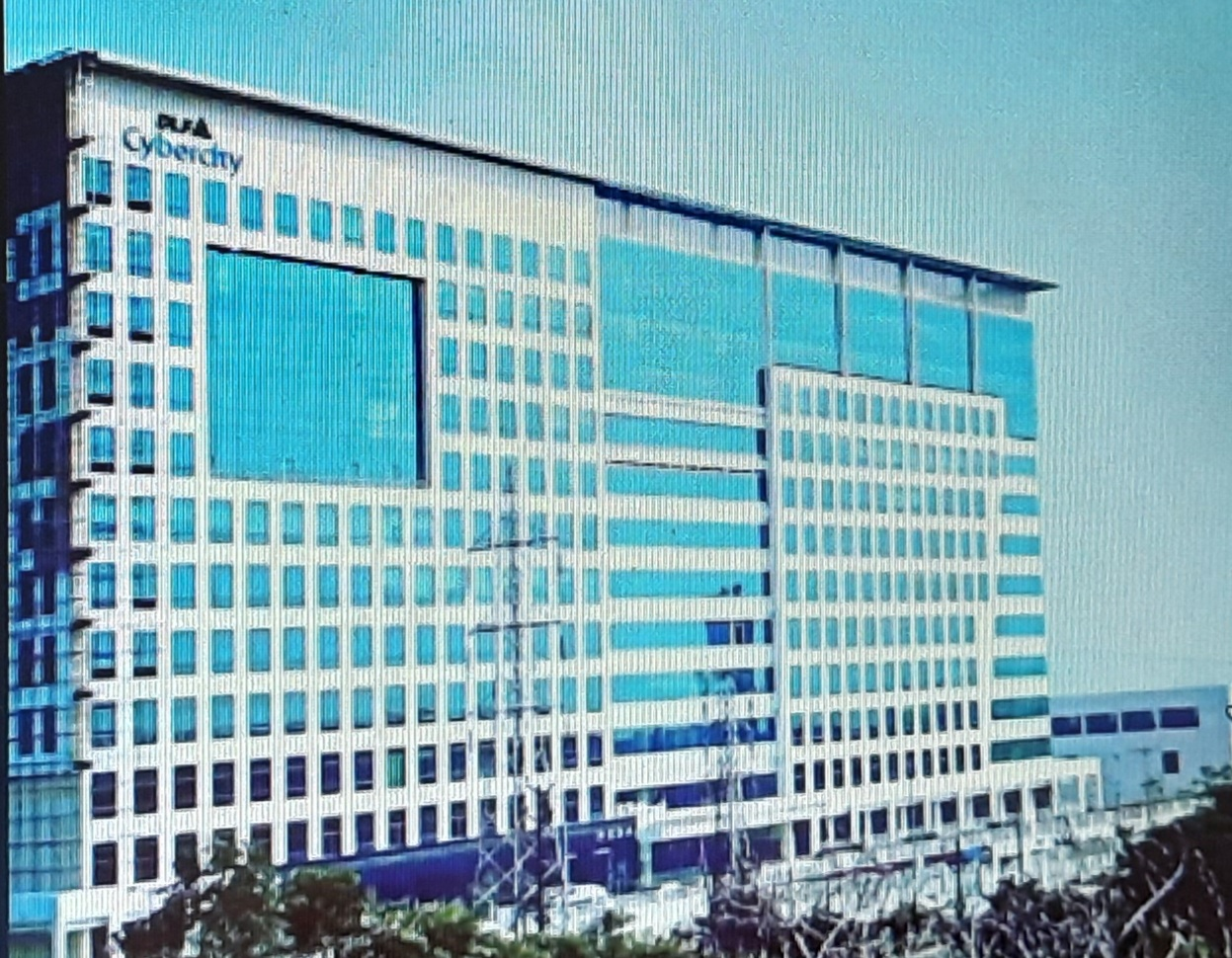
DLF Cyber City Bhubaneswar

Bhubaneswar is an administrative, information technology, education and tourism city. Bhubaneswar was ranked as the best place to do business in India by the World Bank in 2014. Bhubaneswar has emerged as one of the fast-growing, important trading and commercial hub in the state and eastern India. Tourism is a major industry, attracting about 1.5 million tourists in 2011. Bhubaneswar was designed to be a largely residential city with outlying industrial areas. The economy had few major players until the 1990s and was dominated by retail and small-scale manufacturing. With the economic liberalisation policy adopted by the Government of India in the 1990s, Bhubaneswar received investment in telecommunications, information technology (IT) and higher education.

In 2011, according to a study by Associated Chambers of Commerce and Industry of India, Bhubaneswar had the highest rate of employment growth among 17 Tier-2 cities in India. It has been listed among the top ten emerging cities in India by Cushman and Wakefield, taking into consideration factors like demographics, physical, social and real estate infrastructure, current level and scope of economic activities and government support. In 2012, Bhubaneswar was ranked third among Indian cities, in starting and operating a business by the World Bank. Bhubaneswar has been traditionally home to handicrafts industry, including silver filigree work, appliqué work, stone and wood carvings and patta painting, which significantly contributes to the city's economy. The late 2000s saw a surge of investments in the real estate, infrastructure, retail and hospitality sectors; several shopping malls and organised retails opened outlets in Bhubaneswar. In the informal sector, 22,000 vendors operate in regulated or unregulated vending zones.

As of 2001, around 2.15% of the city's workforce was employed in the primary sector (agriculture, forestry, mining, etc.); 2.18% worked in the secondary sector (industrial and manufacturing); and 95.67% worked in the tertiary sector (service industries).

The Department of Industries established four industrial areas in and around Bhubaneswar, in the Rasulgarh, Mancheswar, Chandaka, and Bhagabanpur areas. The industrial sector in Bhubaneswar includes paper, steel, automobile, food, pharma and electronics industries. A large number of companies including Odisha State Cooperative Milk Producers' Federation, Bharat Biotech, Topaz Solar, Britannia Industries, SMS Group and Jockey International have manufacturing facilities in the city.

In 2009, Odisha was ranked ninth among Indian states in terms of software export by NASSCOM, with most IT/ITES companies established in Bhubaneswar. In 2011–12, Odisha had a growth rate of 17% for software exports. According to a 2012 survey, among the tier-2 cities in India, Bhubaneswar was considered the best for conducting IT/ITES business. The government fostered growth by developing of IT parks such as Infocity-1, Infovalley, STPI-Bhubaneswar and JSS STP. Infocity was conceived as a five-star park, under the Export Promotion Industrial Parks (EPIP) Scheme to create infrastructure facilities for setting up information technology-related industries. Infosys and Tech Mahindra have been present in Bhubaneswar since 1996. Other Multinational Companies include Accenture, Cognizant, Tata Consultancy Services, Wipro, IBM, Genpact, Firstsource, Mindtree, MphasiS, Ericsson, Semtech, Reliance Communications, PricewaterhouseCoopers, Bharti Airtel, DLF (company), Capgemini, Happiest Minds, Concentrix, RiR Electronics, Synopsys, Lyfsoft, EY and Deloitte. It also houses the headquarters of POSCO India, a subsidiary of South Korean conglomerate POSCO and Govt. of India owned National Aluminium Company(NALCO). Apart from the big multinationals, some 300 small and mid-size IT companies and business startups have offices in Bhubaneswar.

Lulu International Shopping Malls Private Limited plans to set up shopping malls, hypermarkets, agri sourcing and logistics hub with an investment of Rs 1,500 crore.

== Demographics ==
=== Population ===
Historical population
Year	Pop.	±%
1951	16,512	—
1961	38,211	+131.4%
1971	105,491	+176.1%
1981	227,525	+115.7%
1991	423,465	+86.1%
2001	647,302	+52.9%
2011	837,737	+29.4%
2024	2,037,000	+143.2%

As per the 2011 census of India, Bhubaneswar had a population of 837,737, while the metropolitan area had a population of 881,988. As per the estimate of IIT Kharagpur, which made a development plan, the Bhubaneswar–Cuttack Urban complex, consisting of 721.9 square kilometres (278.7 sq mi), has a population of 1.9 million (as of 2008). As of 2011, the number of males was 445,233, while the number of females were 392,504. The decadal growth rate was 45.90%.

=== Literacy ===
Effective male literacy was 95.69%, while female literacy was 90.26%. About 75,237 were under six. Bhubaneswar's literacy rate is 93.15%—significantly higher than the national average of 74.04%.

=== Language ===
Languages spoken in Bhubaneswar (2011)
1. Odia (88.4%)
2. Hindi (2.98%)
3. Telugu (2.81%)
4. Bengali (2.01%)
5. Urdu (1.83%)
6. Santali (0.82%)
7. Others (1.12%)

The main language spoken in the city is Odia. However, English and Hindi are understood by most residents. Although Odias comprise the vast majority, migrants from other states like Andhra Pradesh, Bihar, West Bengal, Rajasthan and Jharkhand also dwell in the city. Growth in the information technology industry and education sector in Bhubaneswar changed the city's demographic profile; likely infrastructure strains and haphazard growth from demographic changes have been a cause of concern.

=== Religion ===
Religion in Bhubaneshwar
1. Hindus (95.2%)
2. Muslims (3.29%)
3. Christians (0.92%)
4. Sikhs (0.12%)
5. Others^{[^]} (0.43%)
Others includes Jain, Buddhists and not stated

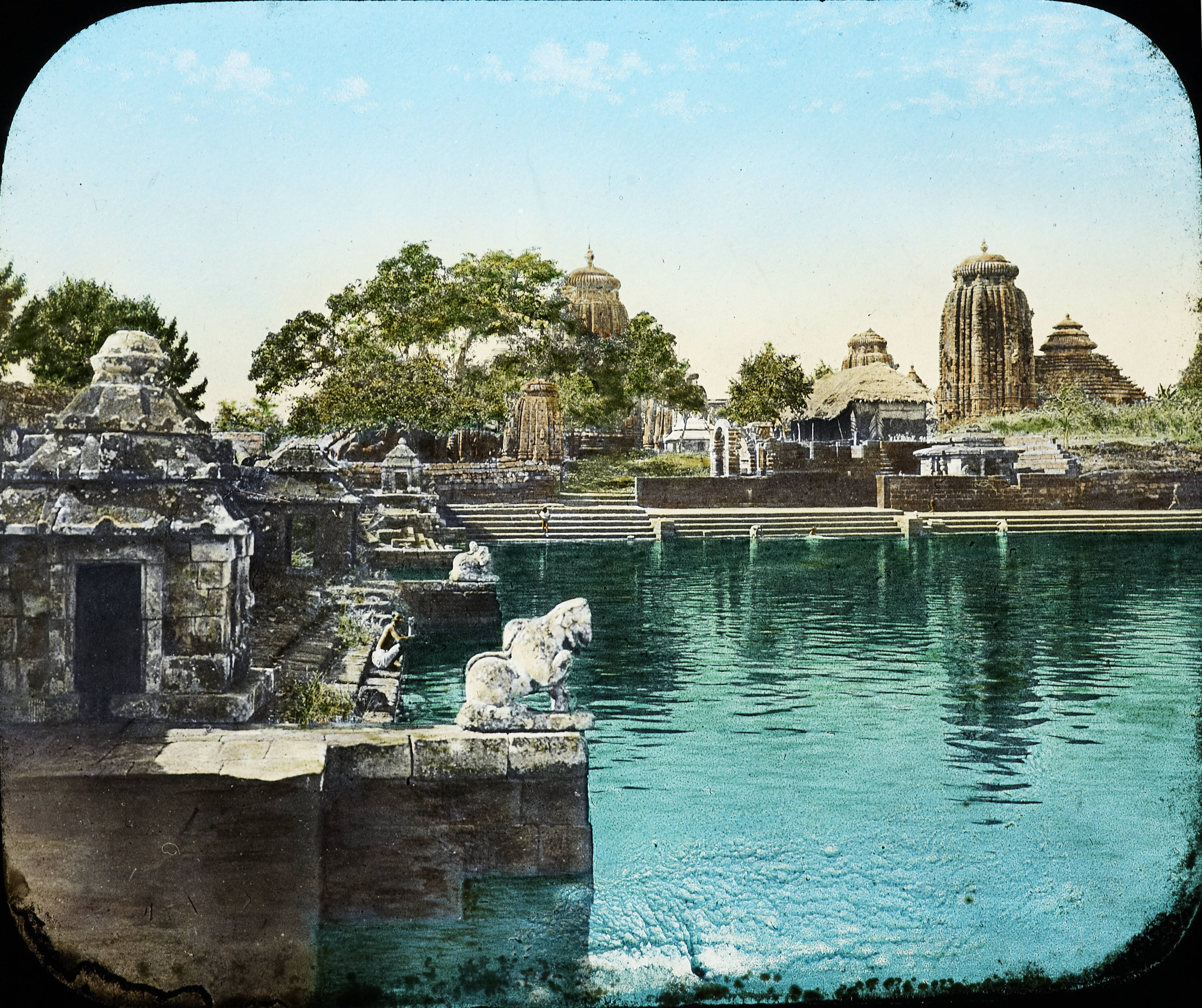
Bindu Sagar with Lingaraj Temple in background

Hindus form the majority in the city with more than 95% of the total population, as of 2011 Census of India. Muslims forms the second largest minority with 3.3% and Christians with 0.92%. There is also a significant minority population of Sikhs, Buddhists and Jains.

== Governance and politics ==
=== Civic administration ===
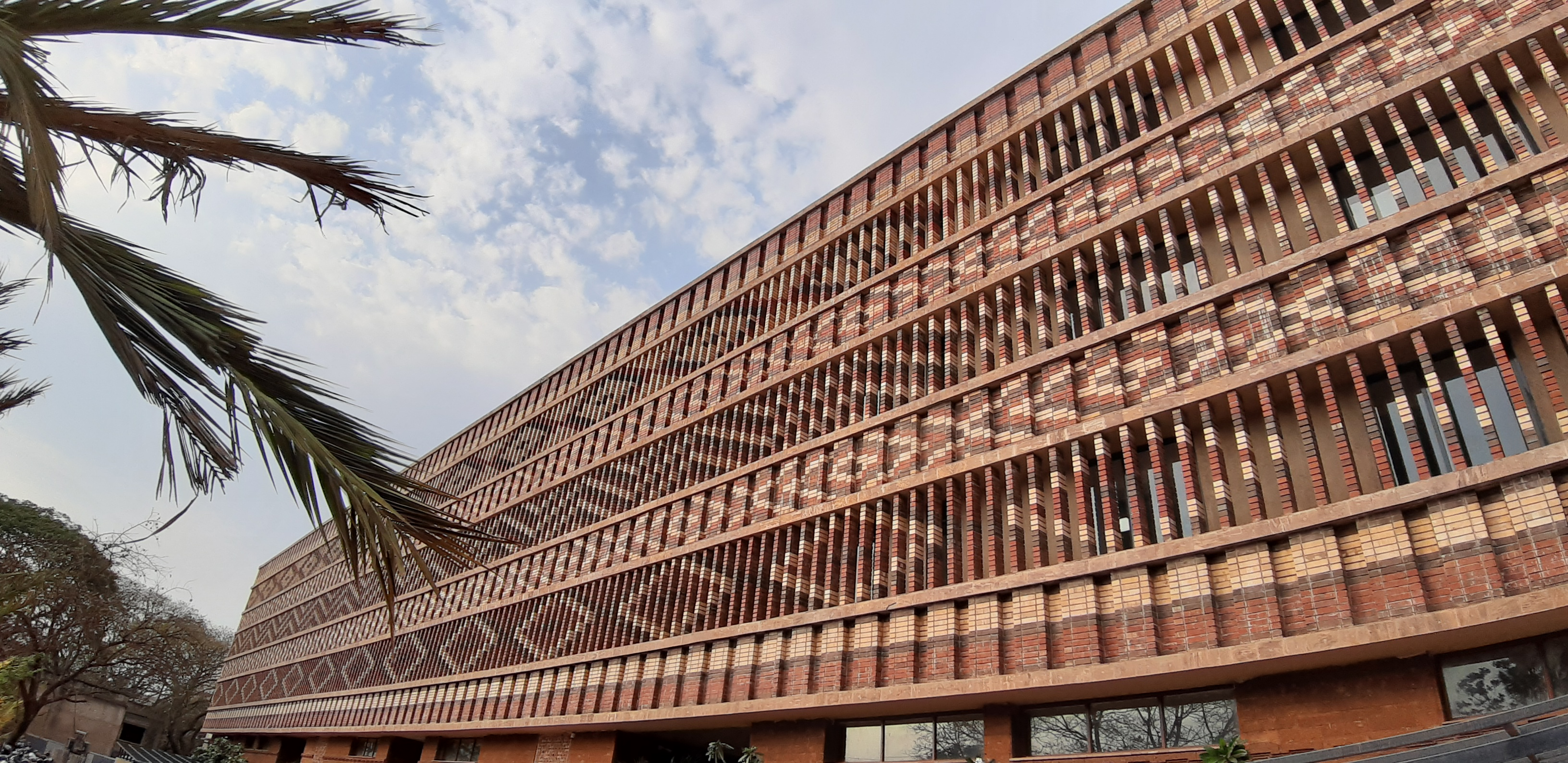
Krushi Bhavan building in Bhubaneswar.

The Bhubaneswar Municipal Corporation (BMC) oversees and manages civic infrastructure for the city's 67 wards. It started as a Notified Area Committee in 1946 and was upgraded to a municipal corporation in 1994. Orissa Municipal Corporation Act, 2003 is the governing act. Residents of each ward elect a corporator to the BMC for a five-year term. Standing committees handle urban planning and maintain roads, government-aided schools, hospitals and municipal markets.

As Bhubaneswar's apex body, the corporation discharges its functions through the mayor-in-council, which comprises a mayor, a deputy mayor and other elected members. The executive wing is headed by a Commissioner. There are 13 administrative departments under BMC: PR & Communication, Disaster Management, Finance, Health & Sanitation, Engineering, Revenue & Tax, Electrical, Environment, Social Welfare, IT and Social Projects, Establishment, Land & Assets, Enforcement & Recovery. The responsibilities of the municipal body include drainage and sewerage, sanitation, solid waste management and street lighting.

The tenure of the last elected body ended in March 2022 and new elections have already taken place. Ward committees have been formed in Bhubaneswar and are very active. The Committees are responsible for issues such as public health, sanitation, street lighting and conservancy in their respective wards. There is no fixed number of members in the committees.

The processes for the municipal budget 2020–21 was initiated in February 2020, but it is unclear if they have continued after the lockdown was announced. The budget for 2020–21 was supposed to be around Rs. 700, an increase of 51.8% from the 2019–20 budget. The increase was supposedly to fund the various socio-economic welfare schemes in the city. The key revenue sources for BMC are: Holding Taxes, tax from advertisements, rent from municipal properties such as markets, shopping complexes, and kalyan mandaps (marriage halls), fees and user charges, and grants from state and central governments.

=== Municipal finance ===
According to financial data published on the CityFinance Portal of the Ministry of Housing and Urban Affairs, the Bhubaneswar Municipal Corporation reported total revenue receipts of ₹503 crore (US$61 million) and total expenditure of ₹380 crore (US$46 million) in 2022–23. Tax revenue accounted for about 16.3% of the total revenue, while the corporation received ₹188 crore in grants during the financial year.

=== Lok Sabha and Vidhan Sabha constituencies ===
Citizens of Bhubaneswar elect one representative to India's lower house, the Lok Sabha, and three representatives to the state legislative assembly, through the constituencies of Bhubaneswar North, Ekamra-Bhubaneswar, and Bhubaneswar Central. The last Lok Sabha election was in 2024, when Aparajita Sarangi from Bharatiya Janata Party won the seat. The last state assembly election took place in 2024 as well, when all three Vidhan Sabha seats in Bhubaneswar were won by Biju Janata Dal: Susant Kumar Rout from North, Babu Singh from Ekamra, and Ananta Narayan Jena from Central.

=== Judicial and police institutions ===
As the seat of the Government of Odisha, Bhubaneswar is home to the Odisha Legislative Assembly and the state secretariat. Bhubaneswar has lower courts: the Court of Small Causes and the District Civil Court decide civil matters; the Sessions Court rules in criminal cases. The Bhubaneswar–Cuttack Police Commissionerate, established in 2008, is a city police force with primary responsibilities in law enforcement and investigation in the Bhubaneswar-Cuttack area. Shri S.K. Priyadarshi, IPS is the police commissioner.

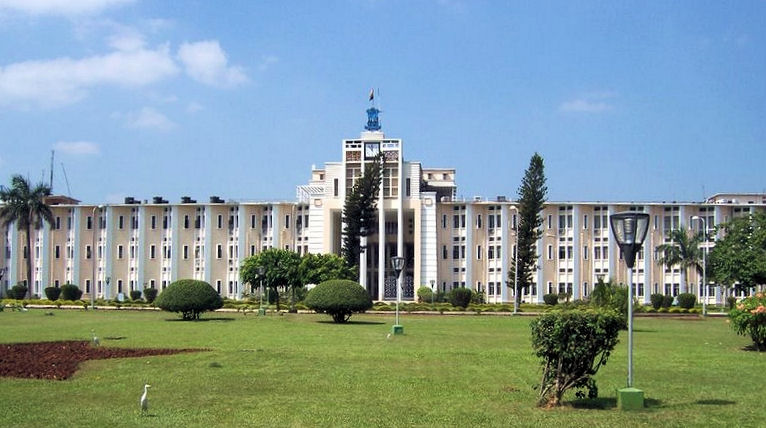
Odisha State Secretariat building

== Public utilities ==
Electricity was earlier being supplied by the state-operated Central Electricity Supply Utility of Odisha. TATA Power- TP-CODL, as a private entity, started power distribution in the city by the end of 2020. Fire services are handled by the state agency, Odisha Fire Service. Drinking water is sourced from the Mahanadi, Kuakhai and Daya rivers. Water supply and sewerage are handled by the Public Health Engineering Organisation. As of 2015, 35% of the city was covered by piped water connections, 1.4% of the households had metered water connection, and the extent of non-revenue water in the city ran to 62.5%. The Engineering Department of BMC creates and maintains roads.

Sewage networks cover 26.7% of the city, while more than 50% of the households are dependent on onsite containment systems, such as septic tanks. There is no sewage treatment plant in Bhubaneswar right now, but one is being built using JNNURM funds. The waste from the limited sewage network flows untreated into the Daya river. There is one septage treatment plant for fecal sludge with a capacity of 75 KLD.

The municipal corporation is responsible for the solid waste management in the city. The average municipal waste generated in the city is 480 kg/m3 for wet waste and 600 kg/m3 for wet waste. Bhubaneswar Municipal Corporation BMC has introduced door to door collection through battery operated garbage collection vehicle. It is trying to introduce segregation at source by providing two waste bins to every household, one each for dry and wet waste. Landfilling is the most common method of waste disposal in Bhubaneswar. State-owned Bharat Sanchar Nigam Limited, or BSNL, as well as private enterprises, among them Reliance Jio, Bharti Airtel, Vodafone Idea, are the leading telephone, cell phone and internet service providers in the city.

== Education ==
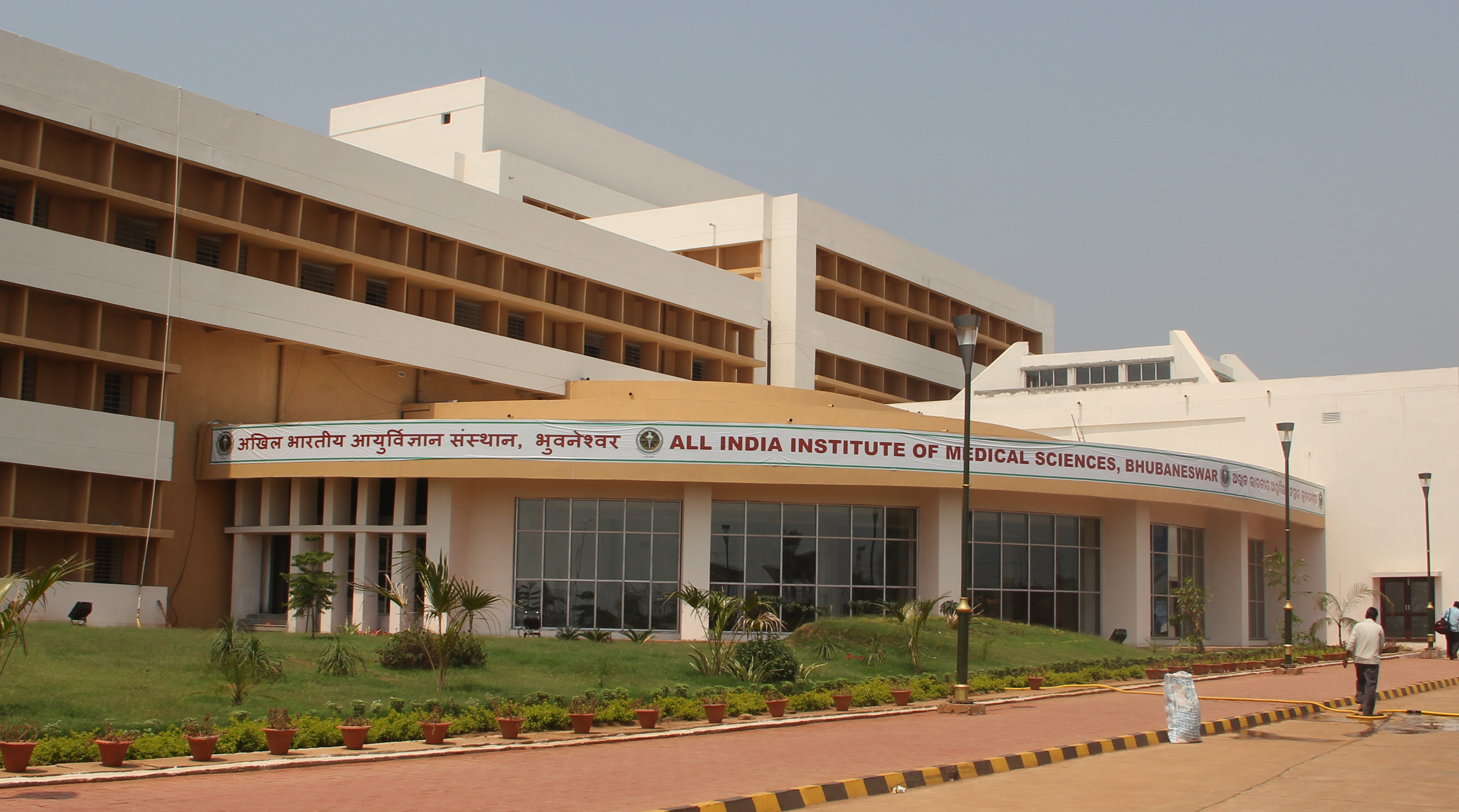
AIIMS Bhubaneswar

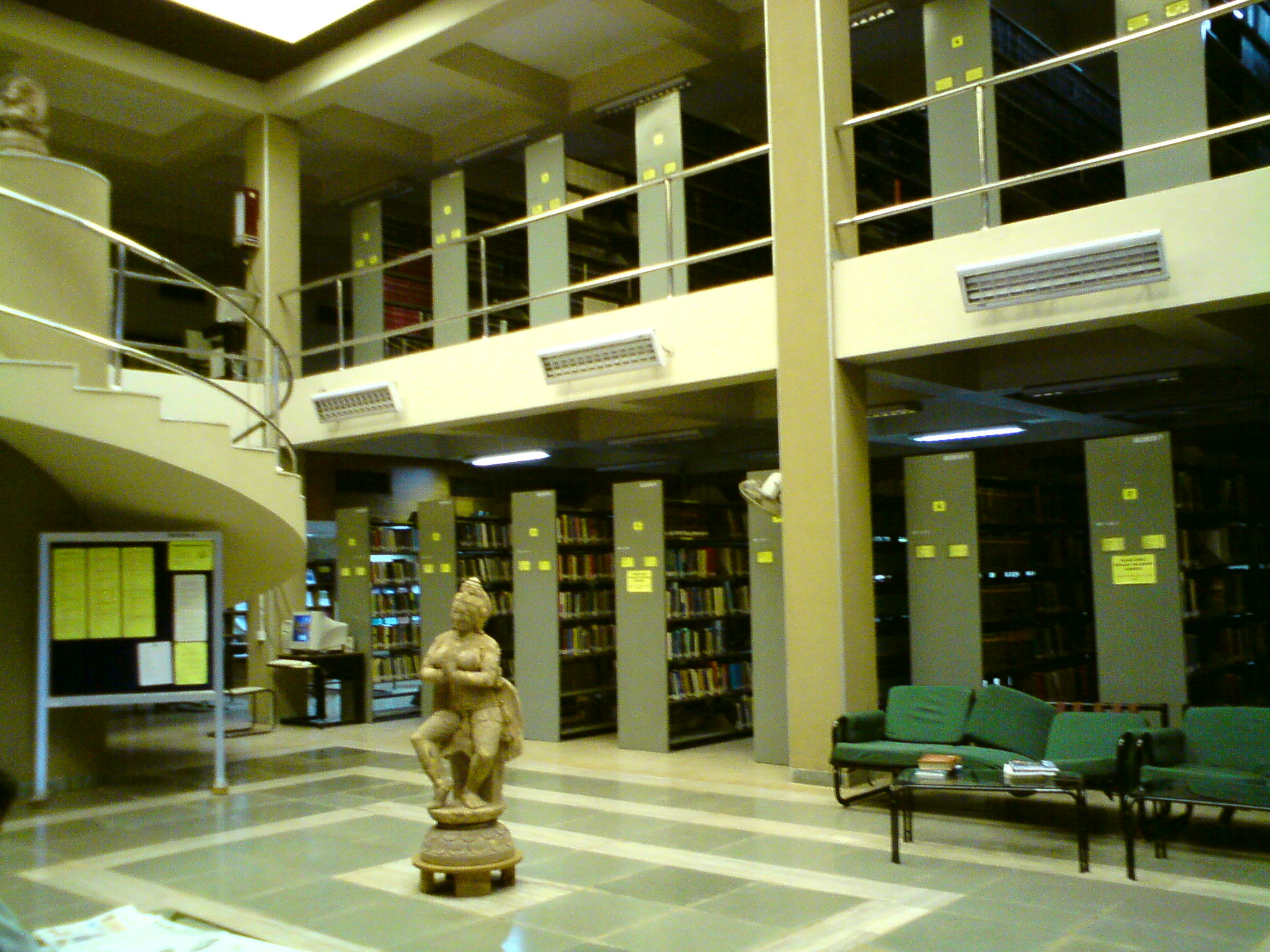
Institute of Physics, Bhubaneswar

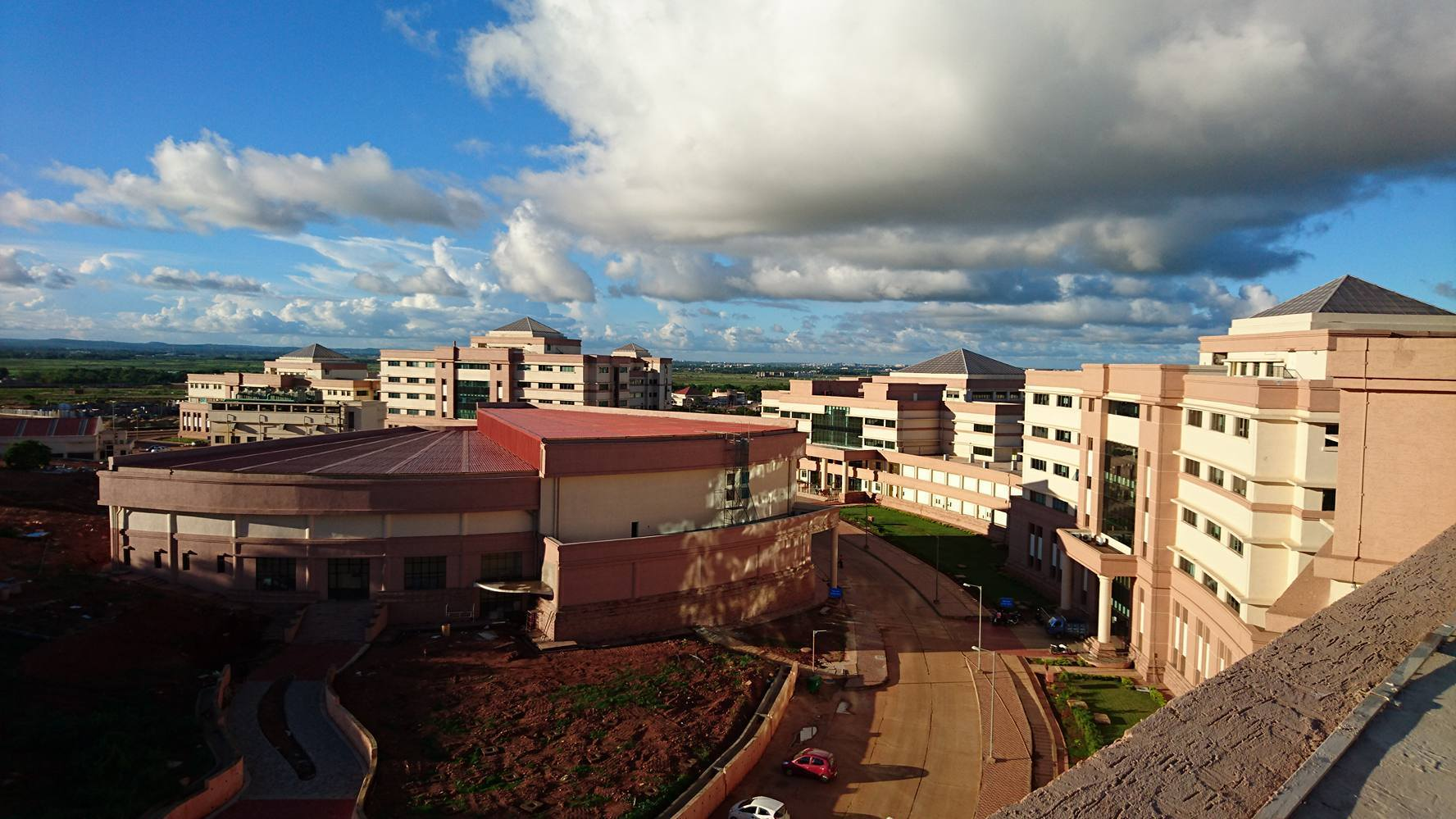
NISER

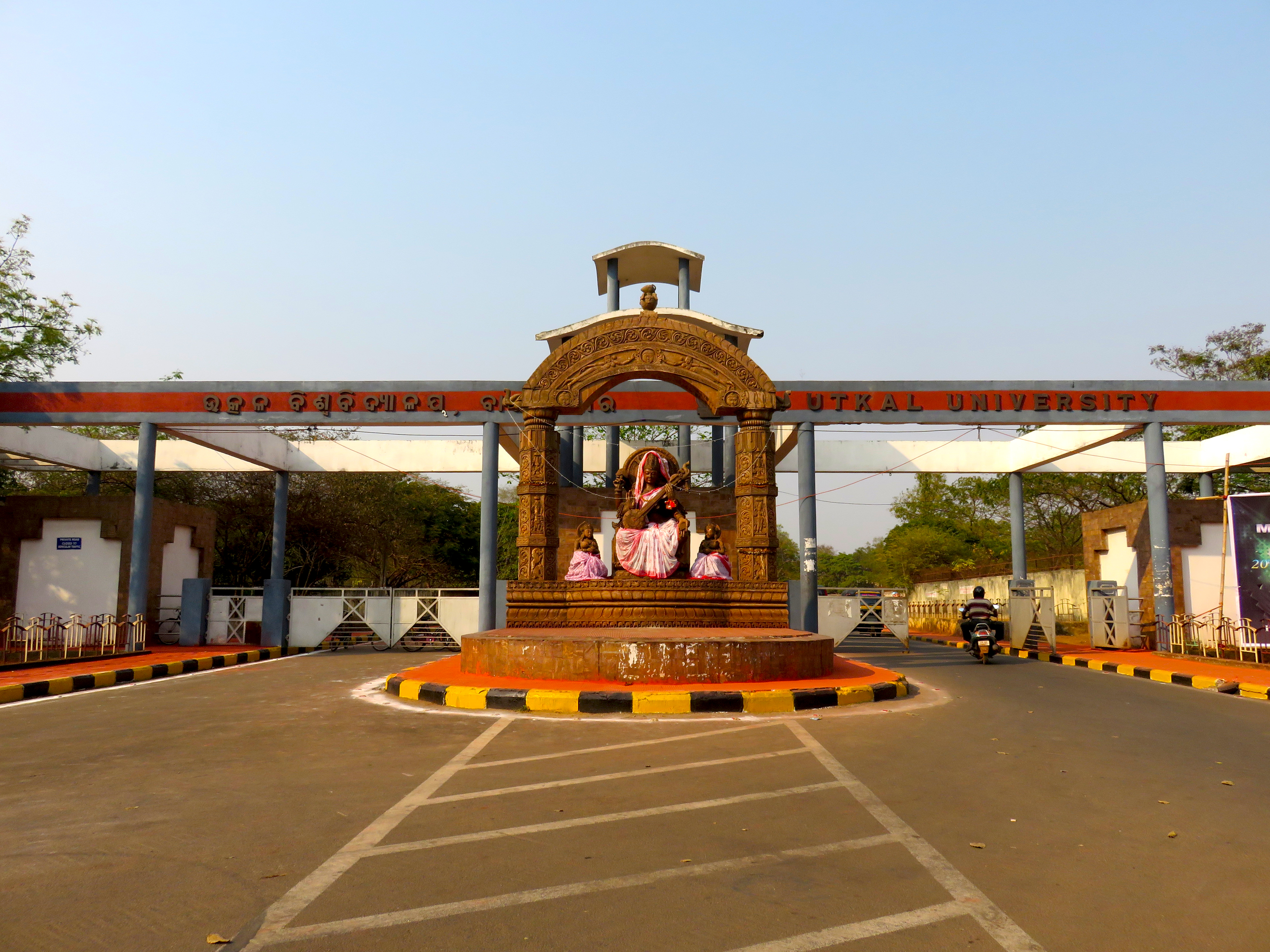
Utkal University

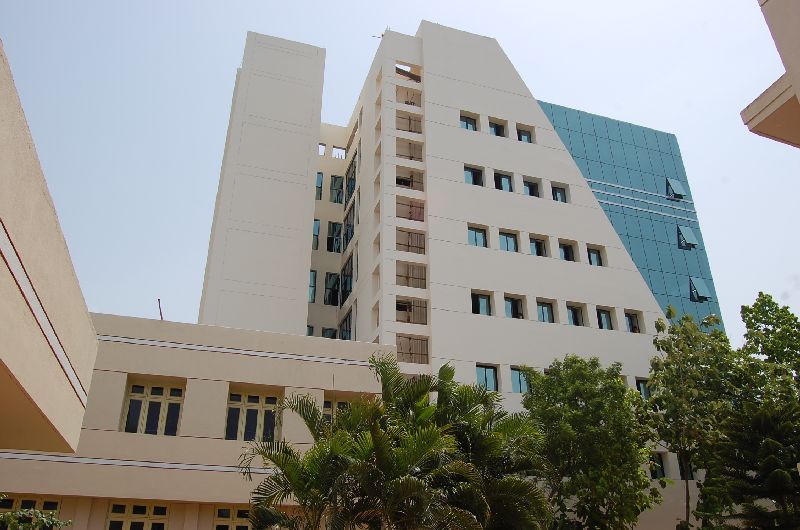
Xavier Institute of Management, Bhubaneswar

Bhubaneswar is a centre for higher education in the Eastern Region and is considered the education hub of Eastern India with several government and privately funded Universities and colleges. IIT Bhubaneswar, NISER Bhubaneswar, AIIMS Bhubaneswar and NIFT Bhubaneswar are some of the elite institutions of country which are located in the city. Utkal University Bhubaneswar is the oldest university in Odisha and the 17th oldest university in India.

=== Primary and secondary education ===
Odia and English are the primary languages of instruction. Schools in Bhubaneswar follow the "10+2+3" plan for Regular Graduates and "10+2+4" plan for Technical studies. Schools in Bhubaneswar are either run by the state government or private organisations. Students typically enroll in schools that are affiliated with any of the following mediums of education.

- BSE, Odisha
- CHSE, Odisha
- CBSE
- Council for the Indian School Certificate Examinations
- SCTE&VT, Odisha

Notable union government schools in the city include

- Kendriya Vidyalaya No. 1, Bhubaneswar,
- Sainik School

Notable state government schools in the city include

- Badagada Government High School, Bhubaneswar
- Capital High School, Bhubaneswar
- Government High School, Saheed Nagar

Notable private schools in the city include

- D.A.V. Public School, Chandrasekharpur,
- DAV Public School, Unit-8, Bhubaneswar,
- Loyola School, Bhubaneswar,
- Sai International School, Bhubaneswar

=== Higher education ===
Several colleges are affiliated with universities or institution based in Bhubaneswar or elsewhere in India. Most offer a wide range of programs in STEM and applied research and are rated highly by the Ministry of Human Resource Development, India.

==== Engineering and applied sciences institutions ====
- C. V. Raman Global University
- Indian Institute of Technology Bhubaneswar
- Institute of Chemical Technology, Mumbai (off campus in collaboration with IndianOil and IIT Kharagpur)
- Institute of Minerals and Materials Technology (IMMT, erstwhile RRL)
- Institute of Physics
- International Institute of Information Technology, Bhubaneswar (IIIT-BBSR or IIIT-BH)
- Kalinga Institute of Industrial Technology
- National Institute of Fashion Technology (NIFT)
- National Institute of Science Education and Research (NISER)
- Orissa Engineering College
- Regional Institute of Education
- Veer Surendra Sai University of Technology (VSSUT, Formerly UCE Burla)

==== Medical institutions ====
- All India Institute of Medical Sciences Bhubaneswar
- Institute of Medical Sciences and Sum Hospital
- Kalinga Institute of Medical Sciences
- Regional Medical Research Centre

==== Universities ====
- Centurion University of Technology and Management, Bhubaneswar
- International Institute of Information Technology, Bhubaneswar (IIIT-BBSR or IIIT-BH)
- Kalinga Institute of Industrial Technology
- Odisha State Open University
- Odisha University of Agriculture and Technology
- Odisha University of Health Sciences
- Odisha University of Technology and Research
- Rama Devi Women's University
- Siksha 'O' Anusandhan
- Utkal University of Culture
- Utkal University
- Veer Surendra Sai University of Technology
- XIM University

==== Think tanks and research institutes ====
- Nabakrushna Choudhury Centre for Development Studies (NCDS)

The Eastern Regional Centre of Indian Institute of Tourism and Travel Management (IITTM), was established in 1996. One IATA Authorised Training Centre (ATC) is located in the city. Several regional management educational institutions also have travel and tourism related courses in their curriculum.

== Transport ==
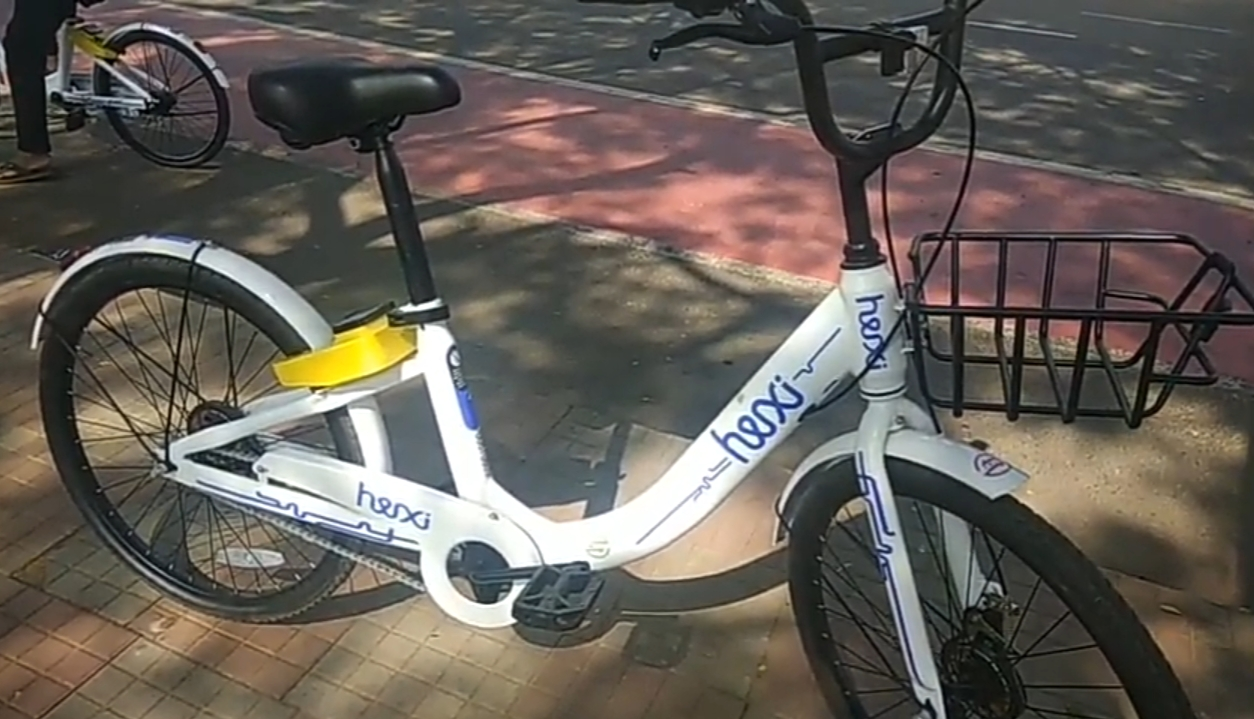
Mo Cycle

=== Bicycle ===
A public bicycle sharing project named Mo Cycle was created by Bhubaneswar Smart City Limited (BSCL) and the Capital Region Urban Transport (CRUT). The scheme aims to reduce traffic congestion, promote non-motorized transport in the city and ensure better last mile connectivity. Chief minister Naveen Patnaik in November 2011 inaugurated Mo Cycle. Around 400 cycle stands have been set up across the city. Around 2,000 bicycles have been ordered from three companies – Hexi, Yaana and Yulu. Hexi (from Hero Cycles) will provide 1,000 bicycles and Yaana and Yulu will provide 500 each. The bicycles are accessed by the Dedicated mobile app – "mo app".

=== Bus ===
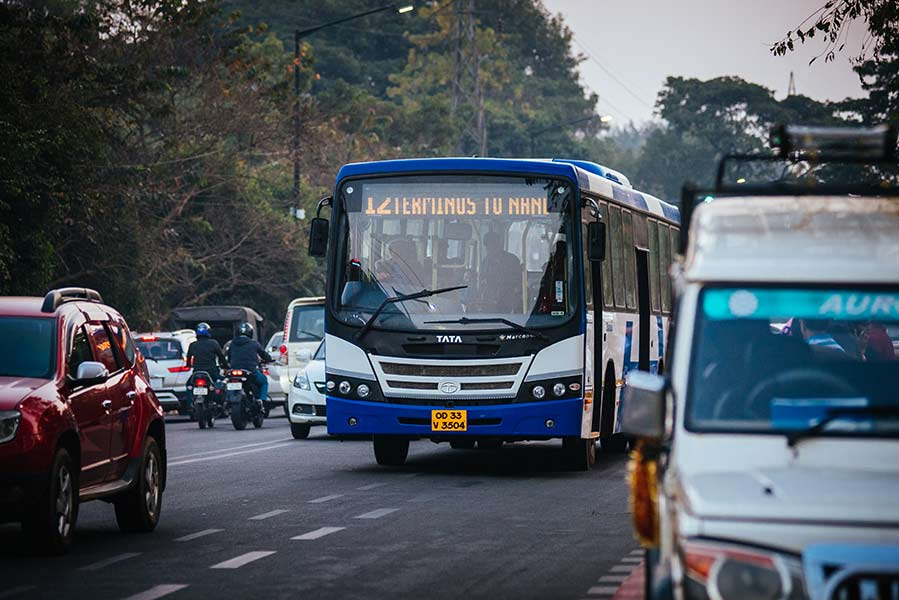
Mo Bus

Internal public transport is maintained by Mo Bus (My Bus) service administered by Capital Region Urban Transport (CRUT) along with connecting nearest cities like Cuttack and Puri. The headquarters of the Odisha State Road Transport Corporation (OSRTC) is in Bhubaneswar. The main Bhubaneswar inter-state bus terminus is at Baramunda, 8 kilometres (5.0 mi) from the city centre, from where OSRTC and private operators run buses connecting Bhubaneswar to cities in Odisha and with the neighbouring states of Andhra Pradesh, Jharkhand, West Bengal and Chhattisgarh. Bhubaneswar is connected to the rest of Odisha and India by National Highway-NH 16, which is a part of the Kolkata-Chennai prong of the Golden Quadrilateral, NH 203, State Highway 13 (Odisha) and State Highway 27 (Odisha). Asian Highway- AH 45 passes through the city.

=== Road ===
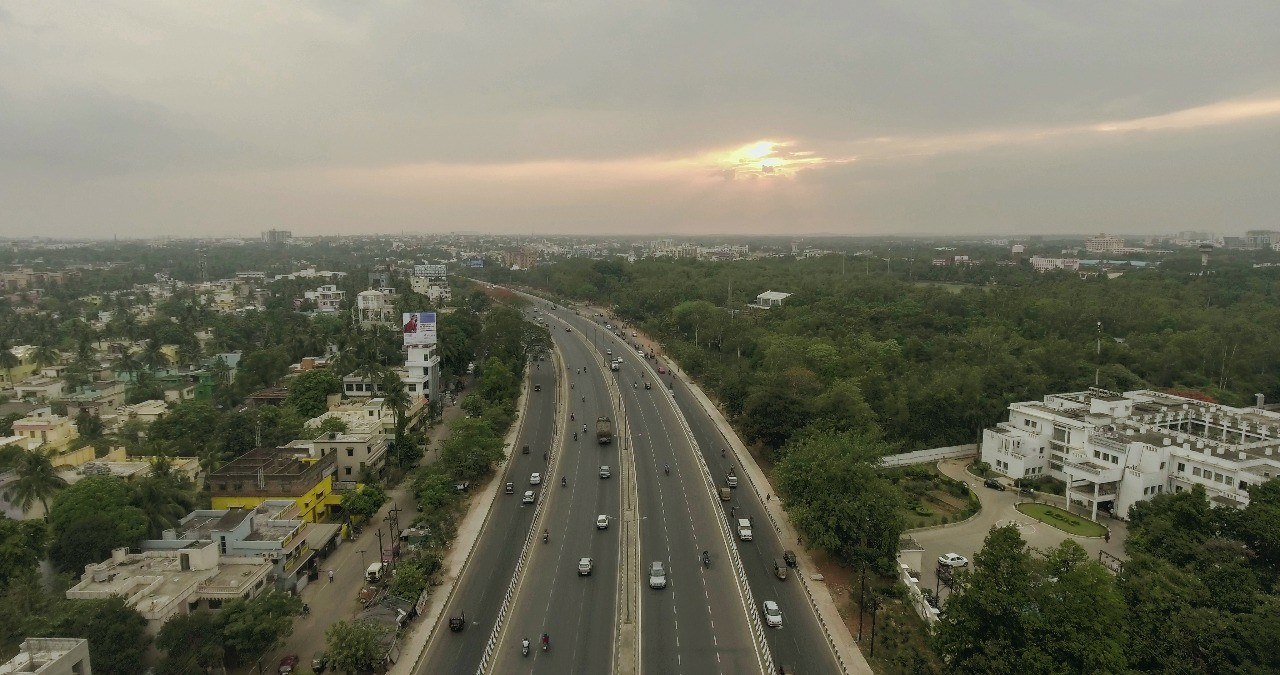
One of the many fly-overs in the city

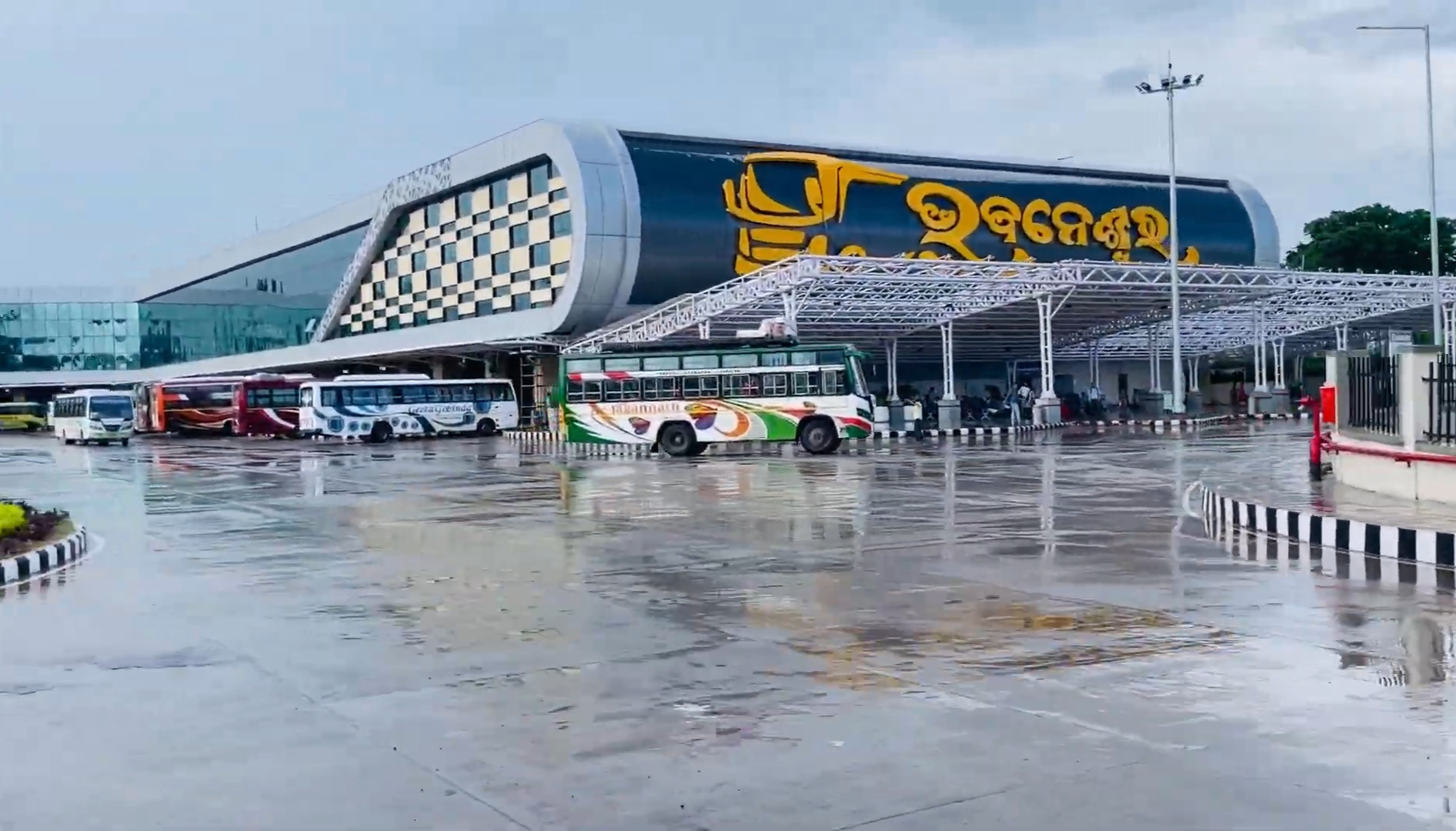
ISBT Baramunda

Bhubaneswar has roads in grid form in the central city. Bhubaneswar has approximately 1,600 kilometres (990 mi) of roads, with average road density of 11.82 square kilometres (4.56 sq mi). ISBT Baramunda is the major bus terminus in the city from where buses ply to all the districts in Odisha as well as to neighbouring state's cities like Kolkata, Visakhapatnam, Raipur and Ranchi. The city bus service called Mo Bus plies across Bhubaneswar by Capital Region Urban Transport Authority run by Bhubaneswar Development Authority. A fleet of more than 300 buses cover all major destinations including Cuttack, Puri and Khordha. Auto rickshaws are available for hire and on a share basis throughout the city. In parts of the city, cycle rickshaws offer short trips. To ease traffic jams, over-bridges at major road junctions and expansion of roads are under construction. In a study of six cities in India, Bhubaneswar was ranked third concerning pedestrian infrastructure. The city scored 50 points out of a maximum of 100.

=== Railway station ===
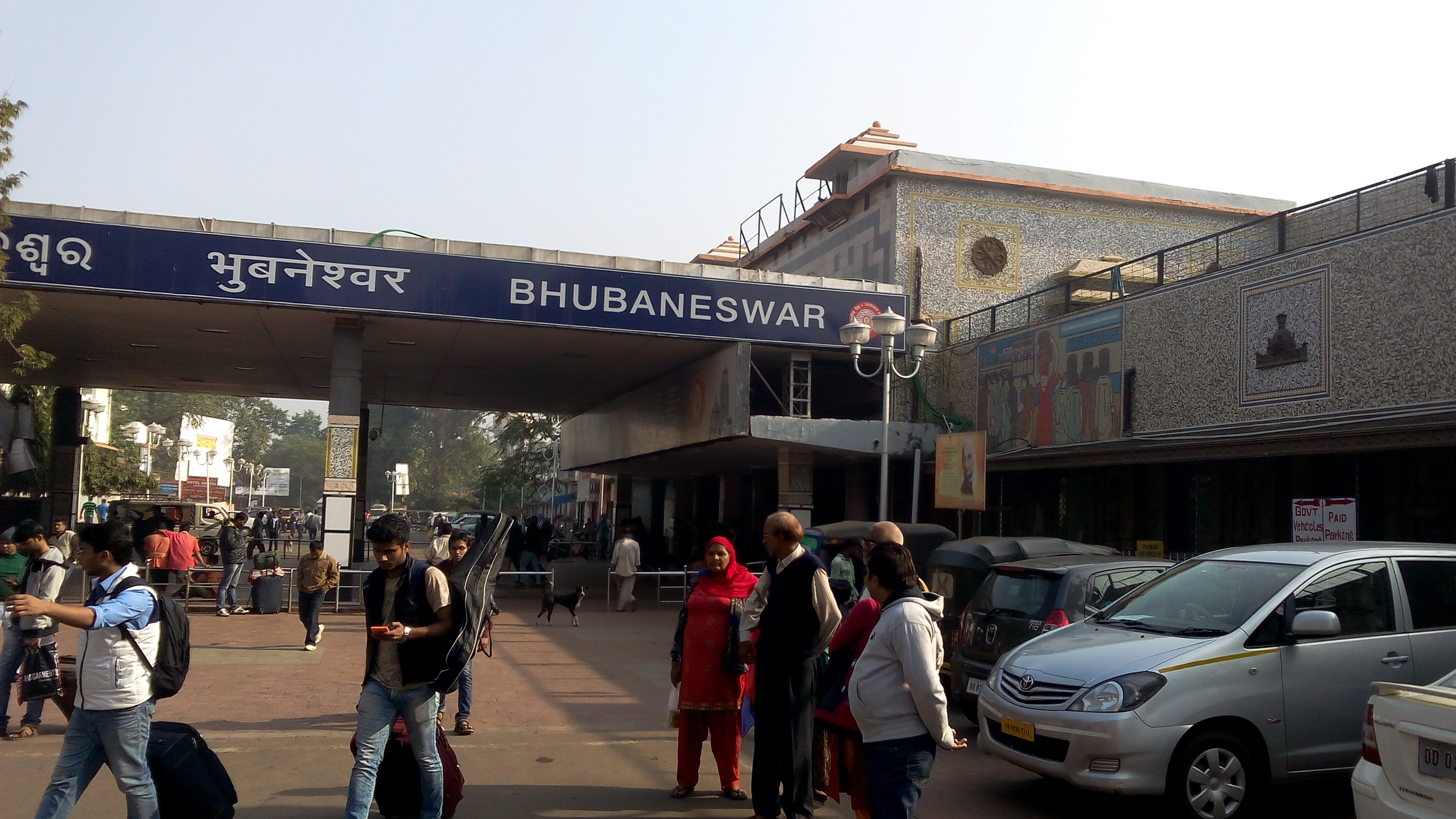
Bhubaneswar railway station

Bhubaneswar has the following stations:

Station name	Station code	Railway zone	Number of platforms
Bhubaneswar	BBS	East Coast Railway	6
Mancheswar	MCS	East Coast Railway	4
Lingaraj Temple Road	LGTR	East Coast Railway	3
Vani Vihar	BNBH	East Coast Railway	2
Patia	PTAB	East Coast Railway	2
New Bhubaneswar	BBSN	East Coast Railway	7
Barang	BRAG	East Coast Railway	3

The East Coast Railway has its headquarters in Bhubaneswar. Bhubaneswar railway station is one of the main stations of the Indian railway network. It is connected to major cities by daily express and passenger trains and daily service to all metro cities is available from here. However, the station is overloaded by existing traffic. Currently, the station has six platforms. There are plans to add two more platforms.

A satellite station New Bhubaneswar railway station is opened near Barang in July 2018 to decongest the existing installation.

=== Airport ===
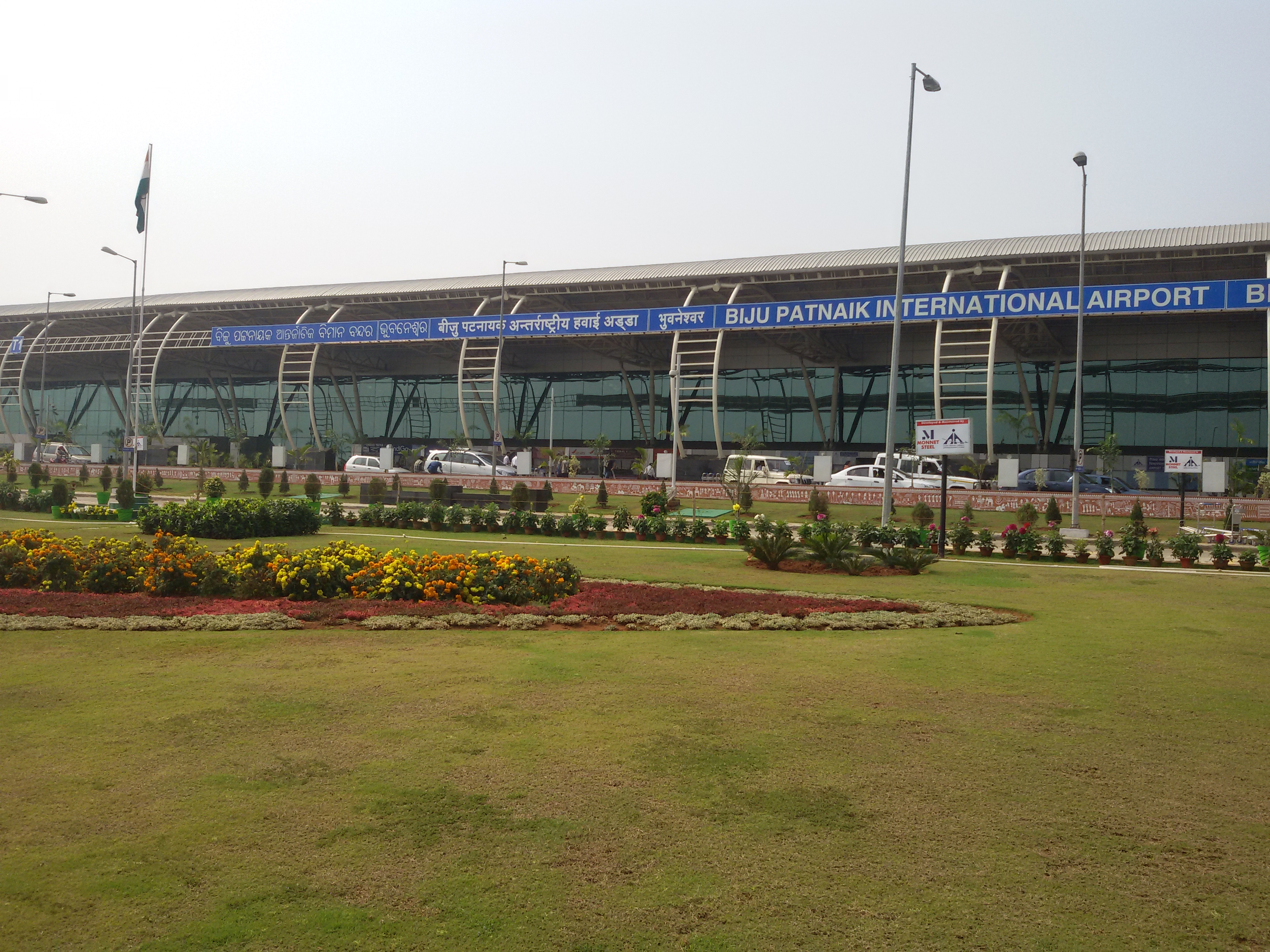
Biju Patnaik International Airport

Biju Patnaik International Airport (IATA: BBI, ICAO: VEBS) also known as Bhubaneswar Airport, 3 kilometres (1.9 mi) south of the city centre, is the major and sole international airport in Odisha. There are daily domestic flights from Bhubaneswar to Delhi, Hyderabad, Mumbai, Kolkata, Vishakhapatnam, Chennai and Bangalore and international flights from Bhubaneswar to Dubai, Singapore and Bangkok. The major carriers from Bhubaneswar are Indigo, Vistara, Akasa Air, and AirAsia India. In March 2013, a new domestic terminal with a capacity of handling 30 million passengers per year was inaugurated to handle increased air traffic. On 10 July 2015, the first international flight took off from Terminal 2 of Biju Patnaik International Airport.

== Culture ==
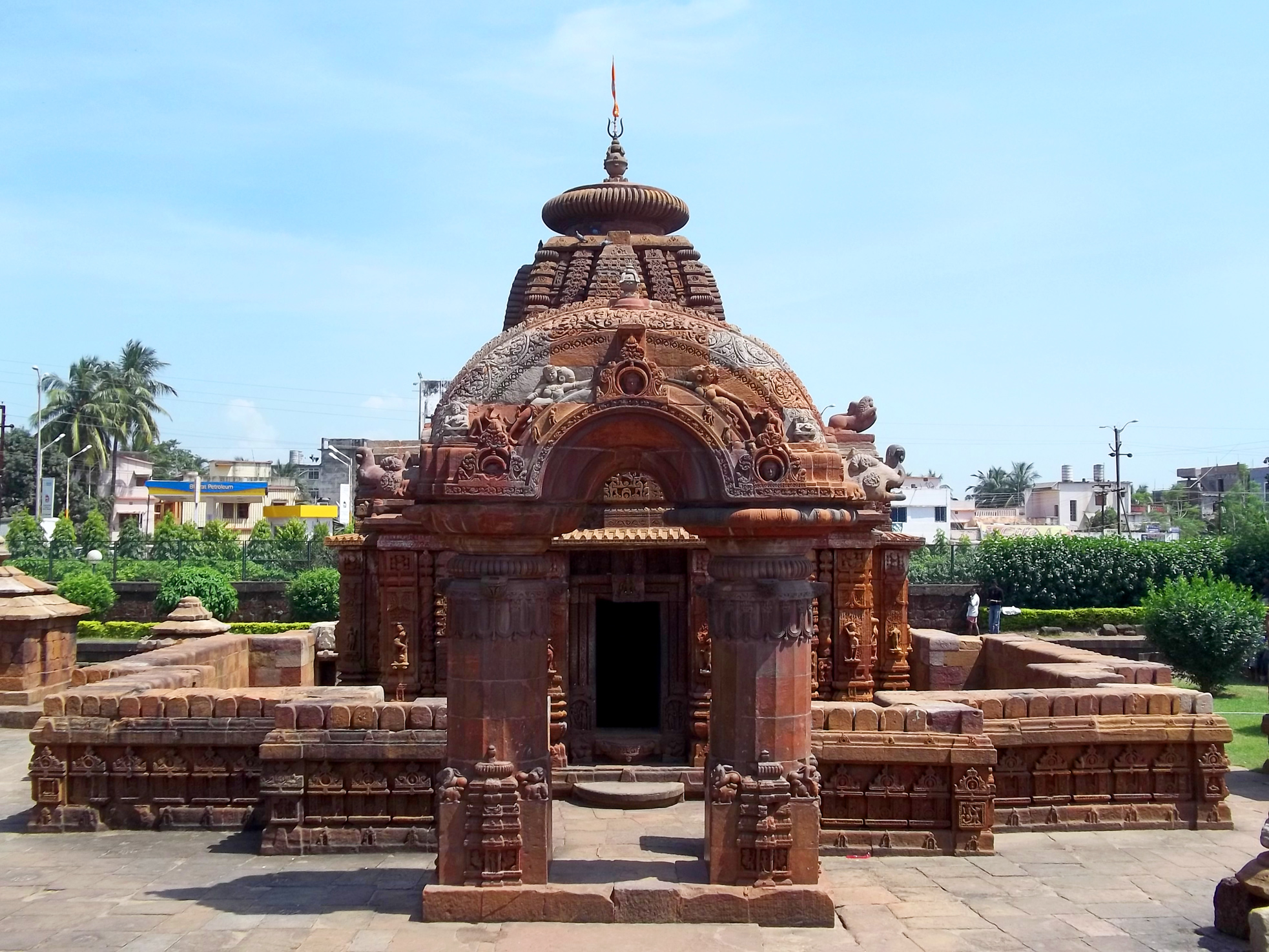
Muktesvara deula, covered with erotic ancient carvings, known for its quality of sculptures

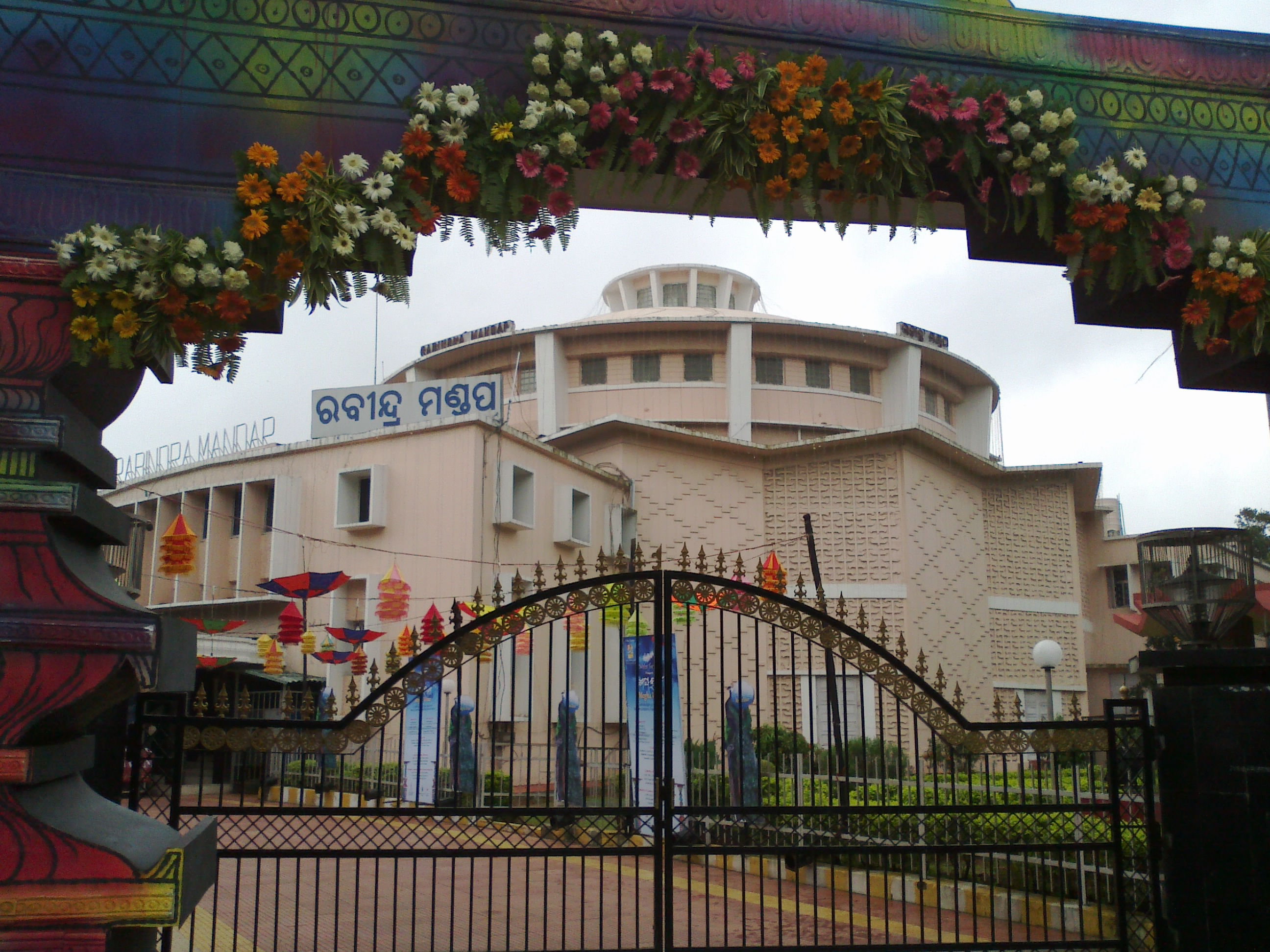
Ravindra Mandapa, an auditorium in Bhubaneswar

Bhubaneswar is supposed to have had over one thousand temples, earning the tag of the 'Temple City of India'. Temples are made in the Kalinga architectural style with a pine spire that curves up to a point over the sanctum housing the presiding deity and a pyramid-covered hall where people sit and pray.

Temples include Lingaraja Temple, Muktesvara Temple, Rajarani Temple, Ananta Vasudeva Temple. The Kukutesvara Siva Temple is a small, 1000-year-old shrine to Shiva.

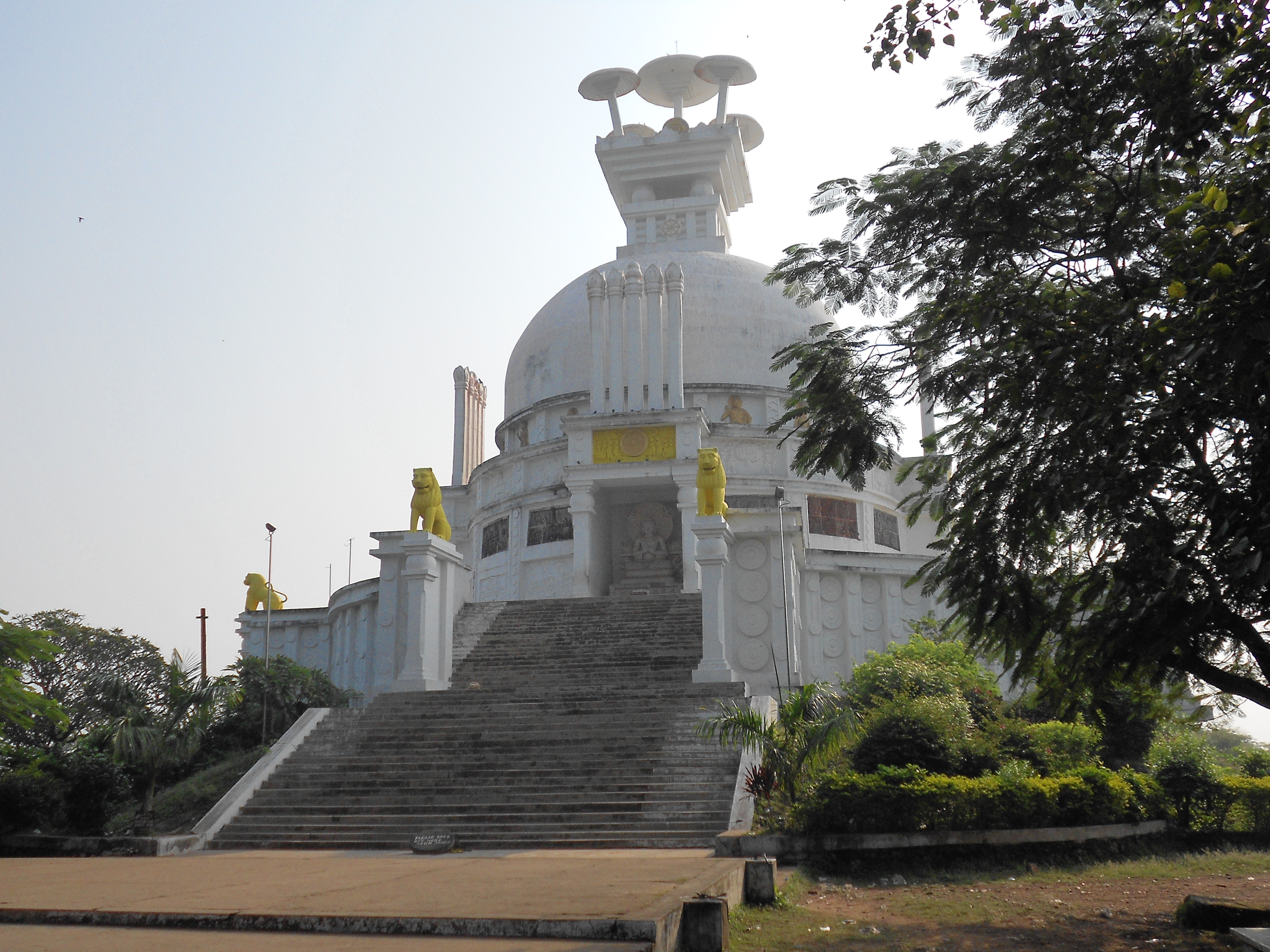
Dhauligiri Peace Pagoda

The twin hills of Khandagiri and Udayagiri, served as the site of an ancient Jaina monastery which was carved into cave-like chambers in the face of the hill. These caves, with artistic carvings, date back to the 2nd century BCE. Dhauli hills has major edicts of Ashoka engraved on a mass of rock and a white Peace Pagoda, built by the Japan Buddha Sangha and the Kalinga Nippon Buddha Sangha in the 1970s. Apart from the ancient temples, other important temples were built in recent times including Ram Mandir and ISKCON.

Bhubaneswar along with Cuttack is the home of the Odia cinema industry, dubbed "Ollywood", where most of the state's film studios are situated.

Odia culture survives in the form of Classical Odissi dance, handicrafts, sand artistry and sculpturing as well as theatre and music. Boundary walls and gardens are increasingly being redone to depict the folk art of the state. Odissi, the oldest of the eight surviving classical dance forms of India can be traced from archaeological evidence of the temples in Bhubaneswar.

=== Odissi dance ===
Odissi dance is generally accompanied by Odissi music. Srjan, the Odissi dance academy founded by Guru Kelucharan Mohapatra, the legendary Odissi dancer is found here. The Rabindra Mandapa in central Bhubaneswar plays host to cultural engagements, theatre and private functions.

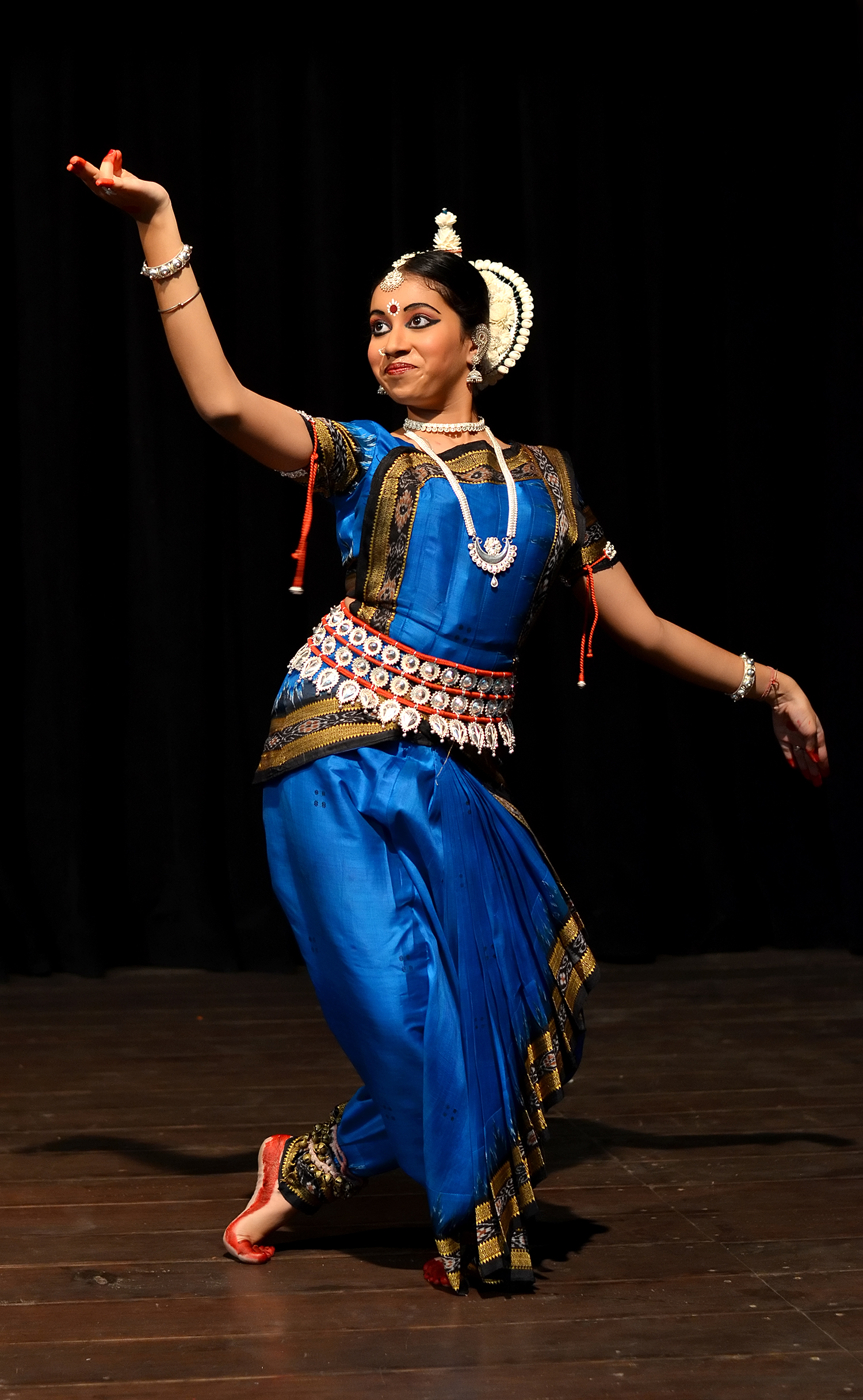
Odissi dance

=== Dress and attire ===
Though Odia women traditionally wear the sari, shalwar kameez and of late, Western attire is gaining acceptance among younger women. Western-style dress has greater acceptance among men, although the traditional dhoti and kurta are seen during festivals.

The Odisha State Museum offers archaeological artefacts, weapons, local arts and crafts as well as insights into Odisha's natural and indigenous history. The Tribal Research Institute Museum hosts authentic tribal dwellings created by tribal craftsmen. Nandankanan Zoological Park, located on the northern outskirt of the city, is India's first zoo to join World Association of Zoos and Aquariums. The State Botanical Garden (Odisha) and Regional Plant Resource Centre, popularly known as Ekamra Kanan, a park and botanical garden, has a large collection of exotic and regional fauna. The Ekamra Haat is a hand-loom and handicrafts market. Nicco Park and Ocean World are amusement parks. Other museums include Pathani Samanta Planetarium, Regional Museum of Natural History, Regional Science Centre and State Handicrafts Museum.

=== Festivals ===
On the day of Ashokashtami in the month of March or April, the image of Lingaraja (Shiva) and other deities are taken in a procession from Lingaraja Temple to the Mausima Temple, where the deities remain for four days. Hundreds of devotees participate in pulling the temple car that carries the deities, known as Rukuna Ratha. Ratha-Yatra, "Temple Car Festival," is the most important festival in Odisha and Bhubaneswar. The festival commemorates Jagannatha, who is said to have been the incarnation of India's revered deities, Vishnu and Krishna. Durga Puja, held in September–October, is an occasion for glamorous celebrations.

As a part of the Ekamra Festival, many cultural sub-festivals take place in January in Bhubaneswar which includes Kalinga Mahotsaba (for traditional martial arts), Dhauli-Kalinga Mahotsaba (for classical dance forms), Rajarani Music Festival (for classical music) and Mukteswara Dance Festival (for Odishi dance). Residents engage in khattis, or leisurely chats, that often take the form of freestyle intellectual conversation.

Other festivals celebrated include Shivaratri, Diwali, Ganesha Chaturthi, Nuakhai and Saraswati Puja. Eid and Christmas are celebrated by the religious minorities in the city.

The Adivasi Mela, held in January, is a fair that displays the art, artefacts, tradition, culture, and music of the tribal inhabitants of Odisha. The Toshali National Crafts Mela, held in December, showcases handicrafts from all over India and from foreign countries. Other important fairs in the city include the Rajdhani Book Fair, Dot Fest and Khandagiri Utsav. Two international literary festivals are held in the city, Kalinga Literary Festival and Mystic Kalinga Festival. In modern times, Bhubaneswar hosts a literary festival, the Odisha Literary Fest.

=== Cuisine ===
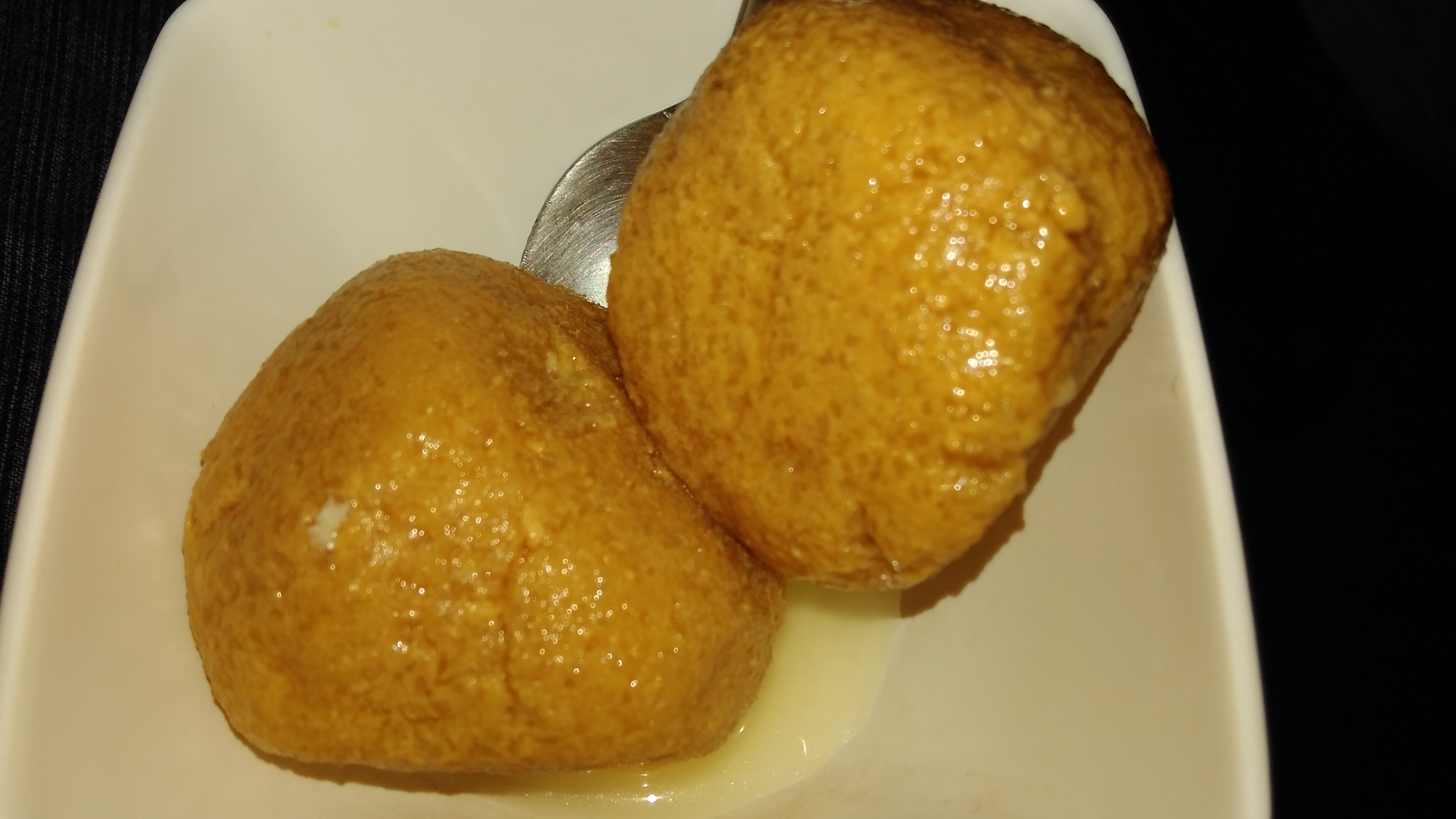
Pahala rasagola, a sweet which originated in Odisha

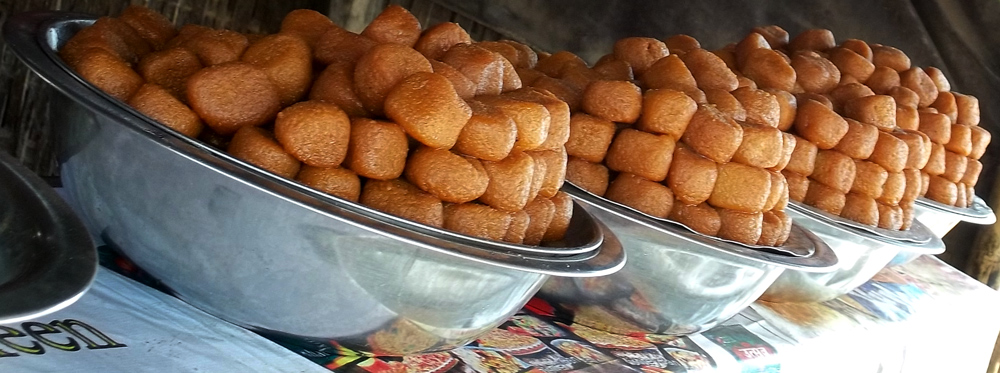
Chhena Gaja, a sweet of Odisha

Key elements of the city's cuisine include rice and a fish curry known as Machha Jhola, which can be accompanied by desserts such as Rasagola, Rasabali, Chhena Gaja, Chhena Jhilli and Chhena Poda. Odisha's large repertoire of seafood dishes includes various preparations of lobsters and crabs brought in from Chilika Lake.

Street foods such as gupchup (a deep-fried crêpe, stuffed with a mix of mashed potatoes and boiled yellow peas, and dipped in tamarind-infused water), cuttack-chaat, dahibara aloo dum (a deep-fried doughnut-shaped lentil dumpling marinated in yogurt-infused water and served alongside potato curry) and bara-ghuguni are sold all over the city. Traditional Oriya food such as dahi-pakhala (rice soaked in water with yogurt and seasonings) which is considered as a body coolant, accompanied by badi chura or saga are consumed during the months of April–June.

The abadha of Lingaraja Temple and Ananta Vasudeva Temple served for devotees is considered a vegetarian culinary delight. Other vegetarian dishes are Dalma (made of lentils and vegetables boiled together and then fried with other spices) and Santula (lightly spiced steamed vegetables).

== Sports ==
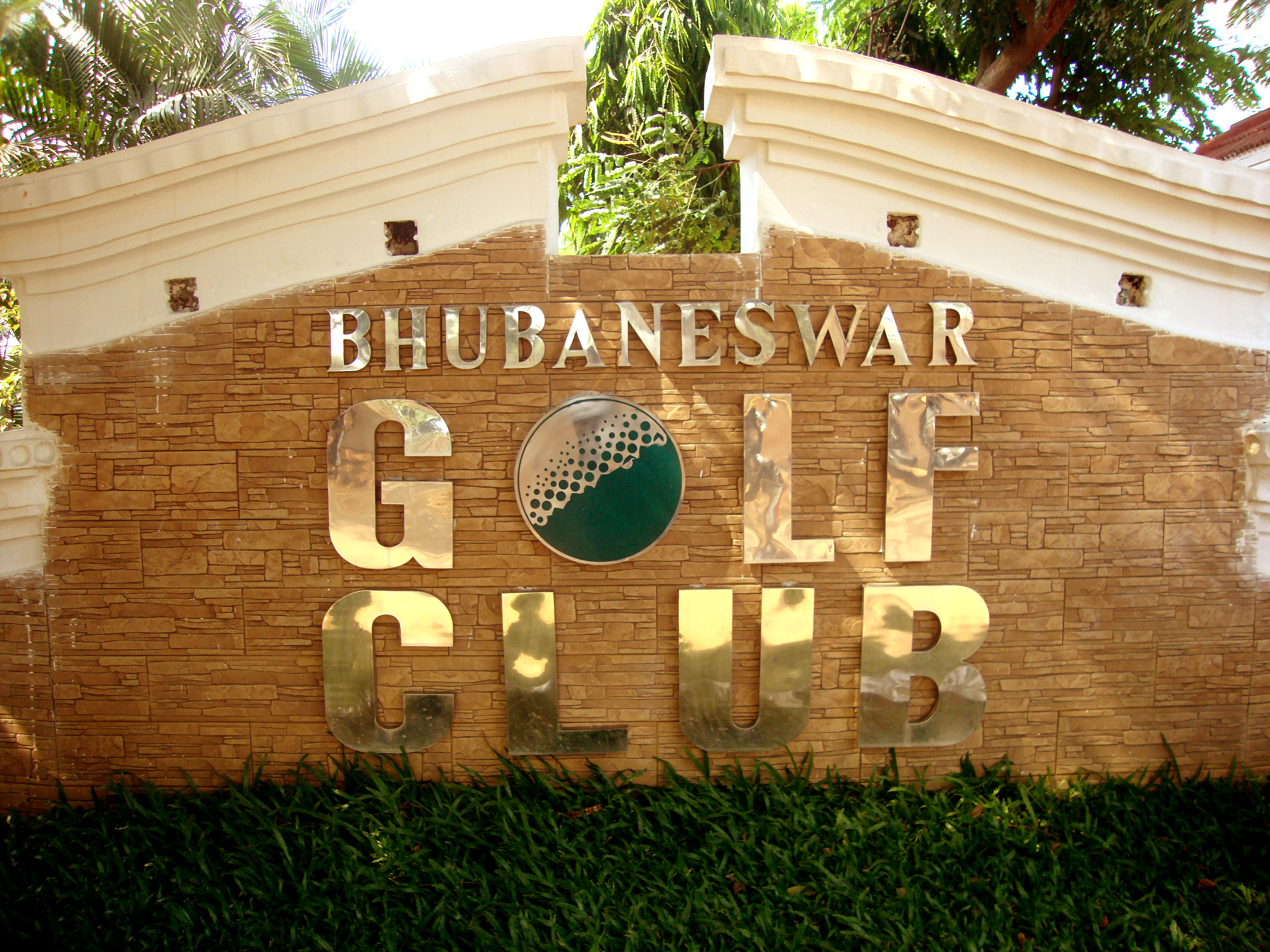
Bhubaneswar Golf Club

Bhubaneswar's major sporting arena is the Kalinga Stadium, having facilities for athletics, football, hockey, basketball, tennis, table tennis and swimming. It hosted the Odisha Hockey World Cup in November–December 2018 and becoming the first city to host two consecutive Field Hockey World cup by hosting the FIH WC with Rourkela in January 2023. Kalinga Lancers, the sixth franchise of Hockey India League (HIL) and Odisha FC of Indian Super League (ISL) are based in Bhubaneswar with Kalinga Stadium as their home ground. East Coast Railway Stadium, a prominent cricket stadium hosts Ranji Trophy and other matches.

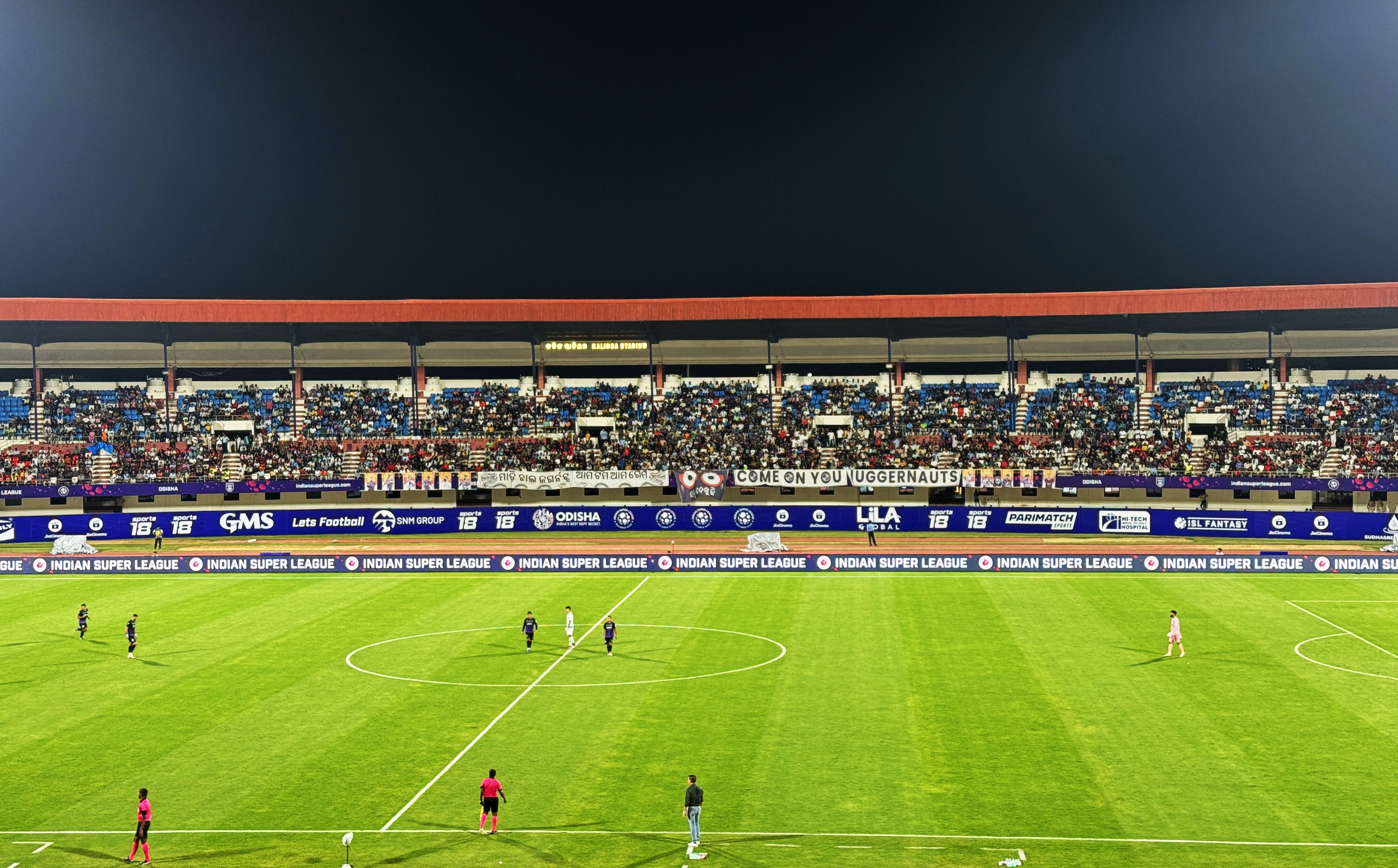
Kalinga Football Stadium during Indian Super League games

Odisha Naval Tata Hockey High Performance Centre, a hockey academy for sub-junior and junior category, has also been set up at Kalinga Stadium after Government of Odisha, Tata Steel & Tata Trusts (Hockey Ace foundation) joined hands to initiate a three-pronged program under the HPC banner of Government of Odisha. The construction of a gallery and stadium renovation is under way. An air-conditioned indoor stadium, with a capacity of 2000 spectators for badminton, volleyball, basketball and table tennis games is also being constructed. Barabati Stadium in Cuttack, Odisha's only venue for international cricket matches, is located around 25 kilometres (16 mi) away. Bhubaneswar has a franchise of Odisha Premier League, Bhubaneswar Jaguars, which started in 2010. Bhubaneswar Golf Club, a nine-hole golf course is situated in Infocity.

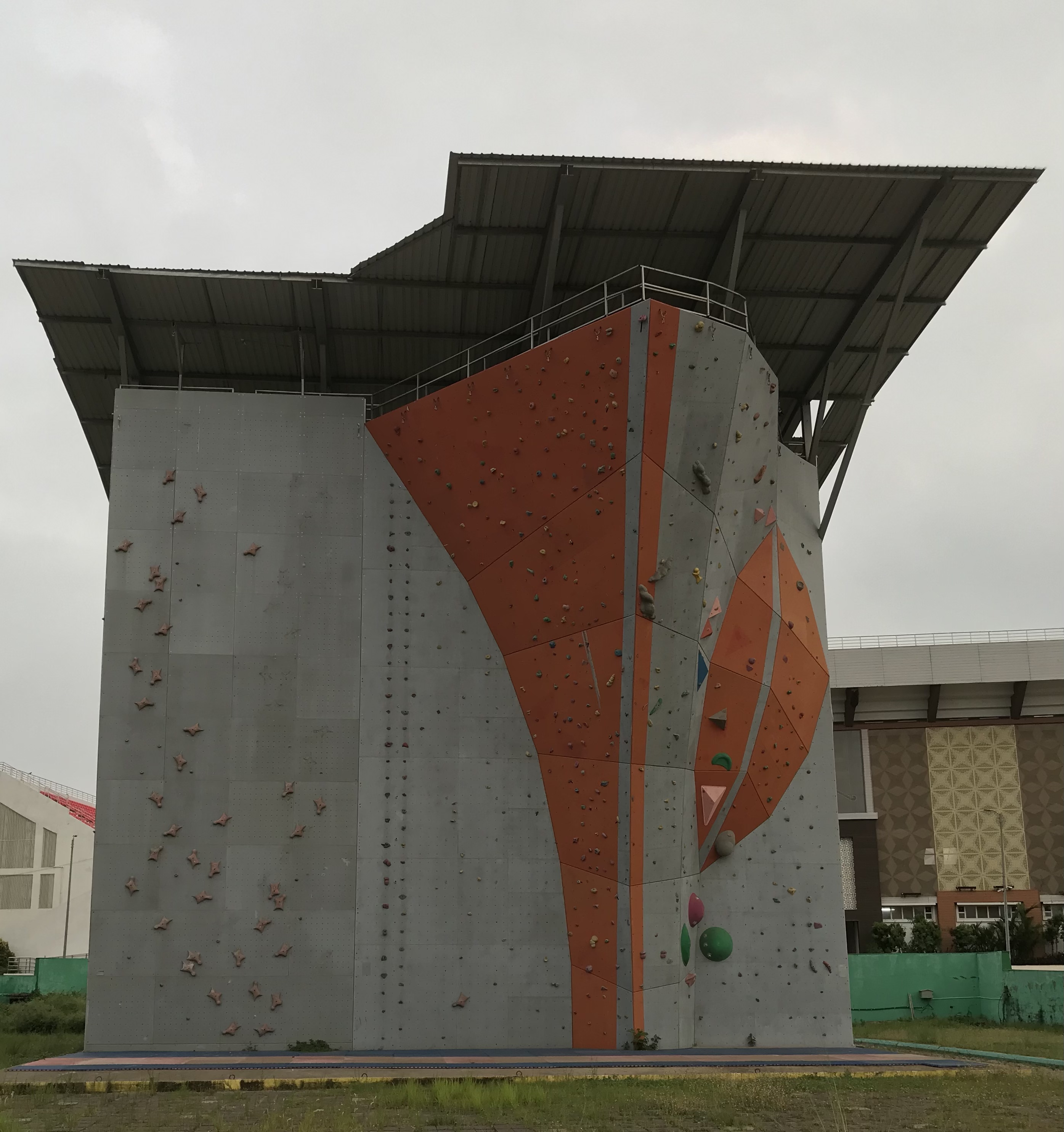
Kalinga Stadium Rock Climbing Centre

The Kalinga Institute of Industrial Technology Stadium commonly KIIT Stadium is a new multipurpose stadium located as a part of Kalinga Institute of Industrial Technology University Campus or KIIT University in Bhubaneswar with a capacity of 40,000.

The 2017 Asian Athletics Championships was the 22nd edition of the Asian Athletics Championships. It was held from 6–9 July 2017 at the Kalinga Stadium. Bhubaneswar is the third Indian city to host the Asian Athletics Championships, with Delhi being the first, in 1989, and Pune, the second, in 2013.

The FIH and the IOA president, Narindar Batra stated in a ceremony that Bhubaneswar is emerging as the new sports capital of India while unveiling the new logo for the Indian hockey team jersey, which is sponsored by the government of Odisha. The state, Batra mentioned, provides equal importance and opportunity for all sports such as cricket, football, field hockey, tennis, badminton, chess and many more.

== Media ==
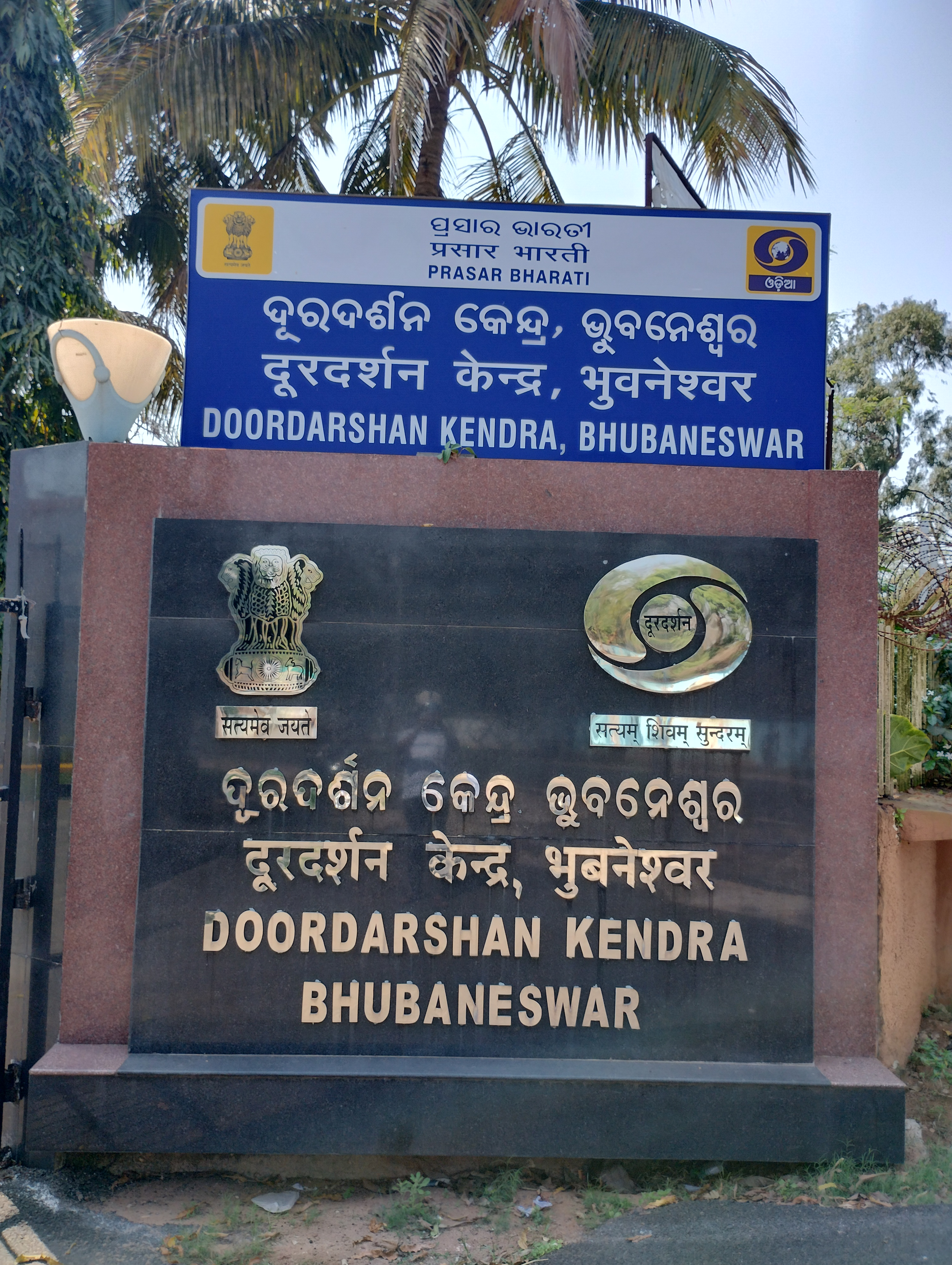
Doordarshan Kendra Bhubaneswar

The city's widely circulated Odia-language newspapers are Sambad, Dharitri, Pragatibadi, Samaja, News 7, Argus, Khabara, Orissa Bhaskara, Prameya and Samaya. Orissa Post and Odia Age are the English-language newspapers that is produced and published from Bhubaneswar. Other popular English-language newspapers published and sold in Bhubaneswar include The Times of India, The Statesman, Hindustan Times, The Hindu, The Indian Express and the Asian Age. Bhubaneswar has substantial circulation of financial dailies, including The Economic Times, The Financial Express, Business Line and Business Standard. Vernacular newspapers, such as those in the Hindi, Bengali and Telugu languages are read by minorities. Major periodicals based in Bhubaneswar include Saptahika Samaya, Saptahika Samaja and Kadambini.

All India Radio, the national state-owned radio broadcaster, airs several AM channels from the radio station located in Cuttack. Bhubaneswar has five local radio stations broadcasting on FM, including two from AIR. India's state-owned television broadcaster Doordarshan Odia provides two free-to-air terrestrial channels, while a mix of Odia, Hindi, English and other regional channels are accessible via cable subscription and direct-broadcast satellite services. Some of the Odia language television channels are Sidarth TV, Manjari, Colors Odia, Sarthak TV and Tarang TV. Odia-language 24-hour television news channels include News 7, Argus, Odisha TV, Kanak TV, ETV News Odia, MBC TV and Naxatra News.

== Notable people ==
The following are some of the notable people associated (i.e. either born or spent a significant part of their life) with Bhubaneswar:

- Subroto Bagchi
- Ranjib Biswal
- Dutee Chand
- Nabakrushna Choudhury
- Ileana Citaristi
- Bidhu Bhusan Das
- Prabhat Nalini Das
- Pankaj Charan Das
- J. B. S. Haldane
- Baidyanath Misra
- B. K. Misra
- Bhubaneswar Mishra
- Bijay Mohanty
- Debashish Mohanty
- Giribala Mohanty
- Gopinath Mohanty
- Saraju Mohanty
- Uttam Mohanty
- Bibhu Mohapatra
- Kelucharan Mohapatra
- Mira Nair
- Oopali Operajita
- Sanjukta Panigrahi
- Ramesh Chandra Parida
- Prasanna Kumar Patasani
- Biju Patnaik
- Janaki Ballabh Patnaik
- Naveen Patnaik
- Sudarsan Pattnaik
- Rakesh Pradhan
- Trilochan Pradhan
- Biswa Kalyan Rath
- Mahasweta Ray
- Tandra Ray
- Archita Sahu
- Salabega
- Achyuta Samanta
- Pathani Samanta
- Helen Spurway

== Sister cities ==
- Cupertino, California, United States
- Bloemfontein, South Africa

== See also ==
- Bhubaneswar ITIR
- Chari Kshetra
- Ghanteswara Siva Temple
- List of neighbourhoods in Bhubaneswar
- List of parks in Bhubaneswar
- List of temples in Bhubaneswar
- List of twin towns and sister cities in India
- Markandeshwar Siva Temple
- Nandankanan Zoological Park
- Sankarananda Matha
- Largest Indian cities by GDP
- Bhimesvara Bisrama ghara
- Chandaka Industrial Estate
