= Ekamra Walks =

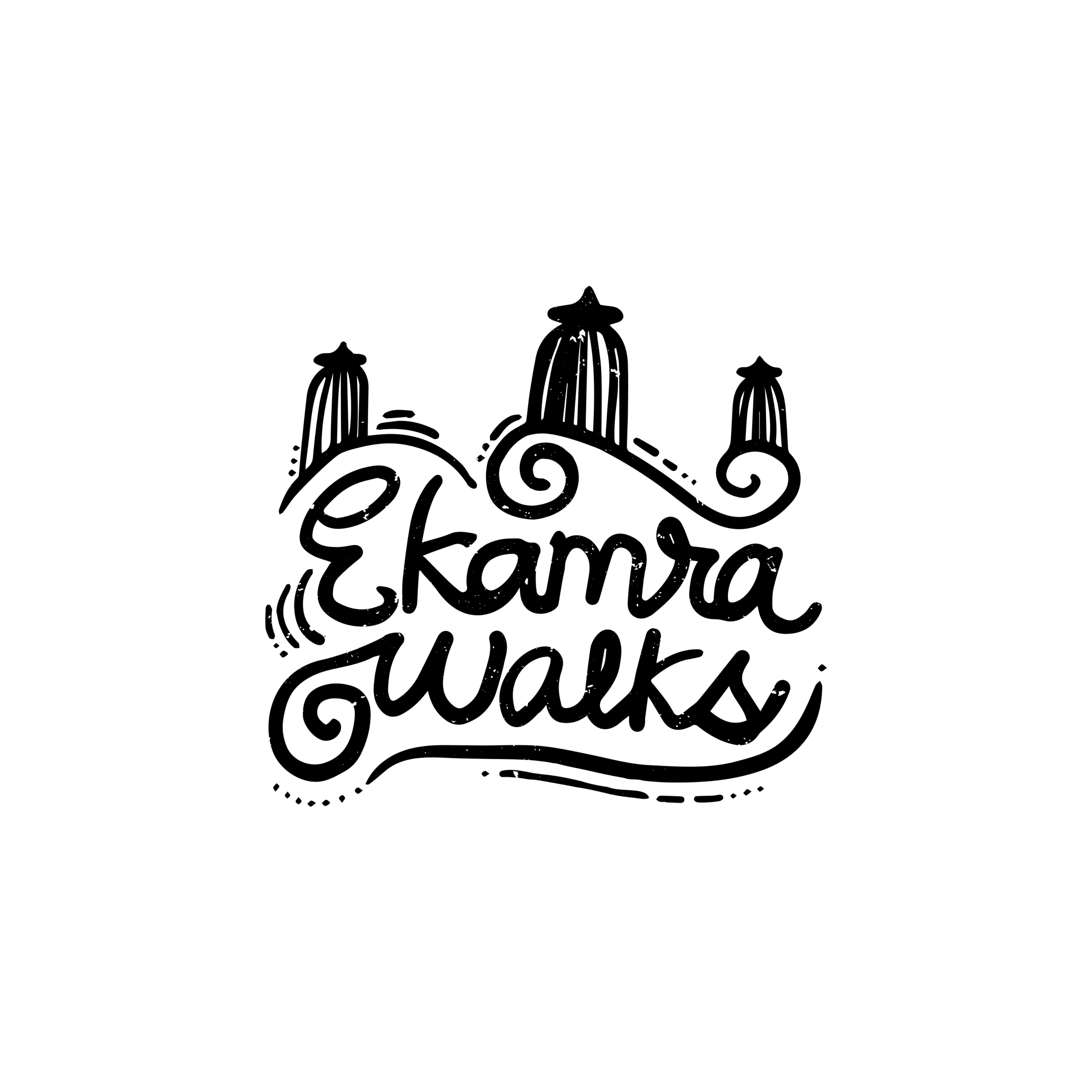
- Type: Heritage Walk
- Founded: 2016
- Founder: Bhubaneswar Development Authority; Bhubaneswar Municipal Corporation
- Headquarters: Bhubaneswar
- Area served: Bhubaneswar
- Products: Tourism
- Revenue: Non-profit organization
- Website: www.ekamra-walks.com

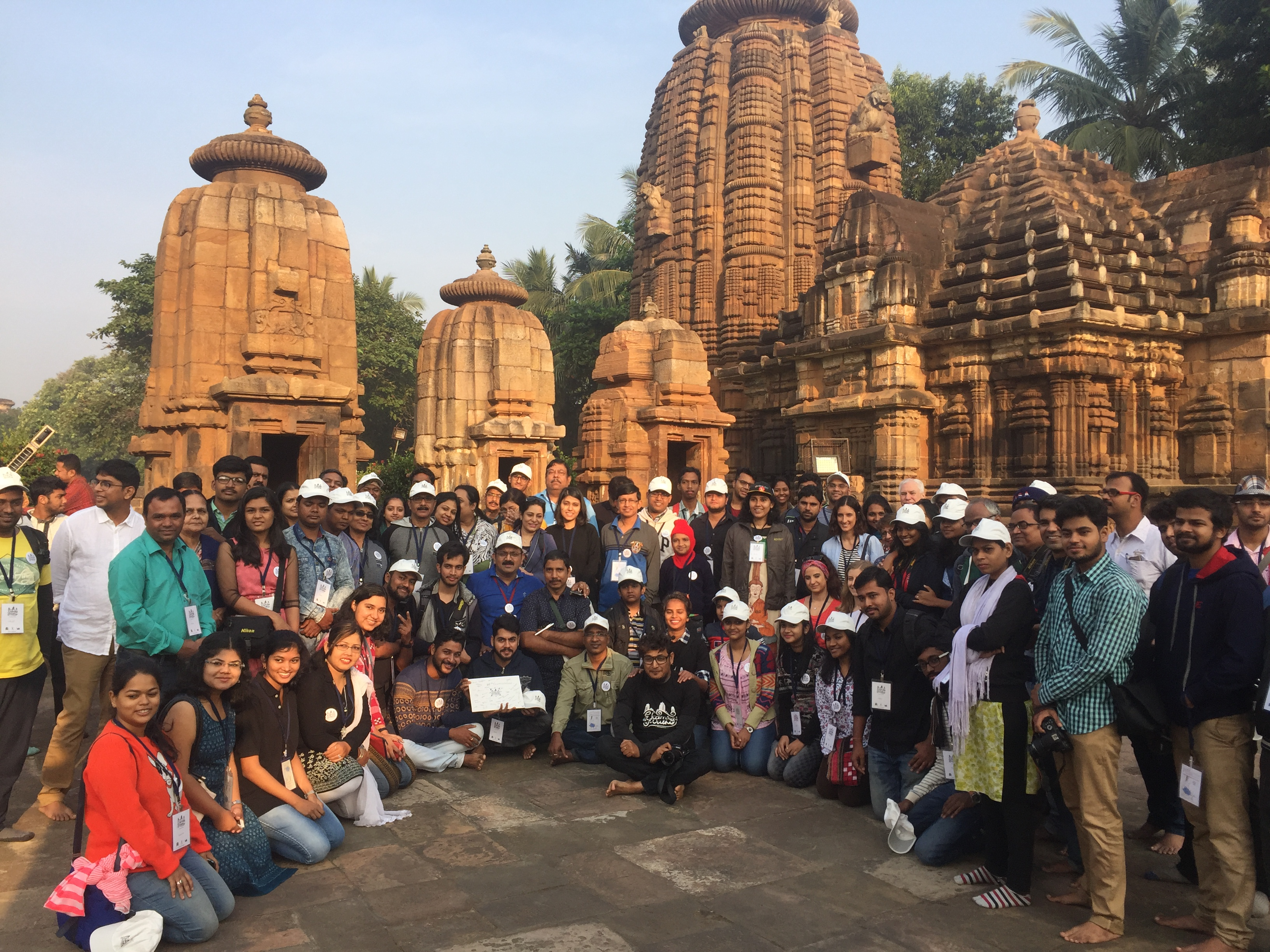
50th Ekamra Walk.

Ekamra Walks is a weekly heritage walk for visitors to explore the heritage trails of Ekamra Kshetra or the temple city of Bhubaneswar. The walk is a non-profit initiative by the unified effort of Bhubaneswar Development Authority and Bhubaneswar Municipal Corporation There are multiple trails conducted by Ekamra Walks across Heritage, Culture & Nature.

Old Town Bhubaneswar, also known as Ekamra Kshetra, is the center of Kalingan temple architecture. In 2014, Ekamra Kshetra earned a place in UNESCO’S tentative list of World Heritage sites. Ekamra Walks, hence borrows its name from “Ekamra Kshetra” and is a paid guided tour for people interested in the history and culture of the land that once hosted more than 7000 temples.

== Trails ==
There are 9 Trails for the year 2025-26. Each of these trails are organised to provide a holistic view of the tempest, art, culture and natural elements of the city.

Ticket prices range from ₹ 100 for most trails to ₹ 200 for Jungle Safari & ₹ 300 for Nocturnal Safari.

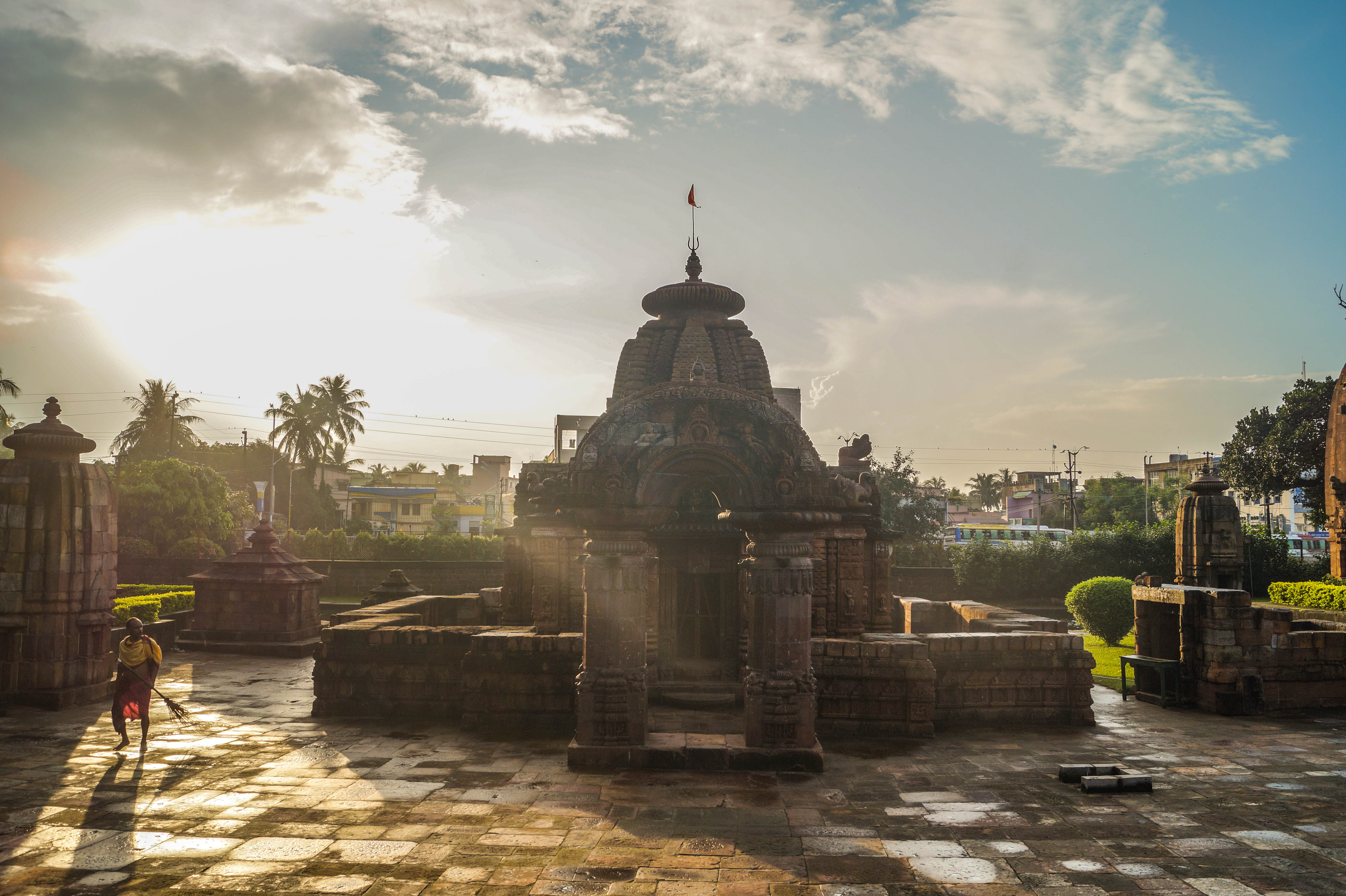
Mukteshvara Temple Complex, Old Town Bhubaneswa

=== Ekamra Heritage Walk – The Living Temple City ===
Destinations Covered:

- Mukteswar Temple (10th century, iconic “gem of Kalingan architecture”)
- Lingaraj Temple (11th century, grand shrine of Lord Shiva)
- Parasurameswar Temple (7th century, oldest surviving shrine in Bhubaneswar)
- Ananta Vasudev Temple (Vaishnavite shrine)
- Chitrakarini Temple
- Bindusagar Lake (ritual center)

Duration: 2–2.5 hours, approx. 2 km distance

Requirements: Moderate fitness (easy to moderate walk), comfortable footwear, camera

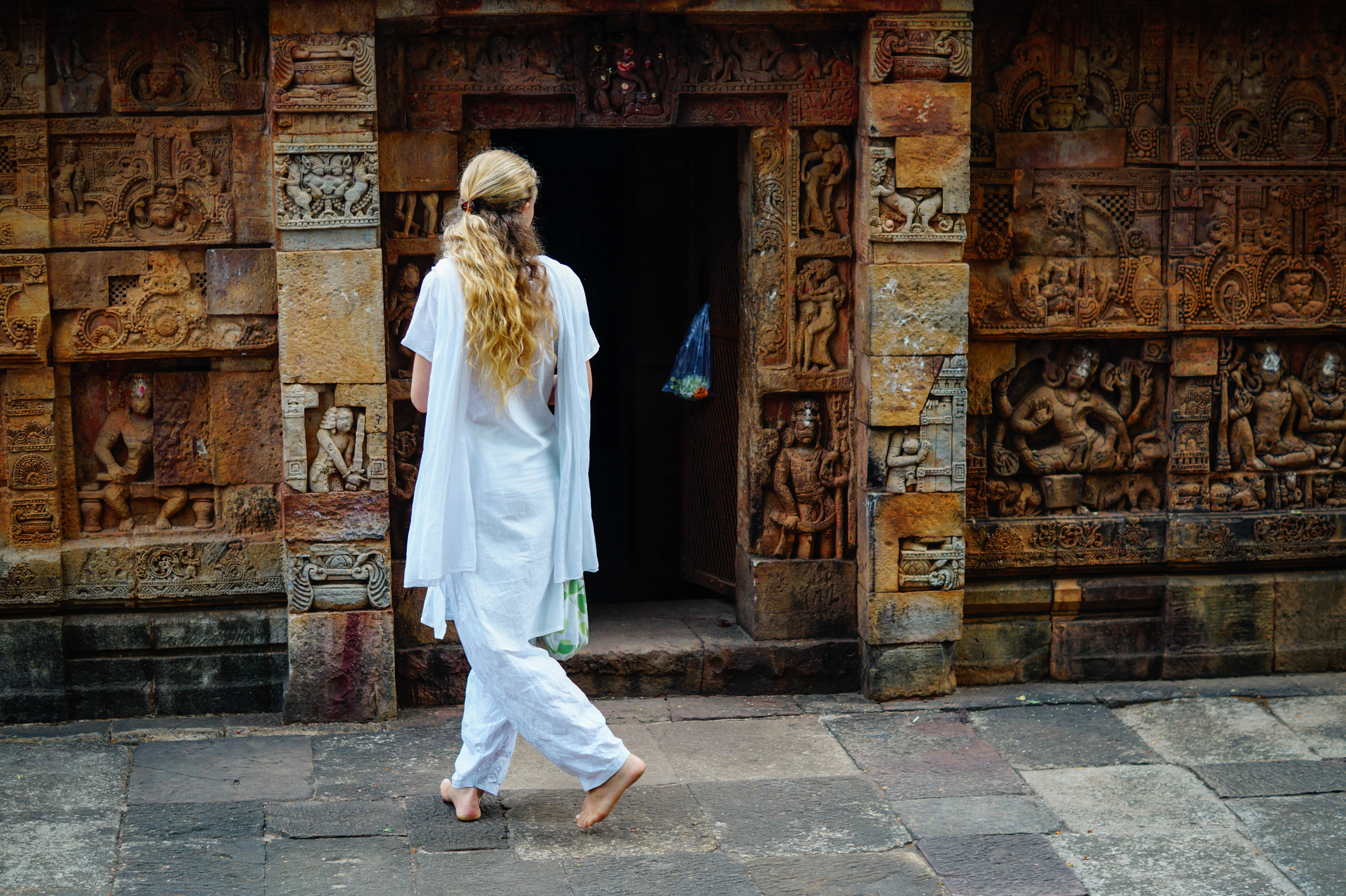

=== Mystical Odyssey – The Shakta Traditions of Bhubaneswar ===
Destinations Covered:

- Chausathi Yogini Temple, Hirapur (unique circular shrine dedicated to 64 Yoginis)
- Baitala Deula (Tantric temple)

Duration: Usually 1.5–2 hours, transport included for outlying sites

Includes: Expert-guided discussion on rituals, symbolism, festival stories, welcome kit

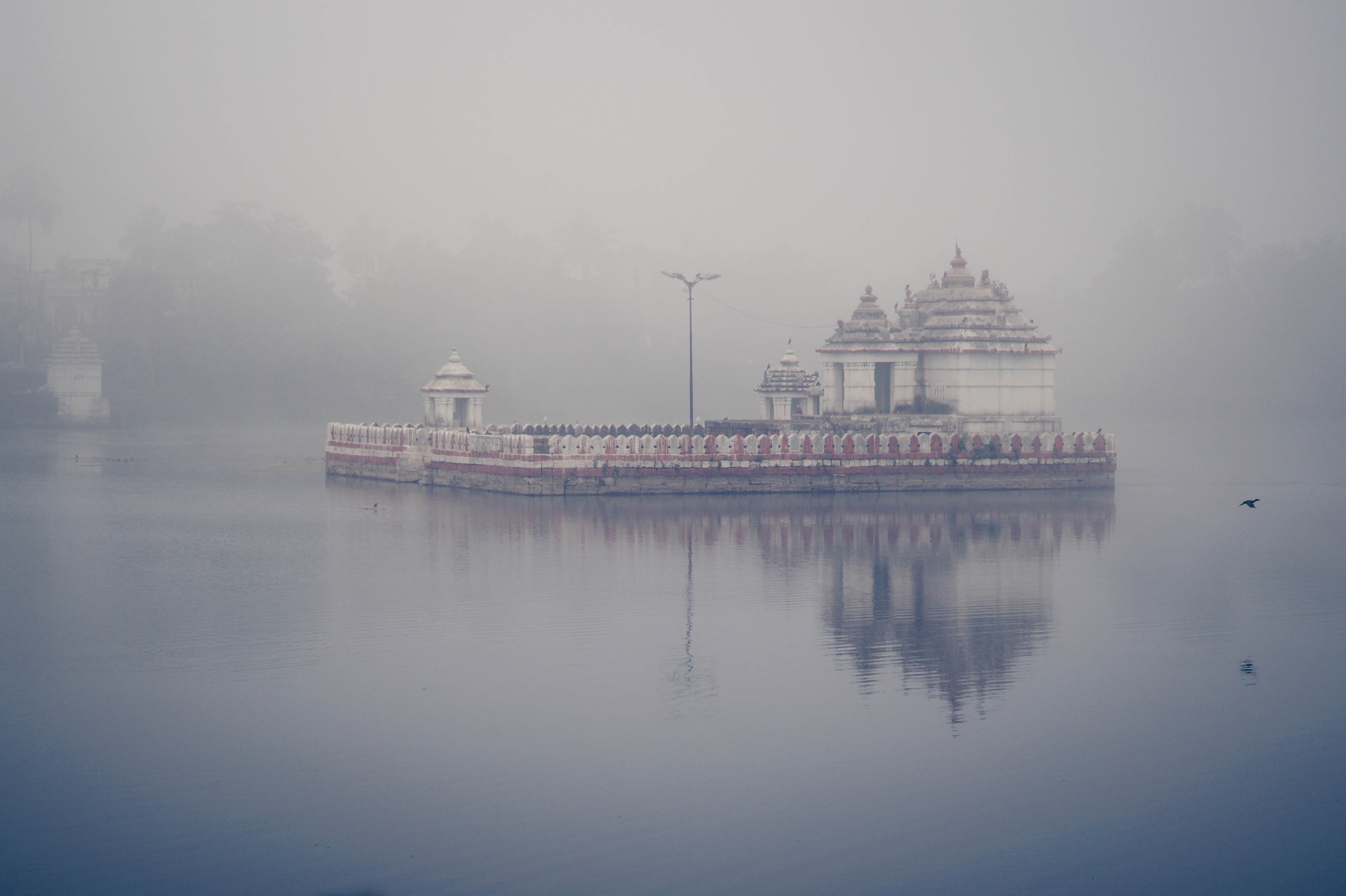
Bindu Sagar Lake, Old Town, Bhubaneswa

=== Spiritual Sojourn – Paths of Harmony ===
Destinations Covered:

- Jain Caves (Udayagiri & Khandagiri – ancient rock-cut caves)
- Bhaskareswara, Brahmeshwara, Rajarani

Duration: 2–2.5 hours, approx. 2 km distance

Requirements: Moderate fitness (easy to moderate walk), comfortable footwear, camera

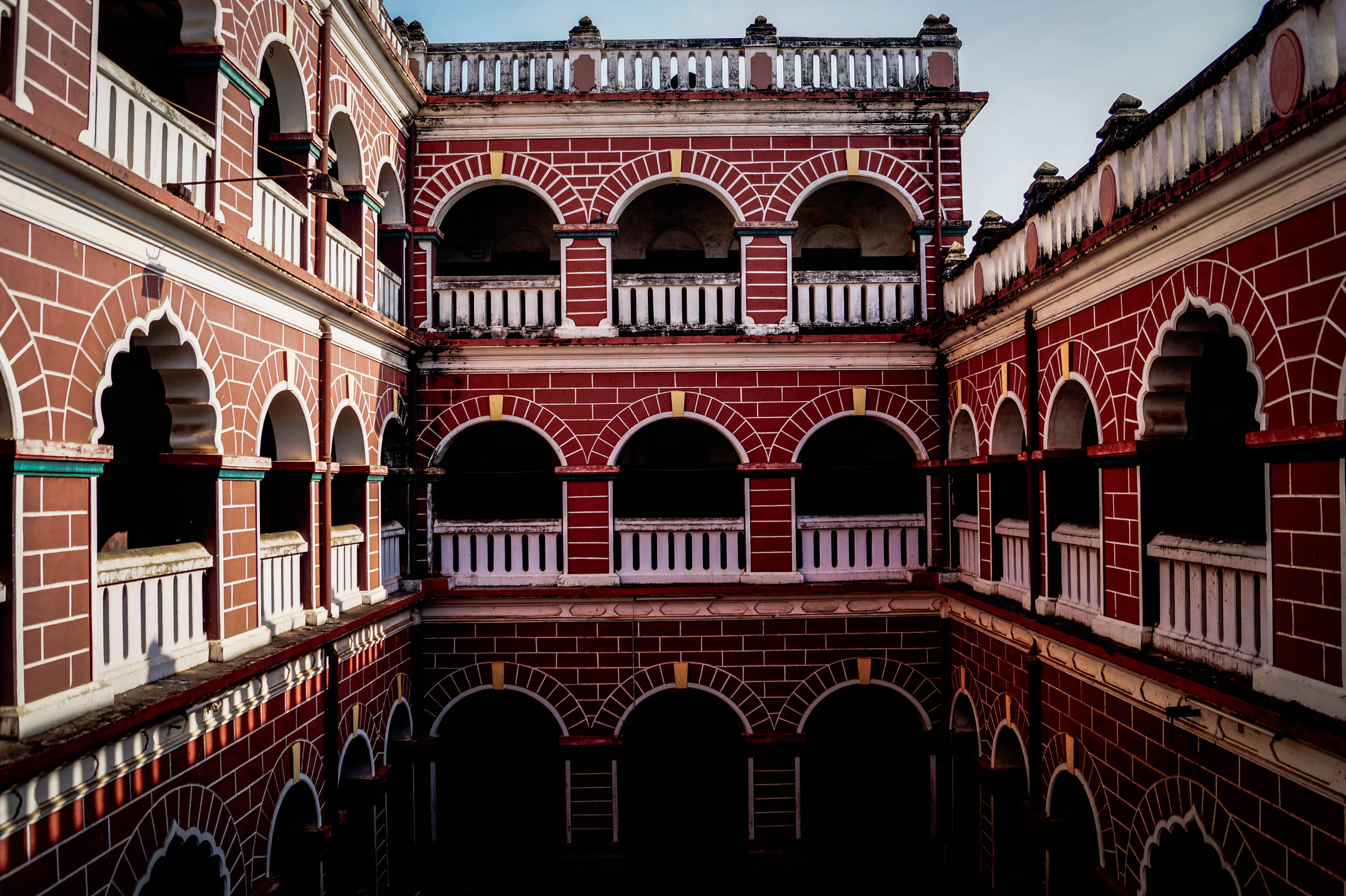
Dharmashala, Old town, Bhubaneswar

=== Walk in Wilderness – The Forest and the City ===
Destinations Covered:

- Deras forest reserve (Biodiversity hotspots, scenic walking trails, water reservoir)
- Observation spots for flora, birds, and wildlife

Duration: 2–2.5 hours, 5 KM brisk walk

Fitness: Easy walk, suitable for most ages

Equipment: Sports shoes, hats, water bottles

Includes: Naturalist guide, eco-friendly walk, group safety measure

=== Jungle Safari / Night Safari ===
Destinations Covered:

- Bharatpur wildlife sanctuary (Tropical forest, migratory birdwatching, small mammal sightings)

Duration: 2 hours

Mode: Vehicle / jeep safari, includes trained spotters & guides

Fitness: Suitable for all

=== Dhauli Peace Walk – From War to Wisdom ===
Destinations Covered:

- Dhauli Hill (site of the Kalinga War, Ashokan Rock Edicts)
- Shanti Stupa (Peace Pagoda)
- Light & Sound Show (ticket price is included)

Duration: 2.5 - 3 hours

Fitness: Short hill climb, accessible for most

Includes: Reflection sessions, guided storytelling, group meditation segment

=== Odia Film Panorama ===
Destinations Covered:

- Classic Odia Movie in an open air theatre + Explainer & Conversations
- Traditional Odia Snacks

Duration: 3 hours

Includes: Interactions, workshops, refreshments, documentation of art processes

=== Odia Literary Trail – Language, Literature & Identity ===
Destinations Covered:

- Introduction to Odia Language by eminent research scholars & writers.
- Mesmerising Odia Fold Dance Performance
- Culturally significant performance of stories

Duration: 2.5 hours

Includes: Expert narrators, Award winning dance performance, immersive story telling & multilingual support
