= Brahma Temple, Bindusagar =

Brahma Temple

Religion
- Affiliation: Hinduism
- Deity: Brahma; Bhuvaneshvari (consort)

Location
- Location: Bhubaneshwar
- State: Odisha
- Country: India
- Interactive map of Brahma Temple
- Coordinates: 20.241950°N 85.835103°E

Architecture
- Completed: 15th/16th century C.E.

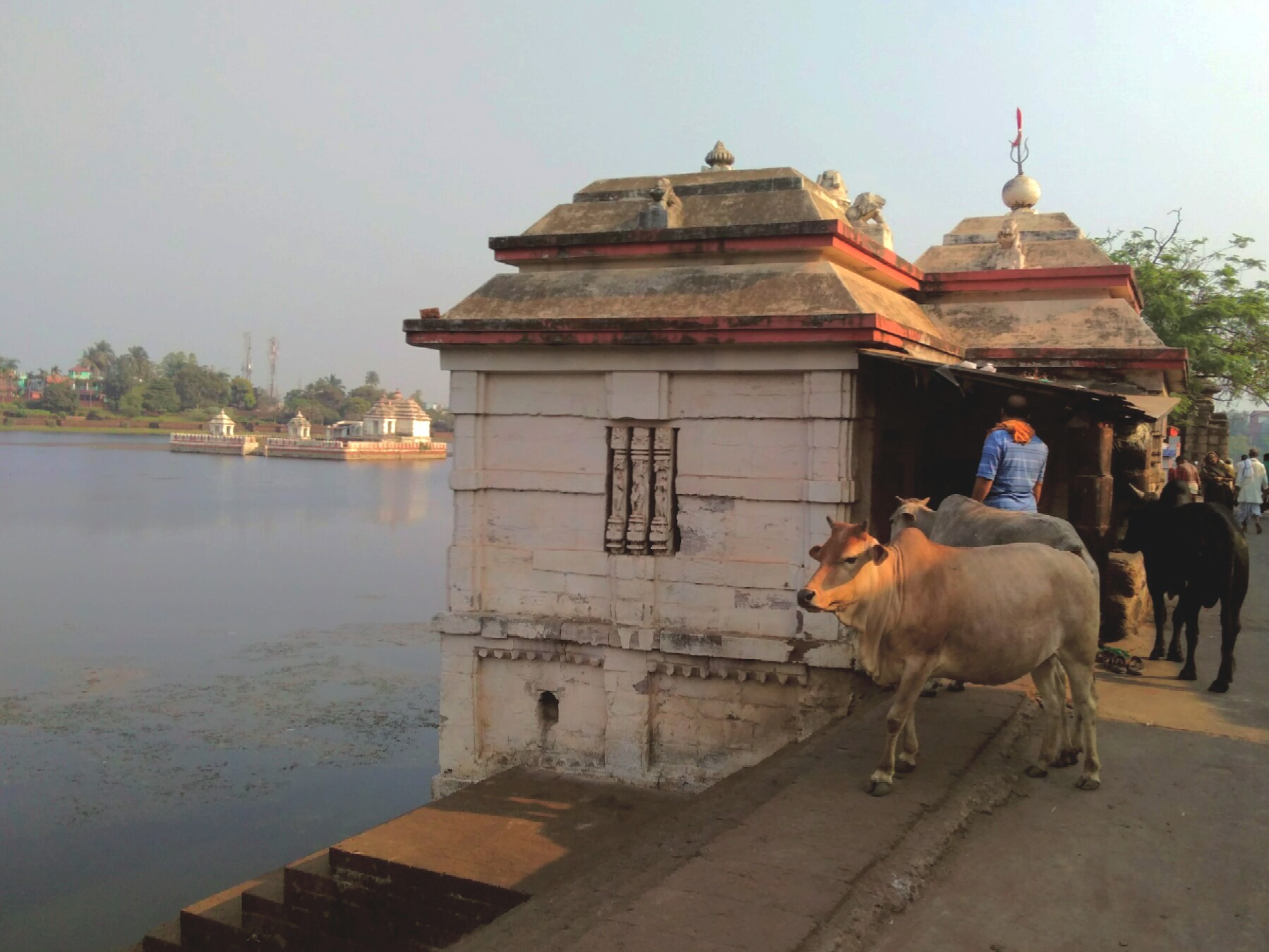
The Brahma Temple in 2017

The Brahma Temple is located on the eastern embankment of the Bindusara River, on the left side road leading from Lingaraj Temple. The temple is surrounded by the Bindusagar Tank on the west in Bhubaneswar, Odisha, India.

== Legend ==
Lord Brahma came to Bhubaneswar to attend the coronation of Lingaraj Deva. Here he was requested to stay forever, but he assured that he will come every year on the month of Chaitra for the Ashokashtami festival. Again he assured that he will be the charioteer (Sarathy) of the Rukuna Rath of Shri Lingaraja. So a temple was erected in honour of him near Bindusagar.

== Architecture ==
The main temple is of late Kalingan style dating back to 15th century. The present temple was built during the Gajapati Rulers. The temple features a four-handed black chlorite image of Brahma. He is holding Veda and water vessel in upper two hands and rosary, abhaya mudra in lower two hands. A visit to Lingaraj Temple is incomplete without visiting this temple and Ananta Vasudeva Temple. Currently the daily worship is done by Brahmins belonging to Panda family.

== See also ==
- Brahma Temple at Pushkar
- List of temples in Bhubaneswar
