= Ekamra =

Ekamra may refer to:

- Ekamra-Bhubaneswar, a Vidhan Sabha constituency of Khordha district, Odisha, India
- Ekamra Kanan, a botanical garden in Bhubaneswar, India
- Ekamra Manoranjan TV, Odia language cable television channel
- Ekamra Walks, a weekly heritage walk organised in Bhubaneswar, Odisha
- Nilachakra Ekamra, Odia language cable television channel
