= Ward No. 1, Bhubaneswar Municipal Corporation =

WARD NO 0001
- Bhubaneswar Municipal Corporation
- Location within Odisha
- Coordinates: 20.36°N 85.81°E
- Country: India
- State: Odisha
- City: Bhubaneshwar
- Localities: Prasanti Vihar, Prasanti Vihar HB Area (Pt.), Chirakhal Toli Slum, Info City area, KIIT Hostel, Western Apartment, Aryapalli, Maruti Vihar, Trishna Enclave, Adarsha Vihar, Sikharchandi Cluster-I &III, Patia Big Bazar Area .
- Elevation: 26 m (85 ft)

Population (2011)
  - Total: 47,574
- Time zone: UTC+5:30 (IST)
- Vehicle registration: OD-33
- Website: www.bmc.gov.in

Ward 1 is a ward in Bhubaneswar Municipal Corporation of Khordha district, Odisha, India.

== Administration ==
Wards in Bhubaneswar is managed by councillor who is elected by the residents of that ward.

Ward no. 1 covers following of the localites:

- Prasanti Vihar
- Prasanti Vihar hb area
- Chirakhal Toli
- Infocity
- KIIT Hostel
- Aryapali
- Maruti Vihar
- Trishna Enclave
- Adarsha Vihar
- Sikhar Chandi
- Cluster 1 and 3
- Patia Bara Bazar Area

Source: Bhubaneswar M. Corp Government

== Demographics ==
As of 2011 census, Ward number 1 had a population of 47,574 people, with 26,604 being males and 20,970 being females, making the sex ratio of 1.27 males per female. Children (0–6) population is 3,677, making 7.73% of the population. The literacy rate is 85.33%, with Male literacy being 87.63% and Female literacy is 82.43%. The ward has a scheduled tribe population of 11,044 and a scheduled caste population of 1,980. Number of Households is 7,338.
