= Bindusagar Lake =

Lake in Odisha, India

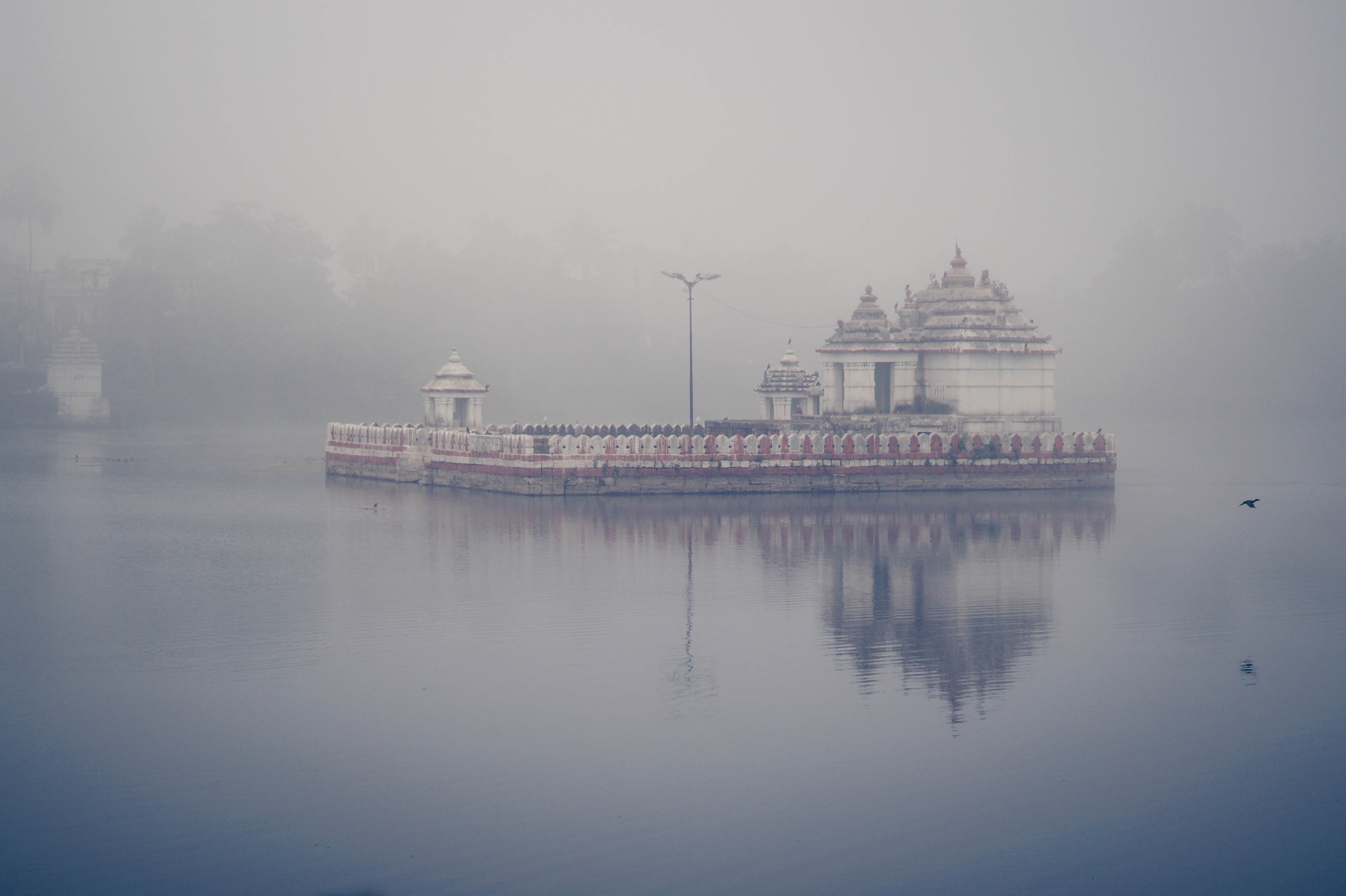

- Location within Odisha
- Location: Ekamra Kshetra, Old town, Bhubaneshwar, Odisha
- Coordinates: 20.2421°N 85.8352°E

Bindusagar Lake is located in the right side of the Talabazar road leading from Kedargouri Chowk to Lingaraja Temple, Old Town, Bhubaneswar. This road is also known as Bindusagar Road. It is now under the care and maintenance of Lingaraja Temple Administration. The tank is enclosed within a masonry embankment made of dressed laterite blocks. It is the largest water body of Bhubaneswar. All the rituals of Lord Lingarajaa are closely associated with this lake.

== Tradition and legends ==
According to the local tradition, the deities Shiva and Parvati after their marriage came to Varanasi (Kashi). But with the passage of time, Varanasi became a populated area. Shiva moved to Ekamrakshetra (Bhubaneshwar) for meditation in disguise, without the knowledge of Parvati. It was thus known as Gupta-Kashi ("hidden Varanasi"). Ekamrakshetra had a single huge mango tree surrounded by the jungle.

With the aid of the God Brahma, Parvati learned of Shiva's whereabouts in Ekamrakshetra. She noticed that thousands of cows are going under the huge mango tree and automatically milking at a place. Parvati realized that Shiva was there. So she took care of the cows as a milkmaid. The place from which the cows were coming is known as Gosagaresvar.

The two demons Kirti and Vasa got attracted to Parvati and proposed to her. The agitated goddess killed the demons by pressing them into the ground with her feet at a place now known as Devi Padahara. After killing the demons, Parvati became tired and took rest at a place called Bhabani Shankar Temple. Parvati felt thirsty and to quench her thirst Shiva struck his trident at this place, out of which a spring came out. The water was then sanctified by the waters of all rivers, streams and ultimately took the shape of a large water body, which came to be known as Bindusagar.

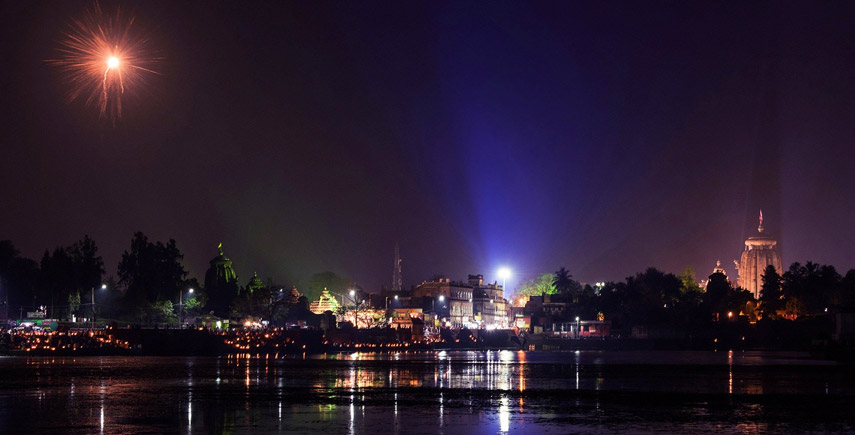
Light and Sound show in Bindusagar lake

== History ==
- Approximate date: 7th / 8th century A.D.
- Source of Information: Because the temples of both formative phase to final phase are found on its embankments, the tank precedes them.

== Physical description ==
- Surrounding: The tank has embankments on all the four sides. The temple of Ananta Vasudeva stands on the eastern embankment across the road, Mohini temple in southern embankment at a distance of 13 m (43 ft), Markandesvara temple in south-eastern embankment within a distance of 20 m (66 ft), Uttaresvara temple precinct in northern embankments.
- Orientation: Bathing ghats are provided with steps made of large size laterite blocks in all sides.
- Architectural features (Plan and Elevation): Rectangular on plan measuring 450 m (1,480 ft) in length, 175 m (574 ft) in breadth and 7 m (23 ft) in depth. At the centre of the tank there is a pidha shrine what the locals call as Jagati. During the Chandan Yatra, held in the month of May, Lord Lingaraja visits the shrine by navigating through a boat. Chandan Yatra is the main function of the tank associated with Lord Lingaraja.
- Decorative features: The tank is surrounded by a series of shrines. Eastern embankment: Dwarabasini, Ananta Vasudeva, Brahma, Hanuman etc. Western Embankments: Lingaraja rest house, Nilakanthesvara, Akhadachandi, Paschimesvara and Markandesvara Temple.Northern embankments: Uttaresvara Temple precinct, Emara Matha, Southern embankment: Swarnadhiswara Bhabanisankar, Sari deula, Mohini temple, Akhandalamani / Panchanana etc.
- Building material: Dressed laterite blocks.
- Construction techniques: Dry masonry
- Special features, if any: It is fed by a natural spring from the underground. The excess and waste water is discharged through an outlet channel in the southeastern wall, beneath the Talabazar road near Dalmiya Dharmasala. The outlet channel measures 1.18 m (3.9 ft) in height and 1.07 m (3.5 ft)in width. As a result, the water level of the tank remains constant throughout the year. Despite such provisions made in the past to keep the tank water clean and fresh now the water is one of the most polluted among the water bodies in the city, which need special care and attention.
