= Bhubaneswar Municipal Corporation =

Local civic body in Bhubaneswar, Odisha, India

Type
- Type: Municipal Corporation

History
- Founded: 1994

Leadership
- Mayor: Sulochana Das
- Deputy Mayor: Manjulata Kanhar
- Municipal Commissioner: Chanchal Rana, IAS

Structure
- Seats: 67
- Political groups: Government (48): BJD (48); Opposition (10): BJP (10); Others (9): IND (9)

Motto
- Progress through Partnership for better Bhubaneswar

Meeting place
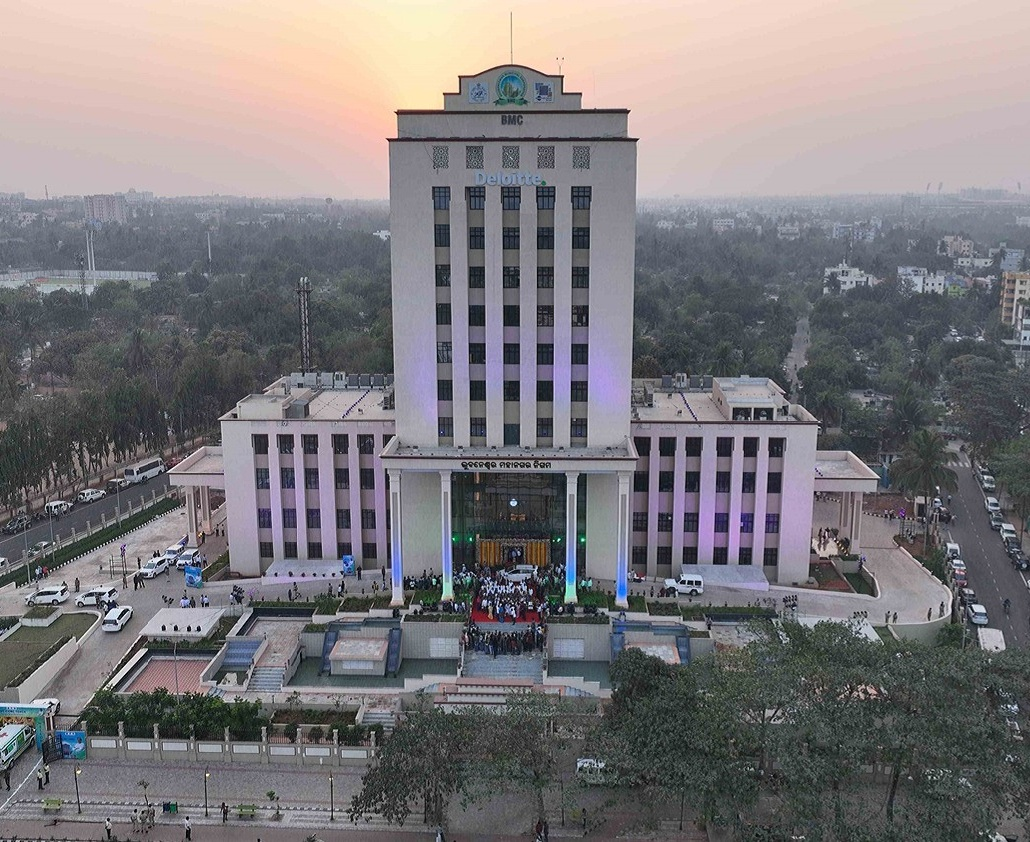

Website
- www.bmc.gov.in

The Bhubaneswar Municipal Corporation (BMC) is the local urban governing body of the city of Bhubaneswar in the Indian state of Odisha. The municipal corporation consists of democratically elected members, is headed by a mayor and administers the city's infrastructure and public services. This civic administrative body administers an area of 161 km^{2} (62 sq mi).

The Bhubaneswar Municipal Corporation was established in 1994. The city is divided into 67 administrative wards and 46 Revenue Villages. Each ward elects a councillor to the BMC. By means of the standing committees, the corporation undertakes urban planning and maintains roads, government-aided schools, hospitals and municipal markets. As Bhubaneswar's apex body, the corporation discharges its functions through the mayor-in-council, which comprises a mayor, a deputy mayor, and other elected members of the BMC. The functions of the BMC include water supply, drainage and sewerage, sanitation, solid waste management, street lighting and building regulation. Another ancillary civic body is the Bhubaneswar Development Authority (BDA), which is responsible for the statutory planning and development of the Greater Bhubaneswar area.

== Revenue sources ==
The following are the income sources for the corporation from the Central and State Government.

=== Revenue from taxes ===
Following is the Tax related revenue for the corporation.

- Property tax.
- Profession tax.
- Entertainment tax.
- Grants from Central and State Government like Goods and Services Tax.
- Advertisement tax.

=== Revenue from non-tax sources ===
Following is the Non Tax related revenue for the corporation.

- Water usage charges.
- Fees from Documentation services.
- Rent received from municipal property.
- Funds from municipal bonds.

== Achievements ==
Achievement	Year	By	Remark
Global Sustainability & Innovation Awards	2026		
Swachh Vayu Survekshan - 4th Best City	2025	Ministry of Environment, Forest and Climate Change (MOEF&CC), GoI	<10 lakh population category
Swachh Survekshan Awards (9th edition) - 9th Rank	2024-25	Ministry of Housing and Urban Affairs (MoHUA), GoI	recognized as "Promising Swachh Shehar" for the notable progress in urban sanitation in the State of Odisha
United Nations Sasakawa Award	2011	United Nations	Adopting Upgraded Disaster Risk Reduction Mechanism
Municipal Corporation Awards	2011	Housing and Urban Development	Best Municipal Corporation in 2011
Janaagraha Urban G2C (Government to Citizen) Award 2012	2012	C S M Technologies	Best Website Under 1 Million Category

== Services ==
BMC has undertaken pioneering work in various fields and perceives its role as principal provider of services as detailed below to provide a better quality of life to the Bhubaneswarites.

- Health & Sanitation
- Slum Development
- Disaster Management
- City Beautification
- Citizen Services
- Efficient Solid Waste Management
- Underground Sewerage System
- Efficient Urban Planning and Development
- Water Supply Services
- City Bus Services
- Online Services
- Vending Zones
- Parking Zones

Particulars of each of the service undertaken by BMC

- Marriage Registration Certificate
- Issue of Birth & Death Certificate
- Timely Grievance redressal system through Mobile App.
- Online Booking of Kalyan Mandap
- Online Booking of Mahajatra Vehicle
- Citizen Grievance
- Water Tanker Reservation
- Booking of Cess pool emptier
- Implementation of Swachha Bhubaneswar Abhijan

== Organization structure ==
Organization Structure for Bhubaneswar Municipal Corporation

== Boundaries ==
- North Side - Patia, Mancheswara.
- East Side - Palasuni, Jharapara, Laxmisagara, Badagarh, Tankapani Rd.
- South Side - Samantarapur, Bhimatangi, Pokhariput, Aerodrome area, Baramunda.
- West Side - Baramunda, Nuapalli, Salia Sahi.
