= Lingaraja Temple =

Hindu temple in Odisha, India

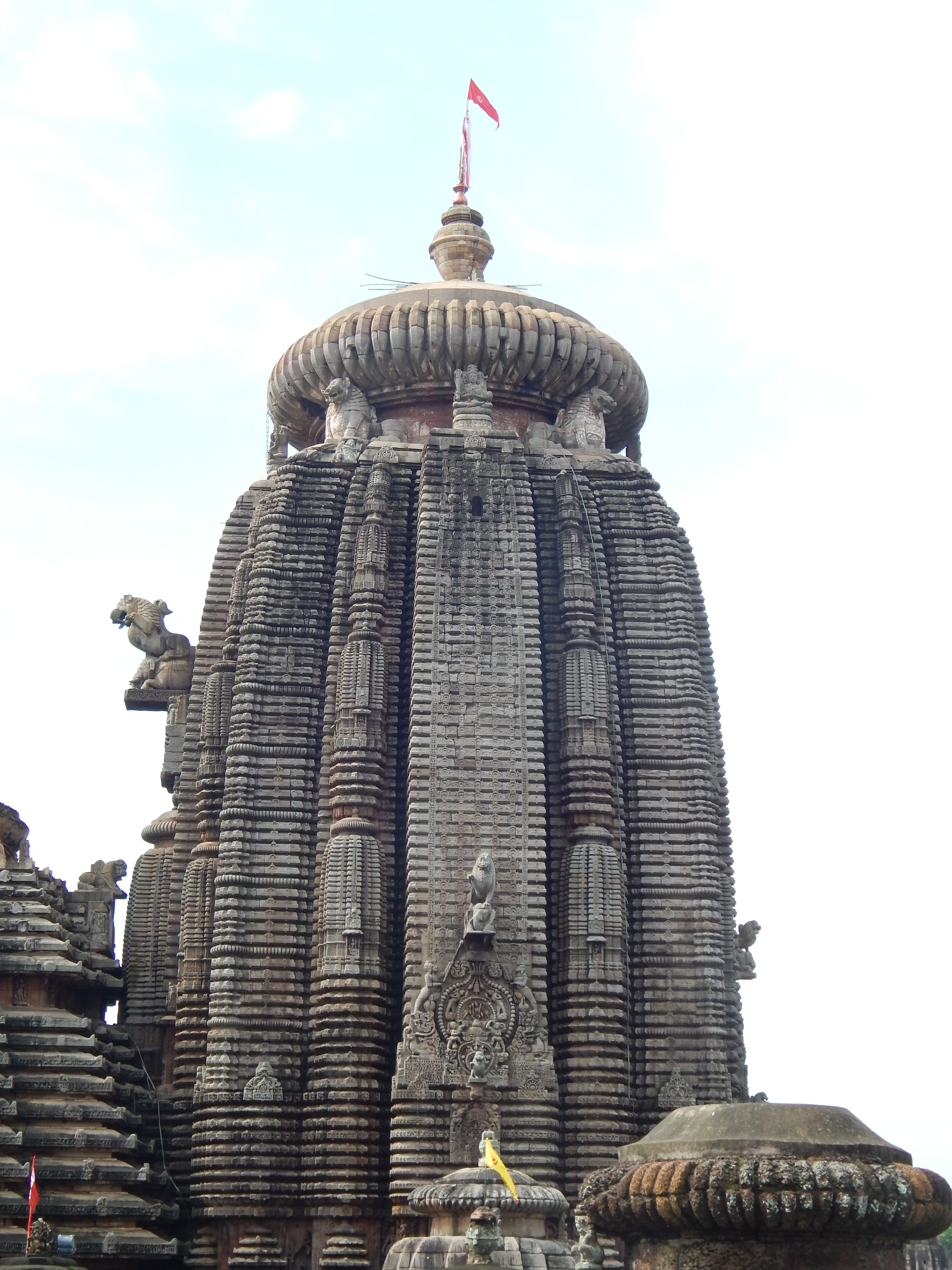
- Shri Lingaraja Temple

- Location in Odisha Lingaraja Temple (India) Lingaraja Temple (Asia)

Religion
- Affiliation: Hinduism
- District: Khurda
- Deity: Shiva As Lingaraja Parvati (consort)
- Festivals: Shivaratri, Ashokastami

Location
- Location: Ekamra Kshetra, Old Town, Bhubaneshwar
- State: Odisha
- Country: India
- Coordinates: 20°14′18″N 85°50′01″E

Architecture
- Type: Kalinga Architecture
- Creator: Jajati Keshari
- Completed: 11th century CE

Lingaraja Temple (Odia: [liŋɡɔraːd͡ʒɔ]) is a Hindu temple dedicated to Shiva and is one of the oldest temples in Bhubaneswar, the capital of the Indian state of Odisha, India. The temple is the most prominent landmark of Bhubaneswar city and one of the major tourist attractions of the state. Shiva's consort and the temple's presiding Goddess, Parvati, is referred to as Annapurna or Girija.

The Lingaraja temple is the largest temple in Bhubaneswar. The central tower of the temple is 180 ft (55 m) tall. The temple represents the quintessence of the Kalinga architecture and culminating the medieval stages of the architectural tradition at Bhubaneswar. The temple is believed to be built by the kings from the Somavamsi dynasty, with later additions from the Ganga rulers. The temple is built in the Deula style that has four components namely, vimana (structure containing the sanctum), jagamohana (assembly hall), natamandira (festival hall) and bhoga-mandapa (hall of offerings), each increasing in the height to its predecessor. The temple complex has 108 other shrines and is enclosed by a large compound wall.

Bhubaneswar is called the Ekamra Kshetra as the deity of Lingaraja was originally under a mango tree (Ekamra) as noted in Ekamra Purana, a 13th-century Sanskrit treatise. The temple is active in worship practices, unlike most other temples in Bhubaneswar. The temple has images of Vishnu, possibly because of the rising prominence of Jagannath sect emanating from the Ganga rulers who built the Jagannath Temple in Puri in the 12th century. The central deity of the temple, Lingaraja, is worshipped as Shiva.

Lingaraja temple is maintained by the Temple Trust Board and the Archaeological Survey of India (ASI). The temple has an average of 6,000 visitors per day and receives hundreds of thousands of visitors during festivals. Shivaratri festival is the major festival celebrated in the temple and event during 2012 witnessed 200,000 visitors. The temple compound is not open to non-Hindus, but there is a viewing platform beside the wall offering a good view of the main exteriors. This was originally erected for a visit by Lord Curzon, the then Viceroy.

== History ==
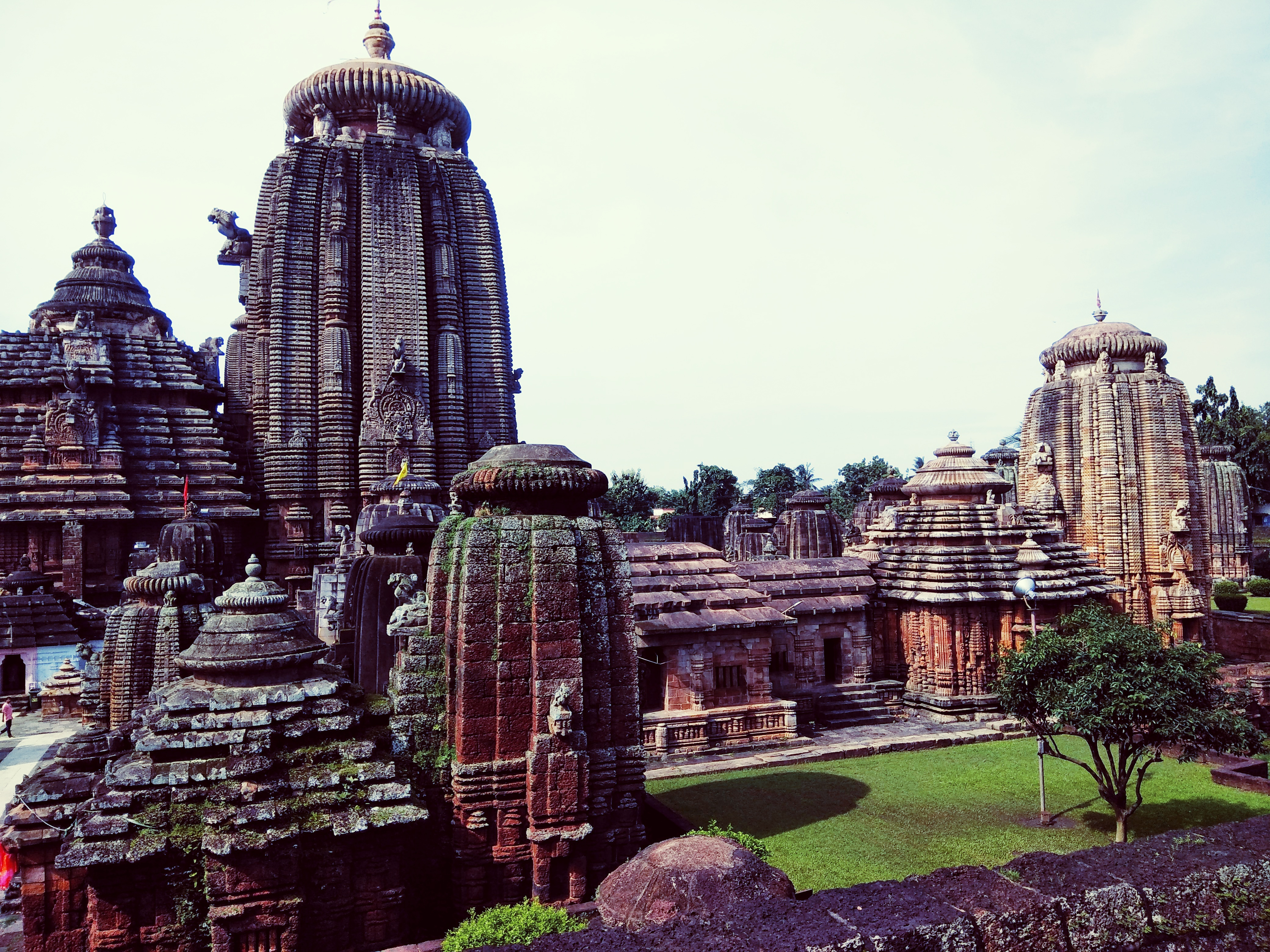
View into the compound from the viewing platform. The main vimana is at left; the second large temple is dedicated to Maa Parvati.

The temple in its present form dates back to the last decade of the eleventh century. There is evidence that part of the temple was built during the sixth century CE as mentioned in some of the seventh century Sanskrit texts. Fergusson believes that the temple might have been initiated by Lalat Indu Keshari who reigned from 615 to 657 CE. The Assembly hall (jagamohana), sanctum and temple tower were built during the eleventh century, while the Hall of offering (bhoga-mandapa) was built during the twelfth century. The natamandira was built by the wife of Salini between 1099 and 1104 CE. Although Odisha was primarily a Shaiva area before the 12th century, by the time the Lingaraja temple was completely constructed, the Jagannath (known then as Purushottam) sect had been growing in the region, and was "raised to the status of an Imperial cult" by the construction of the Jagannath Temple at Puri by Anantavarman Chodaganga.

As per some accounts, the temple is believed to have been built by the Somavanshi king Yayati I (1025–1040), during the 11th century CE. Jajati Keshari shifted his capital from Jajpur to Bhubaneswar which was referred to as Ekamra Kshetra in the Brahma Purana, an ancient scripture. One of the Somavamsi queens donated a village to the temple and the Brahmins attached to the temple received generous grants. An inscription from the Saka year 1094 (1172 CE) indicates gifts of gold coins to the temple by Rajaraja II. Another inscription of Narasimha I from the 11th century indicates offer of beetel leaves as tambula to the presiding deity. Other stone inscriptions in the temple indicate royal grants from Chodaganga to the nearby village people.

K.C. Panigrahi mentions that Yayti I had no time to build the temple and it should have been initiated by his sons Ananta Kesari and Udyota Kesari (believed to be other names of Yayati II as well). The argument provided against the view is that is his weak successors could not have constructed such a magnificent structure.

== Architecture ==
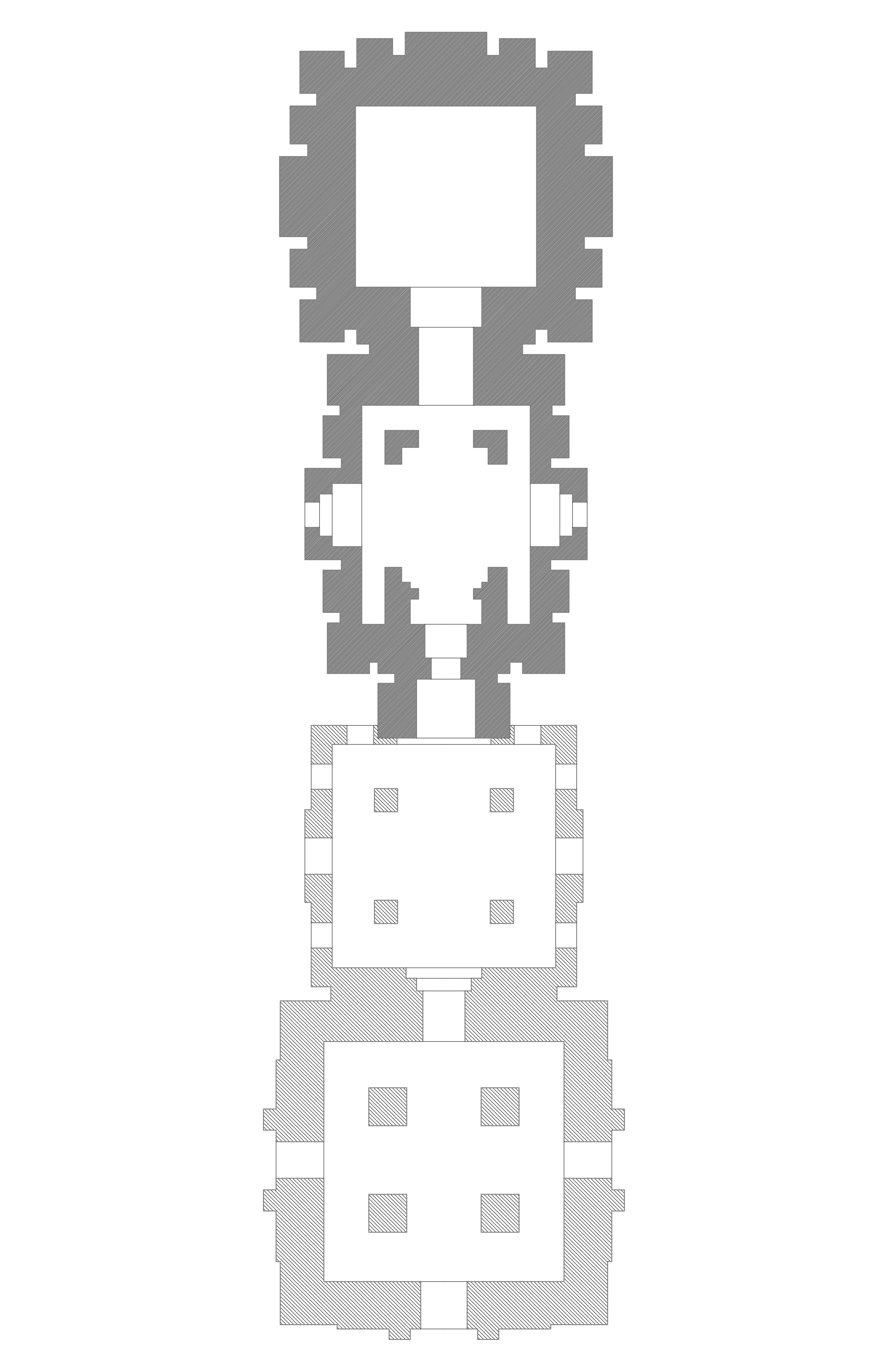
Lingaraja temple has a square plan; section from the top vimana (sanctum), jagamohana (assembly hall), natamandira (festival hall) and bhoga-mandapa (hall of offerings)

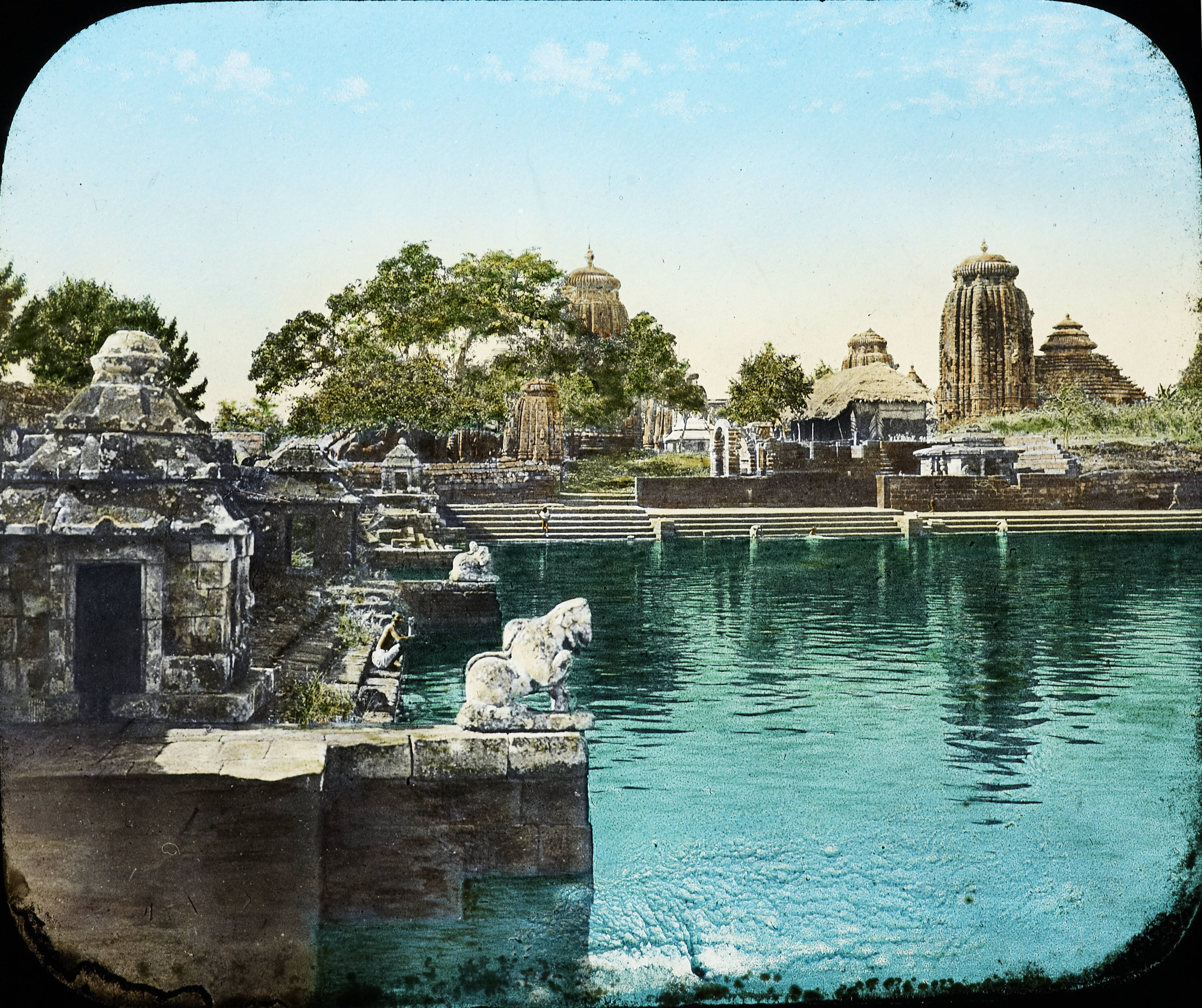
Tinted lantern slide showing a water scene in Bhubaneswar, c. 1906. The slide comes from a collection created by missionaries of the Regions Beyond Missionary Union, active in northeast India and Nepal.

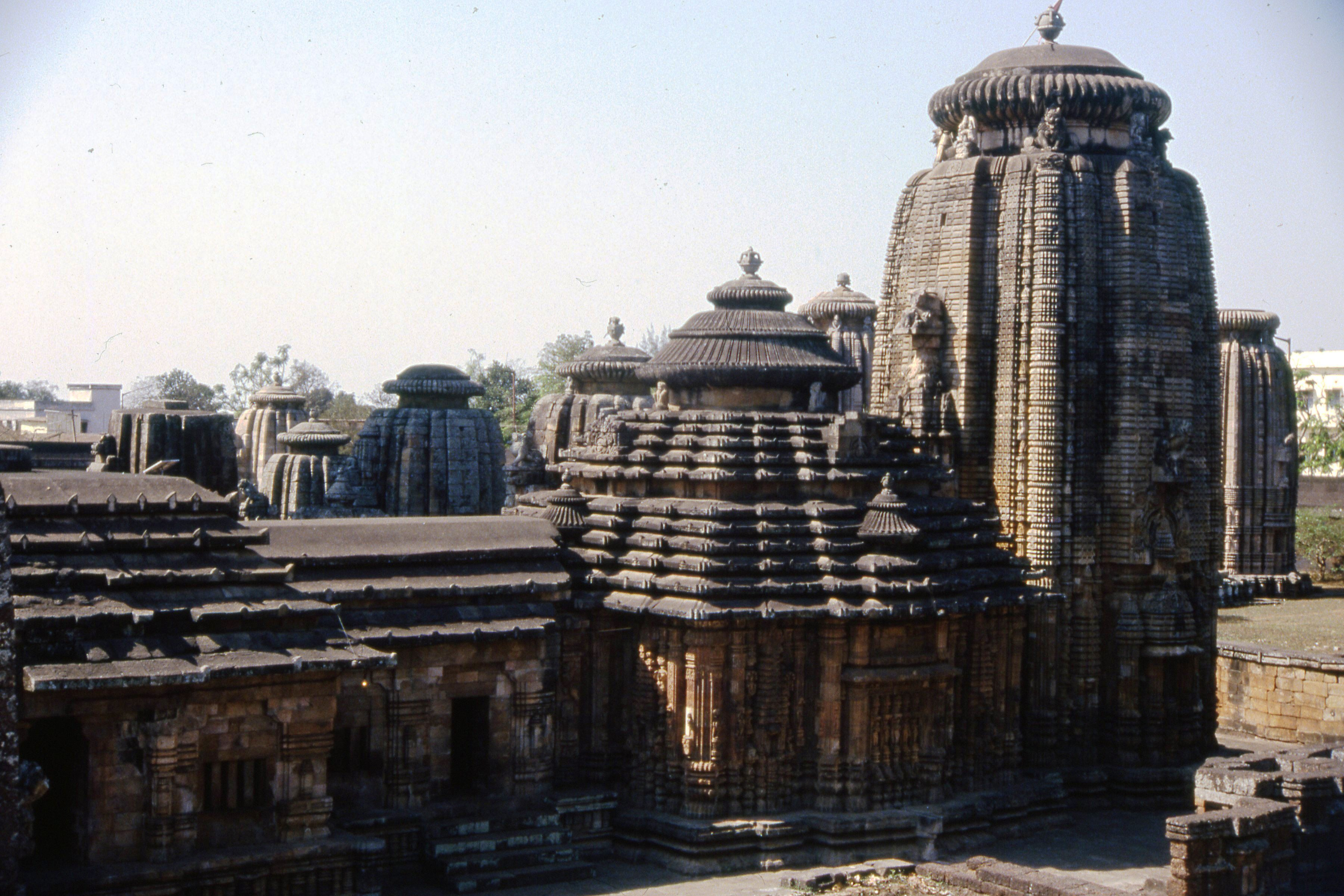
The Maa Parvati temple

The Lingaraja temple is the largest temple in Bhubaneswar. James Fergusson (1808–86), a noted critic and historian rated the temple as "one of the finest examples of purely Hindu temple in India". It is enshrined within a spacious compound wall of laterite measuring 520 ft (160 m) by 465 ft (142 m). The wall is 7.5 ft (2.3 m) thick and surmounted by a plain slant coping. Alongside the inner face of the boundary wall, there is a terrace to protect the compound wall against outside aggression. The tower is 45.11 m (148.0 ft) high and the complex has 150 smaller shrines in its spacious courtyard. Each inch of the 55 m (180 ft) tall tower is sculpted. The door in the gate of the entrance porch is made of sandalwood.

The Lingaraja temple faces east and is built of Khondalite and laterite. The main entrance is located in the east, while there are small entrances in the north and south. The temple is built in the Deula style that has four components namely, vimana (structure containing the sanctum), jagamohana (assembly hall), natamandira (festival hall) and bhoga-mandapa (hall of offerings), with all four in axial alignment with descending height. The dance hall was associated with the raising prominence of the devadasi system that existed during the time. The various units from the Hall of offering to the tower of the sanctum increase in height.

The bhogamandapa (Hall of offering) measures 42 ft (13 m) × 42 ft (13 m) from the inside, 56.25 ft (17.15 m) × 56.25 ft (17.15 m) from the outside and has four doors in each of the sides. The exterior walls of the hall has decorative sculptures of men and beast. The hall has a pyramidal roof made of up several horizontal layers arranged in sets of two with intervening platform. It bears an inverted bell and a kalasa in the top. The natamandira (festival hall) measures 38 ft (12 m) × 38 ft (12 m) from the inside, 50 ft (15 m) × 50 ft (15 m) from the outside, has one main entrance and two side entrances. The side walls of the hall has decorative sculptures displaying women and couples. It has a flat roof sloping in stages. There are thick pylons inside the hall.

The jagamohana (assembly hall) measures 35 ft (11 m) × 30 ft (9.1 m) from the inside, 55 ft (17 m) × 50 ft (15 m) from the outside, entrances from south and north and has a 30 metres (98 ft) tall roof. The hall has a pyramidal roof made of up several horizontal layers arranged in sets of two with intervening platform as in the Hall of offering. The facade to the entrances are decorated with perforated windows with lion sitting on hind legs. The inverted bell above second unit is adorned by kalasa and lions. The rekha deula has a 60 m (200 ft) tall pyramidal tower over the sanctum and measures 22 ft (6.7 m) × 22 ft (6.7 m) from the inside, 52 ft (16 m) × 52 ft (16 m) from the outside over the sanctum. It is covered with decorative design and seated lion projecting from the walls. The sanctum is square in shape from the inside. The tower walls are sculpted with female figures in different poses.

The temple has a vast courtyard mired with hundreds of small shrines.

== Religious significance ==
Bhubaneswar is called the Ekamra Kshetra as the deity of Lingaraja was originally under a mango tree (Ekamra). Ekamra Purana, a Sanskrit treatise of the 13th century mentions that the presiding deity was not seen as lingam (an aniconic form of Shiva) during the Satya and Treta yugas and only during the Dvapara and Kali yugas, it emerged as a lingam. The lingam in the temple is a natural unshaped stone that rests on a Sakti. Such a lingam is called Krutibasa or Swayambhu and is found in 64 places in different parts of India.

With the advent of the Ganga dynasty in the early 12th century, during the period it is attributed to the raising prominence of Jagannath sect that became predominant during the construction of the temple. The Gangas remodelled the temple and introduced certain Vaishnavite elements like images of Vaishnava Dwarapalas namely Jaya and Prachanda; the flag of the temple was fixed to a Pinaka bow instead of trident usually found In Shiva temples

== Festivals and worship ==
As per Hindu legend, an underground river originating from the Lingaraja temple fills the Bindusagar Tank (meaning ocean drop) and the water is believed to heal physical and spiritual illness. The water from the tank is thus treated sacred and pilgrims take a holy dip during festive occasions. The central deity of the temple, Lingaraja, is worshipped as Shiva. The daily rituals takes place as Dwara pita, Mangala arti, Abakash, Sahanmela, Rosa homa, Mahasnan, Besha, Suryapuja, Dwarapala puja, Gopala ballav, Sakaldhupa, Bhogamandap, Besha, Birakesari Bhoga, Dipahara dhupa, Pahuda, Teraphita, Besha, Sandhyadhupa, Badashringar, Badashringar bhoga, Sayana then Pahuda. Major attires of Lord are Jogi Besha, Chandrasekhar Besha, Damodar Besha, Ghodalagi Besha and Suna Besha. After each dhupa or meal offering the thali is again offered to Maa Parvati like households. Rosa homa is done with the guidance of Parvati; so She is known as Annapurneswari.

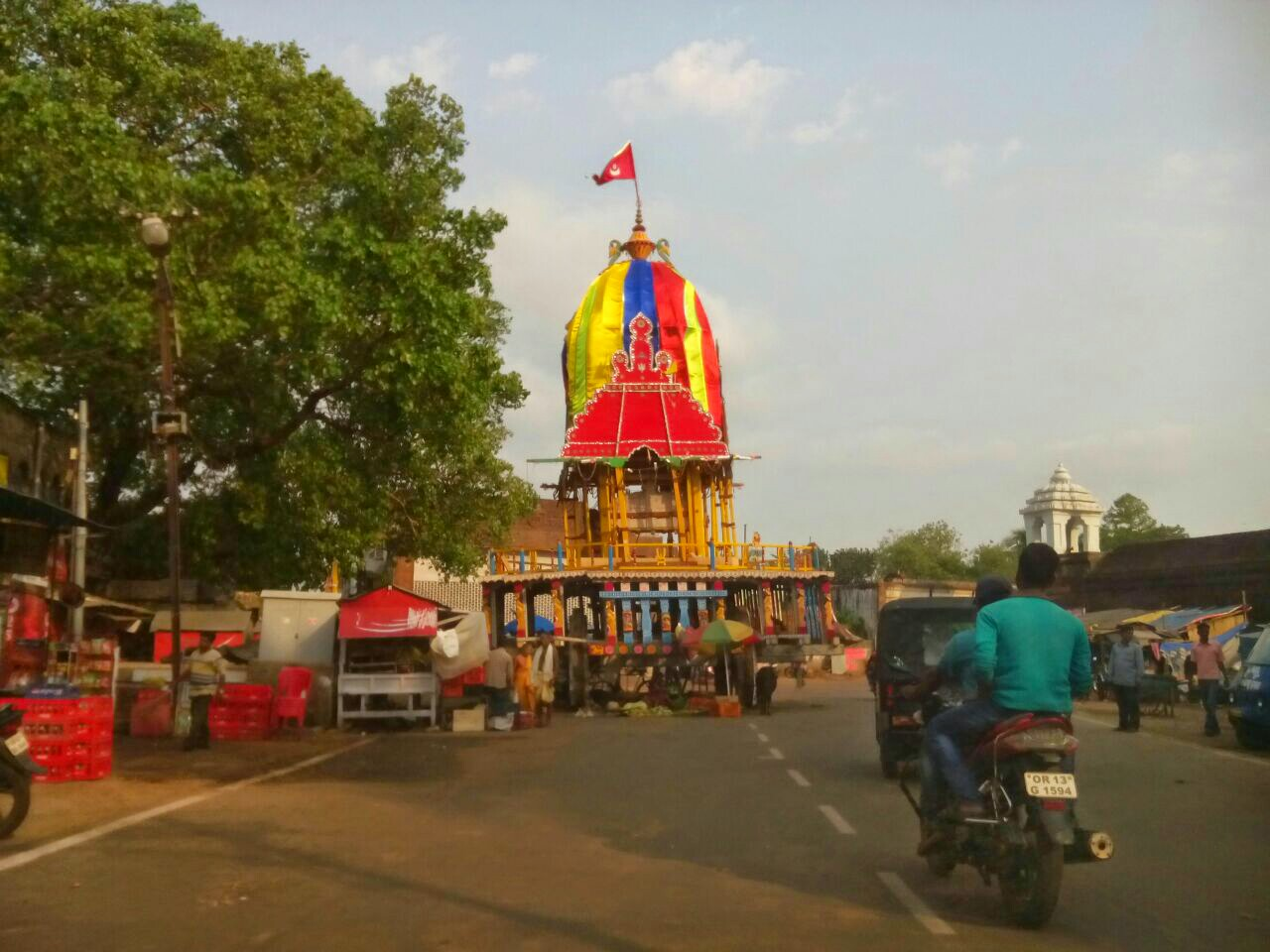
Rukuna Ratha yatra is an annual Ratha yatra of Lingaraja

Shivaratri is the main festival celebrated annually in Phalgun month when thousands of devotees visit the temple. Apart from a full day of fasting, bel leaves are offered to Lingaraja on this auspicious day. The main celebrations take place at night when devotees pray all night long. The devout usually break their fast after the Mahadipa (a huge lamp) is lit on the spire of the temple. This festival commemorates Lingaraja having slain a demon. Thousands of bol bom pilgrims carry water from river Mahanadi and walk all the way to the temple during the month of Shravana every year. Sunian day is observed from royal times in the month of Bhandra, a day when temple servants, peasants and other holders of temple lands offer loyalty and tribute to Lingaraja. Chandan Yatra (Sandalwood ceremony) is a 22-day festival celebrated in the temple when servants of the temple disport themselves in a specially made barge in Bindusagar tank. The deities and servants of the temples are anointed with sandalwood paste to protect from heat. Dances, communal feasts, and merrymaking are arranged by the people associated with the temple.

Every year the chariot festival (Ratha-Yatra) of Lingaraja is celebrated on Ashokashtami. The deity is taken in a chariot to Rameshwar Deula temple. Thousands of devotees follow and pull brightly decorated chariots containing the idols of Lingaraj, Durga And Dolagovind. Maa Parvati visits Rameswar deula on Dasami but Lord Lingaraj refused her to stay there therefore Maa Parvati gets angry. After returning to temple promises Maa Parvati to take her during boat festival for 21 days. During GuruPanchami night Baba Lingaraj marries Maa Parvati in Kedar Gouri temple.Then in Sitalsasthi night returns to the temple with a grand procession. The Lingaraja temple is active in worship practises, unlike the other ancient temples of Bhubaneshwar which are not active worship centres. Non Hindus are not allowed inside the temple, but it can be viewed from the viewing platform located outside the temple. The viewing platform and the back of the temple can be reached via a laneway located to the right of the main entrance of the temple. Sanctity of the temple is maintained by disallowing dogs, unbathed visitors, menstruating women and families that encountered birth or death in the preceding 12 days. In case of a foreign trespass, the temple follows a purification ritual and dumping of prasad (food offering) in a well.

== Staff and administration ==
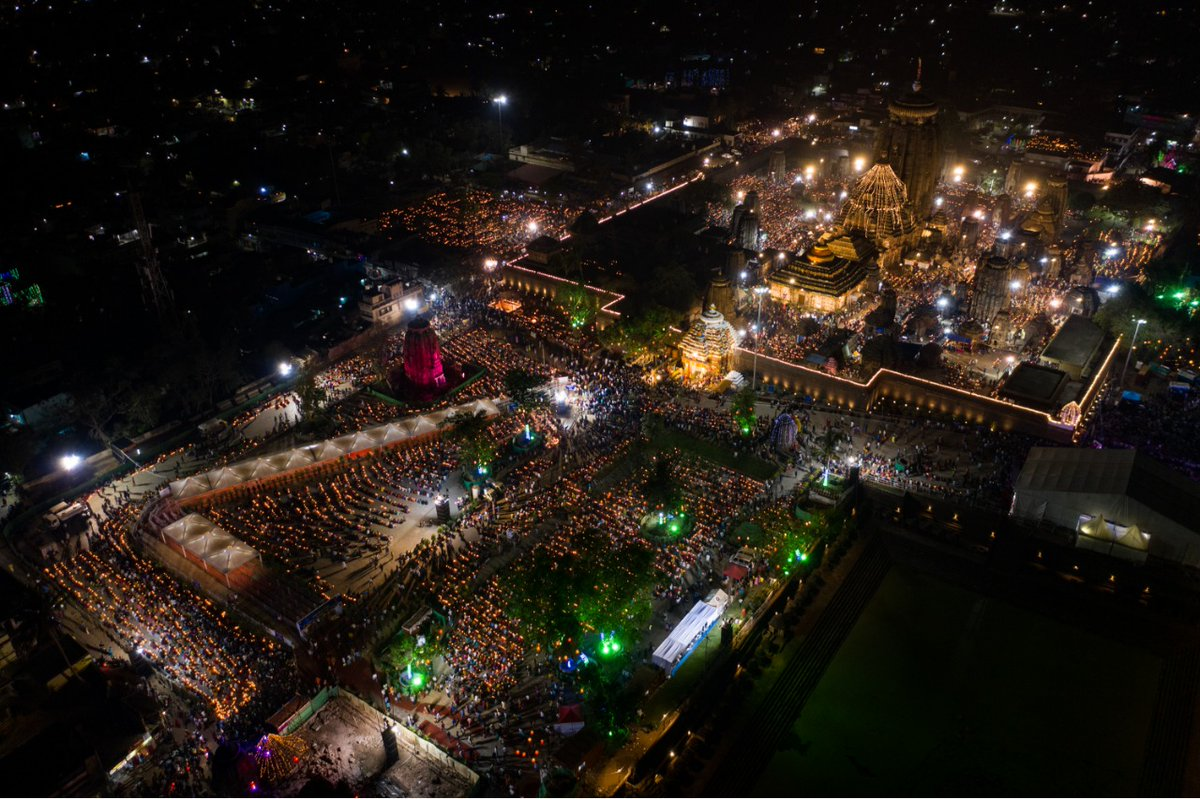
Birds eye view during Deepa Dana, February 2020

King Jajati Keshari, believed to be the founder of the Lingaraja temple, deputed Brahmanas who had migrated to south India as temple priests over the local Brahmins on account of their increased knowledge of Shaivism, due to increasing invasions from Muslim invaders. Bose (1958) identified 41 services with the involvement of 22 separate castes and Mahaptra (1978) identified 30 services. It is understood from the records that kings and temple managers of different times introduced or discontinued certain services, fairs, offerings, and caste-centred core services during their regime. As of 2012, the temple practised 36 different services (nijogas).

In modern times, the Lingaraja temple priests are from three communities, namely Pujapanda Nijog, Brahman Nijog and Badu Nijog. The Badu are non-Brahmin servant groups, whose origin is not ascertained due to unavailability of authentic records, while they are described as Vadu in chapter 62 of the Ekamrapurana. The caste group of Badu is called Niyoga, which elects the officers every year during the Sandalwood festival. Every Badu undergoes three distinct rites, namely, ear-piercing, marriage, and god-touching. Historically, the Badus performed five different temple duties - Paliabadu and Pharaka, which were considered important and Pochha, Pahada and Khataseja, which were considered inferior. From 1962, only Paliabadu and Pharaka practises are followed and the others are discontinued. The Badus also carry out ablution and dressing of the images of Siddhaganesh and Gopalini.

The temple is maintained by the Temple Trust Board and the Archaeological Survey of India (ASI). The temple is guarded by security personnel deputed by the Police Commissioner of Bhubaneswar and security guards appointed by the temple administration. The temple has an average of 6,000 visitors every day and receives lakhs of visitors during festivals. The Shivaratri festival during 2012 witnessed 200,000 visitors. As of 2011, the annual income of Lingaraja temple from hundis (donation boxes) is around ₹1.2 million per annum. Another ₹4 million is collected annually from other sources like rents from shops, cycle stands and agriculture lands. Starting 2011, the temple charges an amount for six types of religious worship (special pujas) carried out by the devotees.

== Gallery ==
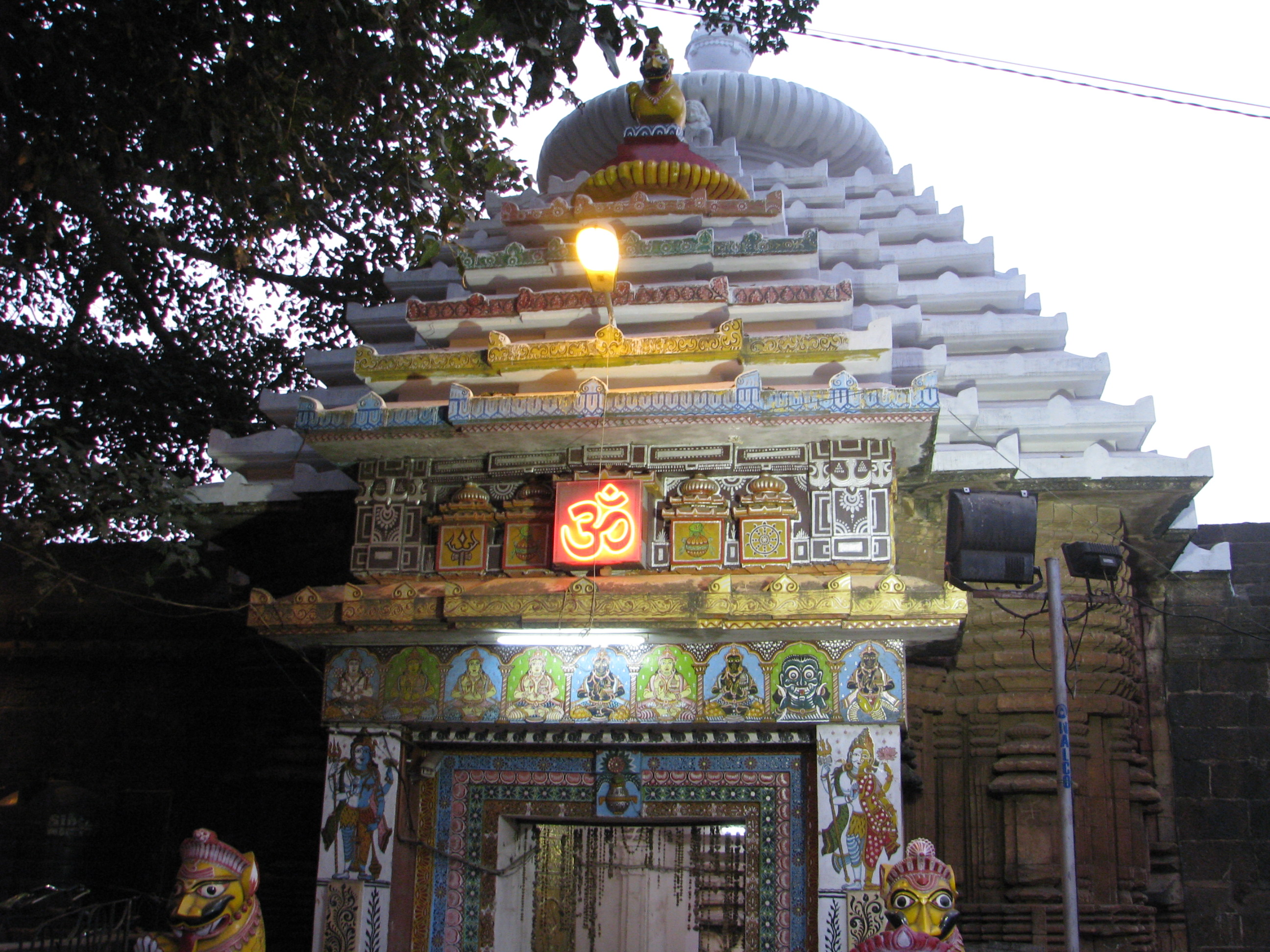
The main entrance to the Lingaraj Temple

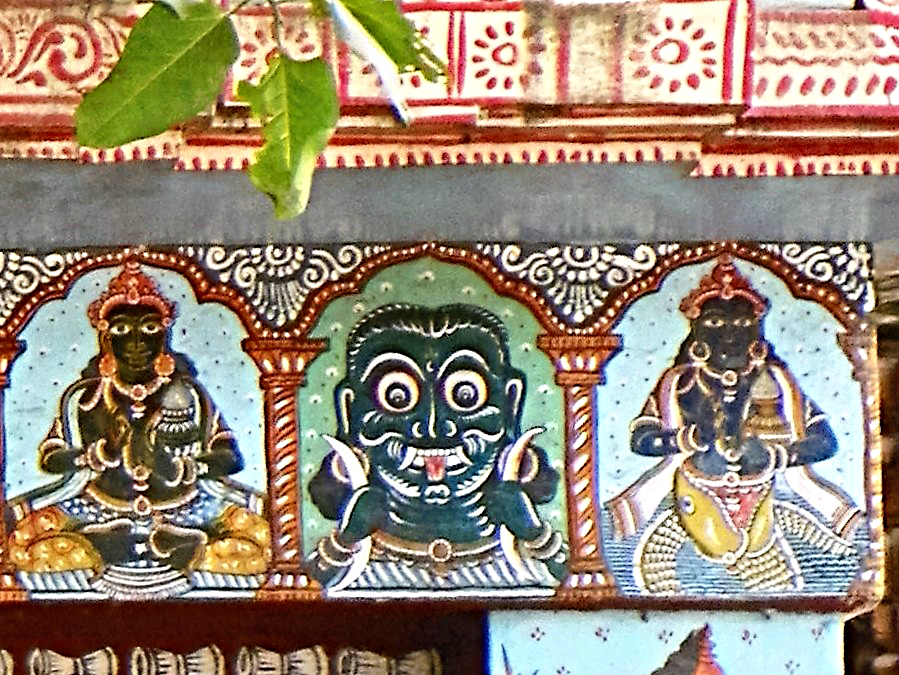
Detail of the entrance decoration

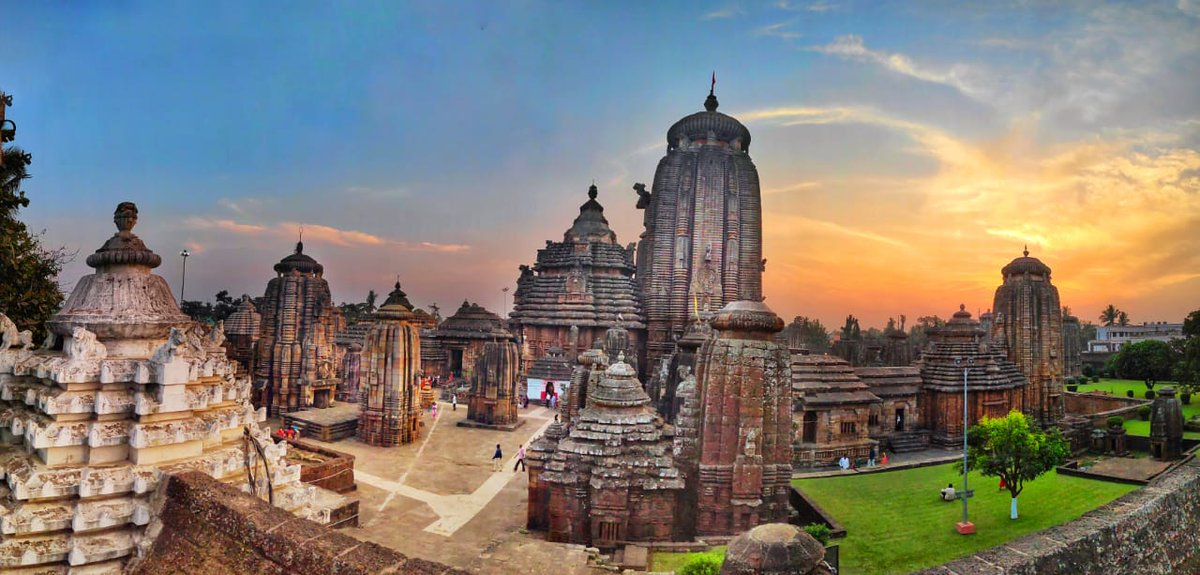
Lingaraj Temple complex at dusk during Shivratri 2020.

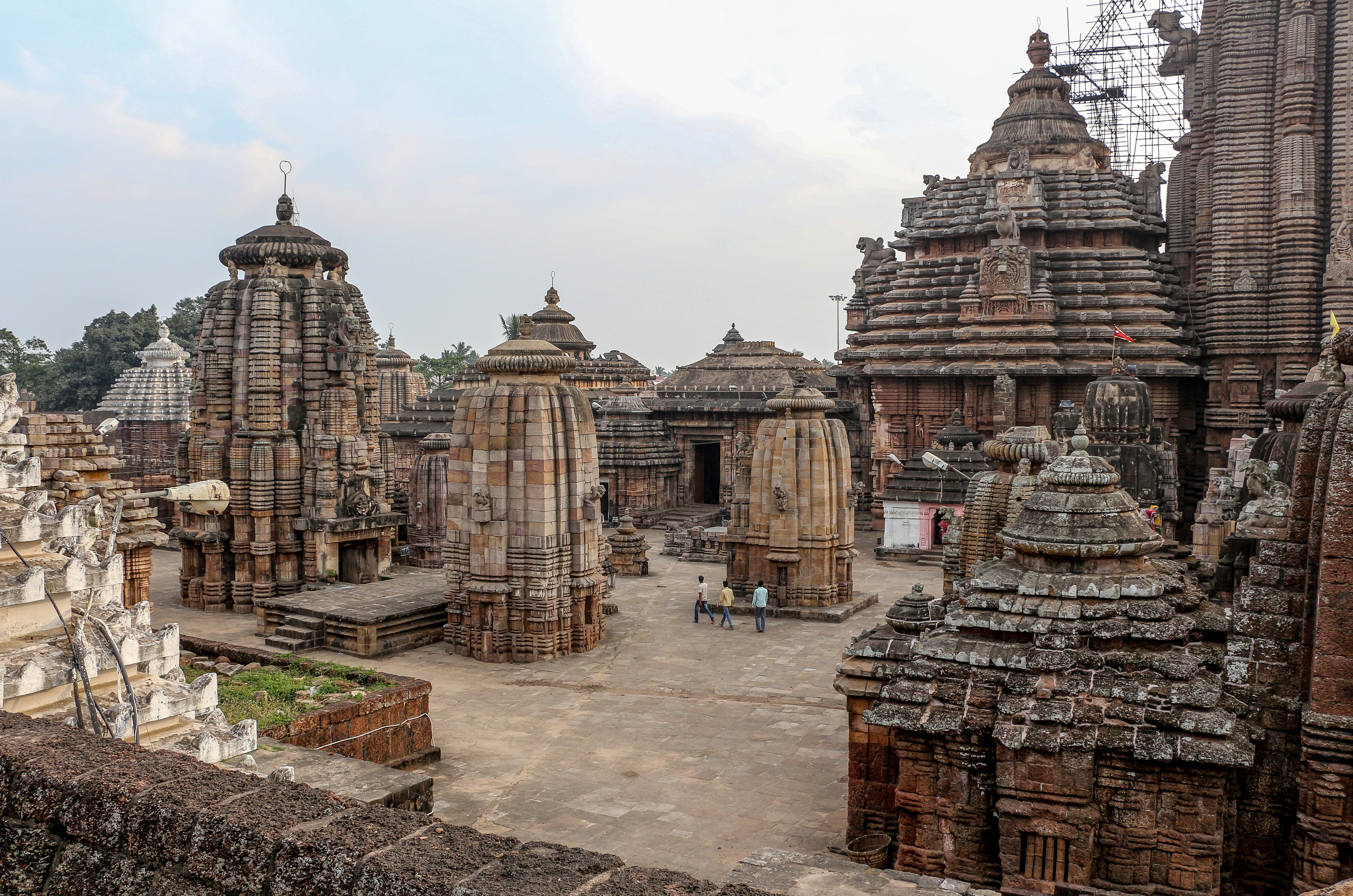
Minor temples in the Lingaraja Temple complex.

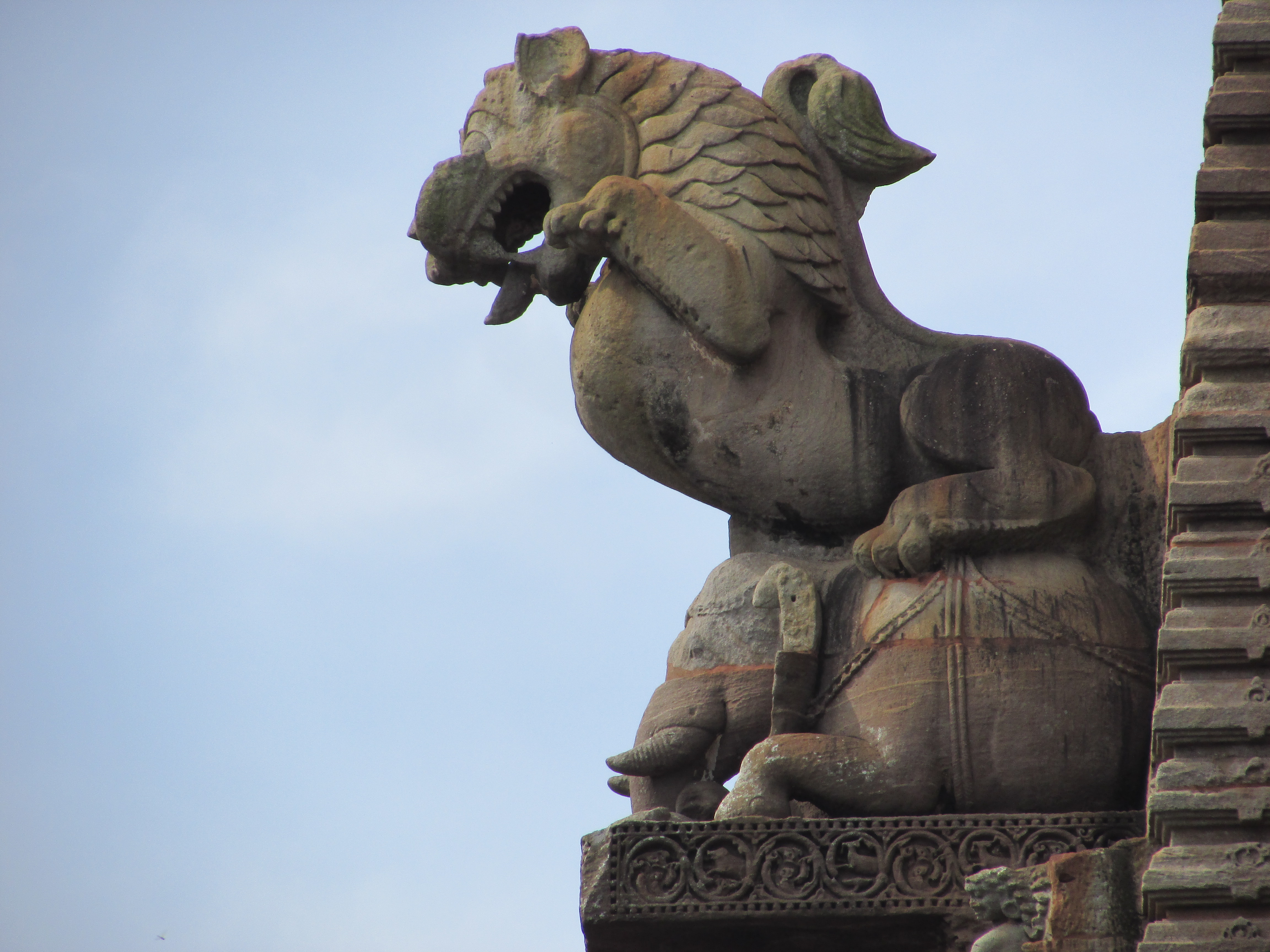
A sculpted griffin or "udagajasingha" on the main temple spire.

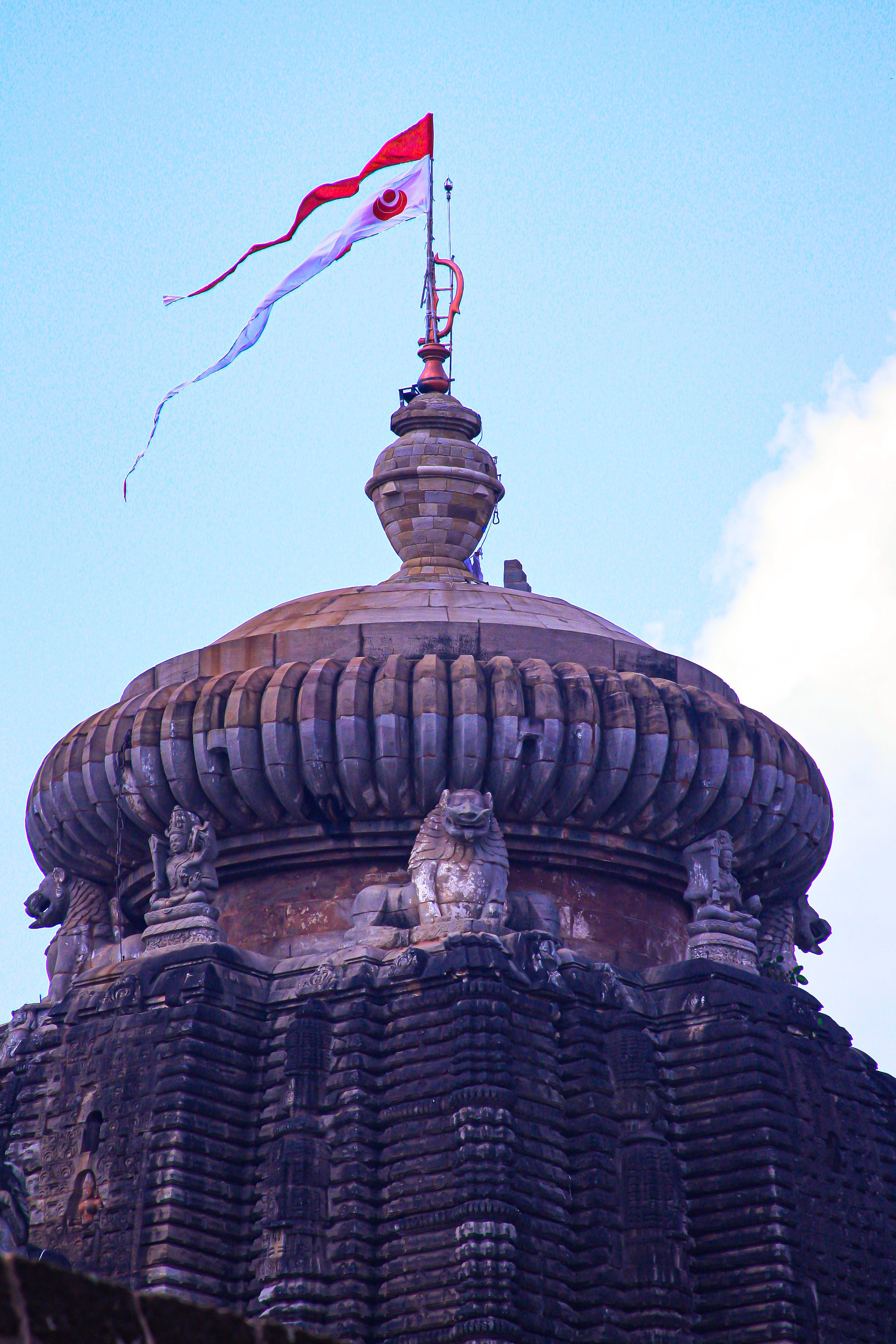
The spire of the temple.

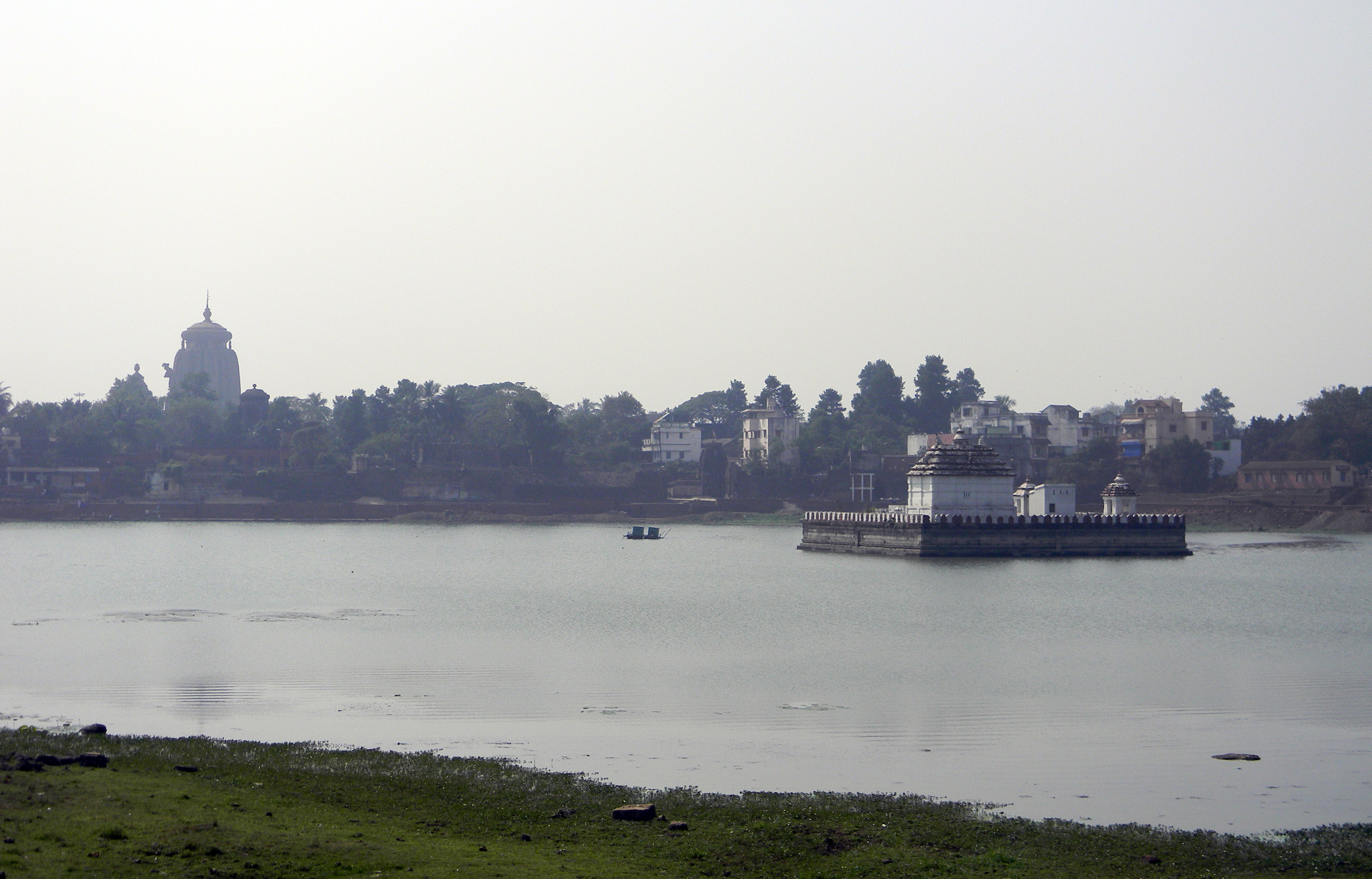
Image of Bindusagar pond with Lingaraja temple in the background.

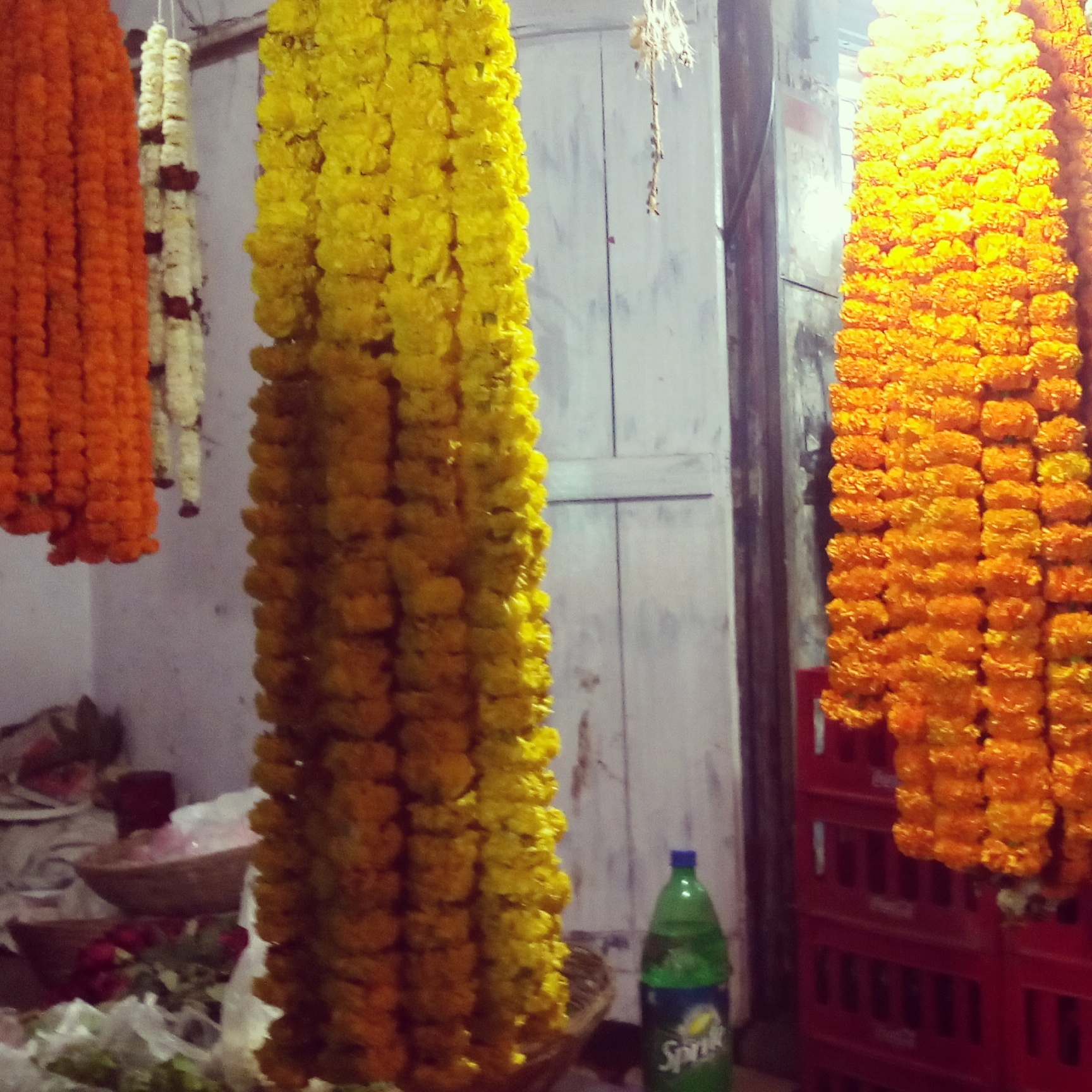
Varieties of Marigold for offering to Lingaraja during Shivaratri at Bhubaneswar.

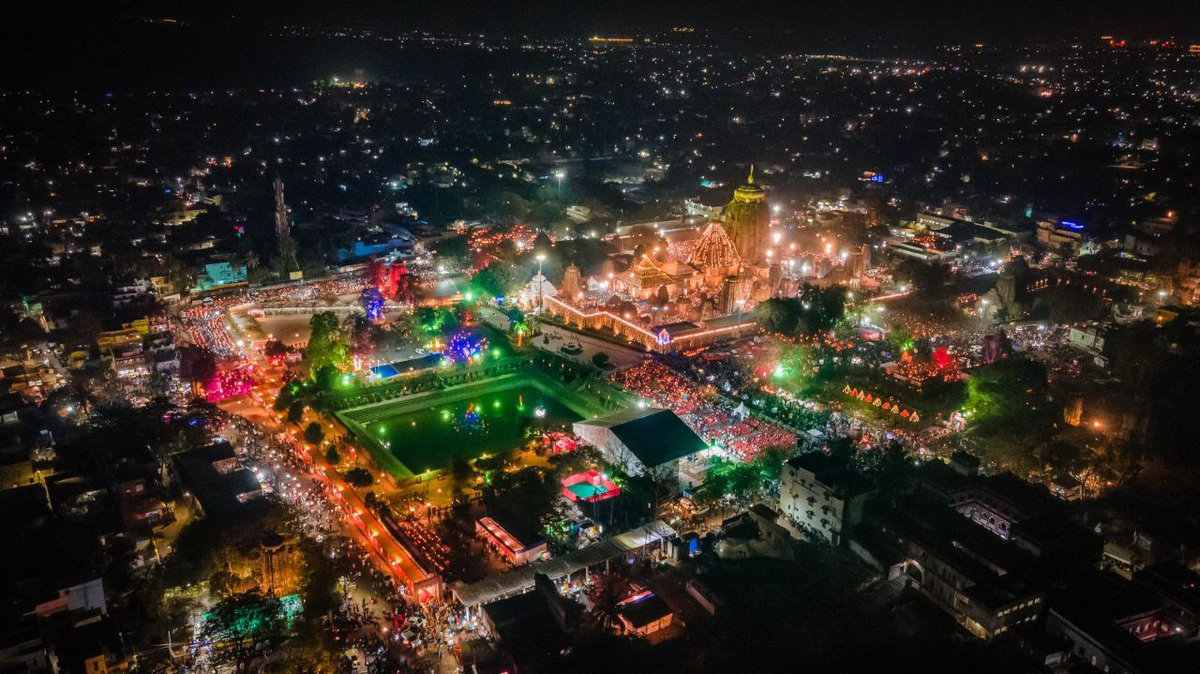
Birds eye view of Bindu Sagar and Lingaraj Temple in MahaShibaratri, 2023

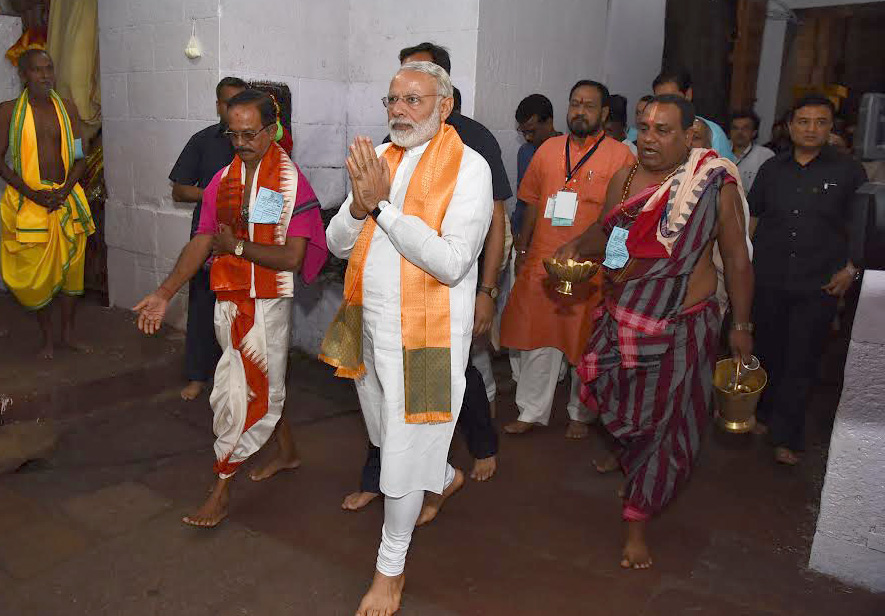
Narendra Modi offering prayers at Lingaraja Temple on April 16, 2017.
