= Gosagaresvar Siva Temple =

- '
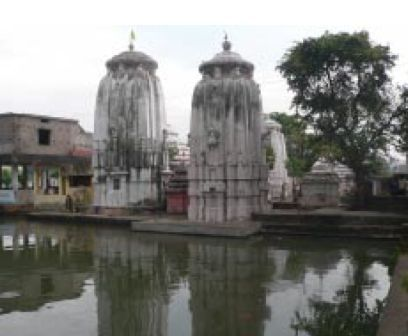
- Gosagaresvara Temple

- Location in Odisha Gosagaresvar Siva Temple (India)

Religion
- Affiliation: Hinduism
- Deity: Gosagaresvar Siva (Siva)

Location
- Location: Bhubaneswar
- State: Odisha
- Country: India
- Interactive map of Gosagaresvar Siva Temple
- Coordinates: 20°14′N 85°49′E 20.24538°N, 85.832681°E

Architecture
- Type: Kalinga architecture
- Completed: 14th century A.D.

Gosagaresvar Siva Temple is a Hindu temple dedicated to god Shiva located in the city of Bhubaneswar in Orissa, India. There are three Hindu shrines dedicated to Shiva within the walls of the temple complex.

== History ==
The temple was built during Ganga rule 14th-15th centuries A.D The temple has a single pidha vimana of Kalinagan order. It is a living temple and the presiding deity is a Sivalinga within a circular Yonipitha. The temple was repaired by Orissa State Archaeology under X and XI Finance Commission Award. Religious ceremonies like Sivaratri and Sankranti are observed here.

== Architecture ==
- Structural System : Pidha vimana of impoverished Kalingan order
- Building Techniques : Ashlar Dry masonry.
- Material of Construction : Coarse grained sandstone

== See also ==
- List of temples in Bhubaneswar
