= Bhubaneswar Development Authority =

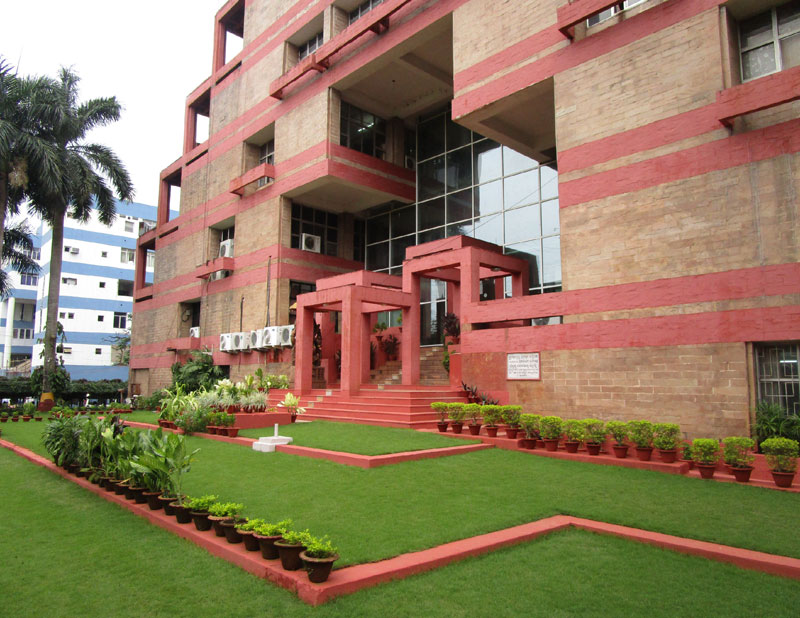

Agency overview
- Formed: 1 September 1983
- Jurisdiction: Government of Odisha
- Headquarters: Akash Shova Bhawan, Sachivalaya Marg, Kharvela Nagar, Bhubaneswar, OD-751001
- Minister responsible: Dr Krushna Chandra Mahapatra, Cabinet Minister, Housing and Urban Development Department
- Agency executives: Dr. Krushna Chandra Mahapatra, Chairman; Sri. Chanchal Rana (IAS), Vice Chairman
- Website: www.bda.gov.in

Bhubaneswar Development Authority (BDA) is a statutory agency which is responsible for development and beautification of Bhubaneswar, the capital city of Odisha. It was established on 1 September 1983. BDA is responsible for creating development plans, regulating development and use of land, undertaking works pertaining to construction of housing colonies, commercial complexes and providing public amenities like water supply, drainage, sewerage, and transportation, social facilities etc. Apart from the main city, Bhubaneswar, BDA covers 556 revenue villages covering an area of about 1110 km^{2}.

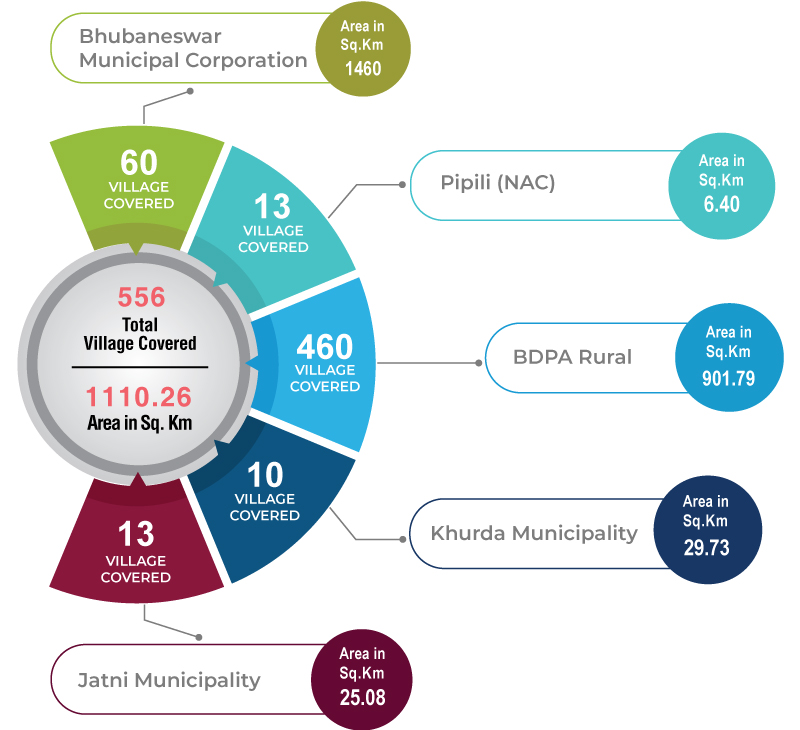

== Jurisdiction Map ==
BDA Jurisdiction Map
