= Ekamra Kshetra =

Tourist site in Odisha

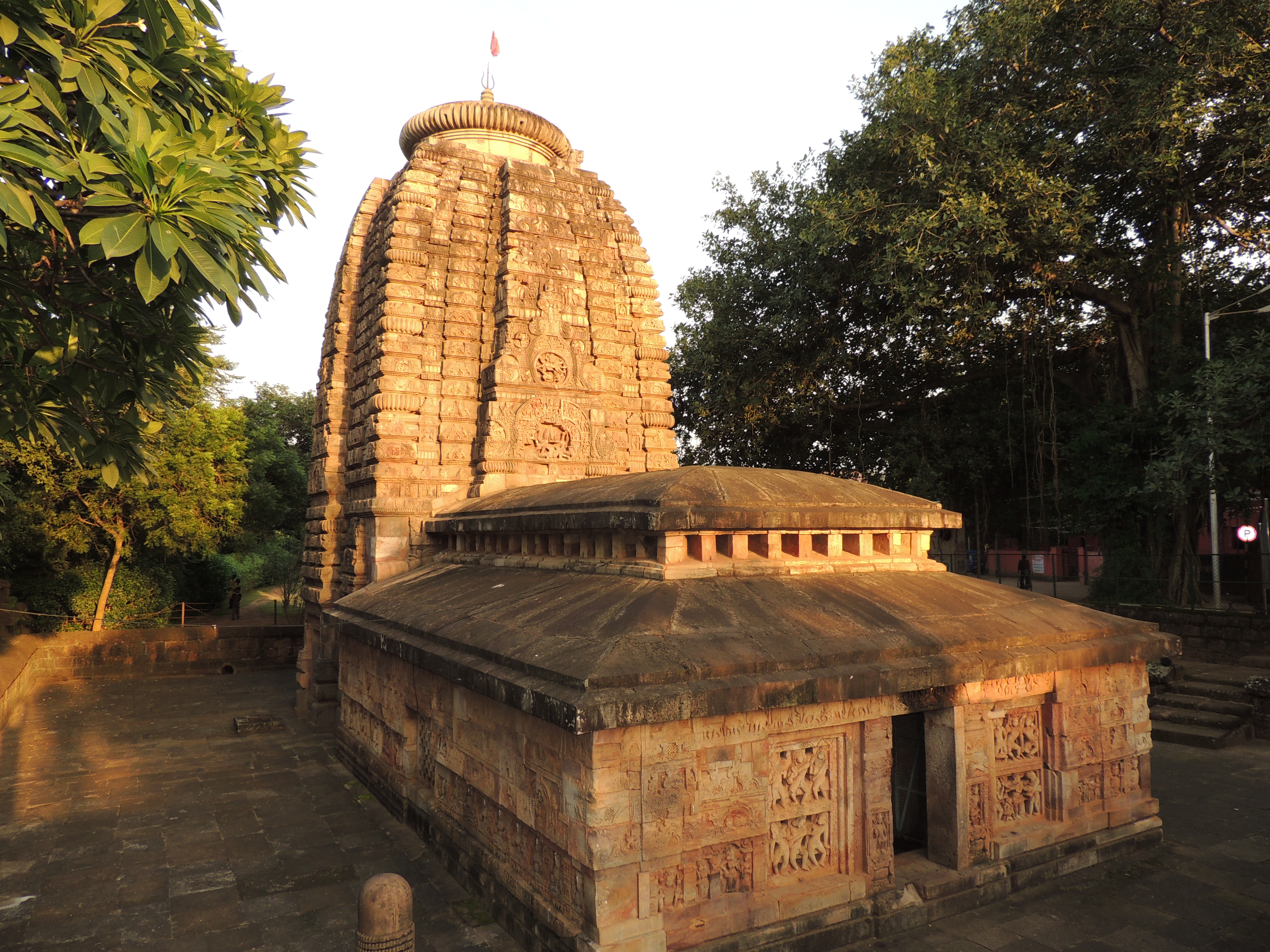
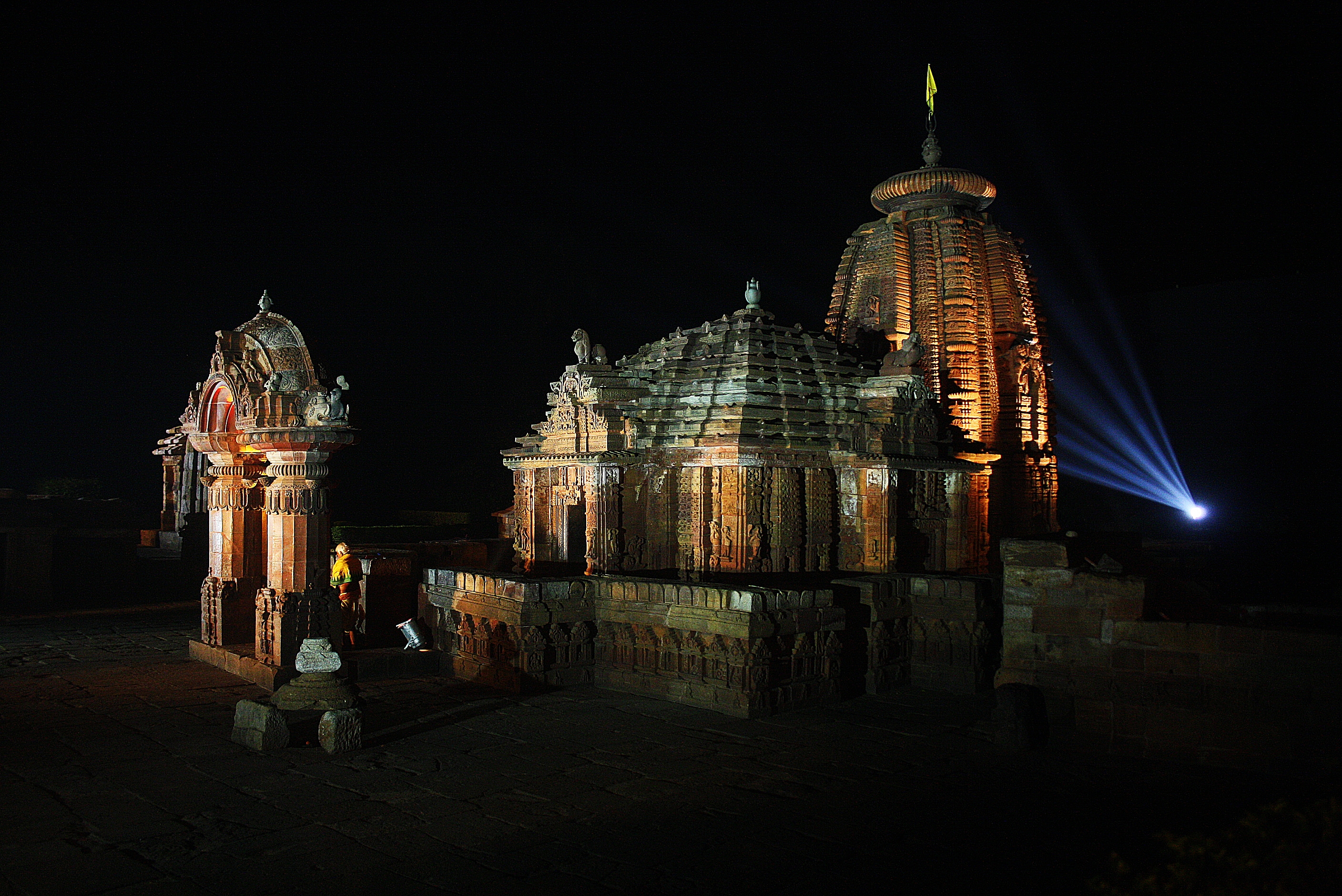
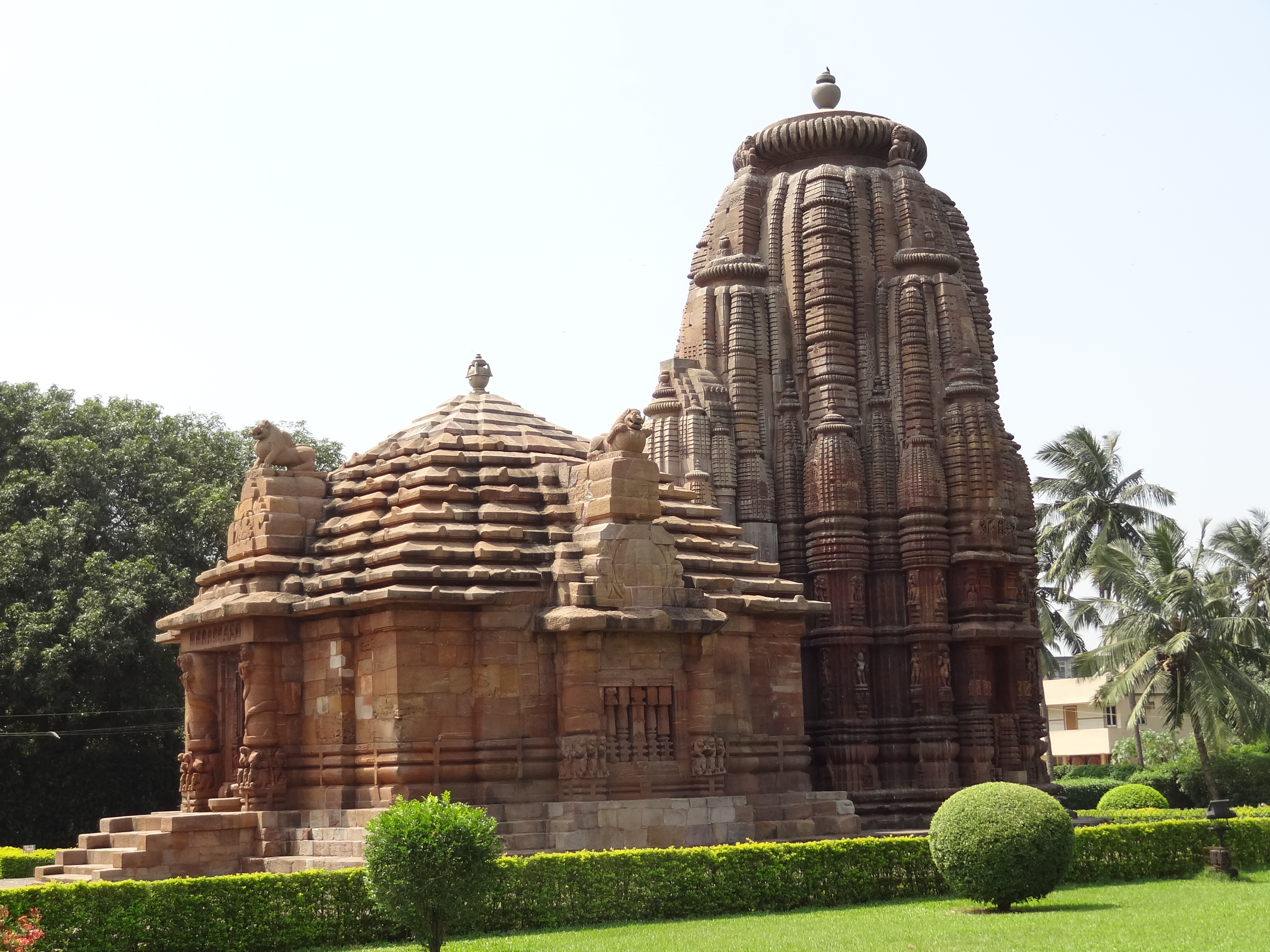
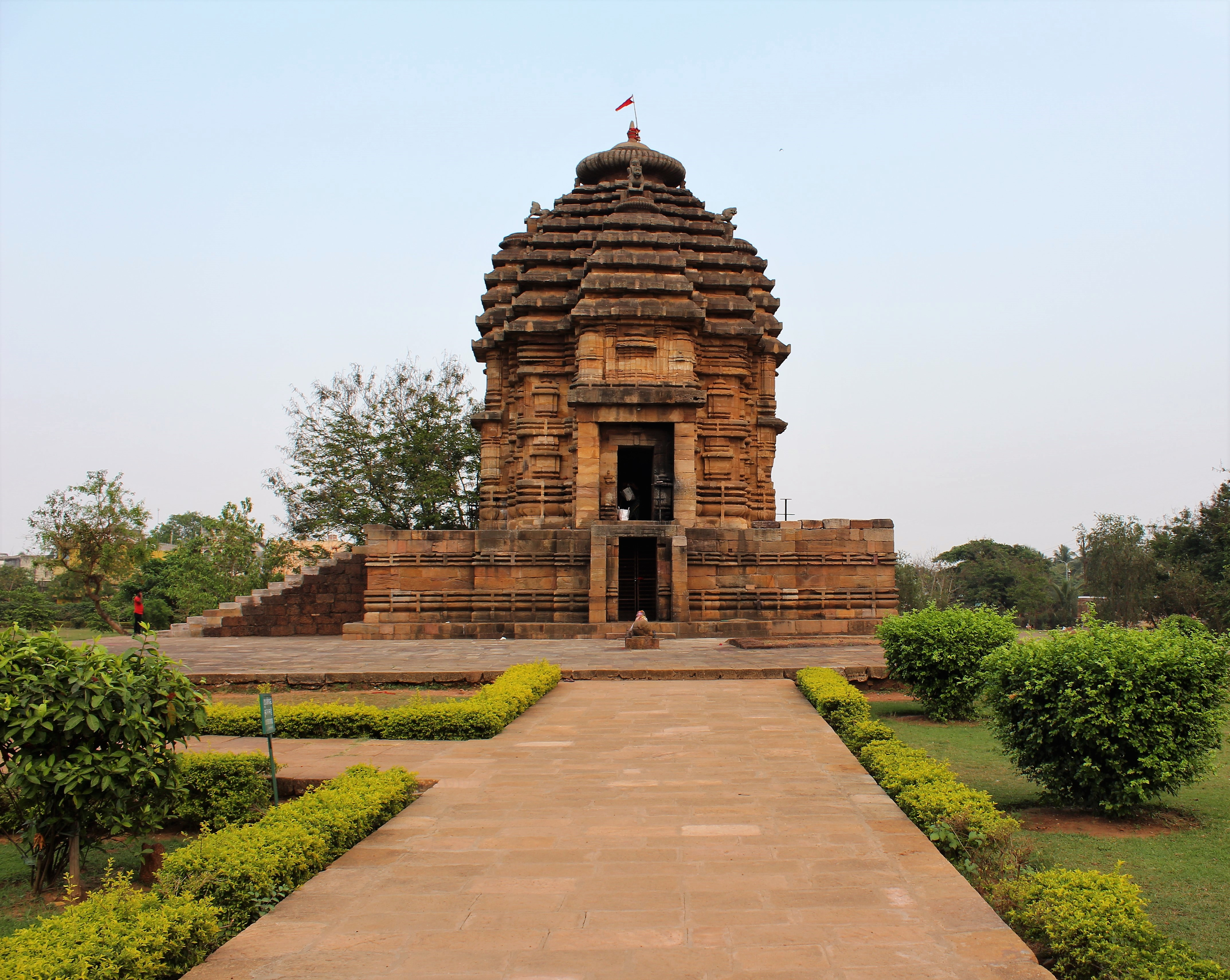
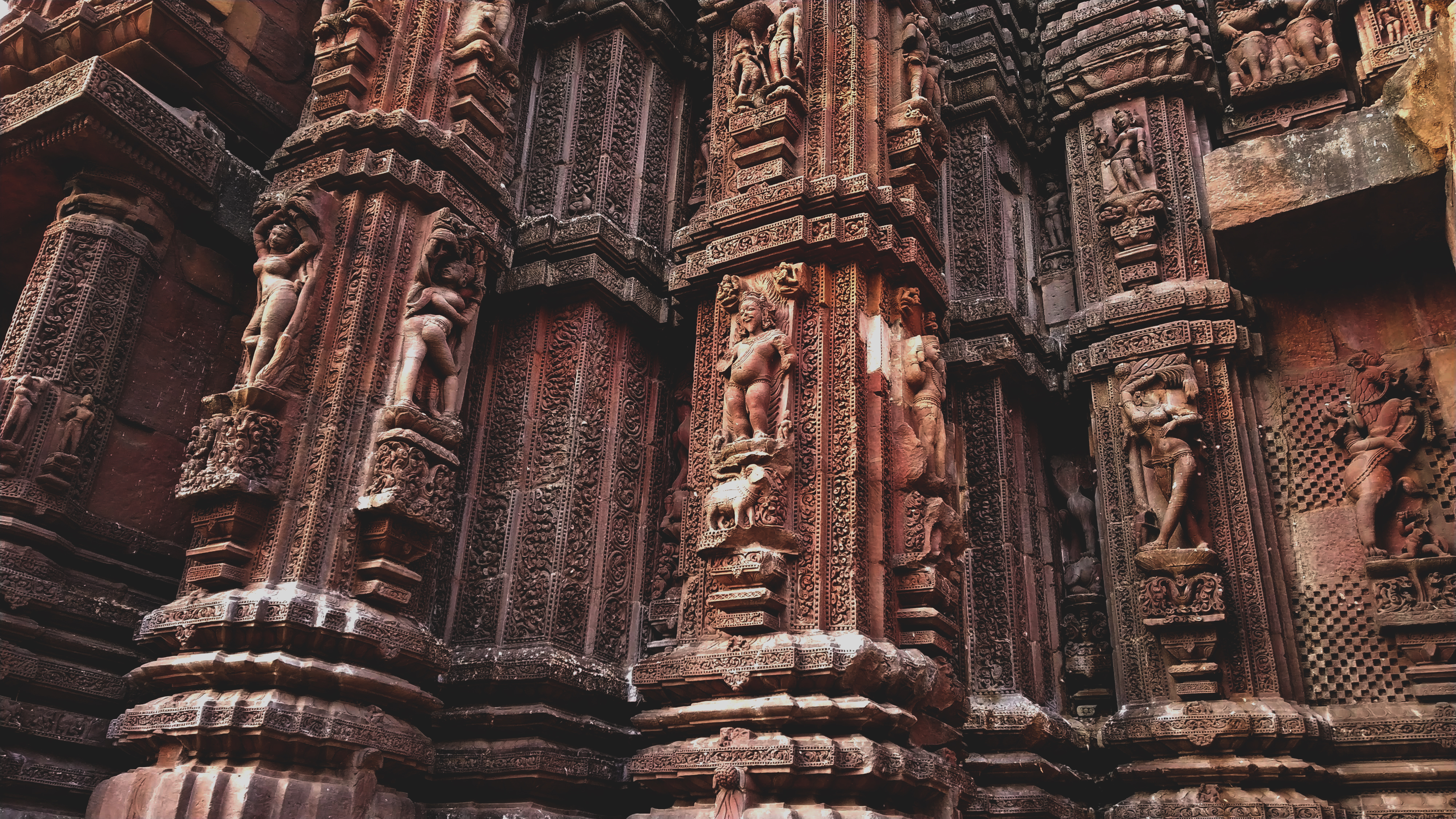
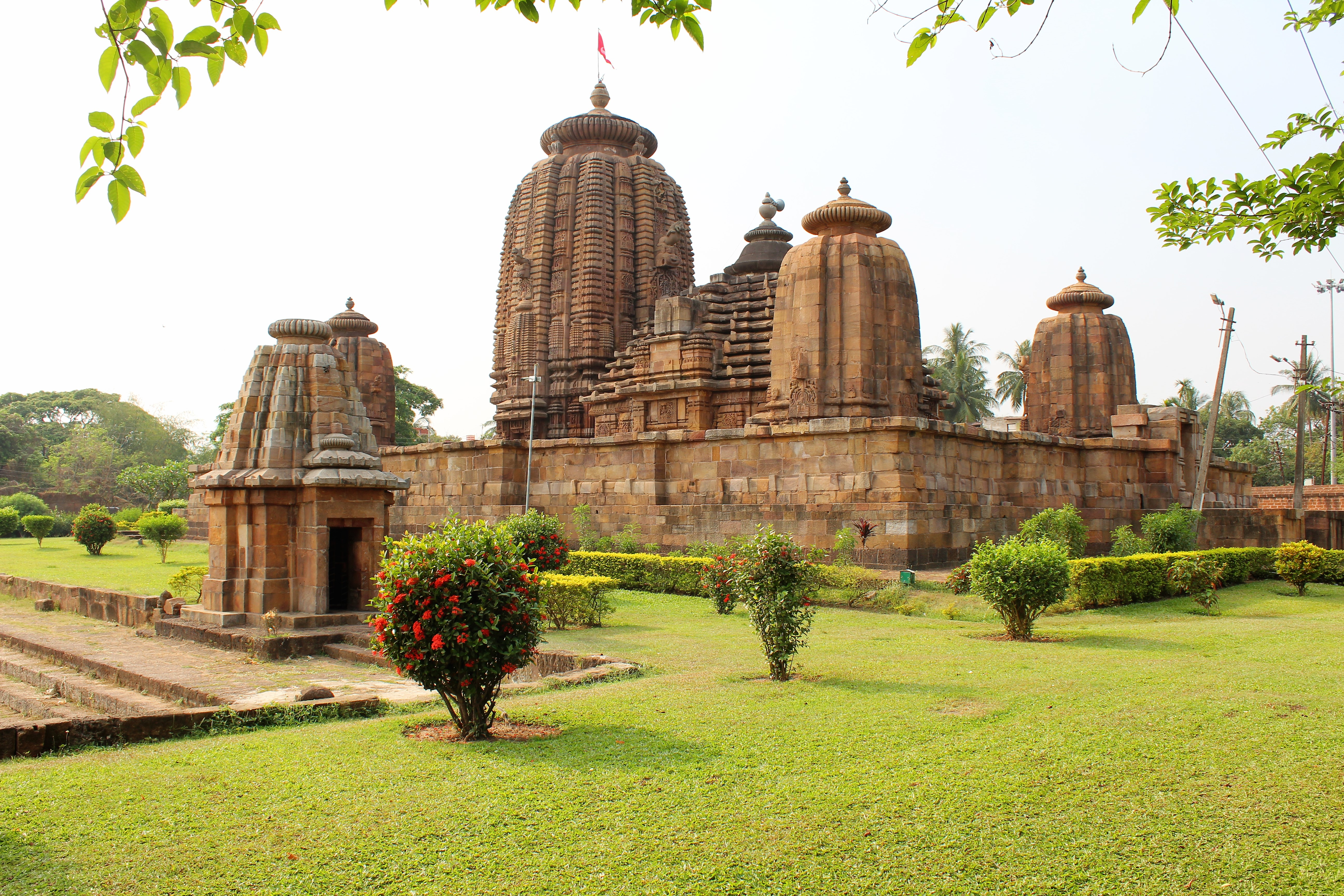
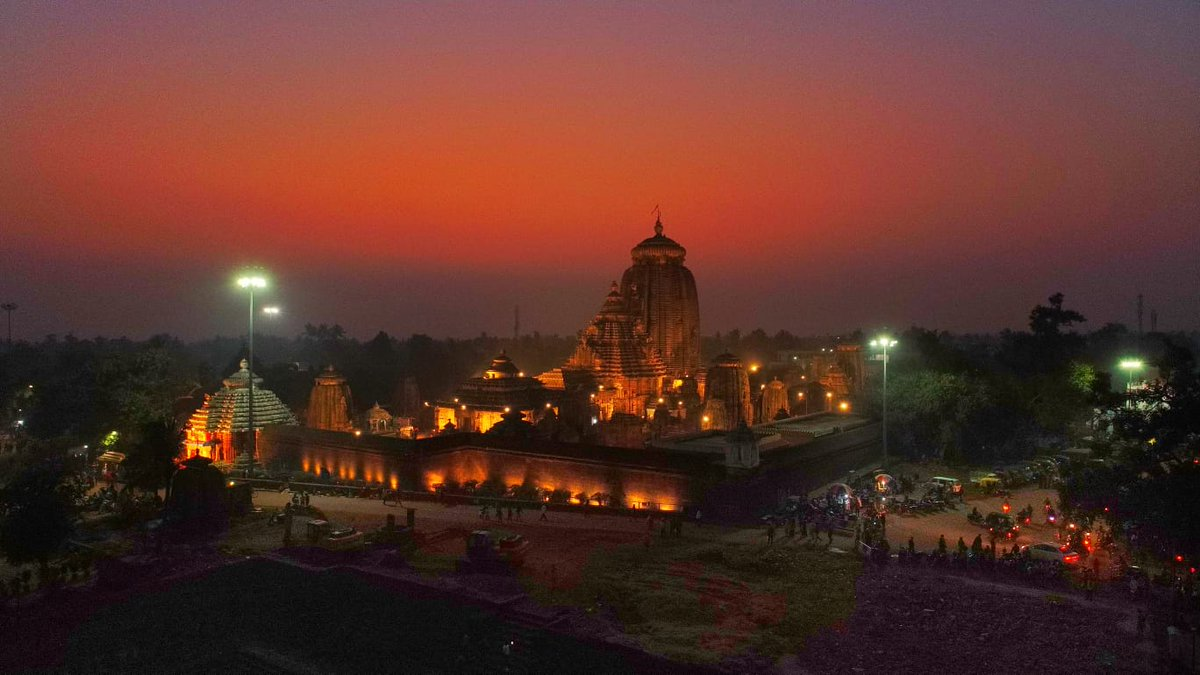

Religion
- Affiliation: Hinduism
- District: Khordha district

Location
- Location: Old Town, Bhubaneswar
- State: Odisha
- Country: India
- Interactive map of Ekamra Kshetra
- Coordinates: 20°14′18″N 85°50′01″E

Architecture
- Type: Kalinga Architecture

Ekamra Kshetra or the temple city of Bhubaneswar is a series of ancient sandstone temples, heritage ponds and water tanks, its wealth of monuments is testament to an ancient continuous architectural and historical heritage covering over 2,000 years from the 3rd century BC to the 15th century AD. It has been listed as a tentative site in UNESCO World Heritage list.

== Modernisation plan ==
In the year 2020 Government of Odisha decided to make the area modern, which will attract more tourists. The Ekamra Kshetra development project covers an area of 1126 acre with an outer core of 476 acre, intermediate core of 504 acre and inner core of 145 acre.

The first phase of the project includes outer access road development, Lingaraj entry plaza, Bindusagar revival plan, parking space, heritage complex, development of amenities for Kedar Gouri- Mukteswar complex, e-auto project, relocation project and a state-of-the-art interpretation centre. As Bindusagar is a major attraction, work has started on its holistic development and beautification. All construction between Lingaraj Temple and Bindusagar will be dismantled so that pilgrims can also visit the Bindhyabasini, Bhabanishankar, Sukashari and Mohini temples without any problem. Till around 350 years back, there was no construction between Lingaraj Temple and Bindusagar except temples. The same thing will be restored in the Ekamra Kshetra project.
