= Somabaresvara Siva Temple =

- Location in Orissa

Religion
- Affiliation: Hinduism
- Deity: Siva lingam

Location
- Location: Bhubaneswar
- State: Orissa
- Country: India
- Interactive map of Somabaresvara Siva Temple
- Coordinates: 20°15′53″N 85°51′40″E

Architecture
- Type: kalingan Kalinga Architecture
- Elevation: 17 m (56 ft)

The Somabaresvara Siva Temple is located in the Kapilesvara temple precinct (Lat- 200 15’ 53" N., Long- 850 51’ 40" E., Elev- 56 ft). The enshrined deity is a Sivalingam over a square yonipitha made of sandstone. The temple has a vimana in pidha order. It is triratha on plan and the temple is buried up to the baranda. The temple is facing towards west. The remaining part of the bada measure 0.78 m in height. The gandi measures 0.75 m having three receding tiers. Mastaka measures 0.50 m in height. The doorjamb measures 0.57 m in height x 0.38 m in width and the sanctum is 0.27 m below the ground level. The cella measures 0.75 square m whereas the vimana measures 1.15 square m. The temple is surrounded by Beharana mandapa in the west at a distance of 7.50 m, Kapila kunda in the east. Southern entrance of the Natamandapa of Kapilesvara temple in the north, Kala Bhairava temple is at a distance of 1.55 m.

== See also ==
- List of Hindu temples in India#Orissa
