= Ghanteswara Siva Temple =

- Location in Orissa

Religion
- Affiliation: Hinduism
- Deity: Siva lingam

Location
- Location: Bhubaneswar
- State: Orissa
- Country: India
- Interactive map of Ghanteswara Siva Temple
- Coordinates: 20°15′53″N 85°51′40″E

Architecture
- Type: kalingan Kalinga Architecture
- Elevation: 17 m (56 ft)

Ghanteswara Siva Temple is located in the Kapileswara precinct. The enshrined deity is a Siva-lingam over a square yonipitha made of laterite. The temple has a vimana in pidha order. It is triratha on plan. The temple is facing towards west. The total height of the temple is 2.83 m. (bada 1.13 m, gandi 1.00 m and mastaka 0.70 m). The gandi has three tiers. The doorjambs measure 0.82 m in height x 0.41 m in width. The cella measure 0.90 square m, whereas the temple measure 1.53 square m. There is an inscription in the lalatabimba. The temple is surrounded by Bhoga-mandapa of Kapileswara temple in north. At a distance of 15.50 m, Rosasala pathway in east, Dutiya Kapileswara temple in the west at a distance of 8.40 m and Gupteswar temple in south at a distance on 6.45 m.

== See also ==
- List of Hindu temples in India § Orissa
