= Chakresvara Tank =

- Location in Odisha Chakresvara Tank (India)

Religion
- Affiliation: Hinduism
- Deity: Lord Shiva

Location
- Location: Bhubaneswar
- State: Odisha
- Country: India
- Interactive map of Chakresvara Tank
- Coordinates: 20°14′57″N 85°50′51″E

Architecture
- Type: Kalingan Style (Kalinga Architecture)
- Completed: Early part of 20th century A.D.
- Elevation: 20 m (66 ft)

Chakresvara Tank is behind the Chakresvara temple which is in the Hatiasuni lane, Rajarani colony, Bhubaneswar, Odisha, India. One can approach the site at the end of the Hatiasuni lane branching from tankapani road. It is situated to the south west of Rajarani temple. The tank is surrounded by Chakresvara temple in east, residential building in north, and pasture land on other two sides.

== History ==
The tank was supposed to be built around early part of 20th century A.D. The tank is under the private possession of Sri. Arakhita Behera who is residing in the same Hatiasuni lane in front of the Chakresvara temple.

== Architectural feature ==
The tank is square on plan with laterite embankments. The tank is fed by a natural spring which keeps the water level constant throughout the year. There is an outlet channel in the south west corner to discharge the excess and waste water.
