= Manibhadresvara Siva Temple – I =

Manibhadresvara Siva Temple – I.
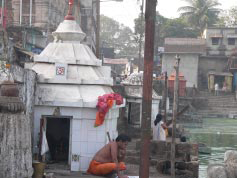

- Location in Orissa

Religion
- Affiliation: Hinduism
- Deity: lord Shiva

Location
- Location: Bhubaneswar
- State: Orissa
- Country: India
- Interactive map of Manibhadresvara Siva Temple – I.
- Coordinates: 20°14′27″N 85°50′12″E

Architecture
- Type: Kalingan Style (Kalinga Architecture)
- Completed: 14th century A.D.
- Elevation: 17 m (56 ft)

Manibhadresvara Siva temple is located in Bhubaneswar, Orissa, India.

It was built around 14th century A.D. and is located at Latitude of 20 degree 14’ 45" N., Longitude of 85 degree 50’ 14" E., and Elevation of 55 ft and is situated in the eastern embankment of Bindusagar tank. It is on the right side of the road branching from Kedara-Gouri to Lingaraja temple. The enshrined deity is a Siva-lingam within a circular yoni pitha at the centre of sanctum. The temple is facing towards north.

== Significance ==
=== Historic significance ===
Local people ascribe the temple to the Kesaris (Samavamsis), that architecture does not conform to local legend.

=== Cultural significance ===
Rituals like Sankranti are celebrated in the temple.

=== Social significance ===
Sradha, pindadana, mundanakriya are also performed in the temple.

== Physical description ==
=== Surrounding ===
The temple is surrounded by Bindusagar tank in the west and Dalmiya Dharmasala in south-east at a distance of 20.00 m across the road.

=== Architectural features ===
On plan, the temple has a pidha Vimana measuring 1.70 m^{2} and stands on a low pista with a height of 0.38 m. On elevation, the vimana has bada, gandi and mastaka measuring 2.42 m in height from bottom to the top. With threefold division of the bada the temple has a trianga bada measuring 1.26 meters height. The pabhaga, jangha and baranda measures 0.38 m, 0.71 m and 0.17 m in height respectively. The gandi measures 1.00 m and mastaka 0.16 m in height.

=== Building techniques ===
It is built with Laterite by Dry masonry Construction techniques and kalingan style.
