= Mahabhoi Sasana Tank =

- Location in Orissa

Religion
- Affiliation: Hinduism
- Deity: lord Vishnu

Location
- Location: Bhubaneswar
- State: Orissa
- Country: India
- Interactive map of Mahabhoi Sasana Tank
- Coordinates: 20°14′07″N 85°51′35″E

Architecture
- Type: Kalingan Style (Kalinga Architecture)
- Completed: 12th century A.D.
- Elevation: 14 m (46 ft)

Mahabhoi Sasana Tank is situated on the right bank of the stream Gangua. It is mentioned as a tank in the forgotten monuments of Bhubaneswar, Odisha, India. But now it has no existence because of private construction over the tank. Only the old laterite pavements are visible below the structures.
