= Talesavara Siva Temple – II =

Talesavara_Siva_temple
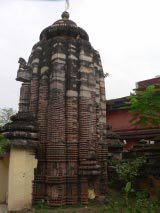

- Location in Orissa

Religion
- Affiliation: Hinduism
- Deity: Lord Shiva

Location
- Location: Bhubaneswar
- State: Orissa
- Country: India
- Interactive map of Talesavara_Siva_temple
- Coordinates: 20°14′43″N 85°50′33″E

Architecture
- Type: Kalingan
- Completed: 12-13th century A.D.
- Elevation: 22 m (72 ft)

Talesavara Siva Temple – II is a Hindu temple located in Bhubaneswar, Orissa, India. Talesvara Siva temple is located in the Bharati Matha precinct in Badhaibanka chowk, Old town, Bhubaneswar. The shrine includes a Siva lingam and a circular shrine. The upper part of the temple was renovated by Matha authorities with the financial support of a devotee.

It is owned by Bharti Matha. Pranava Kishore Bharati Goswami is the Matha Mahanta.

== Physical description ==
- This temple is situated within the precinct of Bharati matha. It is surrounded by the burials of the Matha Mahantas in the east and Matha entrance in the north.
- The temple faces west.
- The building is made up off Coarse grained sandstone and shows dry masonry technique.
- The anuratha paga of the temple is decorated with a series of ghata-pallava.
- The temple is partially buried up to the pabhaga portion.

== Condition ==
- The western side is partly damaged.
- The carvings in the temple walls are largely eroded.
- A super cyclone caused severe damage, which was repaired by Bharati Matha
