= Lokanatha Siva Temple =

Coordinates: 20.240556°N 85.834722°E

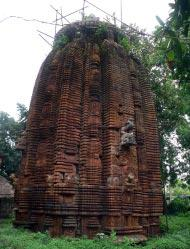
Amunha Deula or Lokanatha Siva Temple

Lokanatha Siva Temple also Amunha Deula is an 11th-century AD temple in Bhubaneswar (Lat.20°14’26"N., Long.85°50’05"E., Elev.71 ft) in the state of Odisha, India. It represents a proto type of Lingaraja in a miniature form. Lokanatha Siva temple is located in front of the Lingaraja temple in the south eastern corner across the road and adjacent to Lingaraja Temple Police Station in Old Town, Bhubaneswar. Until 1972 the temple was buried from all sides up to the bandhana portion, giving an impression as if the temple had no entrance. Hence people called it Amuha deula. In 1972 Debala Mitra conducted an excavation in front of the northern wall and exposed the entrance. The sanctum was empty. However, on the basis of the local traditions and the sculptural embellishment on the outer wall it was ascribed to Lord Siva. It is now known both as Lokanatha Siva and Amuha deula. People ascribe the temple to the Kesharis (Somavamsis). Except the entrance all other sides it is buried up to the bandhana.

Currently the temple is abandoned and in a very bad state of preservation. The structure is crumbling.it has not been well preserved.

== History ==
Architectural features suggests that it was built in the Somavamsi Period during the 11th Century A.D. It is considered to be a prototype of Lingaraja in a lesser scale may be earlier than Lingaraja as a modest experimentation before conceiving the gigantic and grand Lingaraja.

== Physical description ==
The temple is surrounded by Lingaraja police station compound wall in north and east, residential buildings in south and orth-west corner and office of the Lingaraja Temple Administration in the west. The temple is facing towards north.

=== Architectural features ===
The temple is constructed in the Kalingan style using ocherous sandstone and dry masonry construction technique. The main temple is a Rekha Deul. On plan, the temple has a vimana and a frontal porch. The vimana is a pancharatha that measures 8.00 square metres. The frontal porch is 0.50 metres. On elevation, the vimana is of rekha order. Since the temple is buried up to the bandhana mouldings nothing can be definitely said about the pista, pabhaga and tala jangha. But taking into account the visible architectural members we can surmise that the temple belonged to the mature phase and had a panchanga bada. With fivefold divisions of the pabhaga and tala jangha must have accommodated the parsvadevata niches in the raha paga along with pidha-mundi in anuratha and kanika pagas. Bandhana measures 0.35 metres has three mouldings. The upara jangha measures 1.10 metres, baranda with ten mouldings measures 1.20 metres. The temple is richly carved. The gandi is decorated with four angasikharas in descending order in anuratha paga and the kanika paga is decorated with ten bhumis, each bhumi is surmounted by a bhumi amla. Mastaka has usual beki, amlaka, khapuri. There are four large size images in the beki above the rahapaga on each side. The base of the gandi above the baranda the raha paga is relieved with the carving of an intricate Bho-motif flanked by makara motifs on either sides. Raha niches of the temple are buried.

=== Decorative features ===
The upper jangha has pidha mundis in anuratha and kanika pagas. The niches within the mundis enshrine various Saivite divinities like Bhairavas, Ardhanarisvara, Mahisasuramardini, Lakulisa etc. along with carvings of naga-nagis, vyalas, nayikas, etc.

The doorjambs of this temple are carved with three vertical bands of lata, patra and puspa sakha from interior to exterior. It measures 2.00 metres in height and 0.95 metres in width. At the base of the jambs the dvarapala niches measure 0.40 metres x 0.22 metres that houses Saivite dvarapalas holding trident in left hands and the right hands in varada mudra.

The original lintel has been replaced by renovated plain stone slab.

It is an important monument in view of its striking resemblance with Lingaraja in its architectural features, sculptural decoration and ornamentation.

== Present condition ==
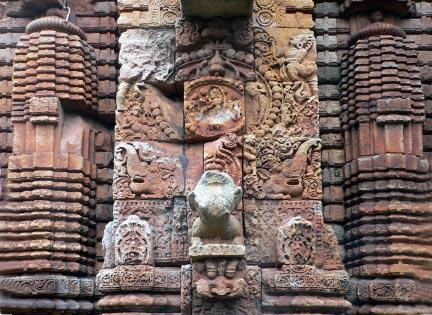
Present state of decay

The temple structure is heavily weathered and eroded due to the poor quality of stone and total neglect. Also, several cracks have developed in the gandi and in the visible portions of the bada. Conservation problems and threats to the property are in the form of

1. The temple is buried up to the bandhana level,
2. Sanctum is used as a garbage pit,
3. Several cracks on the gandi,
4. growth of vegetation on the gandi and mastaka,
5. Carvings on the walls have largely been eroded

== Picture gallery ==
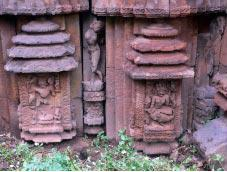
Decorative carvings depicting divinities

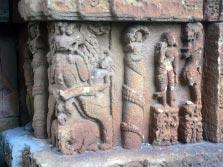
Decorative carvings of naga-nagis, vyalas, nayikas, etc.

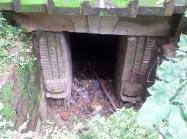
Doorjambs and lintel
