= Alasa Kanya =

Female sculptural form on Indian temples

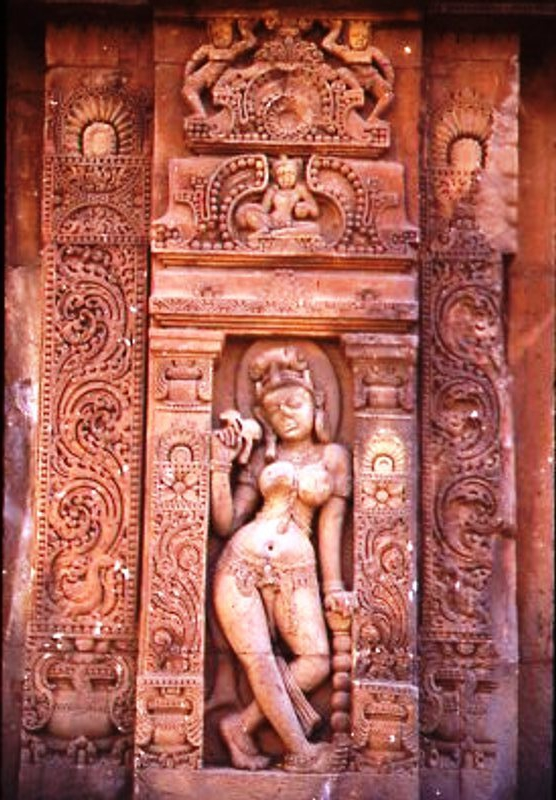
Alasa kanya in a niche, in Vaital Deul temple, Bhubaneswar, constructed in 8th century.

Alasa Kanya (Sanskrit: अलसकन्या, romanized: Alasakanyā) is a form of Surasundari in Indian iconography, which portrays an indolent female or maiden. There are several forms and representation of this imagery, observed mainly in temple architecture from medieval period in the form of sculptures. It is believed these female representations are a dedication to Devi and her characteristics. Several such forms adorn the temples of Odisha.

== History and origin ==
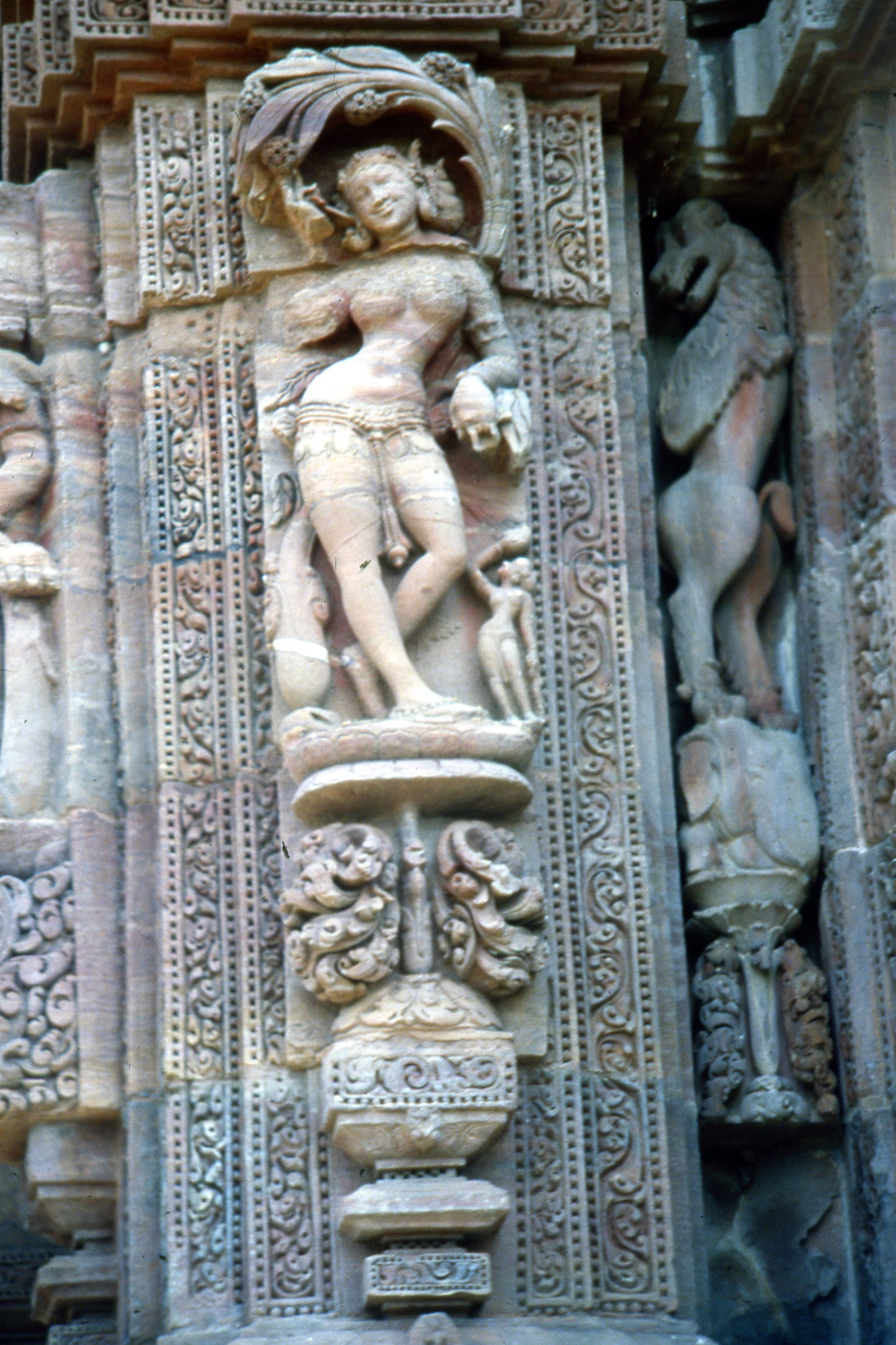
Alasa Kanya in Raja Rani Temple, Bhubaneswar

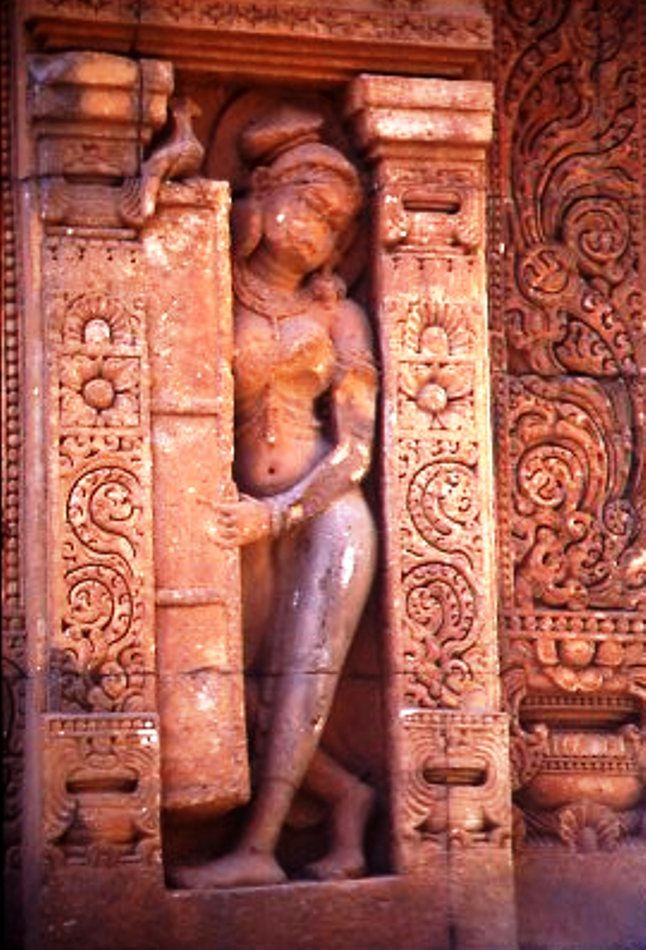
Shukasarika form of alasa kanaya with a parrot in Vaital Deul, temple, Bhubaneswar.

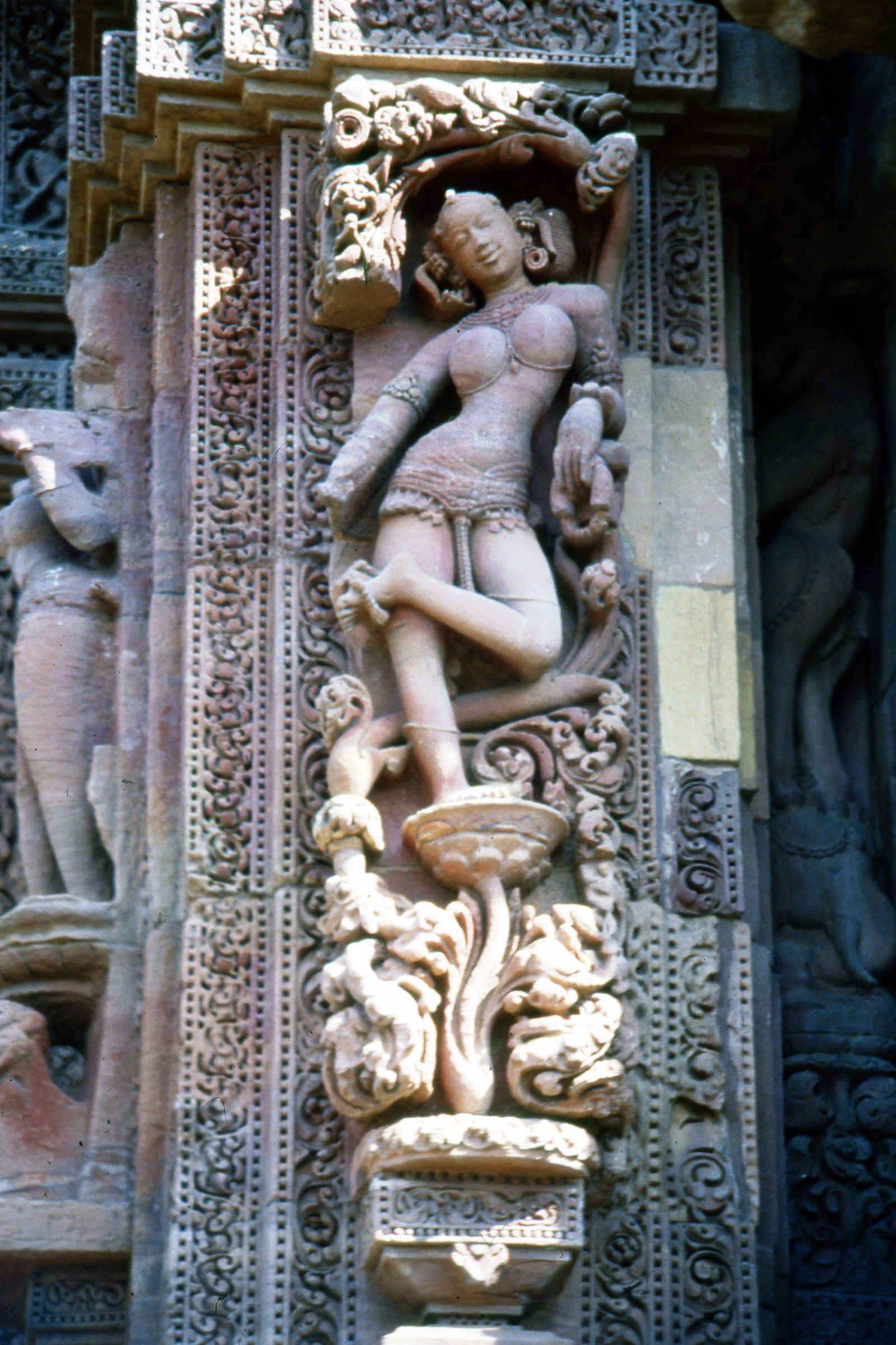
Rajarani temple, Bhubaneshwar, from 11th century depicting an alasa kanya.

Dominantly there are three types of female imagery in Hindu temple architecture – divine, semi-divine and secular. The divine images are a portrayal of goddesses, standing alone as well as with Vishnu, Brahma and Shiva. Other female depictions often seen on the temples such as Apsara and Surasundari are considered to be semi-divine. They are at times also represented as attendants of female divine figure. Apart from the divine and semi-divine, the earthly female representation is define as secular. Some scholars define Alasa Kanya as earthly Nayikas, although one of the prominent scholar, Donaldson refers Alasa Kanya as an Apsara, who are the semi-divine figures. One of the earliest reference to Alasa Kanya is in a 9th-century manual Shilpa Prakasha.

== Form and postures ==
Alasa Kanya is depicted in an erotic manner, to enchant man with their playful glances. Common posture of Alasa Kanya is with her hands above her head in uromandali hasta, however their postures change in accordance to their position or placement in the temple. In some instances alasa kanya figures are standing together in a row, this is referred as Nari Bandhan by Shilpa Prakasha. Different postures of Alasa Kanya is derived from Alasa Yantra or a magical diagram which depicts the line for varying postures.

Shilpa Prakash, the historic text defines minimum sixteen forms of Alasa Kanya: Torana (one forming an arch), Mugdha (innocent and simple), Manini (resentful offended), Dalamalika (pulling down a branch of tree), Padmagandha (smelling the lotus), Darpana (holding a mirror), Vinyasa (thoughtful and meditative), Ketakibharana (wearing ketaki blossom), Matrmurti (the mother with child ), Chamara (one holding a fly whisk), Gunthana (the one who hides herself), Nartaki (dancer), Shukasarika (One playing with a parrot), Nupurpadika (one wearing anklets) and Mardala (drummer).

Alasa Kanya depiction can also be discussed in reference to the evolution of temple architecture in Odisha. During the 8th century, the female figures such as Alasa Kanya sculptures are placed alone inside the niches, surrounded by scrolls, the sculptures given impression of being self-absorbent with revealing any emotion and seldomly the figures jut out of their niches. Progressing to the 10th century with the development of Panch Ratha plan, figures of alasa kanya are placed on the corners of the temples, here the sculptures are not confined to the niches but are carved in relief and is part of different scenes. From 11th century onwards the figure becomes more beautiful and is some of the best examples of alasa kanya sculptures. As the height of the temples become double storey, the figures are placed above the eye level giving an impression that they are celestial or heavenly beings.

== Types ==
The sixteen types of Alasa Kanya mentioned in the text of Shilpa Prakasha is described below

Torana	Torana means a gateway, generally in case of the temples. As the name suggests the alasa kanya form arch arch or a gateway by joining her hands above her head.
Mugdha	She is portrayed as a female adorned with jewellery with her right hand in naga mudra and left is resting on her hips.
Manini	Manini is also adorned with jewellery along with fine draperies. Her left hand touches the lower and the other hand is raised, which also believed to depict pride. Her eyes are just slightly open and the mouth is ajar, while lower lip expressing lasya bhava.
Dalmalika	The alasya kanya is holding tip of a branch with her right hand and the other end of the branch with left. The origin of this figure could be ashoka dahoda
Padmagandha	She is the most beautiful, holding a lotus in her left hand and bending towards it, while her hands rest on her hips.
Darpana	One of the most widely depicted alasa kanya, holding amirron in one hand and admiring her beauty with her hair in the front. The mirror can be placed in any of the hands, as per the artist. This figure is seen in bellur and Khajuro too.
Vinayasa	The maiden is in a meditative mood with her hand in karakacchapika mudra, in the shape of an oyster and the other hand is in japa naysa, as if chanting god's name.
Ketakibharana	The alasya is standing cross legged holding a ketaki flower and has wide hips. The figure is considered to be auspicious.
Matrmurti	The left hand holds a baby and the right rests on her hips. This image is a depiction of fertility cult.
Camara	The posture is same as matrmurti, in this case she holds a fly wishk instead of a chinf and holds her drapery with other hand.
Gunthana	She is shown from her backside, standing with a virile attitude and her legs crossed.
Nartaki	She represents a celestial dancer with her legs crossed and body swaying in a dance form.
Shukasarika	The maiden is adorned with a parrot which could be replaced with a maina.
Nupurpadika	The maiden has a beautiful body and is bending down on her left to tie or untie her anklet, holding a lotus bud in the right hand.
Mardala	She is the sole musician in the group of 16, shown to be playing an instrument and her facial features depict as she is lost in music.

== See also ==
- Rajarani Temple
- Konark Sun Temple
