= Surasundari =

Female representation in Indian iconography

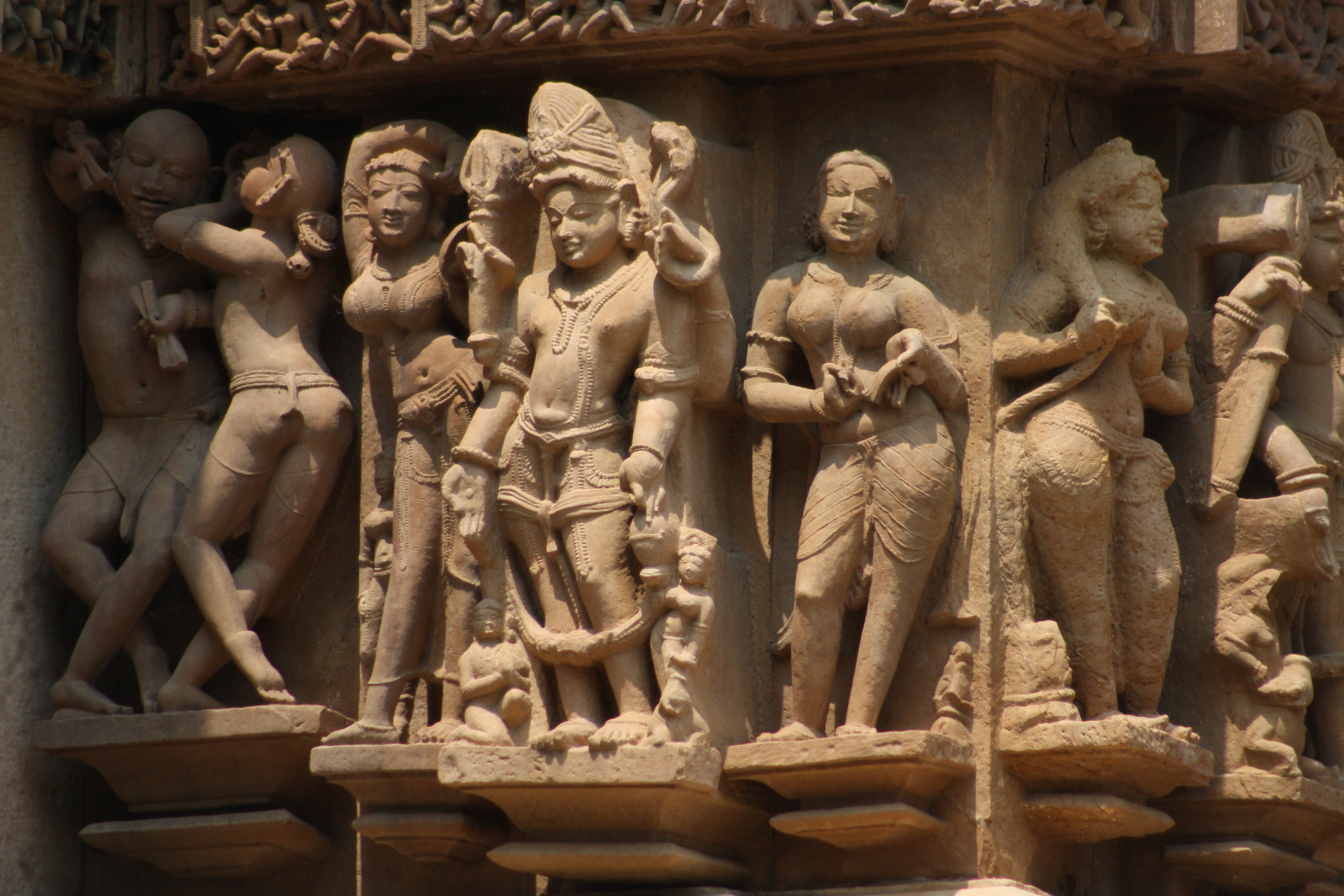
A group of surasundaris on Lakshmana Temple in Khajuraho

As a house without a wife, as a frolic without a woman, so without the surasundari, the monument will be inferior and bear no fruit.

— Shilpa-Prakasha, 9th century architectural treatise

In Indian art, a surasundari (Sanskrit: सुरसुन्दरी, romanized: Surasundarī, lit. 'beautiful goddess') is a young maiden characterizing feminine beauty and graceful sensuality.

Buddhist and Jain shrines have featured sensual figures in form of yakshis and other spirits since 2nd century BCE. However, the surasundari motif gained prominence in Indian temple architecture only around the beginning of the 9th century CE. Shilpa-Prakasha, a 9th-century Tantric architectural treatise, declares a monument without a surasundari as inferior and fruitless. The 15th-century text Kshirarnava states that the surasundaris should be depicted looking down (adho-drishti), not looking at someone.

In temple sculptures, the surasundaris are often depicted as attendants of gods and goddesses. They also manifest as dancing apsaras. A salabhanjika or tree nymph is another variation of a surasundari. Other forms of a surasundari include:

- Darpani (mirror holder)
- Torana (door leaner)
- Dalamalika (branch holder)
- Padmagandha (smelling like a lotus)
- Ketakibharana (with a ketaki flower)
- Matrika (mother)
- Chamari (fly whisk bearer)
- Nartaki (dancer)
- Shukasarika (one who plays with a parrot)
- Nupurapadika (one who ties anklets)
- Mardala (drummer)
- Alasyakanya (lazy)
- Shubhagamini (thorn remover)

The presence of surasundaris in religious shrines is interpreted in several ways. A spiritual interpretation is that they represent shakti (the feminine cosmic energy), and can be considered as both auspicious and empowering. A secular interpretation is that they represent the prosperity of the king who commissioned the temple.
