= Rajarani Temple =

11th-century Hindu temple in Odisha, India

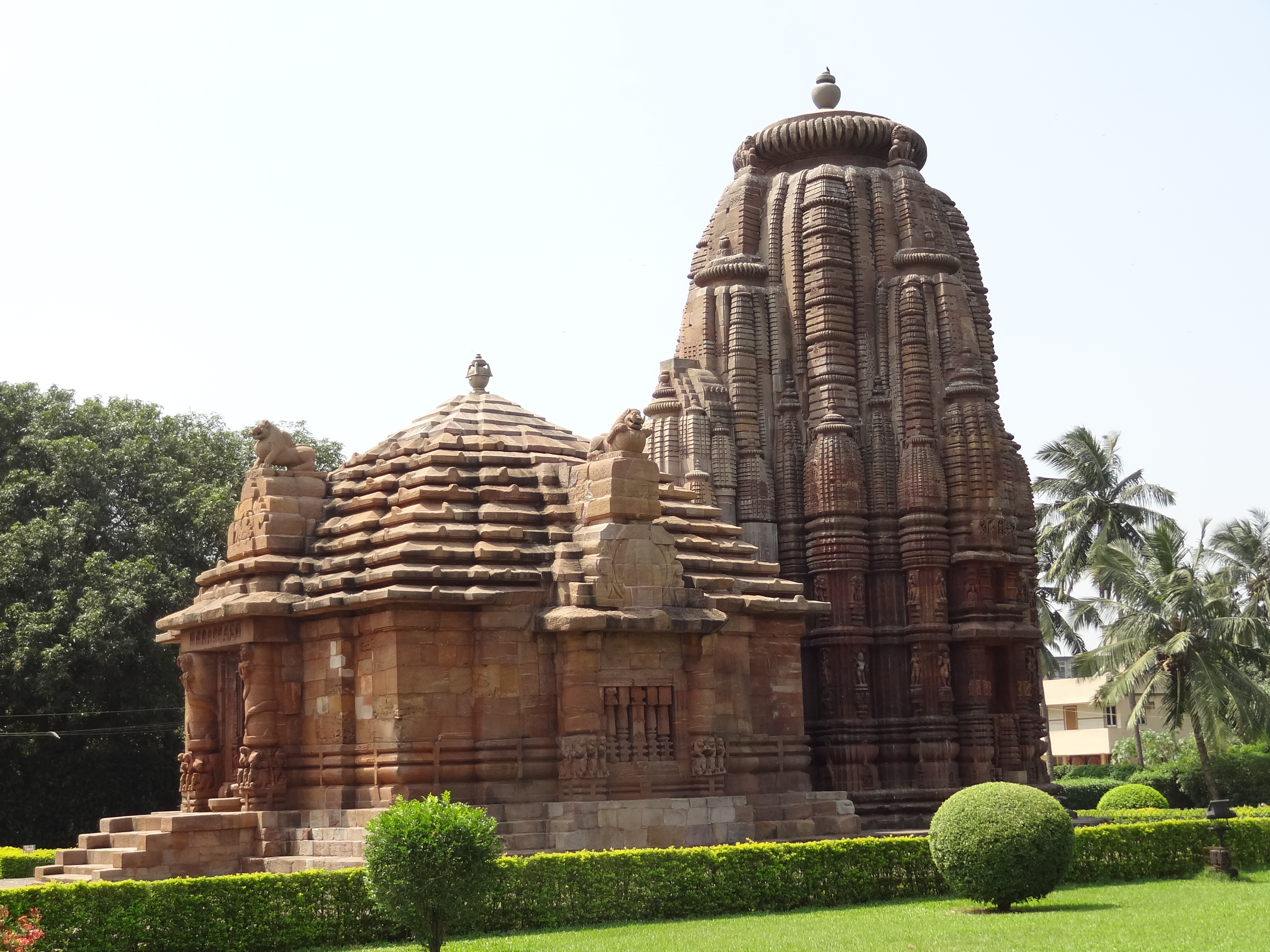

- Location in Odisha Rajarani Temple (India)

Religion
- Affiliation: Hinduism
- Deity: Shiva

Location
- Location: Bhubaneswar
- State: Odisha
- Country: India
- Coordinates: 20°14′36.4″N 85°50′36.68″E

Architecture
- Type: Kalingan Pancharatha Style (Kalinga Architecture)
- Completed: 11th century CE

Rajarani Temple is an 11th-century CE Hindu temple located in Bhubaneswar, the capital city of Odisha (Orissa previously), India. Believed to be devoted to Lord Shiva, the shrine is called Raja Rani because it is made of yellow and red sandstone and the two colors are locally called ‘Raja Rani’.

== Overview ==
The temple is believed to have been known originally as Indreshvara. It is locally known as a "love temple" because of the erotic carvings of women and men and couples in the temple. Rajarani Temple is built in the pancharatha style on a raised platform with two structures: a central shrine called the vimana (sanctum) with a bada (curvilinear spire) over its roof rising to a height of 18 m (59 ft), and a viewing hall called jagamohana with a pyramidal roof. The temple was constructed of dull red and yellow sandstone locally called "Rajarani". There are no images inside the sanctum, and hence it is not associated with a specific sect of Hinduism but broadly classified as Shaivite based on the niches.

== History ==
Based on the sculptural architectural style, the temple is dated to the mid-11th century CE. Brown, groups the temple along with Ananta Vasudeva Temple and places it around the 11th–12th centuries CE. Another survey of Orissa temples carried out by S. K. Sarasvati in 1953 CE yielded a similar date. Panigrahi, who did a comprehensive analysis of Odia temples, gives an unspecified date between Lingaraja Temple and Mukteshvara Temple. Fergusson believes construction of the temple begun in 1105 CE. George Michell believes the temple was built during the same time as Lingaraja Temple. Rajarani Temple roughly belongs to the same period as the Jagannatha Temple at Puri. The architecture of other temples in central India originated from this temple. The notable ones in the category are the Khajuraho temples and Toteshvara Mahadeva temple in Kadava. Scholars believe, based on the style that the temple might have been built by Somavamshi kings and queens who migrated from Central india to Orissa during the period. Rajarani temple is maintained by the Archaeological Survey of India (ASI) as a ticketed monument.

== Architecture ==
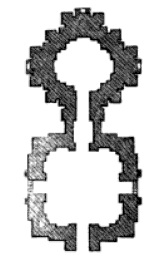
Temple plan of Rajarani temple, scale 50 ft to 1 inch

The Odia temples have two parts namely the sanctum (deul) and the other is the place from where pilgrims view the sanctum (called jagamohana). The initial deul temples were without the jagamohana as seen in some of the older temples in Bhubaneswar while the later temples had two additional structures namely nata-mandapa (festival hall) and bhoga-mandapa (hall of offerings). The vimana is square in plan, and the walls are variegated by ressaults (called rathas or pagas). Amalaka (also called mastaka), a stone disk with ridges on the rim, is placed over the bada (tower) of the temple. Rajarani Temple stands on a raised platform. The temple was constructed of dull red and yellow sandstone locally called "Rajarani".

=== Vimana ===
It is pancharatha in plan with a curvilinear superstructure (rekha shikhara) 18 m (55 ft) tall. The vimana (tower) is surrounded by a cluster of miniature towers with double crowning elements and appears round, unlike other temples in Bhubaneswar but like the towers of Khajuraho temples. The temple stands on a plinth with three mouldings. The bada consists of five divisions instead of the three divisions usually found in other temples. The vimana rises to a height of 17.98 metres (59.0 ft) from the basement. The vimana (sanctum) measures 10.25 ft (3.12 m)*10.25 ft (3.12 m) from the inside, 31 ft (9.4 m)*29 ft (8.8 m) from the outside. Its spire is decorated with clusters of turrets (replication of the spire itself) emerging from the rib of the spire. The temple has panchanga bada, or five divisions, namely, pabhaga, talajangha, bandhana, uparajangha and baranda. The lowermost division, called the pabhaga, has five decorative mouldings, namely, khura, kumbha, patta, kani and basanta. The superstructure (gandi) of the temple has a number of miniature turrets (angashikharas). The superstructure is crowned with a fluted disc-shaped architectural piece called an amalaka, and a vase (kalasa) surmounts it as the crowning finial.

=== Jagamohana ===
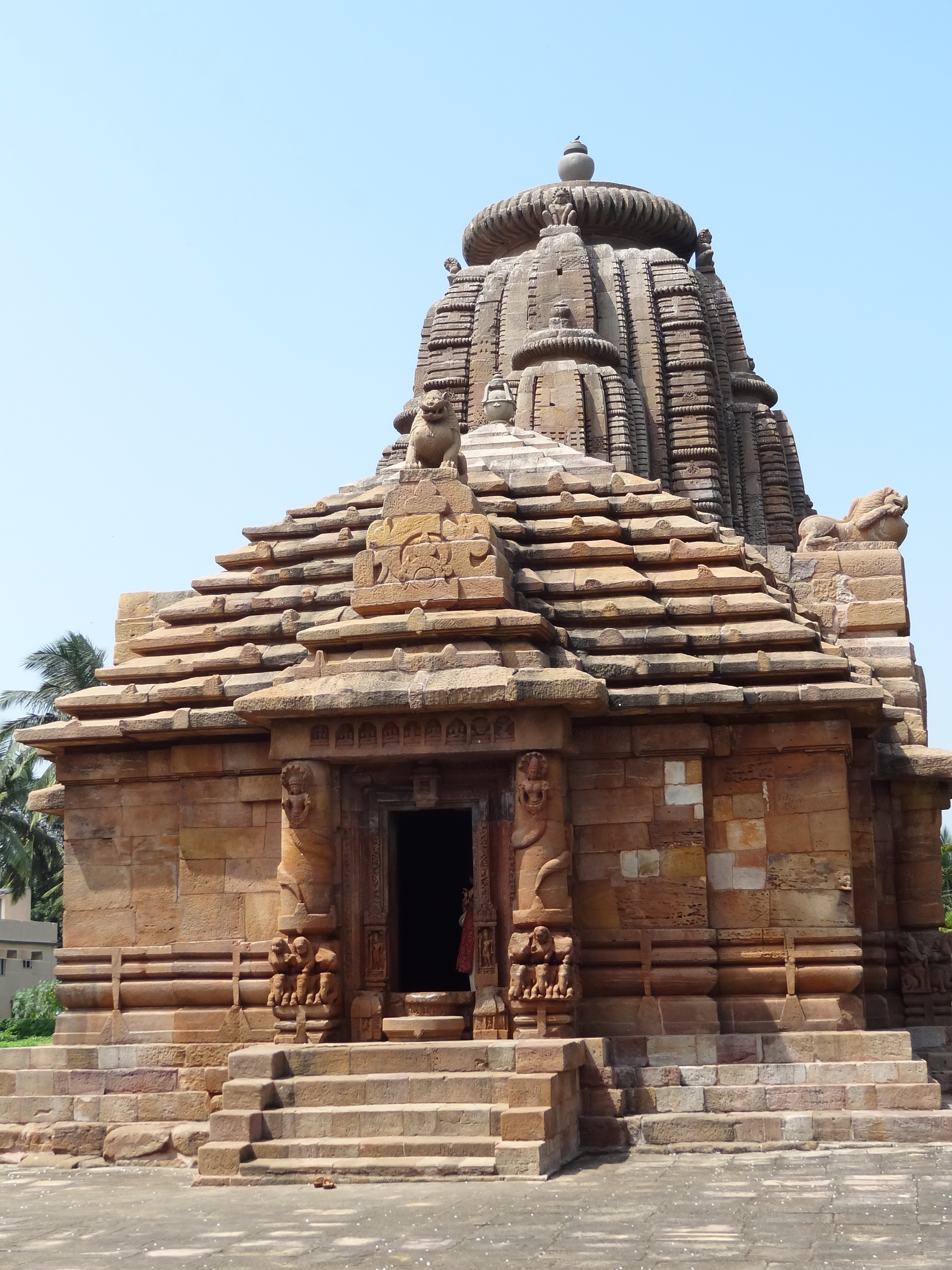
The front portion of the jagamohana depicts nagins and guarding deities in the doorjambs, with vimana in the background.

The jagamohana (porch), though demonstrating a pyramidal structure, takes on the status of a complete structure on its own. It bears signs of the repair done in 1903 CE when it collapsed into ruins. The jagamohana measures 17.83 ft (5.43 m)*17.83 ft (5.43 m) from the inside and 36 ft (11 m)*36 ft (11 m) from the outside. The tiered (pidha) jagamohana and the interior are completed and plain. The plan of the jagamohana is square compared to the rectangular ones present in earlier temples.

=== Sculptures ===
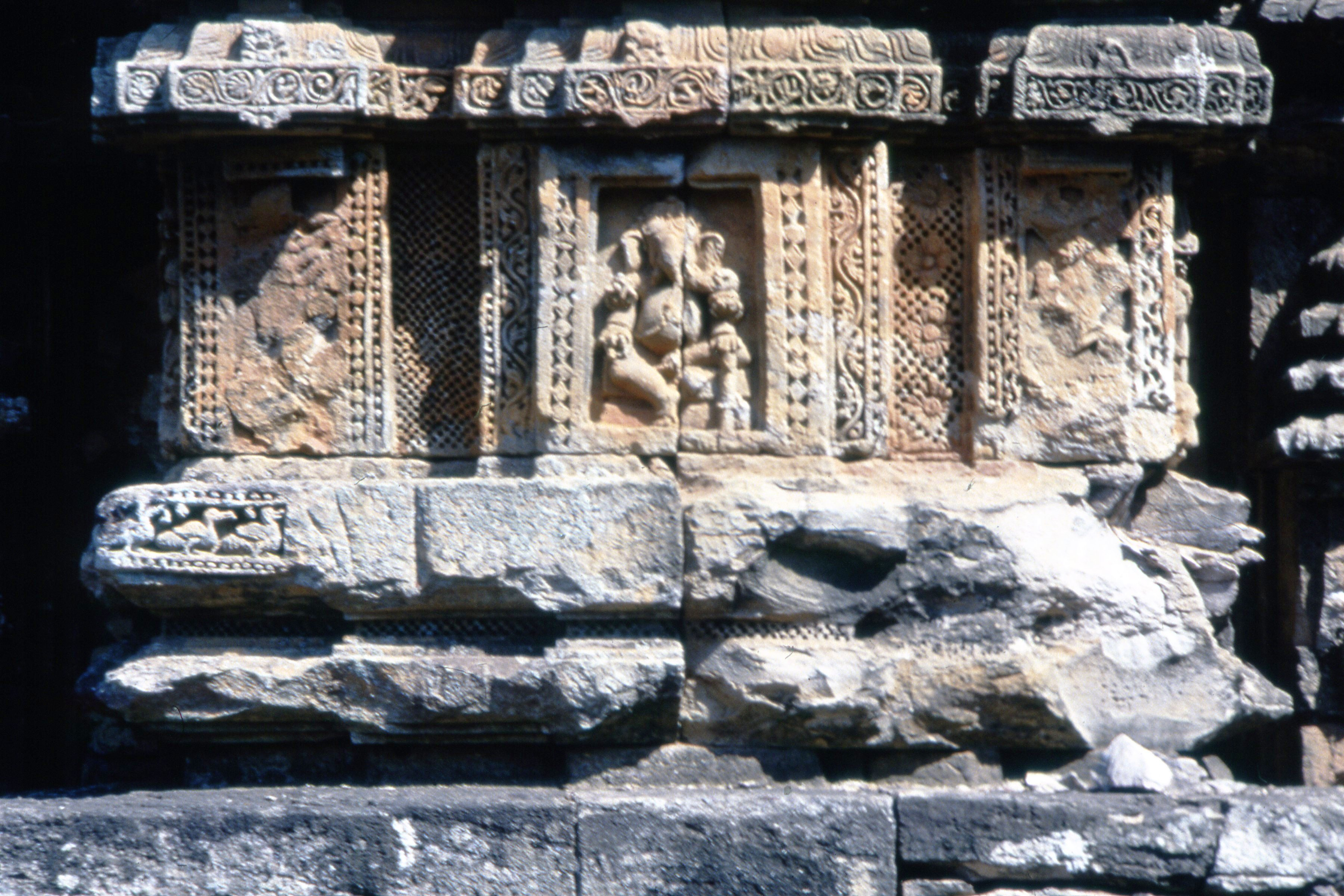
A niche dedicated to Ganesha.

The sculptures have a depth that was lacking in the Mukteshvara Temple sculptures. The slightly projecting entrance is flanked by round thick columns entwined by nagas on the left. Guardians of the eight directions project from the base of the temple in the eight directions, starting from the gateway in a clockwise direction around the porch and the deul, ending at the torana (entrance). The other noted sculptures are naga-nagini sthambha, shaiva dvarapalas on the entrance doorjambs, and lakulisas on the lintel of entrance, above which is the architrave of Navagrahas. The best-preserved sculptures of the temple are the standing ashtadikpalas on the central facade of kanika, appearing on the jangha portion of the bada clad in diaphanous drapery. The image of Varuna is intact and notable for its body ornamentation, coiffure and facial expression. Scenes of the marriage of Shiva, Nataraja, and Parvati are the cult images present in the temple. There are tall, slender, sophisticated nayikas gracing the walls of the sanctum depicted in various roles and moods in amorous dalliance with actions such as turning their head from an emaciated ascetic, fondling her child, holding a branch of tree, attending to her toilet, looking into mirror, taking off her anklet, caressing her pet bird and playing instrument. There are also erotic (mithuna) figures carved in high relief on the projecting portions of the uparajangha. The other decorative motifs are carved in the shape of vyala, jagrata and gajakranta. The scroll motifs are of foliage, creepers and vines (vanalata), each containing lush foliage.

== Religious significance ==
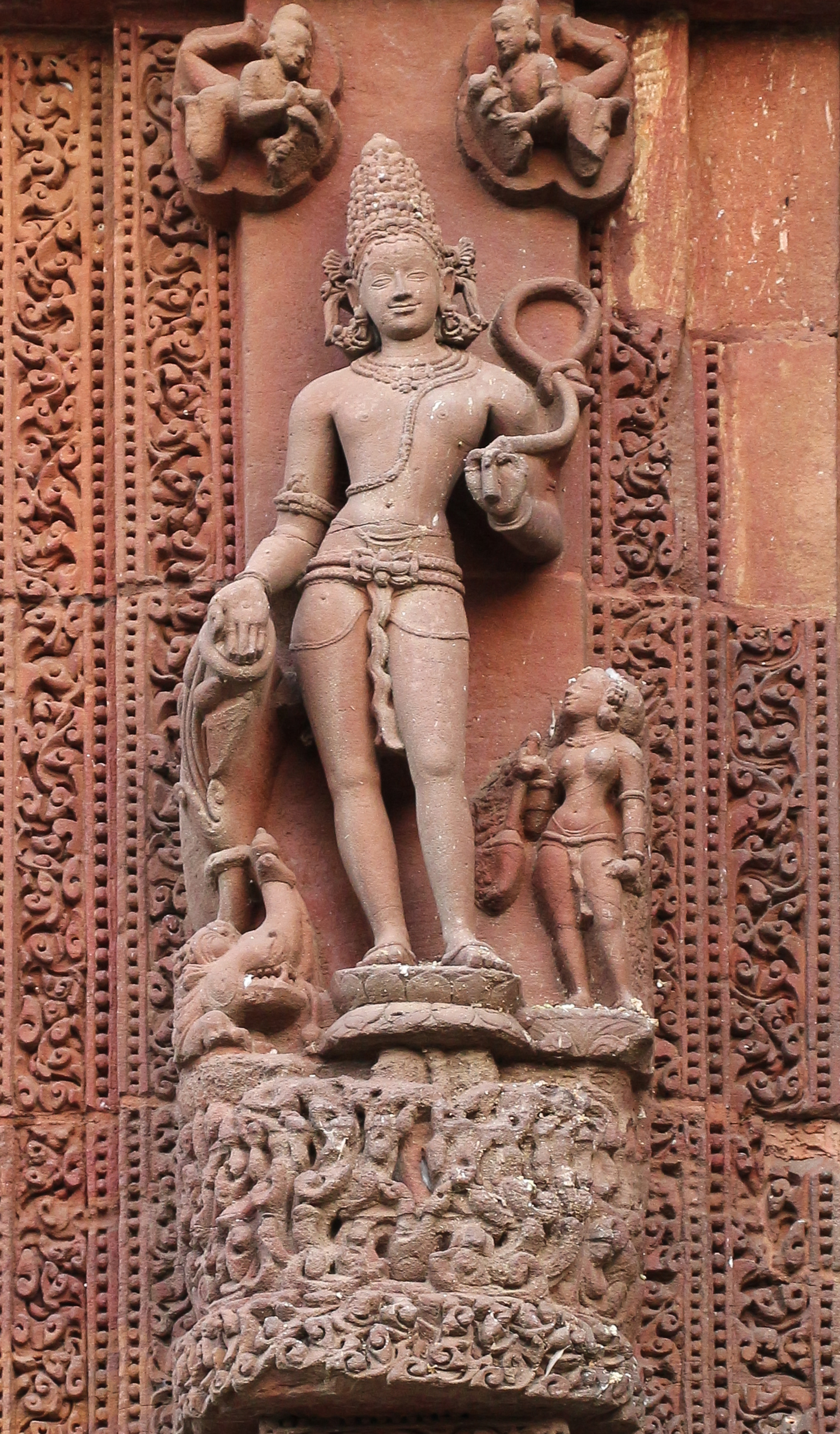
A statue of Varuna on the walls of the sanctum

The historian M. M. Ganguly examined the Khuraprista (upper plinth), which is carved like a lotus with its petals, and described the temple as possibly dedicated to Vishnu. The names of most Shiva and Parvati temples in Bhubaneswar end with "Ishvara" like Parasurameshvara, Brahmeshvara and Mitreshvara. But Rajarani Temple bears a peculiar name and contains no images of any deity inside the sanctum. There are certain features of the temple which indicates a Shaivite origin such as the presence of Shaiva doorkeepers: Prachanda and Chanda, Dvarapla with jatamukha, and a garland of skulls and a snake. K. C. Panigrahi believes that, based on the Ekamra Purana, the temple was originally called Indreshvara and that it was positioned to the east of Siddheshvara Temple. The image of Lakulisha, the founder of the Pashupatha sect of Shaivisim, in a seated posture with yogamuthra along with his disciples, is found in the lintel of the jagamohana. Images of eight bearded ascetics are arranged on both sides of the images of Lakulisha. There are three panels on the facade of the main temple showing images of Shiva dancing with his consort Parvati in the company of attendants playing musical instruments. A carving depicting the marriage of Shiva and Parvati is on the western side below the central niche. The presence of Naga and Nagini at the entrance led to a local belief that it is the king (Raja) and queen (Rani) who are associated with the temple, leading to the name Rajarani, but this belief is not accepted by historians.

== Festivals ==
The Department of Tourism of the Government of Odisha organises a Rajarani music festival at the temple every year from 18 to 20 January. The temple focuses on classical music, and all three styles of classical music – Hindustani, Carnatic and Odissi – are given equal importance. Musicians from different parts of the country perform during the three-day festival. The festival was started in 2003 CE with the help of the Bhubaneswar Music Circle (BMC).

== See also ==
- List of temples in Bhubaneswar

== In popular culture ==
- In Killer in Kailash, Satyajit Ray's novel in The Adventures of Feluda series
