= Kalinga architecture =

Architecture style in Odisha

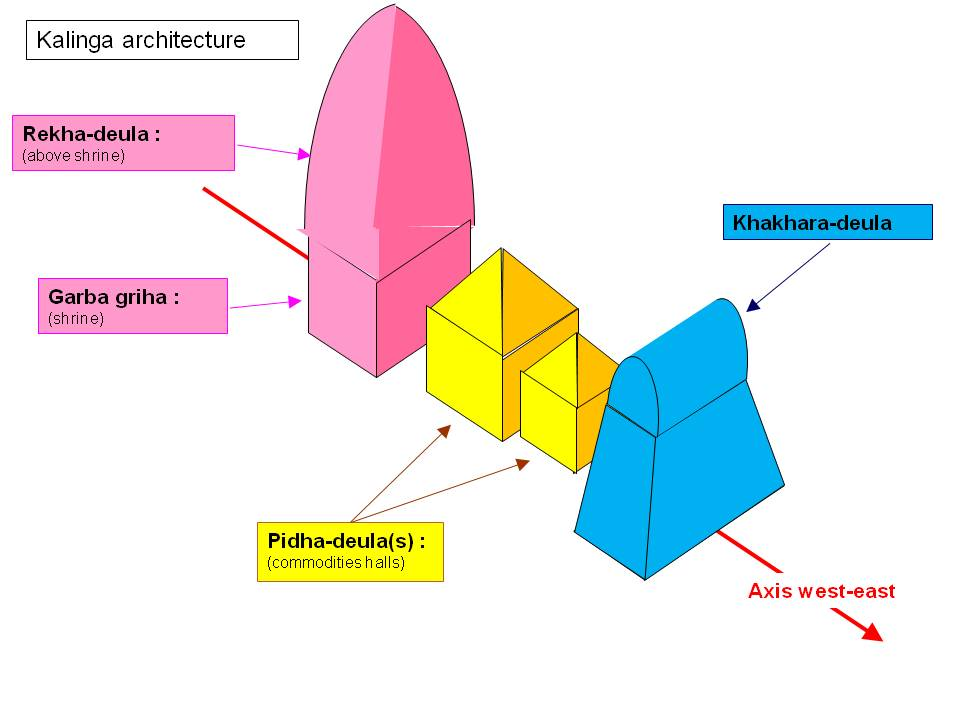
Simplified schema of a Kalinga architecture temple

The Kaliṅga architectural style is a style of Hindu architecture which flourished in the ancient Kalinga, also known as Utkal and in present eastern Indian state of Odisha. The style consists of three distinct types of temples: Rekha Deula, Pidha Deula and Khakhara Deula. The former two are associated with Vishnu, Surya and Shiva temples while the third is mainly with Chamunda and Durga temples. The Rekha Deula and Khakhara Deula houses are the sanctum sanctorum while the Pidha Deula constitutes outer dancing and offering halls.

In Kalinga, the ancient land of Shakta cult, divine iconography existed since the mythological era. Present day research implies that idols (deities) were placed under auspicious trees in the ancient days. The various aspects of a typical Kalinga temple include architectural stipulations, iconography, historical connotations and honoring the traditions, customs and associated legends.

== Architecture ==
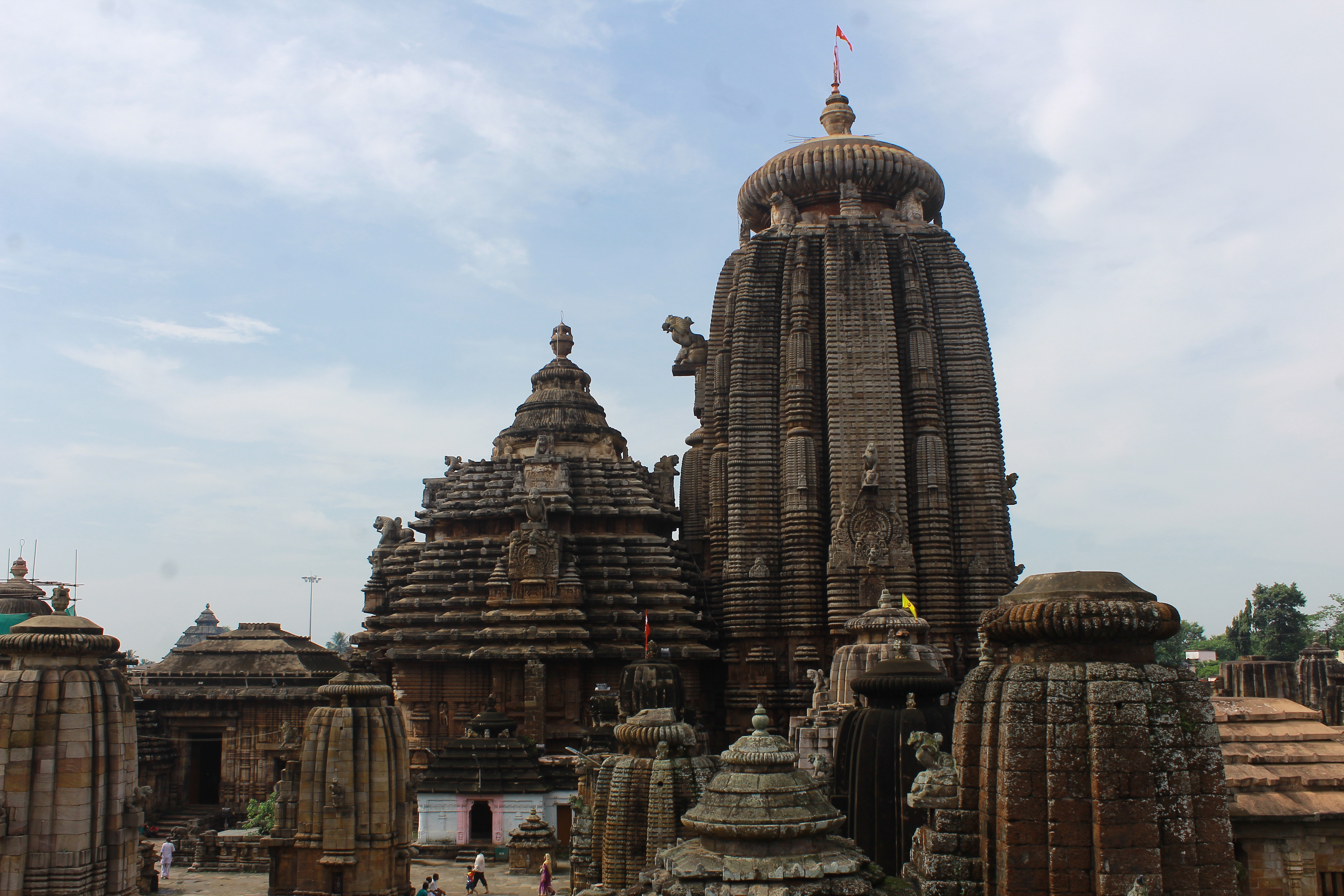
The Lingaraja Temple, a revered pilgrimage center and the culminating result of the architectural tradition at Bhubaneswar, sixth century AD.

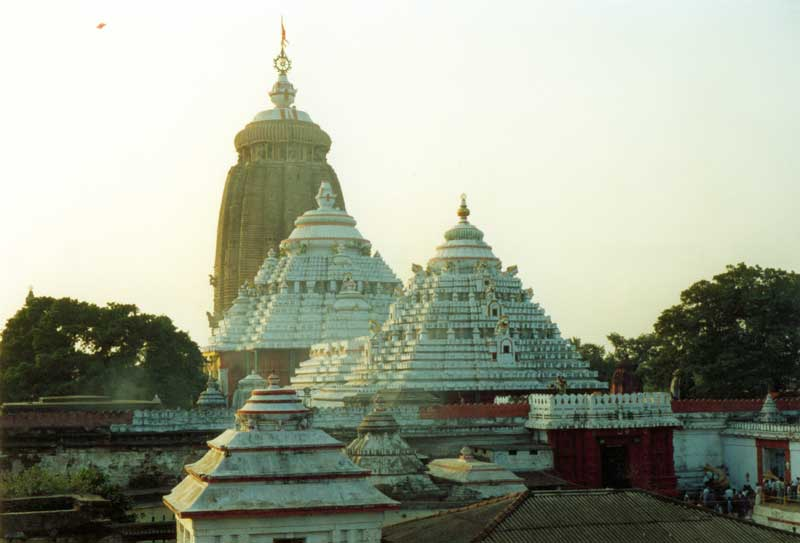
The Jagannath Temple, one of the four holiest places (Dhamas) of Hinduism, in the coastal town of Puri in Odisha.

=== Selecting people ===
There is a specific hierarchy of command for the management of people involved. They are classified as:

1. Kartā : The Chief Patron of the temple, generally the king of the state is designated as kartā. Hence these devotional ancient architectures often reflect various socio-cultural aspects of society of the time.
2. Mukhya Sthapati : The Chief Architect, The master of the Shilpa Shastras, Vastu Shastra, Dharma Shastra, Agni Purana and Mathematical Calculations. Besides being a very knowledgeable person he is also a very pious man. He translates the Kartā's vision into an architectural design based on stipulations.
3. Sutra Grahaṇi : The Chief Engineer (can be equated) as he is the person who translates the architecture into actual geometrical dimensions. He is equally proficient in all the required knowledge and most often is the son of the Mukhya Sthapati.
4. Bārdhanikas : The masons, the stone setters
5. Takṣaka : The sculptor with hands that create poetry in stone does all the magnificent carvings and engravings of various forms that has left us spell bound.

Besides these primary set of specialists, various supportive functions are carried out by other people.

=== Material selection ===
Primarily certain classes of stones are considered auspicious for the construction of Kalinga deula (temples). The Shilpa Chandrika, an ancient architecture book defines seven specific varieties of stone as ideal and certain types are used for certain portions of the temple:

1. Sahaṇa
2. Chhita Sāhaṇa
3. Baḍa Pagaḍa
4. Dhobā Kuṇḍa
5. Rasa Chiṇḍa
6. Niḷa Kusāṇa

Although clay bricks have been used in very rare cases, most Kalingan temples are built using these stones.

=== Site selection ===
Various aspects like type of soil, shape and location of the plot, availability and type of space and ground water level, etc. are taken into consideration while selecting the site. Color, density, composition and moisture content of the soil discriminates between the best, middle, sub-middle and worst kind of soil. Based on Vastu Shastra, a rectangular, square, elliptical or circular plot of land is selected in order of preference.

=== Naga Bāndhēṇi ===
This is an intricate and very old method in Shilpa Shastra, by which the temple's direction and the auspicious moment for beginning the sacred construction is determined. Like the present day Geomorphology, Seismology, Topology etc., probably this is some ancient science which guides the architect to understand natural forces and build stable massive structures in Odisha.

=== Scale model ===
The Mukhya Sthaptya (Main Sculptor similar to Chief Architect) creates a scale model based on traditional stipulations and takes the Karta's (producer / financier) approval. In many instances we see such depictions on walls and motifs.

== Potā and piṭha (mobile foundation) ==
By observing conventional masonry and going through the following steps of the preparation of potā and piṭha the foundation of a temple could be understood:

1. A square or rectangular area is dug out depending on the type and combination of temple proposed at the center of the preselected Nāgabandhani plot of land.
2. The depth of this Potā is 1/3 of the height of the proposed temple, from plinth level.
3. The length and width of this Potā (pit) is always sufficiently broader than the diameter of the proposed temple.
4. Hard stone slabs are laid at the bottom to create a level.
5. Then with uniformly cut hard stones, the four walls of the Potā are erected and the outer perimeter space between the pit wall and ground is properly filled with soil.
6. The Asṭadala Padma Chakaḍā (Eight lotus petal shaped), is then laid at the exact spot required. This is a square or rectangular shape of hard uniform stone slab at the center of which an eight petaled lotus shape in exact geometric proportions is engraved. The petals are aligned to the north, north-east, east, southeast, south, south-west, west and north-west. The exact perpendicular line through the center of this Asṭadala Padma Chakaḍā determines the axis (rekhā/meru) of the temple. The traditional method of such alignment is termed as Sanku.
7. Thereafter the Potā is properly packed up with large pieces of stone and soil, probably pressed down by elephants.
8. The Potā (pit) is leveled off at ground level with huge and thick cut theodolite stones.
9. Another layer of theodolite stones, corresponding to the shape and size of the ground plan called the piṭha is constructed. This is the base of the temple. In many instances, we see this piṭha at various levels of elevation.

=== Bhunaksā (the ground plan) ===
Keeping the Sanku (the vertical axis through the center of Asṭadala Padma Chakaḍā) as the exact center of Garbhagruha, the ground plan of the proposed temple is engraved by the Sthapati and Sutragrahaṇi with the help of a sharp edged instrument, on the perfectly leveled Piṭha. As temples in every of their details depend on proportions, complex ancient methods are used for correct geometric designing and executing the ground plan (bhunaksa) to ensure long term stability and aesthetic appearance of these huge structures. Simplicity or intricacy of the temple is reflected in this ground plan. Thereafter, the Bardhanikas set about precut stones, under the strict vigilance of Sutragrahaṇi as per the Bhunaksa, Deula Gaddanni has started.

== Deuḷa ==
Temple architecture in Odisha evolved over a long period of time. Stipulated architectural principles with ample provision for artistic improvisation enabled the progressive generations. Temples in Odisha are based on certain fundamental principles of stability and take their cue from the human body. The superstructure is basically divided into three parts, the Bāḍa (Lower Limb), the Ganḍi (Body) and the Cuḷa/Mastaka (Head). Accordingly, each part is given a different treatment throughout, from the architecture to the final ornamentation of the Temple.

Temples in Odisha in the classic local style very often have a figure of Gajalakshami in lalitasana as their lalatabimba or central protective image over the doorway to a temple or the sanctuary of one.

=== Classification ===
Classification of deuḷa temples at Bhubaneswar, Puri and Konark

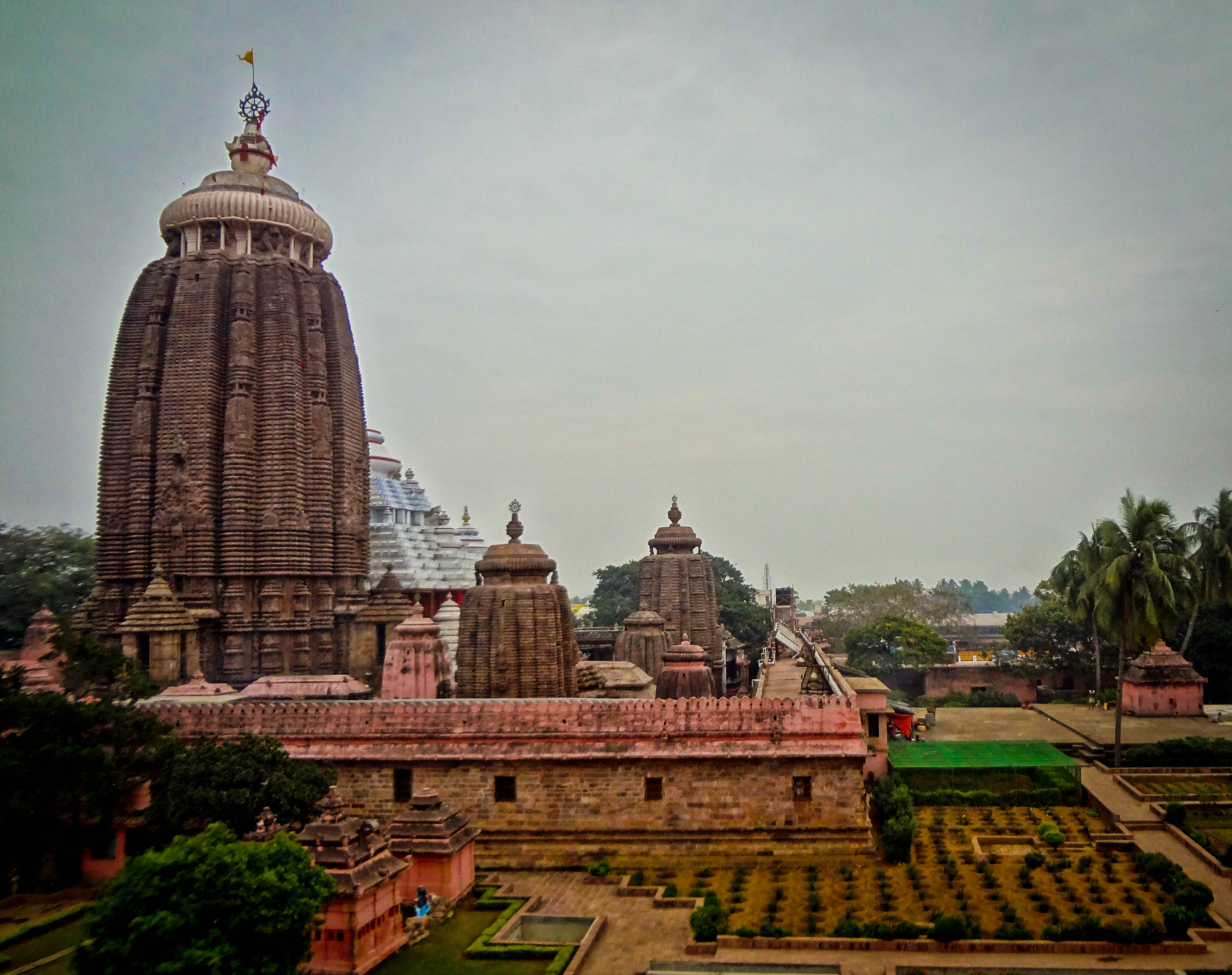
Shri Jagannath Temple, Puri

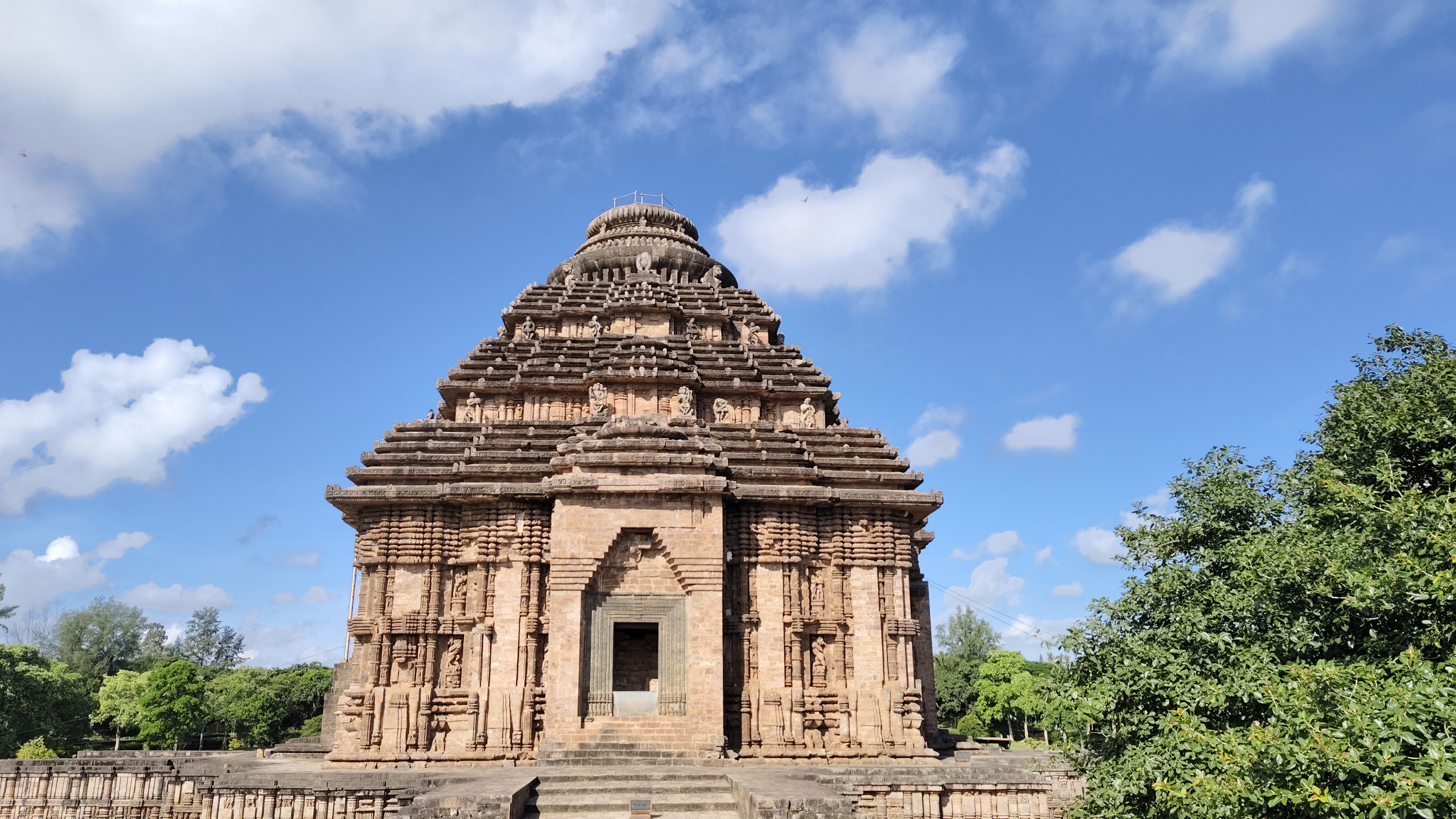
Konark Sun Temple (13th century), a UNESCO World Heritage Site in Odisha; built by Narasimha Deva I of the Eastern Ganga dynasty

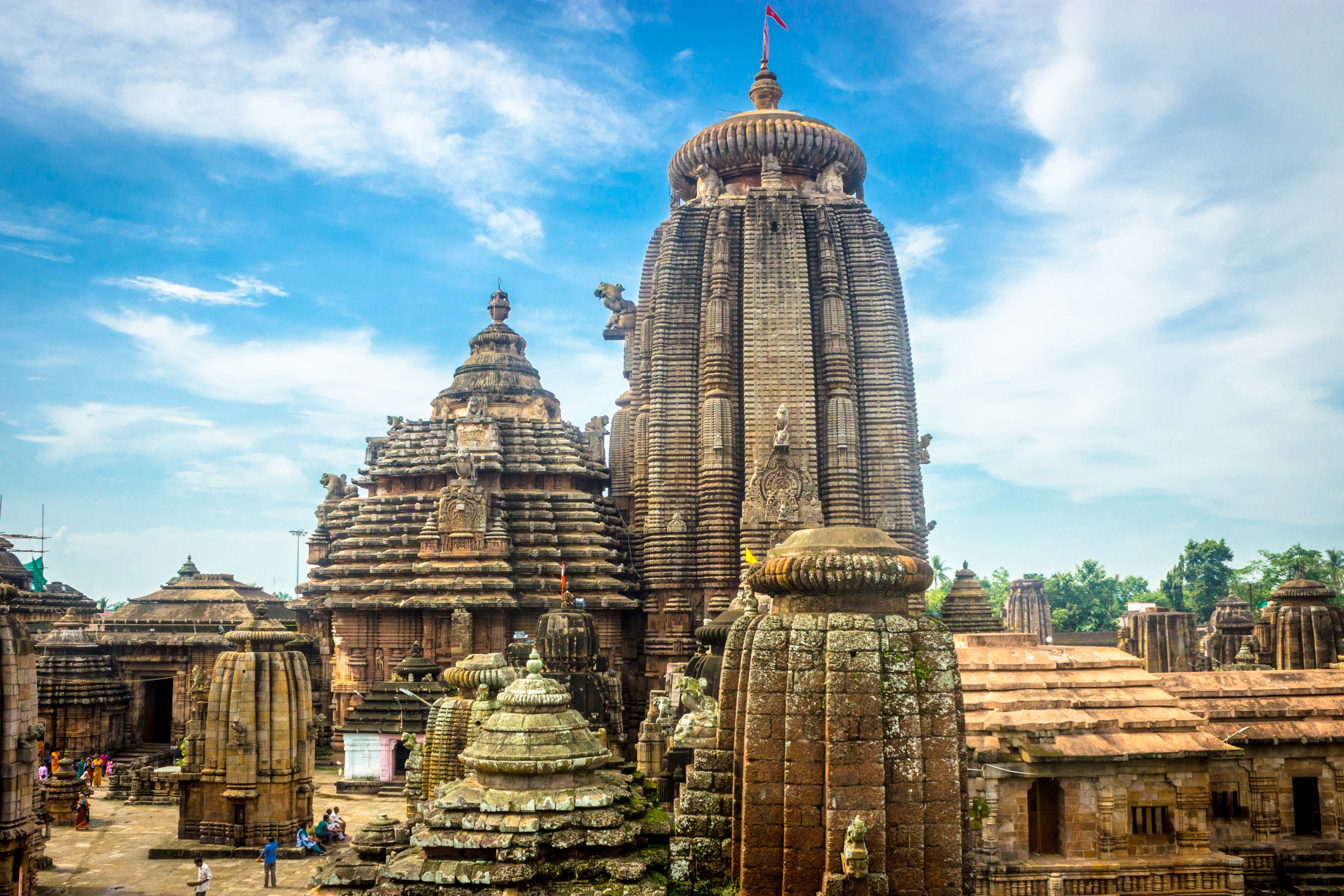
Lingaraja Temple, Bhubaneswar Old Town

Rear view of Baitala Deula, Bhubaneswar

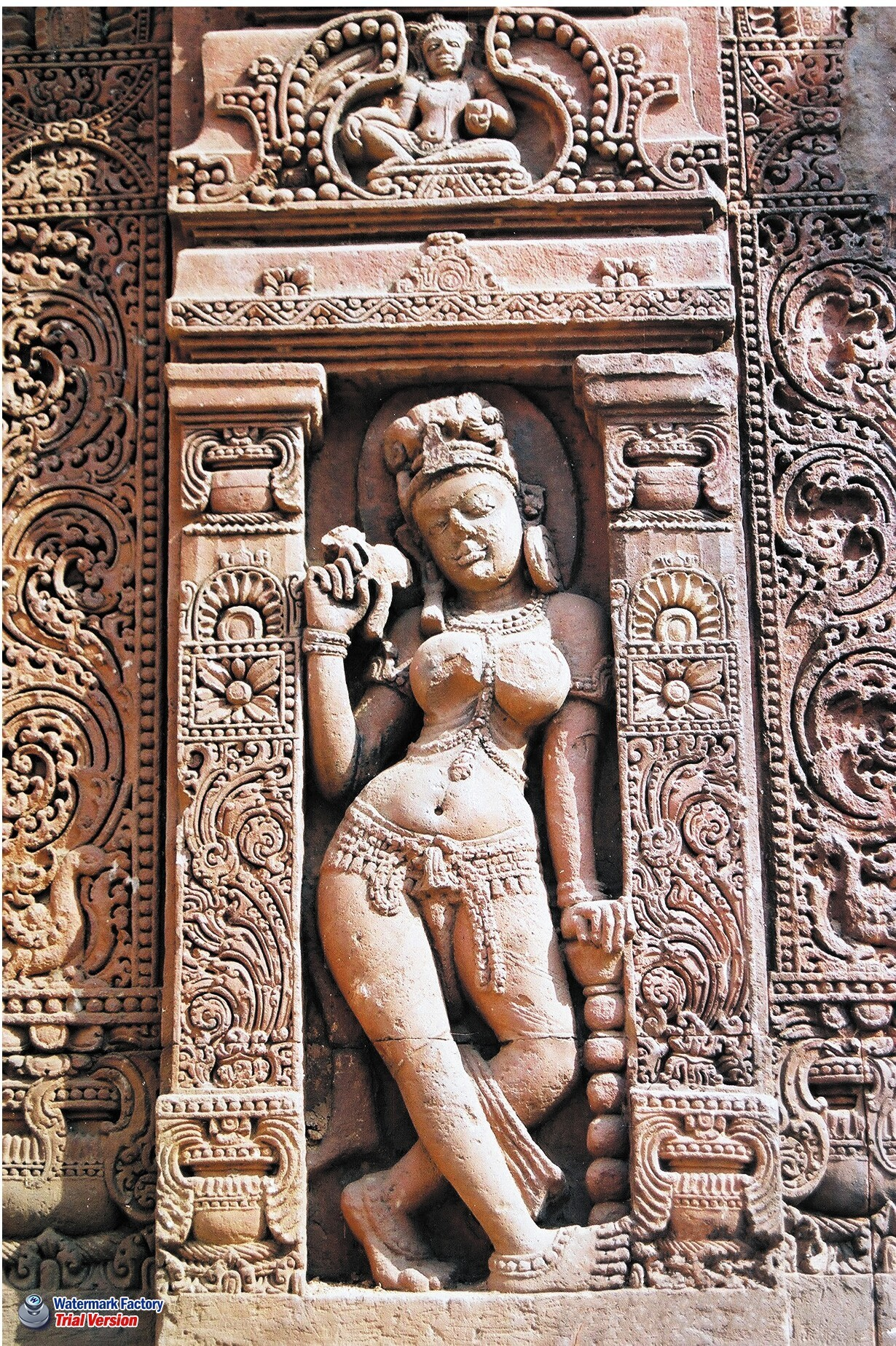
Sculpture of an Alasa Kanya at Baitala Deula, Bhubaneswar

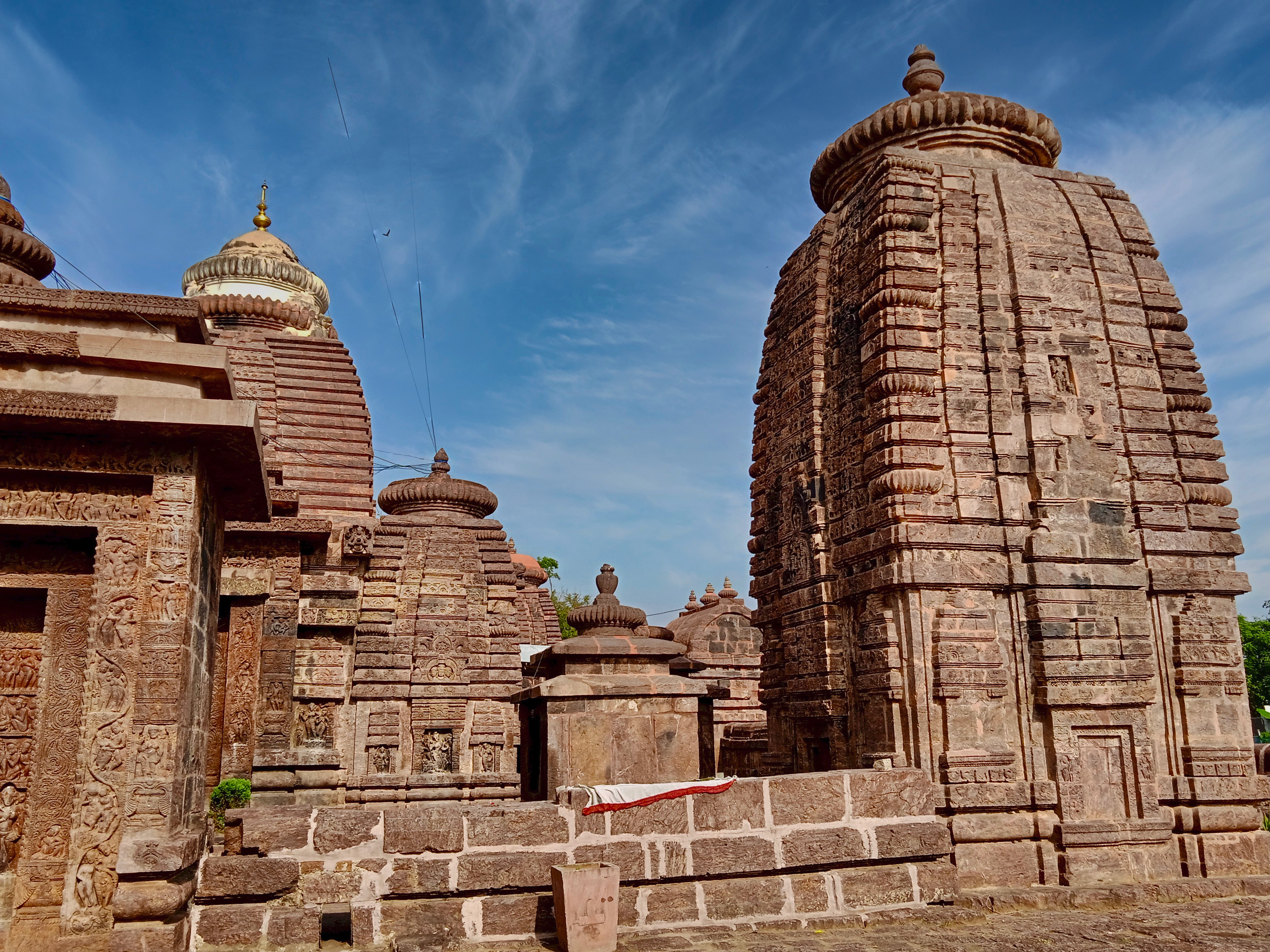
Mukhalingeswara Temples Group (c. 700 CE), Mukhalingam, Andhra Pradesh

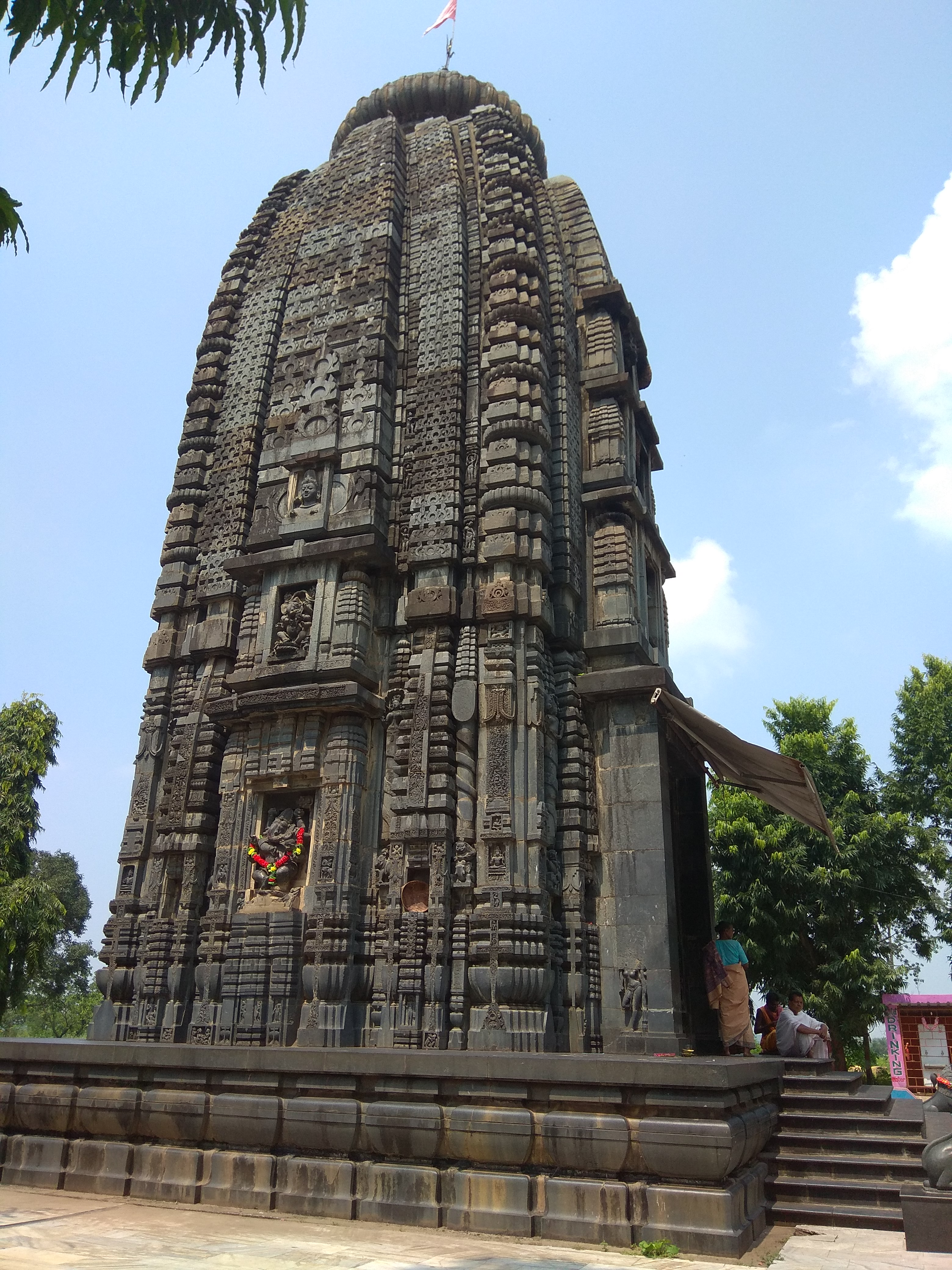
Kichakeswari Temple (c. 700 CE), Khiching, Mayurbhanja, Odisha; notable for rare black stone

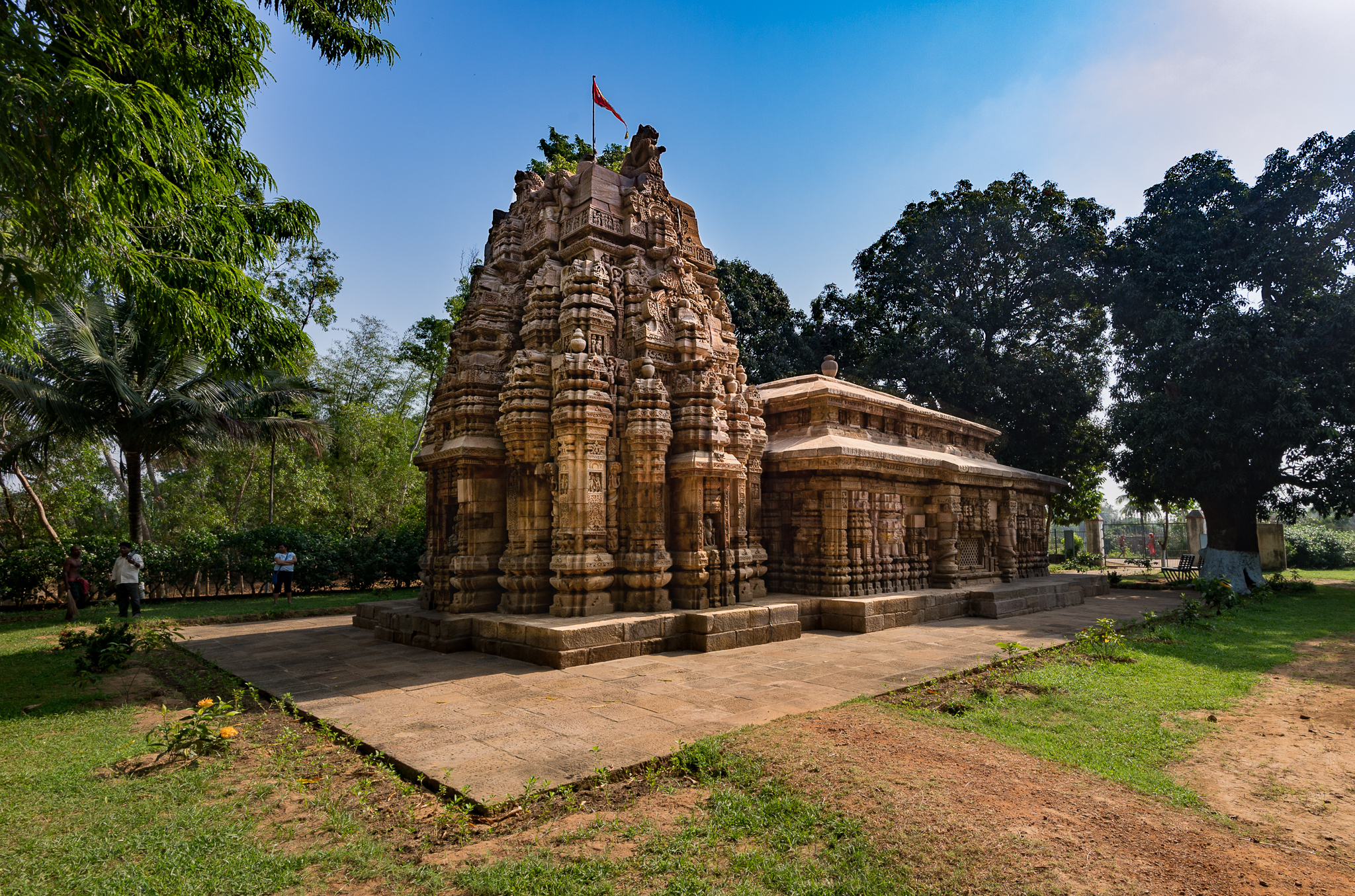
Varahi Devi Temple (a khakhara deuḷa), Chaurasi, Odisha

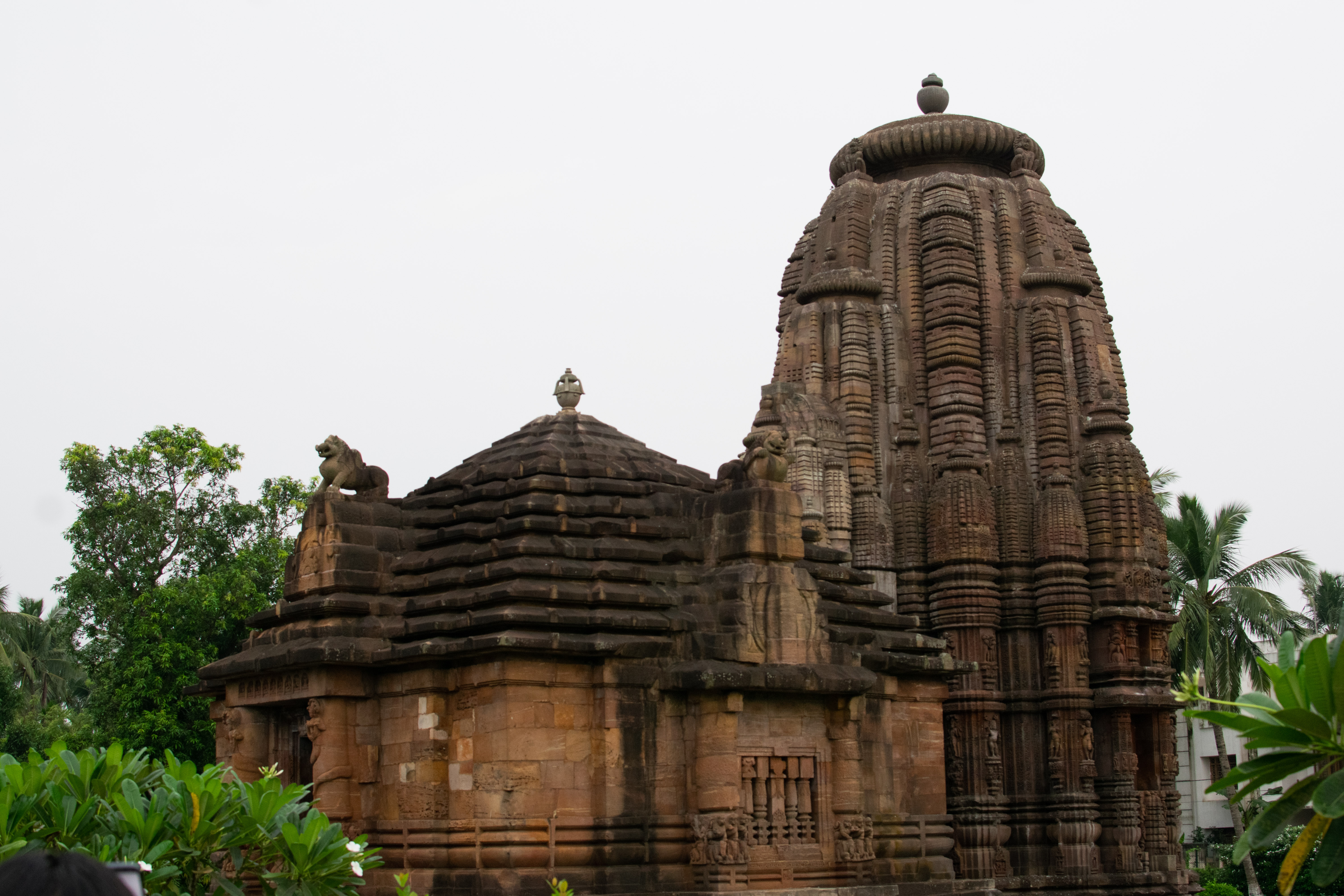
Rajarani Temple, Bhubaneswar

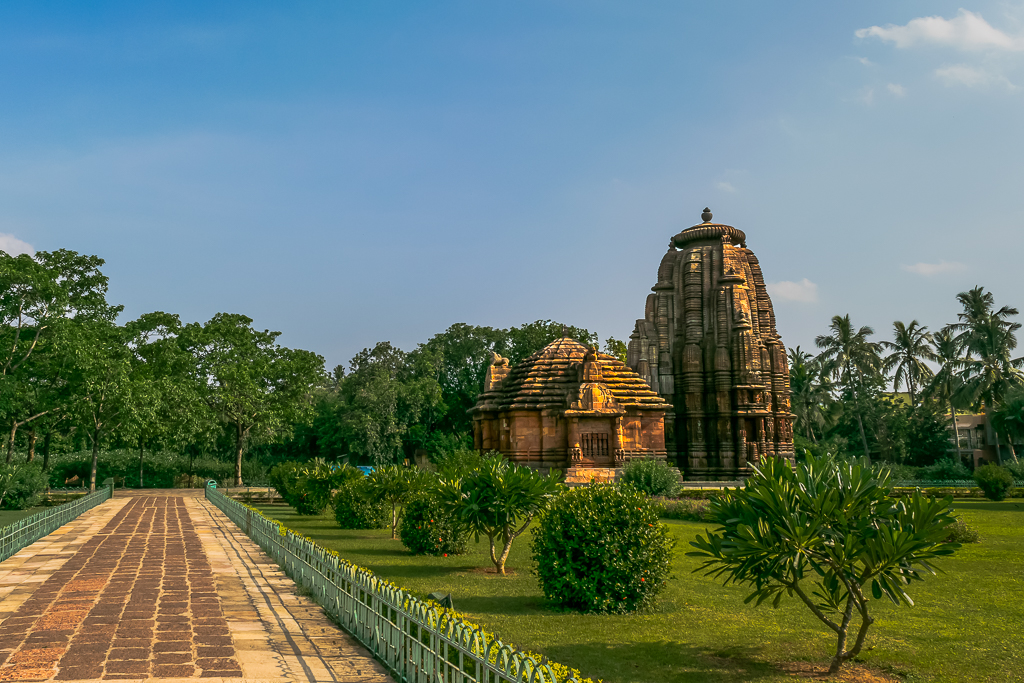
Rajarani Temple, Bhubaneswar (another view)

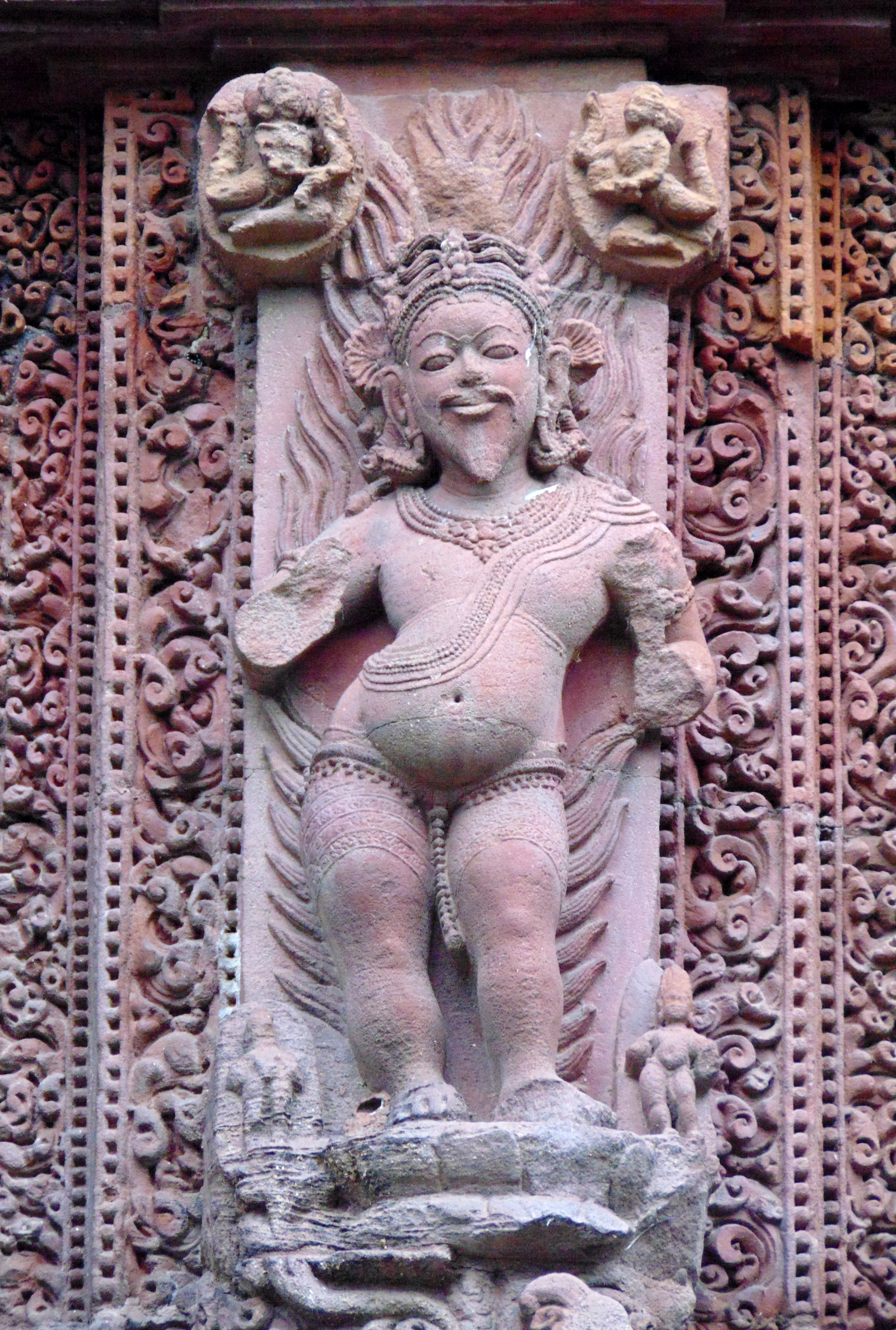
Sculpture at the Rajarani Temple, Bhubaneswar

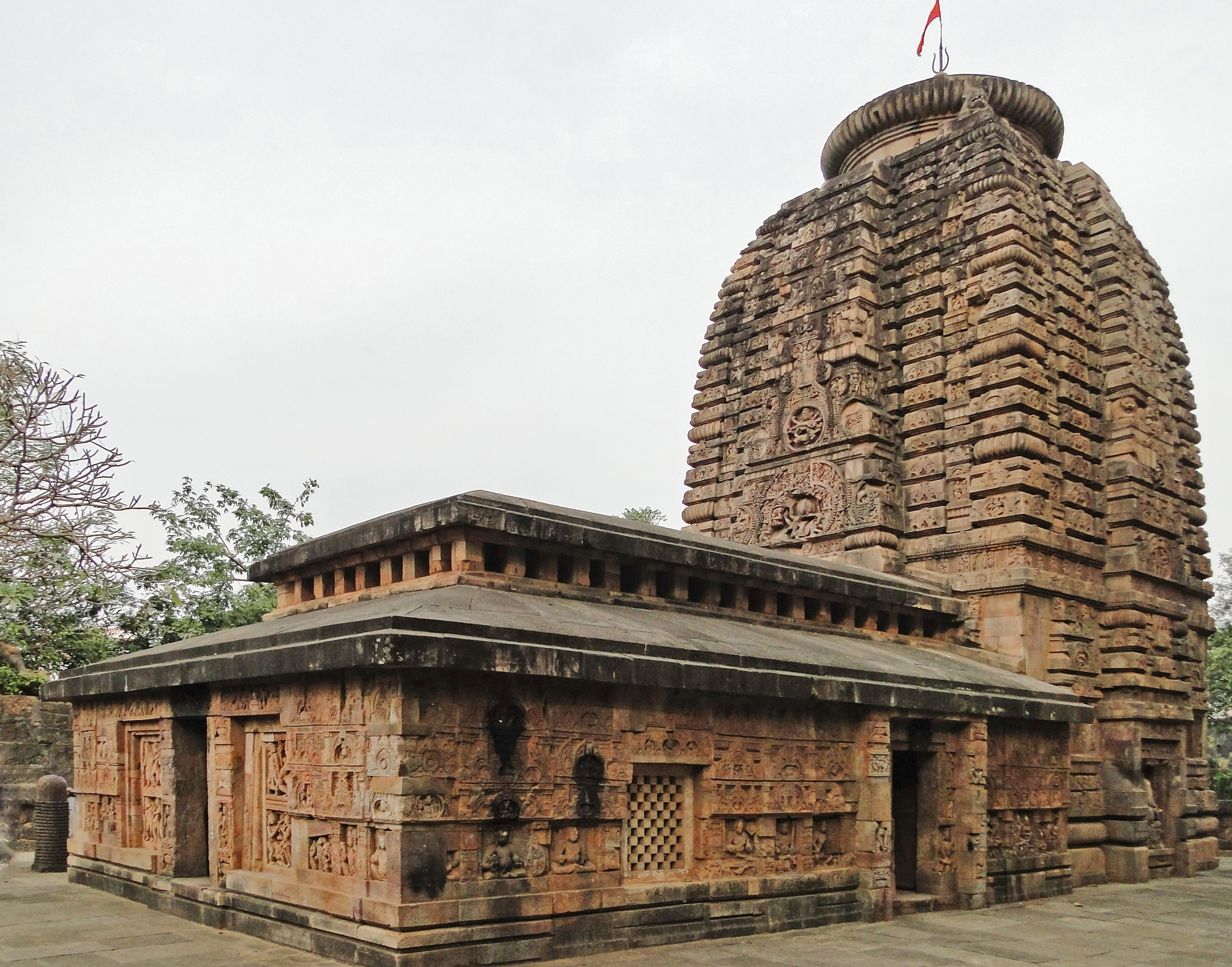
Parasuramesvara Temple (7th century CE), associated with the Shailodbhavas

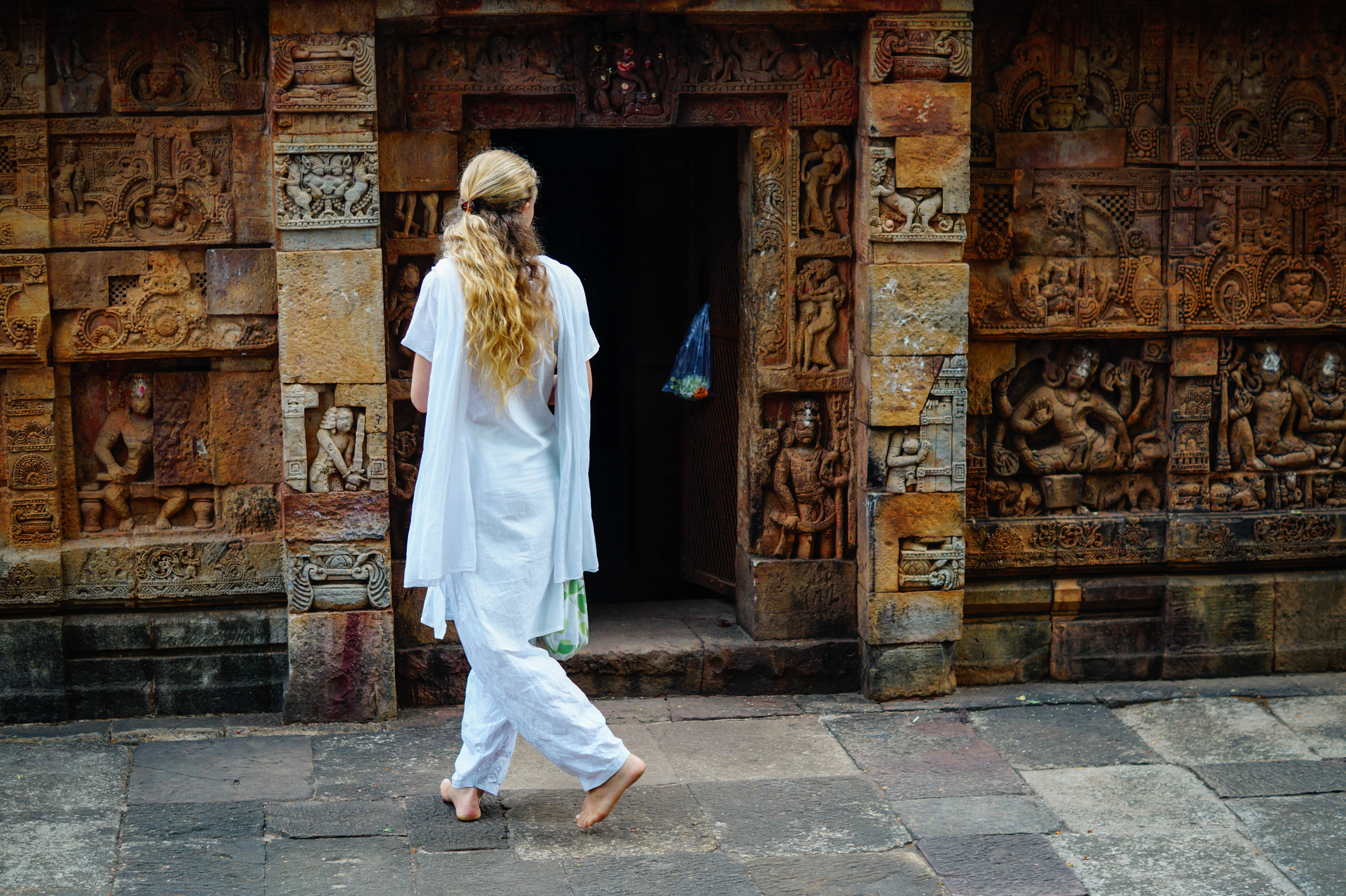
Parasuramesvara Temple, Bhubaneswar Old Town

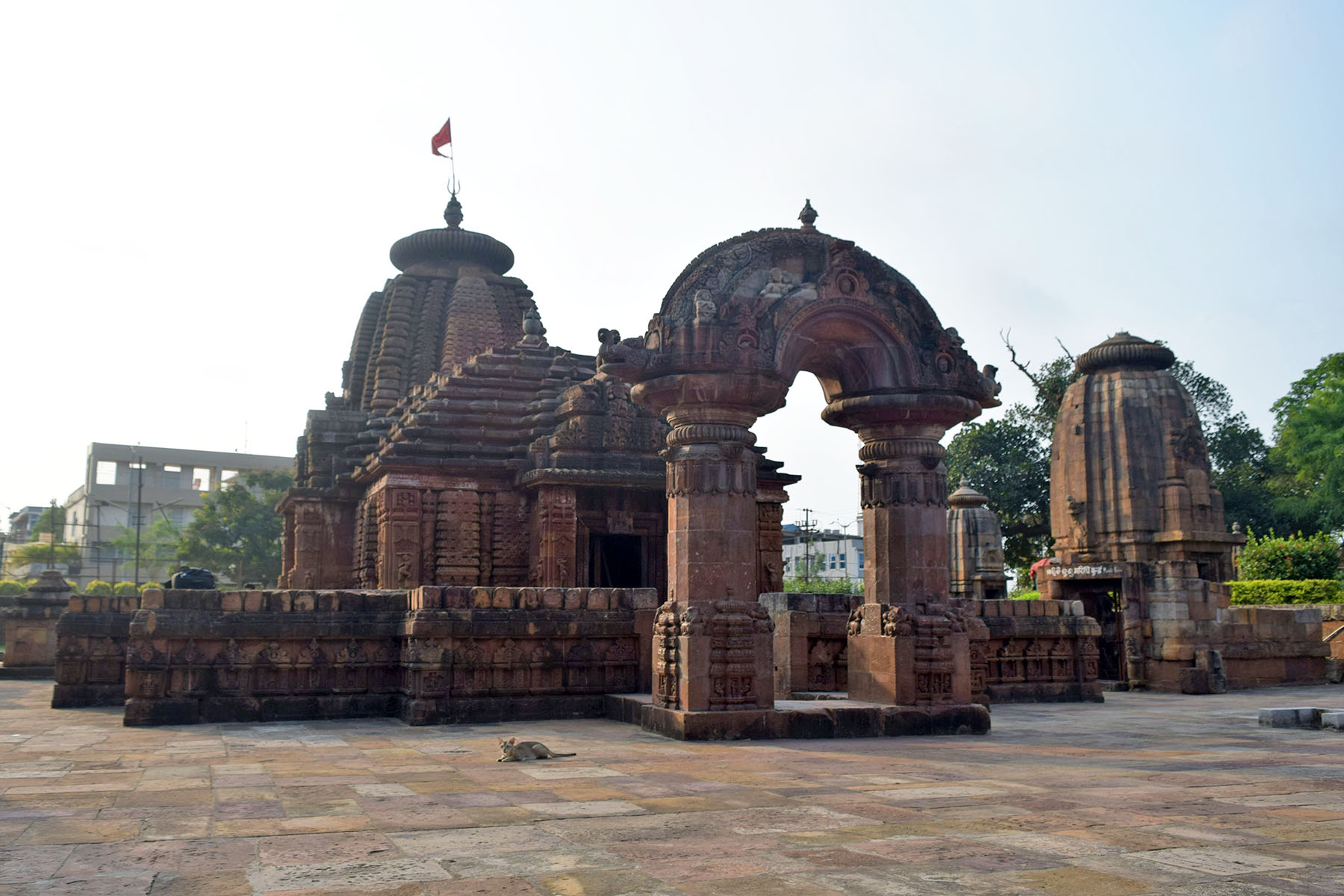
Mukteshvara Temple, Bhubaneswar

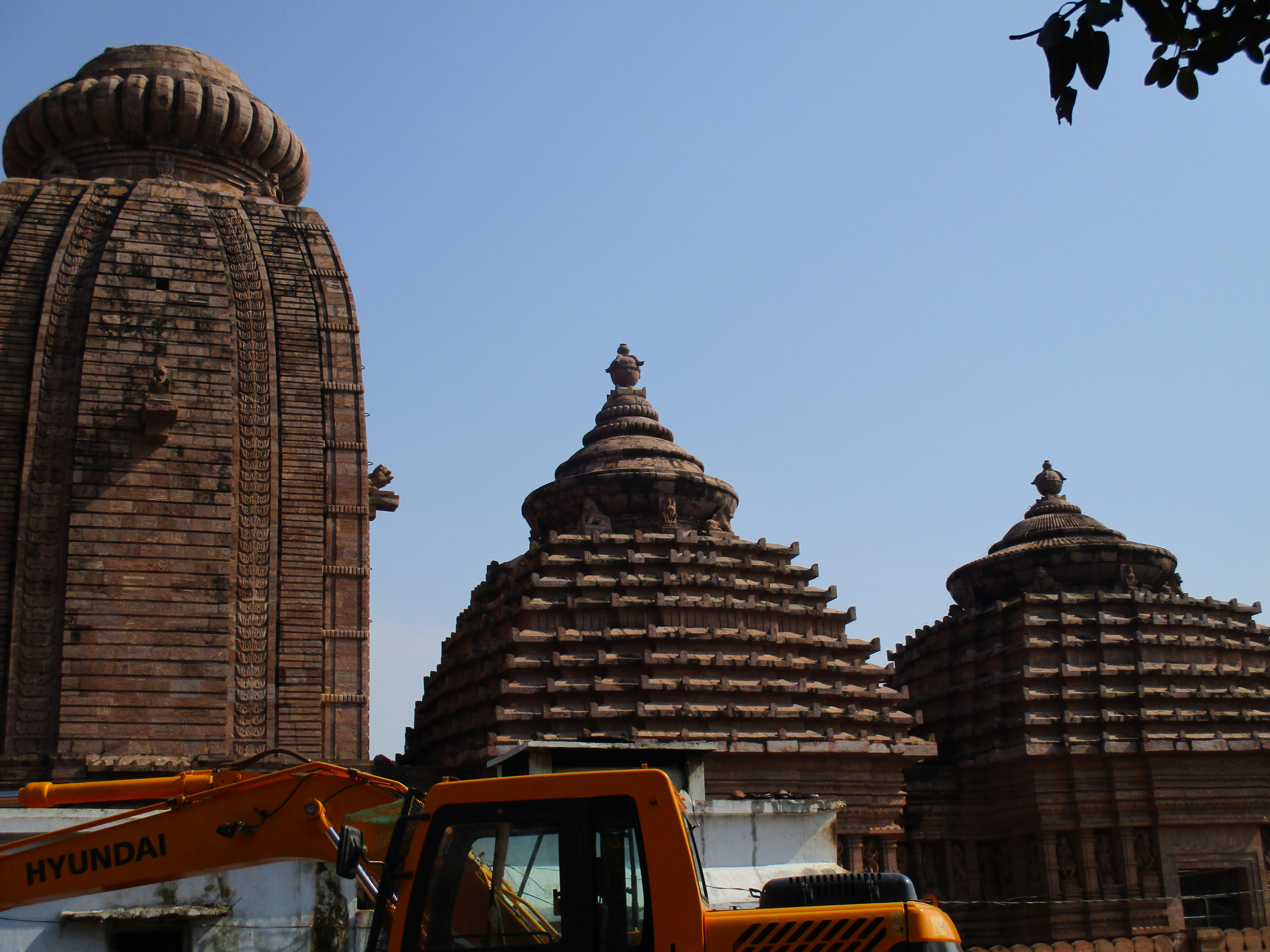
Taratarini Temple, Purushottamapur, Ganjam; a major Shakta pitha site

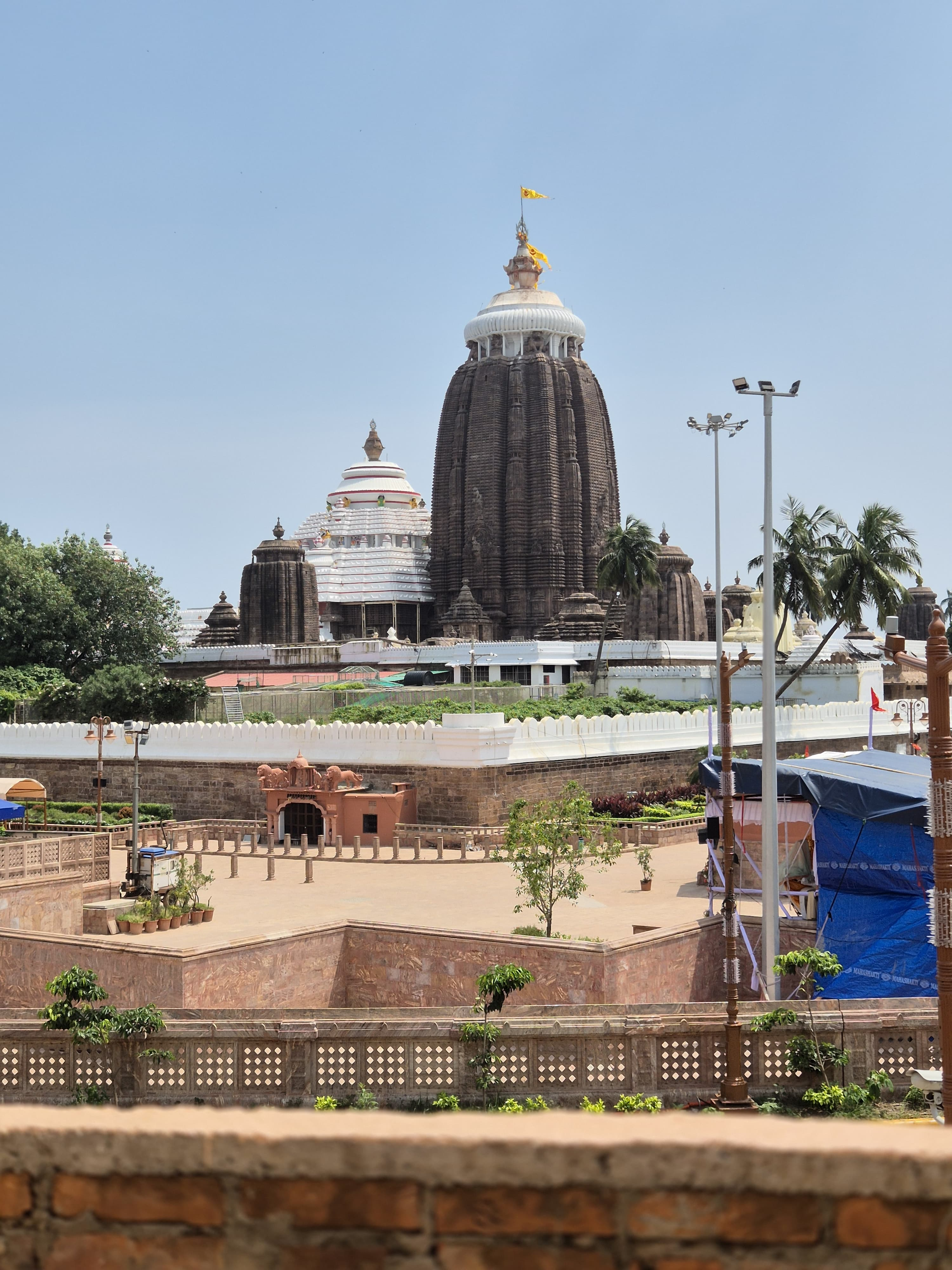
Shri Jagannath Temple, Puri, Odisha
- Rekhā deuḷa
  - Types:
    - Lokanatha Siva Temple
    - Padma Garbha
    - Ratha Yukta
    - Meru Shaili
  - Examples:
    - Lingaraja Temple (Bhubaneswar)
    - Jagannath Temple (Puri)
- Piḍha deuḷa
  - Types:
    - Dwichallia Piḍha
    - Nahachallia Piḍha
    - Kathachalia Piḍha
    - Ghantashree Mohana
    - Piḍha Mohana
    - Naddu Mohana
  - Example:
    - Konark Temple (Konark)
- Baitaḷa / Khakhara deuḷa
  - Example:
    - Baitala Deula (Bhubaneswar)
- Other examples
  - Varahi Deula, Chaurasi
  - Durga Temple, Baideshwar
