= List of neighbourhoods in Bhubaneswar =

Bhubaneswar is the capital of the Indian state of Odisha. The city has a long history of over 2000 years starting with Chhedi dynasty (around 2nd century BCE) who had Sisupalagarh near present-day Bhubaneswar as their capital. Historically Bhubaneswar has been known by different names such as Toshali, Kalinga Nagari, Nagara Kalinga, Ekamra Kanana, Ekamra Khetra and Mandira Malini Nagari (City of Temples) otherwise known as the Cathedral City of India. Bhubaneswar, literally means the Lord (Eeswar) of the Universe (Bhuban). It is the largest city of Odisha, and a center of economic & religious importance in the region today.

Bhubaneswar's proud possession of magnificent sculptures and architectural heritage, coupled with the sanctity as Ekamrakhetra make this one of the great religious centres of Orissa since early medieval days. With its large number of Hindu temples (over 600 in number), which span the entire spectrum of Kalinga architecture, Bhubaneswar is often referred to as a Temple City of India and together with Puri and Konark it forms the Subarna Tribhuja (Golden Triangle); one of the most visited destinations in East India.

The modern city of Bhubaneswar was designed by the German architect Otto Königsberger in 1966. Like Jamshedpur, Chandigarh, it is one of the first planned cities of modern India. With the Chandaka reserve forest on the fringes, the city with an abundance of in-city greenery and an efficient civic body (the BMC- Bhubaneswar Municipal Corporation), is one of the cleanest and greenest cities of India.

Bhubaneswar replaced Cuttack as the political capital of the state of Orissa in 1968, 21 years after India gained its independence from Britain. Bhubaneswar and Cuttack are often commonly together known as the twin-cities of Orissa. The metropolitan area formed by the twin cities has a 2011 population of 1.4 million. Bhubaneswar is categorized as a Tier-2 city. An emerging Information Technology (IT) hub, the boom in the metals and metal processing industries have made Bhubaneswar one of the fastest developing cities of India in recent years.

The city of Bhubaneswar can be broadly divided into following parts- the old town area, the planned city, the added areas and the Greater Bhubaneswar area. The neighbourhoods in Bhubaneswar can also be divided according to the geographical location of the place.

== North Bhubaneswar ==
The northern Bhubaneswar roughly constitute the areas lying north of National Highway 5 till Patia. Patia, Chandrasekharpur, Mancheswar, were villages surrounded by forests and farms, outside Bhubaneswar. These areas have developed a few years ago and recently merged with Bhubaneswar and not the part of the original master plan of the city made in 1968.

- Chandrasekharpur
  - Damana
  - Infocity
  - Sailashree Vihar
  - Niladri Vihar
  - Rail Vihar
  - Nalco Nagar
  - Gajapati Nagar
- Vani Vihar
- Salia Sahi
- Jayadev Vihar
- IRC Village
- Patia

== Central Bhubaneswar ==
- A G Colony
- Acharya Vihar
- Ashok Nagar (Unit-2)
- Bapuji Nagar (Unit-1)
- Bhouma Nagar (Unit-4)
- Bhoi Nagar (Unit-9)
- Ekamra Vihar
- Forest Park
- Ganga Nagar (Unit-6)
- Keshari Nagar (Unit-5)
- Kharvela Nagar (Unit-3)
- Madhusudan Nagar
- Master Canteen
- Nayapalli
- Saheed Nagar
- Satya Nagar
- Surya Nagar (Unit-7)
- Unit - 8

These areas were part of the 1968 masterplan, except Saheed Nagar & Satya Nagar, that were farms but later merged with the town.

== South Bhubaneswar ==
- Samantarapur
- BJB Nagar
- Rajarani Colony
- Pandab Nagar
- Brahmeswar Haat
- Gouri Nagar
- Bhimatangi
- Kapileswar
- Old Town

It is the original historical Bhubaneswar. All, except the BJB Nagar were villages.

== Western Bhubaneswar ==
A relatively new part of Bhubaneswar constituting both planned, unplanned colonies and Villages. The western fringe areas are growing due to some reasons such as establishment of educational institutions.

- Baramunda
- Gopabandhu Nagar
- Delta Colony
- Soubhagya Nagar
- CRPF
- Jagamara
- Khandagiri

=== Fringes ===
- Pokhariput
- Palasapalli
- Patrapada
- Bhimatangi
- Kalinga Nagar

== Eastern Bhubaneswar ==
- Mancheswar
- VSS Nagar
- Rasulgarh
- Palasuni
- Jharpada
- Laxmisagar
  - Chintamanishwar
  - BJB Nagar
  - Canal Road
