= Saheed Nagar =

Neighbourhood in Bhubaneswar, Odisha

Coordinates: 20.292724°N 85.845962°E

Saheed Nagar WNS or Sahid Nagar is a neighbourhood and major commercial area in Bhubaneswar, Odisha. Originally planned as an upscale residential area, Saheed Nagar is now primarily known as a high-street commercial area along Janpath. Saheed Nagar is one of the best developed posh locality of Bhubaneswar. This is the 10th Unit of Bhubaneswar after all nine units originally planned when the new Bhubaneswar Town / city was planned in the year 1950.

Saheed Nagar was designed and planned by the General Administration Department of Government of Odisha around 1960 and majority of the plots herein were private plots. Saheed Nagar starts immediately after Satya Nagar and stretched up to National Highway 5 i.e. Vani Vihar Chhak. Saheed Nagar is located not less than a square kilometer. It has a local Railway station called Vani Vihar Railway Station. It adjoins Rasulgarh and Mancheswar Industrial Area. It is located adjacent to the Utkal University Campus. It is located between the East Coast Railway Line in East, Janpath on West, National Highway in North and Satya Nagar in South.
