= Sri Sri Nilakantheswar Temple =

- Location in Odisha

Religion
- Affiliation: Hinduism
- District: Khordha
- Deity: Shiva

Location
- Location: Bhubaneswar
- State: Odisha
- Country: India
- Coordinates: 20.233711°N 85.819132°E

Architecture
- Type: Kalingan Style (Kalinga Architecture)
- Completed: 20th century A.D.

Sri Sri Nilakantheswar Temple is a Hindu temple located in the neighbourhood of Bhimatangi, in western Bhubaneswar, India. The temple faces west, and its enshrining deity is a Shiva lingam within a circular yoni made of laterite.

== See also ==
- List of temples in Bhubaneswar
