= List of parks in Bhubaneswar =

The below is a list of parks in Bhubaneswar. Many of them are maintained by the Bhubaneswar Development Authority:

- Biju Patanaik Park (formerly Forest Park)
- Budha Jayanti Park
- Ekamra Kanan (Cactus Garden)
- Forest Park
- Mahatma Gandhi Park
- Indira Gandhi Park

Indira Gandhi Park was erected at the site where Late Mrs. Indira Gandhi had delivered her last public speech on 30 October 1984. After returning from the destination, she was shot dead by her own bodyguards. Located in front of Orissa Secretariat and State Assembly, the park is spread over an area of 10.6 acres. Once the parade ground of the city, the park is decorated with flower gardens and fountains. In the park, tourists can view a statue of Late Mrs. Indira Gandhi that was designed and sculptured by Russian sculptors Mr. Dimitry Ryebachev and Alexander Ryebachev. The park is a favourite for strolling, relaxation and walking. In the morning, many locals can be seen jogging within the park.

- IMFA Park
- Kharavela Park
- Shyama Prasad Mukherjee Park
- Subas Bose Park
- Nandankanan Zoological Park
- City center park (formerly BDA Nicco Park)
- Science Park
- Nehru Park
- Dhauli Peace Park (ongoing project)
