= Roads in Bhubaneswar =

Bhubaneswar Highway

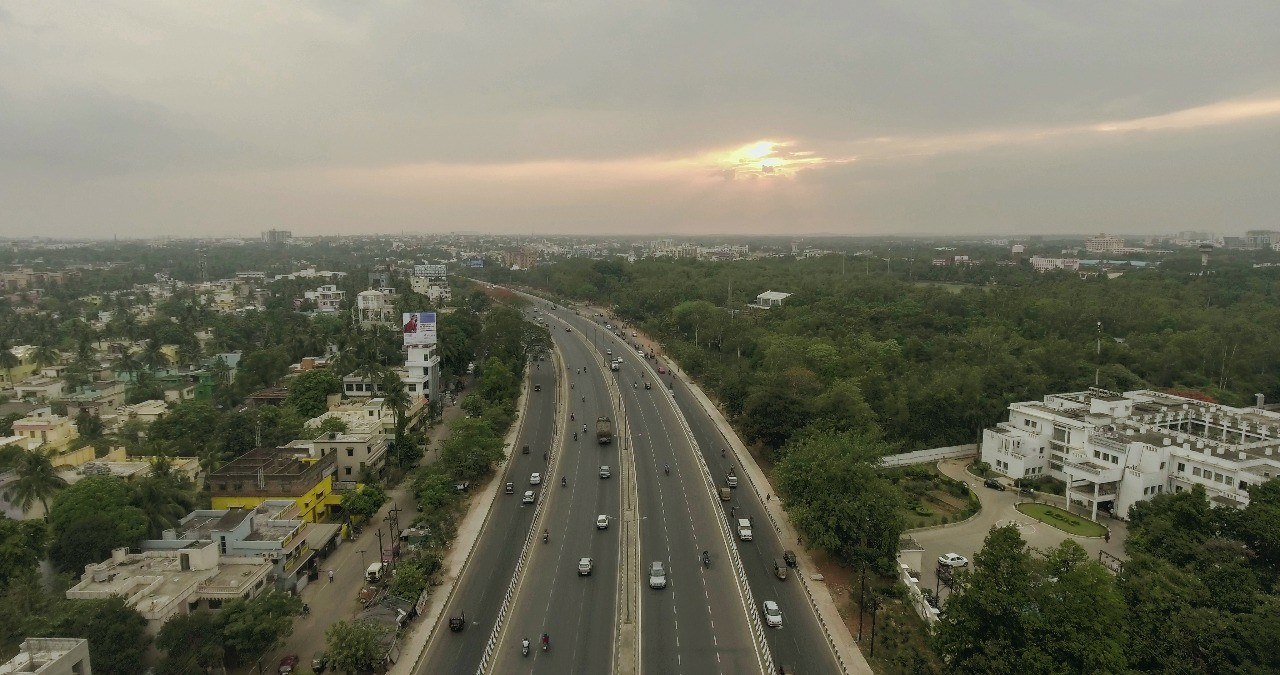
Aerial view of a flyover, Bhubaneswar.

The Indian metropolis of Bhubaneswar has approximately 1,600 kilometres (990 mi) of roads, with average road density of 11.82 square kilometres (4.56 sq mi). Baramunda Inter State Bus Terminus (ISBT) is the major bus terminus in the city from where buses ply to all the districts in Odisha as well as to neighbouring state's cities like Hyderabad, Kolkata, Visakhapatnam, Raipur and Ranchi. City bus service runs in public-private partnership between Bhubaneswar-Puri Transport Service Limited (BPTSL) and Dream Team Sahara (DTS) under JNNURM scheme. A fleet of 185 buses cover all major destinations including Cuttack, Puri and Khordha. Auto rickshaws are available for hire and on a share basis throughout the city. In parts of the city, cycle rickshaws offer short trips. To ease traffic jams, over-bridges at major road junctions and expansion of roads are under construction. In a study of six cities in India, Bhubaneswar was ranked third concerning pedestrian infrastructure. The city scored 50 points out of maximum 100. The government of Odisha introduced the much-awaited Bhubaneswar BRTS (bus rapid transit) in Bhubaneswar.

== Rajpath ==
Rajpath is a major east-west thoroughfare in Bhubaneswar, Odisha, India. Rajpath starts from Kalpana Square crossing with NH 203 and ends at Raj Bhawan Chak, crossing with Bidyut Marg and Gopabandu-Governor House Road. It has important crossing with Janpath and Sachivalaya Marg. A flyover over Rajmahal crossing was opened in 2012 to reduce traffic congestion. The stretch from Rajmahal to Kalpana Square has numerous budget Hotels to suit different tourists and travelers.

=== Landmarks ===
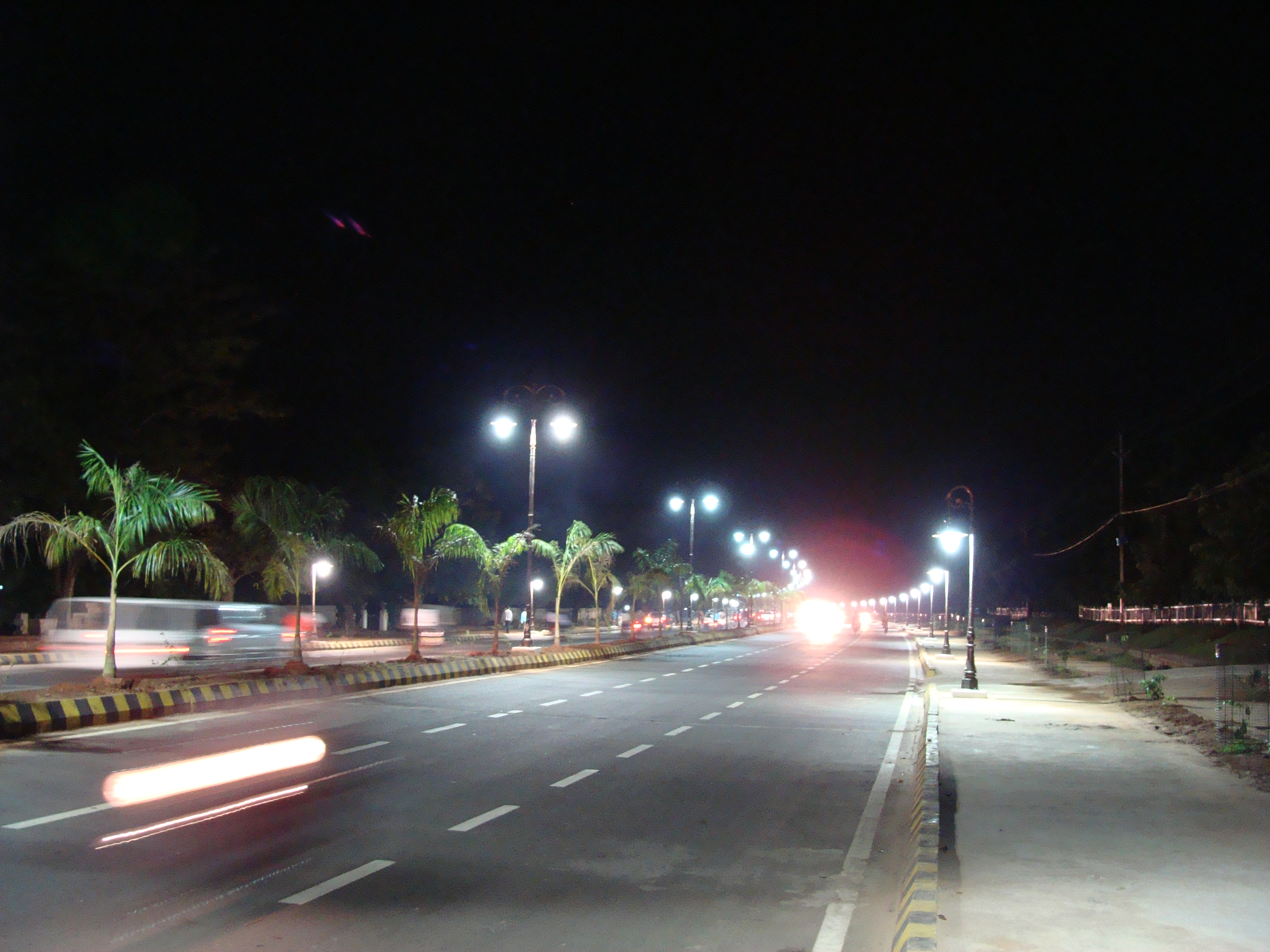
Rajpath at night

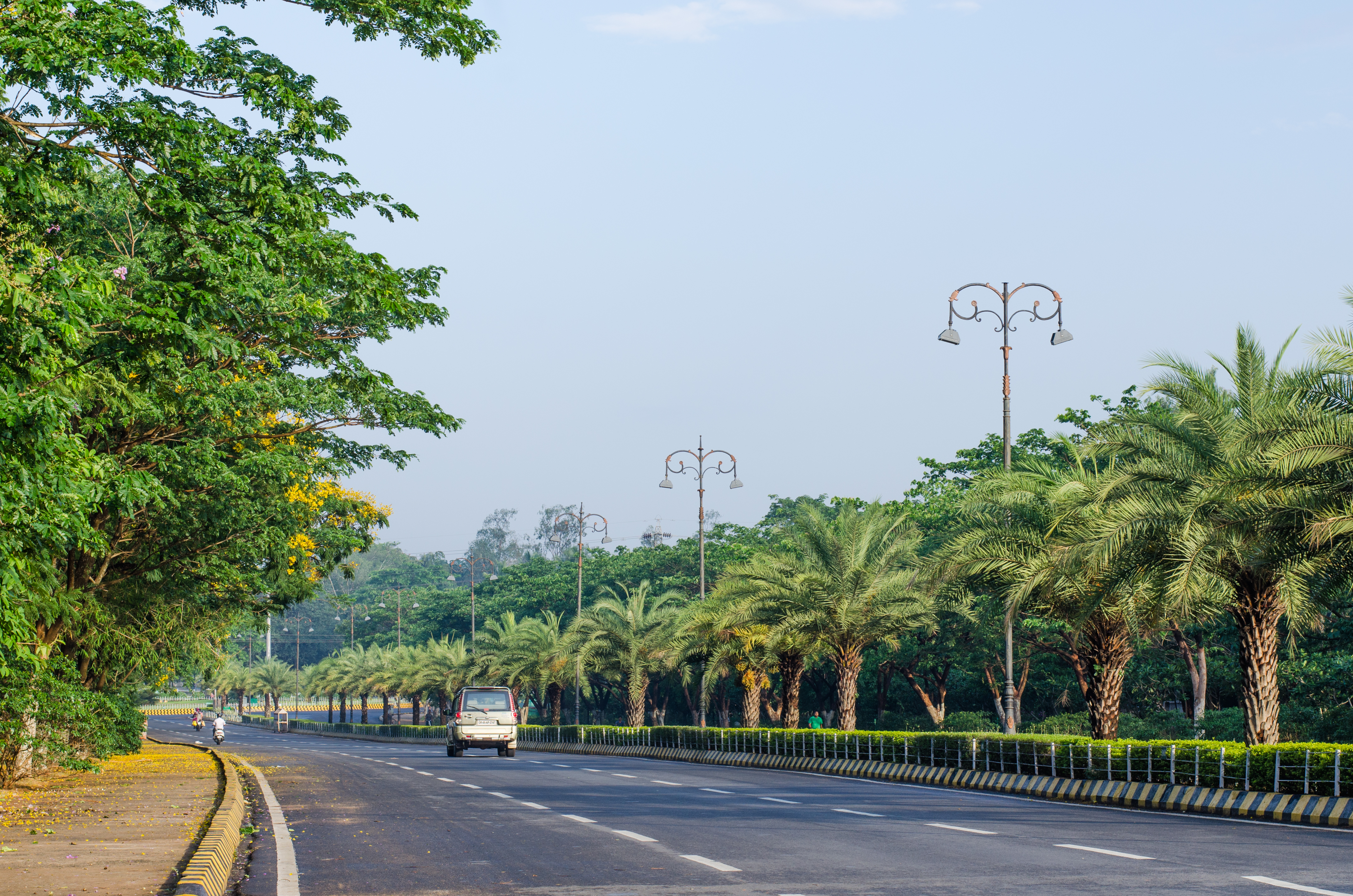
Rajpath, early morning

- Capital Police Station
- Raj Bhavan

== Sachivalaya Marg ==
Sachivalaya Marg is a major North-South thoroughfare in Bhubaneswar, Odisha. Sachivalaya Marg starts from AG Square, crossing with Rajpath, Bhubaneswar and ends at Kalinga Hospital Square, in Chandrasekharpur. It has important crossing with NH 5. The road has many important offices and educational institutions. The southern part of the road continues as Hospital Road, extending into the New Terminal of Bhubaneswar Airport. In 2012-2013, the stretch from Sainik School to Acharya Vihar Square was beautified with sculptures and plantations.

=== Landmarks ===
- Indira Gandhi Park
- Odisha State Secretariat
- Odisha Legislative Assembly
- Head Post Office
- Rabindra Mandap, a prominent cultural center
- State Bank of India head office
- Reserve Bank of India regional office
- National Informatics Center
- State Library
- State Archives
- Regional Institute of Education
- Demonstration Multipurpose School
- Science Park
- Pathani Samanta Planetarium
- Regional Museum of Natural History, Bhubaneswar
- Utkal University
- Institute of Physics, Bhubaneswar
- Institute of Mineral Sciences
- Apollo Hospital

Bus-routes on the road are 225 KIIT University Campus- Kalpana, 306 KIIT University Campus - Balakati Bazaar, and 324 Bidanasi Village - Master Canteen.

== Janpath ==
Janpath is a major north-south thoroughfare in Bhubaneswar, Odisha. Janpath starts from Vani Vihar crossing with NH5 and ends at Sishu Vihar Square. It passes through localities like Saheed Nagar, Satya Nagar, Kharvel Nagar, Ashok Nagar, Bapuji Nagar. The road was widened to 8 lanes, with led-street lighting in 2012. The road is a hub for retailers and hotels. There is plan to construct foot over bridges over Janpath near RD College and Master Canteen square for road safety of pedestrians.

=== Landmarks ===
- Rajmahal Flyover
- IIPM
- Rama Devi Women's University
- IPCOL - IDCO Tower Building
- Kendriya Vidyalaya No. 1, Bhubaneswar
- Ram Mandir, Bhubaneswar
- Bhubaneswar railway station
- Master Canteen Square
- INOX Bhubaneswar, Forum Mall, S-Complex, Market Building Area off Janpath

== Bidyut Marg ==
Bidyut Marg is a major north-south thoroughfare in Bhubaneswar, Odisha. Bidyut Marg starts from Raj Bhawan Chak, crossing with Rajpath and Gopabandu-Governor House Road and ends at Jayadev Vihar crossing with NH 5. The northern part of the road continues as Nandan Kanan Road beyond Jayadev Vihar. It has important crossing with Gopabandhu Marg, Patel Marg and Sachivalaya Marg and Baya Baba Matha Road. The road was widened to four lanes with median and street beautification in 2007-2008.

=== Landmarks ===
- Raj Bhavan (Odisha)
- Police Commissionerate Building
- 120 Infantry Battalion
- The World Mall
- Kalinga Stadium

== Ekamra Marg ==
Ekamra Marg is a major thoroughfare in Bhubaneswar, Odisha. Ekamra Marg stretches from OUAT, crossing with New Airport Road and Hospital Road, Bhubaneswar and ends at Pallaspalli, near the Old Town. The Biju Patnaik International Airport is the main landmark as it is connected with the New Airport Road. It is one of the most beautiful roads of Bhubaneswar.

=== Landmarks ===
- Biju Patnaik International Airport
- Orissa University of Agriculture and Technology
- Forest Park

=== Bus routes ===
- 207/207A Biju Patnaik International Airport - Nandankanan Zoological Park

== Nandan Kanan Road ==
Nandan Kanan Road is the long continued road of the Bidyut Marg, which is a major thoroughfare in Bhubaneswar, Odisha. It starts from the Jaydev Vihar Interchange and ends in Nandankanan Zoological Park and the road then continues on as Nandankanan — Chandaka Road.

=== Landmarks ===
- Bhubaneswar New railway station
- CARE Hospital
- Chandrasekharpur
- Centre for Environment and Development
- Trident Hotel
- Gandhi Park
- Hotel Ginger
- KIIT University
- The Fortune Towers
- East Coast Railways Headquarters
- Kalinga Institute of Medical Sciences
- Institute of Minerals and Materials Technology (IMMT)
- Xavier Institute of Management Technology (XIMB)

=== Bus routes ===
- 207/207A Airport — Nandankanan
- 225 KIIT University Campus — Kalpana
- 306 KIIT University Campus — Balakati Bazaar
- 315 Hi Tech Hospital Medical College & Hospital - Mayfair Hotel
- 324 Bidanasi Village — Master Canteen
