= Ram Mandir, Bhubaneswar =

Hindu temple in Bhubaneswar, India

Ram Mandir
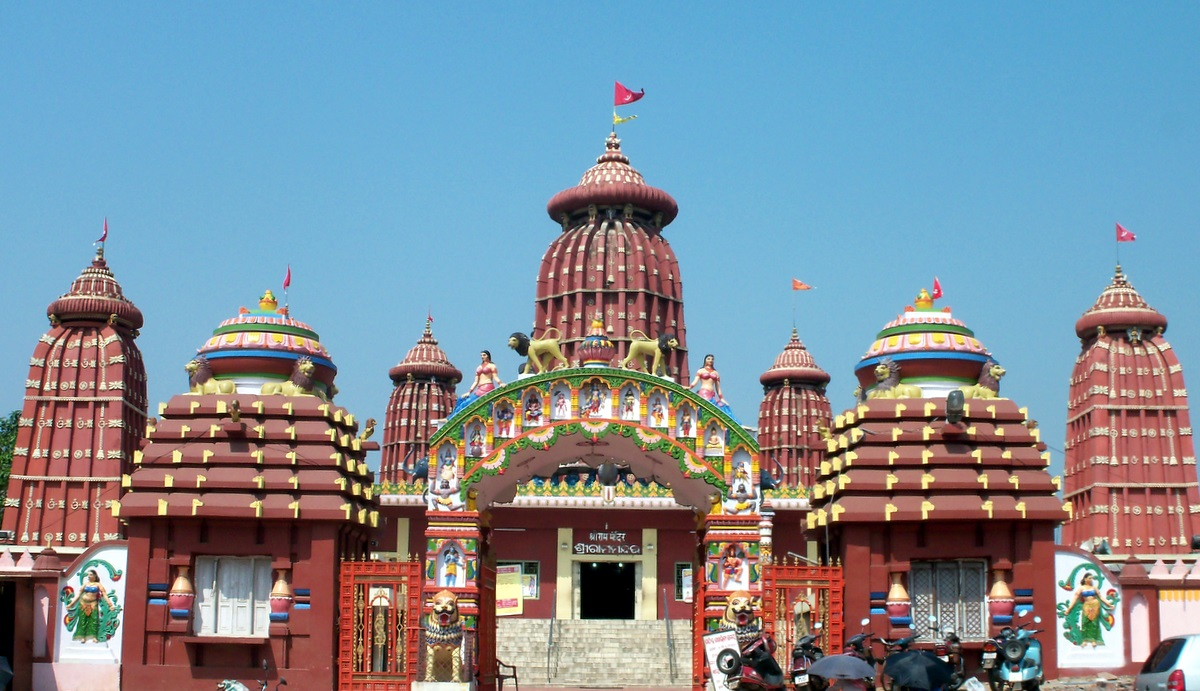

- Location in Odisha Ram Mandir, Bhubaneswar (India)

Religion
- Affiliation: Hinduism
- District: Khordha
- Deity: Rama
- Festivals: Ram Navami, Vivaha Panchami, Janmashtami, Dussehra, Shivaratri, Pana Sankranti

Location
- Location: Bhubaneswar
- State: Odisha
- Country: India
- Interactive map of Ram Mandir
- Coordinates: 20°16′39.54″N 85°50′34.44″E

Ram Mandir (Odia: ରାମ ମନ୍ଦିର) is a Hindu temple, located in Bhubaneswar, near Kharavel Nagar, Janpath, Odisha, India. Ram Mandir is one of the most famous temples of the ‘Temple City of India’ – Bhubaneswar. It houses beautiful images of Lord Rama, his consort Goddess Sita and his brother Lord Lakhshmana.

== About ==
The mandir houses images of the deities Rama, Lakshman and Sita. The high rising iconic spire of the main mandir is the main attraction and can be visible from many parts of the capital city. Built and managed by a private trust, the temple complex also comprises shrines devoted to ochre-painted marble idols of Hanuman, Shiva and other gods.

== Festivals ==
Almost every festival of Hindus are celebrated around the year. Ram Navami, Vivaha Panchami, Janmashtami, Dussehra, Shivaratri, Pana Sankranti are the major ones. The magnificent Aarathi during morning and evening draws a lot of devotees. Annual fair is also organised here on the occasion of Raksha Bandhan or Rakhi.
