= Dayanidhi Choudhury =

Indian forest service officer

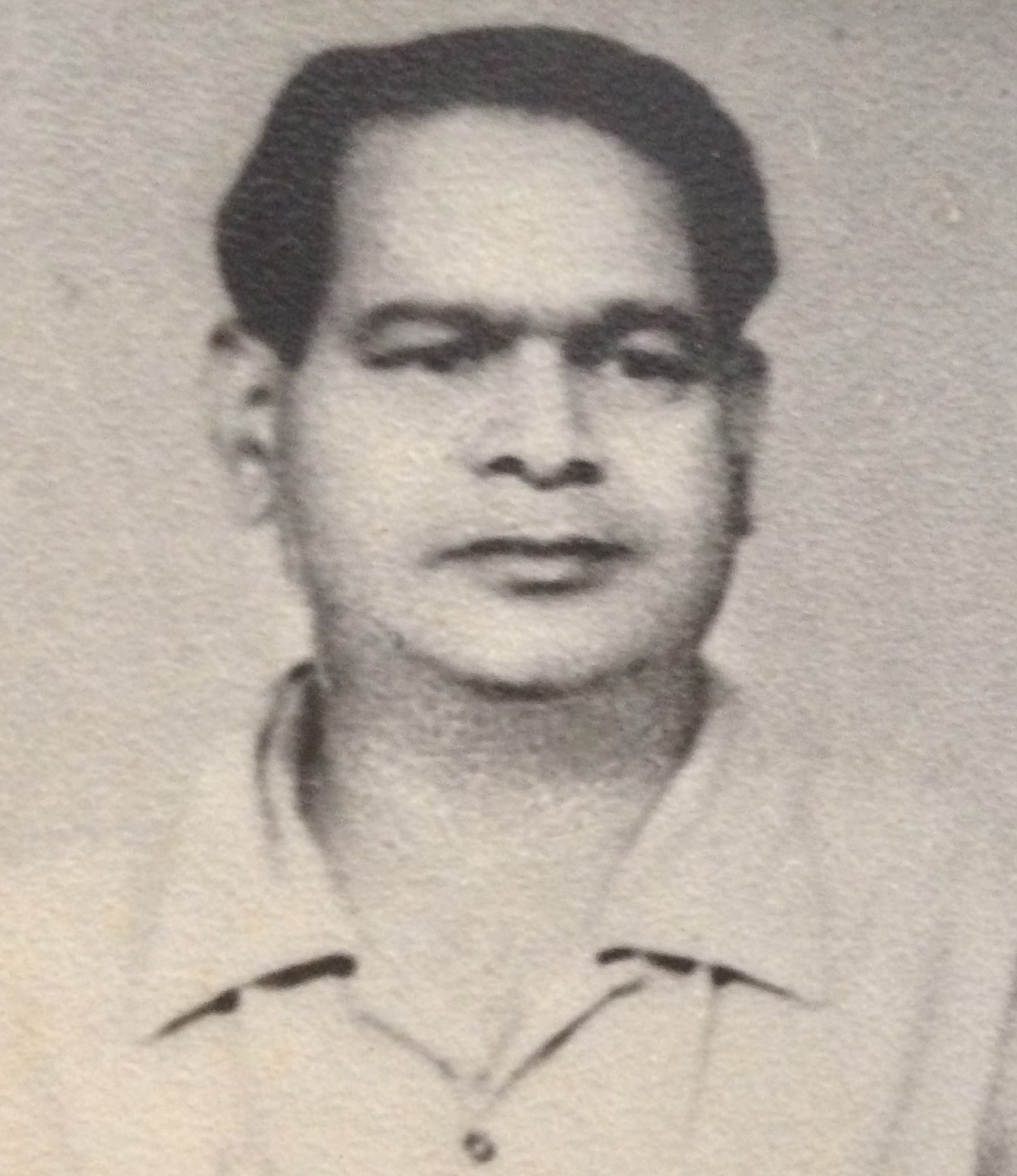
- D.N.Choudhury in 1973
- Born: 1 January 1916; Bihar and Orissa Province, India
- Died: 22 September 2000 (aged 84); Bhubaneswar, Odisha
- Resting place: Swargadwar, Puri
- Other name: D.N. Choudhury
- Occupation: Wildlife conservationist
- Known for: First Odia chief conservator of forest and First Odia IFS.
- Spouse: Suryamani Choudhury
- Children: 2 Sons and 2 Daughters
- Parent: Father: Raghunath Choudhury

Dayanidhi Choudhury, also known as D.N. Choudhury(Odia: ଦୟାନିଧି ଚୌଧୁରୀ)(1 January 1916 – 22 September 2000) was the first Odia IFS (Indian Forest Service) and he is the former Chief Conservator of Forest, Govt. of Odisha. During his period lot of developments happened with respect to forest and wildlife conservation, that includes Nandankanan Zoological Park at Bhubaneswar, Similipal Elephant/Tiger reserve in 1956, which is now a prominent National Park in India.

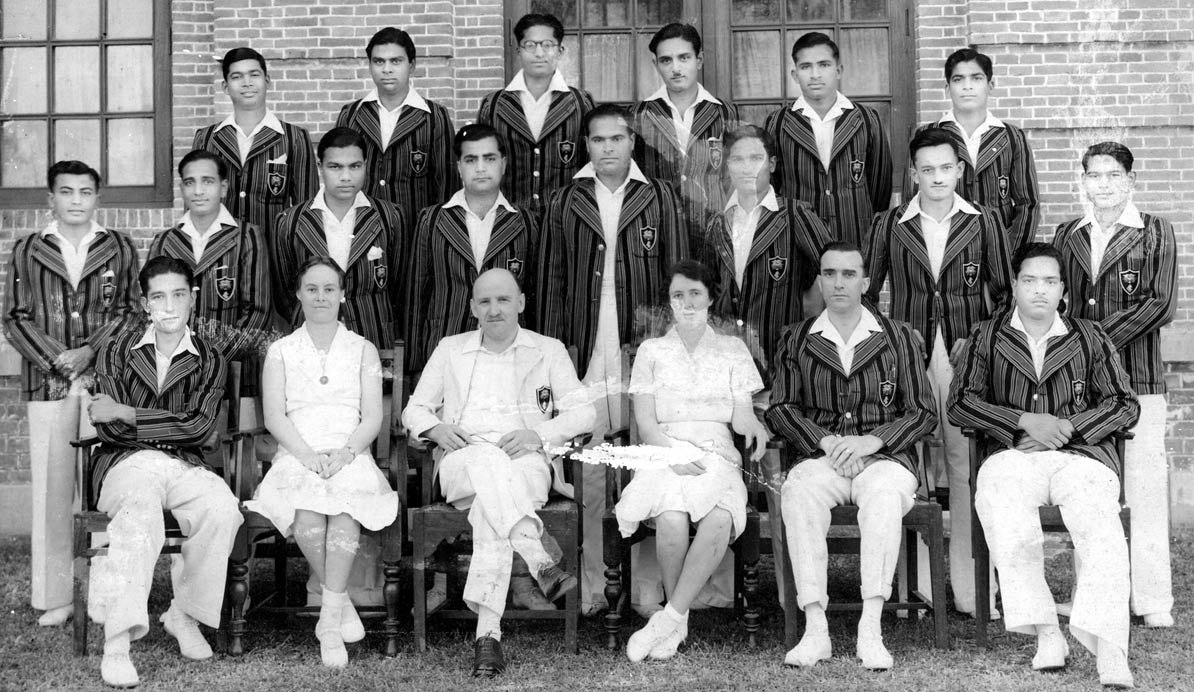
Dayanidhi Choudhury (middle row right most) in Indian Forest College, IFS Batch 1938-40.

== See also ==
- Nandankanan Zoological Park
- Simlipal National Park
