= Monginis =

Indian bakery chain

Monginis Foods Pvt. Ltd.
- Type: Private company
- Industry: Bakery, Cakery, Food Processing
- Founded: 1958; 68 years ago
- Founder: Hussein Khorakiwala
- Headquarters: Mumbai, Maharashtra, India
- Number of locations: 1000+ stores (2019)
- Area served: India; Egypt
- Key people: Zoher H. Khorakiwala (Chairman), Kumail H. Khorakiwala (Managing Director), Idris H. Khorakiwala (Managing Director), Quriash H. Khorakiwala (Managing Director), Qusai Z. Khorakiwala (Managing Director), Ebrahim Z. Khorakiwala (Managing Director), Aliasger K. Khorakiwala (Managing Director), Murtaza Q. Khorakiwala (Managing Director).
- Products: Cakes, Pastry, Chocolate, Savories, Confectioneries
- Number of employees: 1500+
- Subsidiaries: Delicia Foods
- Website: monginis.net (India) monginisbakery.com (Egypt)

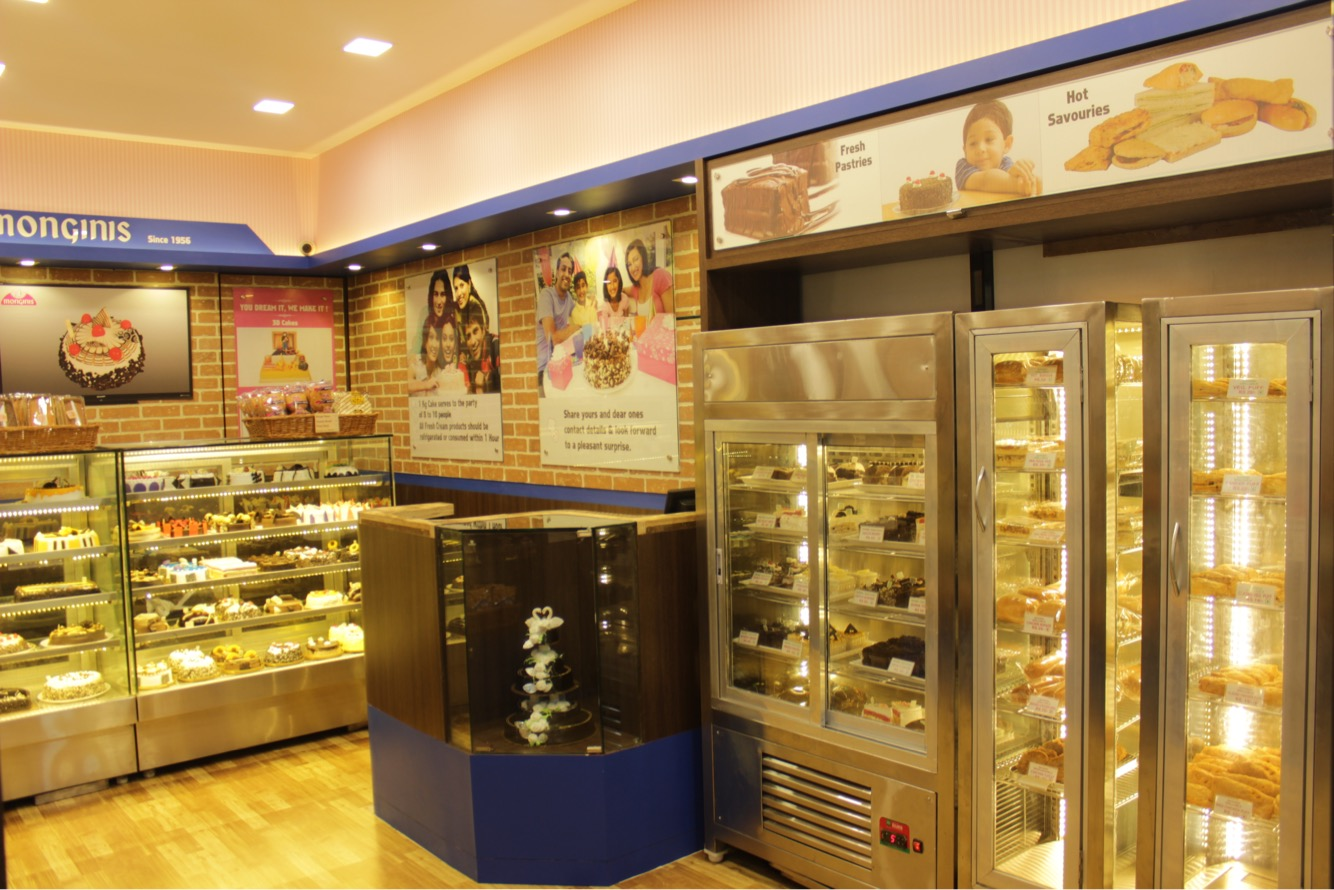
A Monginis cake shop in Mumbai

Monginis is an Indian multinational pastry and bakery chain based in Mumbai with outlets in India and Egypt.

== History ==
Early in the 20th century, two Italian brothers began a catering service in Mumbai's Fort precinct. In 1958, the business was acquired by the Khorakiwala family and became Monginis Foods Private Limited. In 1971, the company adopted a franchise model of based on localized production.

By 2012, the company reported an estimated valuation of 950 million rupees.

== Products ==
The chain sells both Indian and Western baked goods, including cakes, pastries and savouries. In addition, snack foods and breads are sold at Monginis stores. The company offers a product line for diabetics and releases themed products during festivals. In Egypt, the brand operates as Monginis Bakery and produces chocolates, cakes, pastries and oriental sweets.

== Locations ==
Monginis operates more than 1000 franchise outlets across India and Egypt. The company maintains production centers in 38 cities. In India, its outlets are located in multiple states, including Maharashtra, Gujarat, Karnataka, Tamil Nadu, Odisha, Uttar Pradesh, Delhi, Kerala, Telangana and West Bengal. In Egypt, the company operates in cities such as Alexandria, Cairo, Suez mansoura and Sharqia

== Products ==
Monginis produces a range of bakery and confectionery items, including:

- Cakes
- Pastries
- Chocolates
- Packaged items such as muffins, cake bars, Swiss rolls and brownies
- Confectionery items such as cookies and biscotti

== See also ==
- List of bakery cafés
