= Ekamra Kanan =

Botanical garden in Bhubaneswar, Odisha, India

- Location within Odisha
- Type: Botanical garden
- Location: Nayapalli, Bhubaneswar
- Coordinates: 20°18′14.25″N 85°48′12.83″E
- Area: 500 acres (200 ha)
- Operator: Regional Plant Resource Centre
- Open: 1985

Ekamra Kanan or Ekamra Kanan Botanical Gardens is a botanical garden and a park located in Bhubaneswar, Odisha, India. This is the biggest park and one of the most popular tourist attractions in the city. The park was established in 1985 and is spread over an area of 500 acres of land. This botanical park is a part of Government of Odisha's research organisation Regional Plant Resource Centre (RPRC). In 2017, the local residents and visitors complained that the authority was not taking proper care of the place. The aquatic garden was filled with weeds, and the place was not clean. In 2019, a 2-day flower-show was conducted here.

== See also ==
- List of parks in Bhubaneswar
