= Samantarapur =

Coordinates: 20.234°N 85.843°E

Samantarapur is located in Bhubaneswar, Odisha, India. It lies about 8 km (5.0 mi) from Bhubaneswar. Samantarapur was a village which is now part of the municipal corporation (Ward No. 59). The ward has one U.G.U.P. School and one High School (government schools) with three CBSE affiliated higher secondary schools (private schools: Gouri Shankar English medium school, Xavier school, Dayasagar English medium school), two commerce and science colleges (Kalinga and Gayatri) and one engineering college (Krupajal engineering college).
