= Rasulgarh =

- Neighborhood
- Rasulgarh Industrial Estate
- Interactive map of Rasulgarh
- Location within Odisha Location within India
- Coordinates: 20.2947678°N 85.8633326°E
- Country: India
- State: Odisha
- District: Khordha
- City: Bhubaneswar

Area
  - Total: 6.53 km^{2} (2.52 sq mi)
- Elevation: 27 m (89 ft)

Population (2011)
  - Total: 21,379
  - Estimate (2020): 46,477
  - Density: 3,270/km^{2} (8,480/sq mi)
- Time zone: UTC+5:30 (IST)
- Pincode: 751010
- Vehicle registration: OD-33
- Municipal Corporation: Bhubaneshwar

An area known for residential buildings and markets in ancient city of Odisha, Bhubaneswar.

== Overview ==
Rasulgarh, a neighborhood in Bhubaneswar of Khordha district, Odisha, India, is a popular area. There are many colonies situated here. Hi-Tech Medical College and Hospital is located just extreme westren side of the neighborhood.

== Economy ==
Nearby is Mancheswar Industrial Estate.

== Transport and Infrastructure ==
=== Railways ===
==== Vani Vihar P.H ====
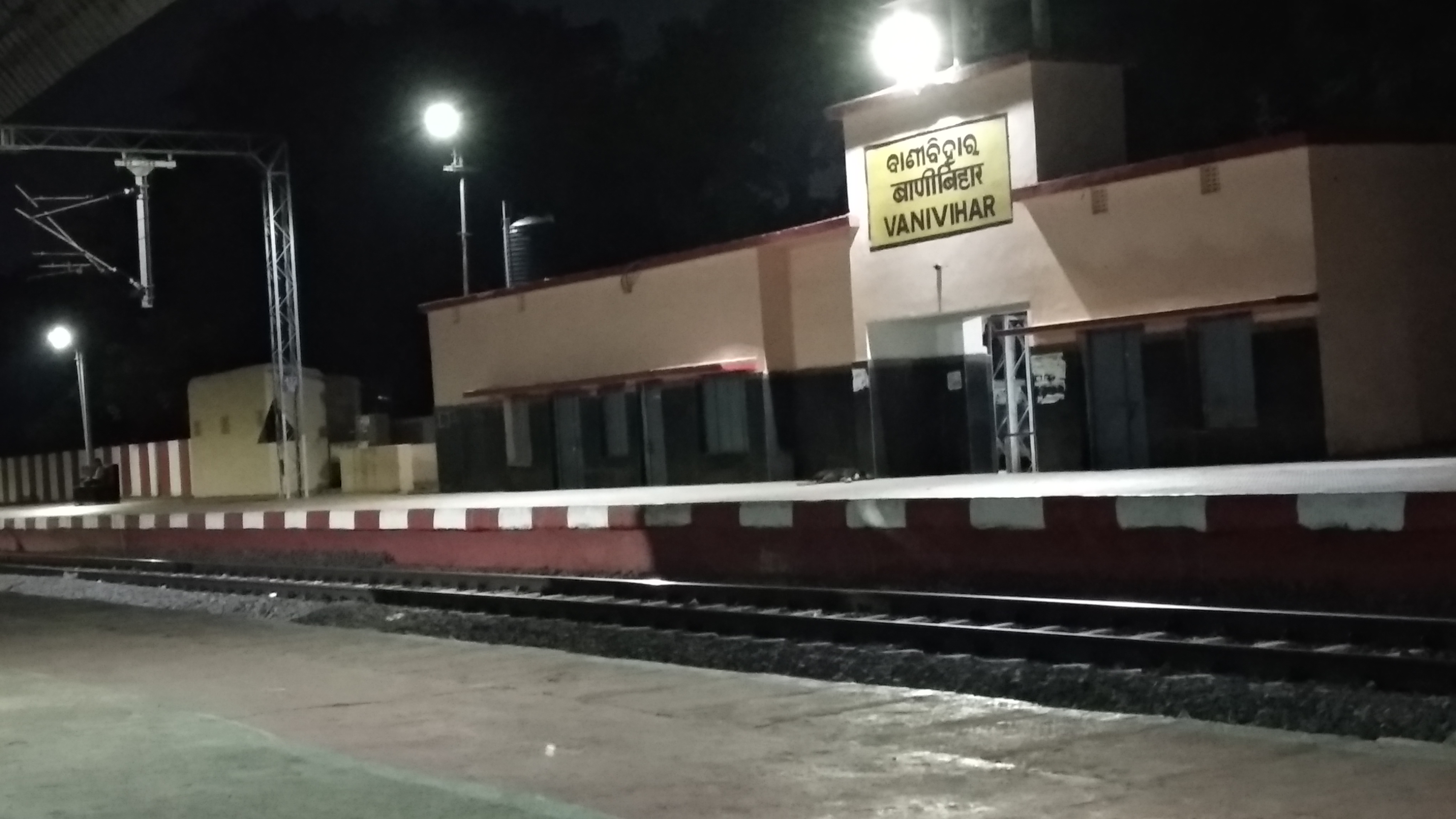
Vani Vihar railway station

Vani Vihar (Hindi: बाणी बिहार; Odia: ବାନି ବିହାର) is a railway station. It is used by people to cross from Shaheed Nagar to Rasulgarh. Station code is BNBH. It is on Howrah-Chennai railway line. It consists of 2 platforms.

==== Bhubaneswar ====
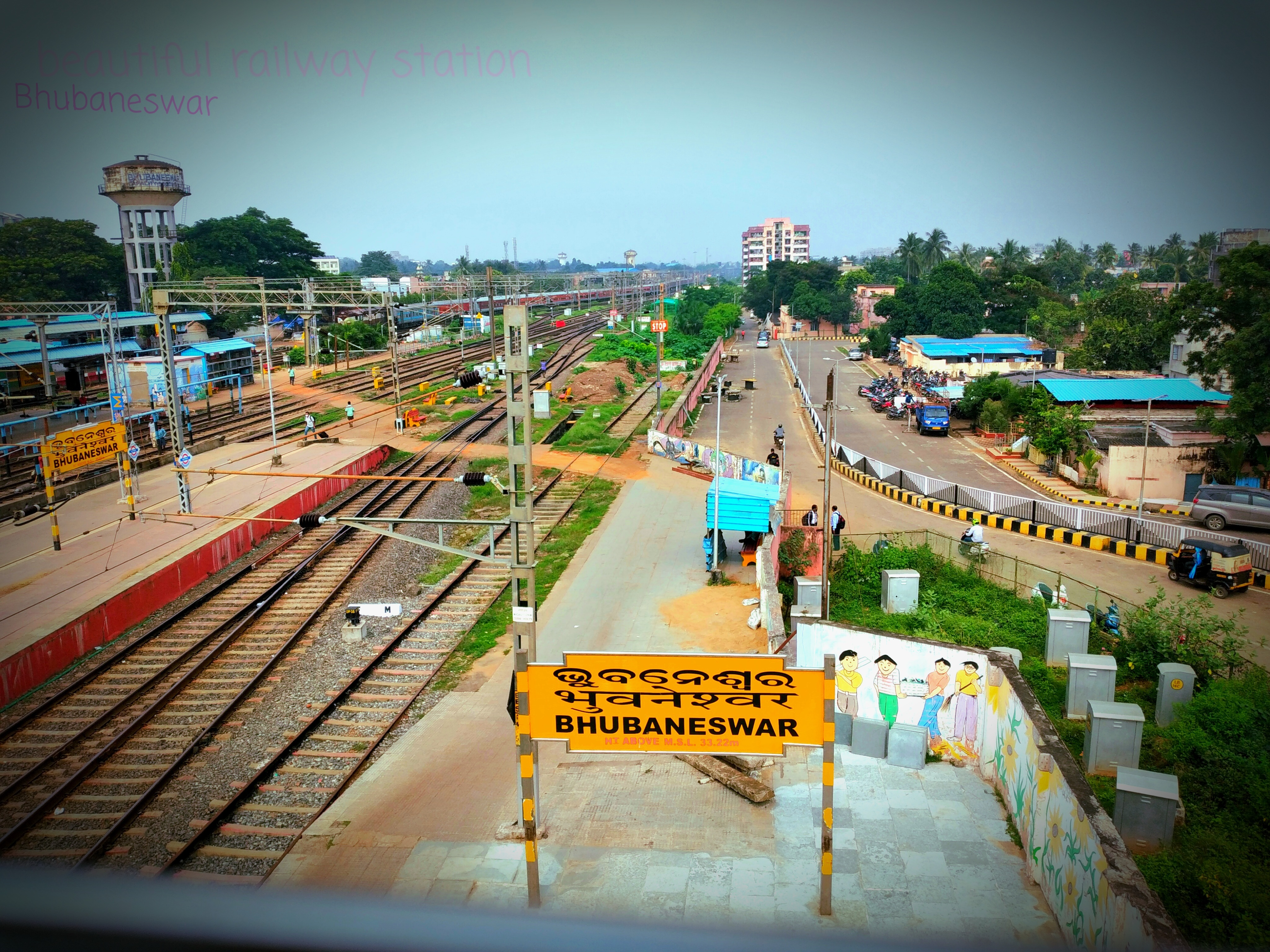
Bhubaneswar railway station

Bhubaneswar is an A+ and major railway station. The station code is BBS. It is situated in Howrah–Chennai main line. Number of platforms is 6. It was opened in 1896; 130 years ago. It was electrified in 2001; 25 years ago.

=== Airways ===
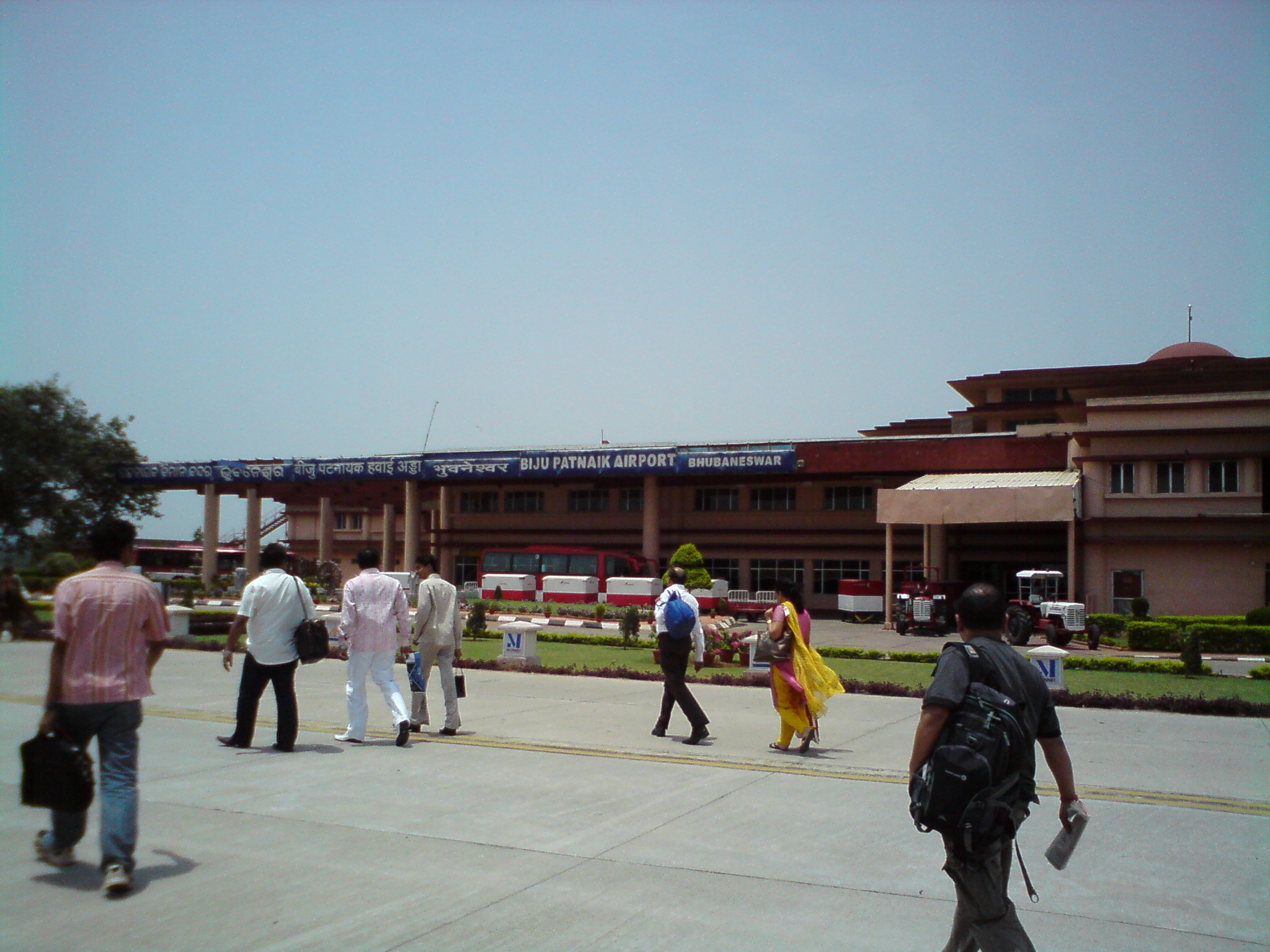
Biju Patnaik Airport

Biju Patnaik airport is an Airport in Bhubaneswar. It is named after Biju Patnaik. Nearest railway station is Lingaraj Temple Road PH. It is 9.3 kilometres (5.8 mi) from Rasulgarh. IATA code is BBI. Length of runway is 2,744 metres (9,003 ft).

=== Land ===
==== Bus ====
Baramunda Bus Stand

Baramunda, officially Babasaheb Bhimrao Ambedkar Bus Terminal, is a bus terminal. It is the largest bus stand in Odisha.

==== Roadways ====
Rasulgarh is connected by highways. Rasulgarh Flyover. Rasulgarh Chowk is a roundabout.

== Demographics ==
Per 2020, Rasulgarh has a population of 46,477 with 24,570 being males and 21,907 being females. Child (0–4) population is 3,410. Expected population growth (monthly) is 4.2%.

Population by age group
Age group	Male	Female	Total
+65	1,447	1,286	2,733
60-64	803	706	1,509
55-59	911	812	1,723
50-54	1,149	996	2,145
45-49	1,454	1,287	2,741
40-44	1,698	1,495	3,193
35-39	1,907	1,839	3,746
30-34	1,948	1,900	3,848
25-29	2,148	2,206	4,354
20-24	2,358	2,262	4,620
15-19	2,286	2,089	4,375
10-14	2,196	2,031	4,200
5-9	2,005	1,848	3,853
0-4	1,777	1,633	3,410

Source: GeoIQ
