= Chandrasekharpur =

Bhubaneswar city area

Coordinates: 20.328°N 85.811°E

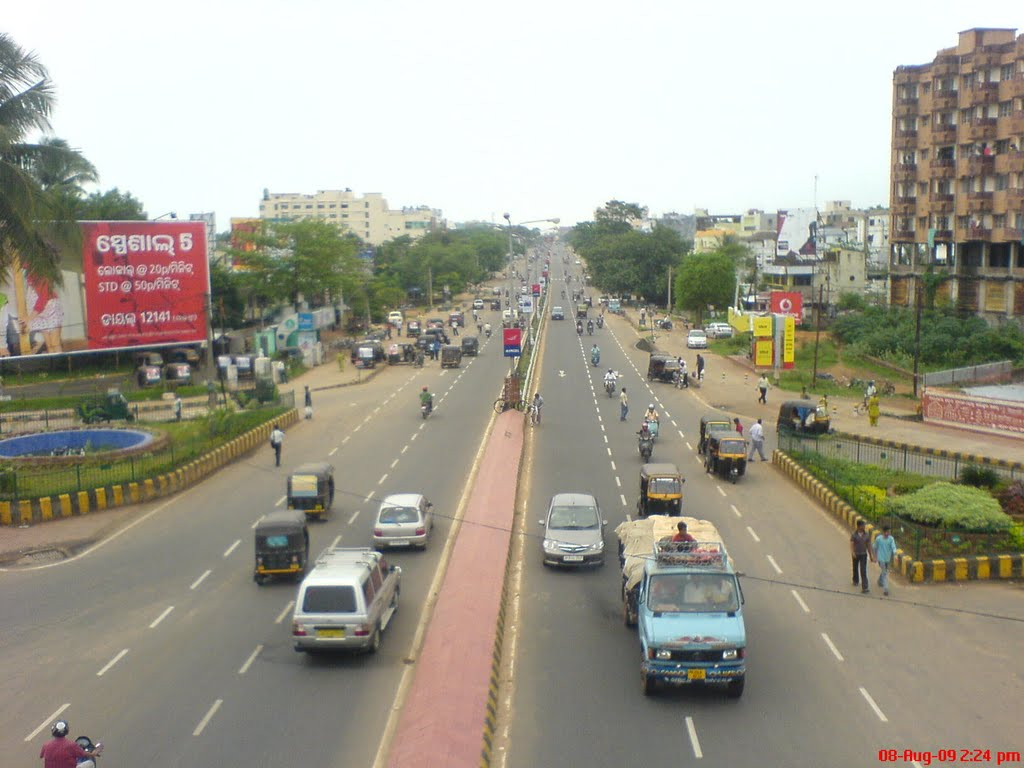
A busy road in Chandrasekharpur

Chandrasekharpur is a commercial area in Odisha's capital city, Bhubaneswar.

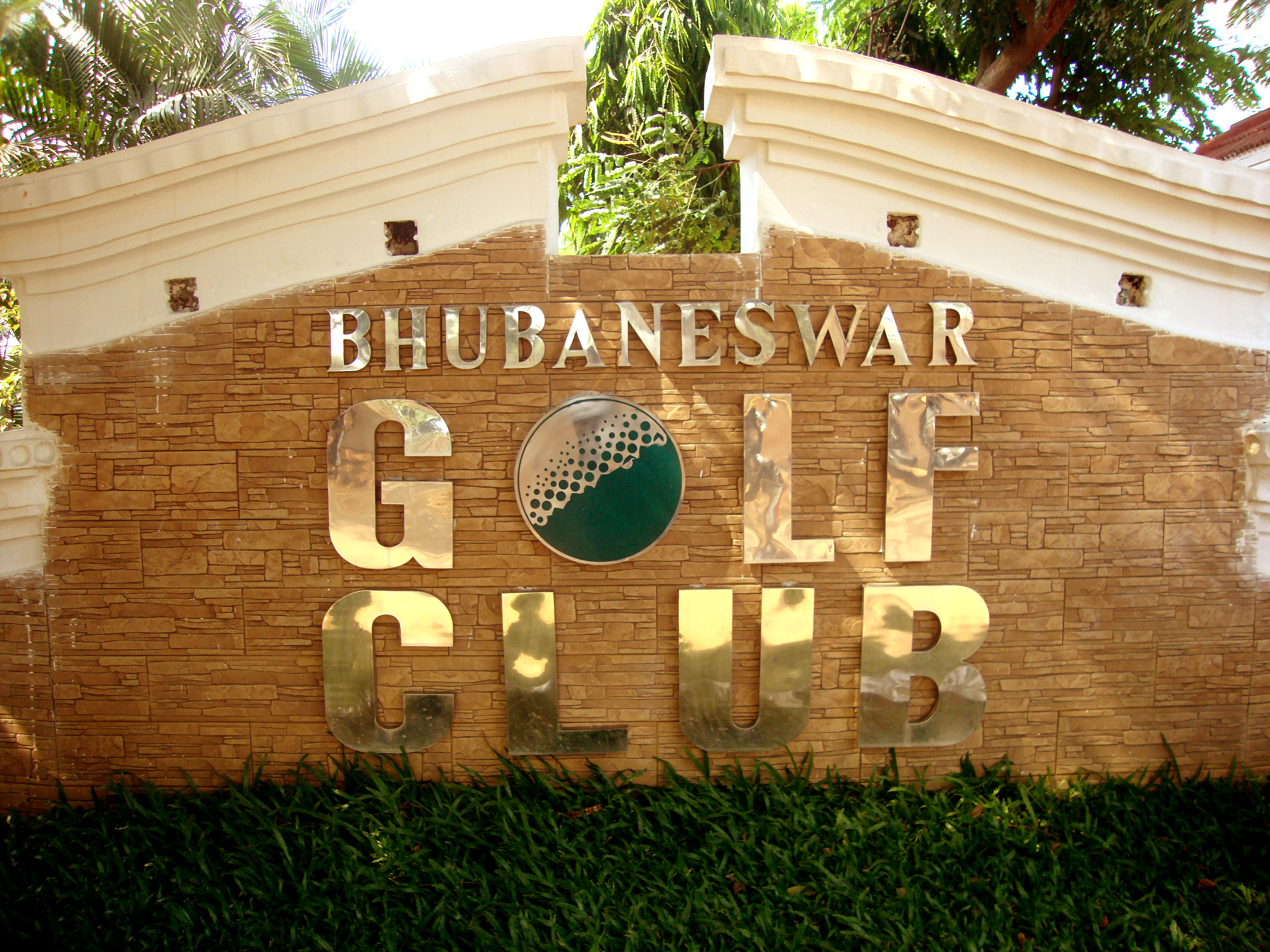
Bhubaneswar Golf Club

== Landmarks ==
- Bhubaneswar Golf Club
- Bhubaneswar Driving Test Centre
- Bhubaneswar Stock Exchange
- Software Technology Parks of India

== Economy ==
=== Information Technology ===
Many Information technology companies are present here.

- AABSyS IT
- ESSPL
- Infosys
- Mindtree
- Tata Consultancy Services
- Wipro
- Mahindra Satyam

=== Other Companies ===
It is also a hub for many other companies like :

- Monginis
- Ferro Alloys Corporation
- Fortune Tower
  - Aircel
  - Ericsson India
  - ESSAR Steel India Limited
  - Indian Railway Catering and Tourism Corporation (IRCTC)
  - Mittal Steel Company, India
  - Mitsubishi India
  - Odisha Power Generation Corporation
  - POSCO India
  - Reliance Industries
  - Reliance Communications
  - Semtech
  - Software Technology Parks of India
  - State Bank of India, Branch Office
  - Tata Steel
  - Tata Teleservices

== Education ==
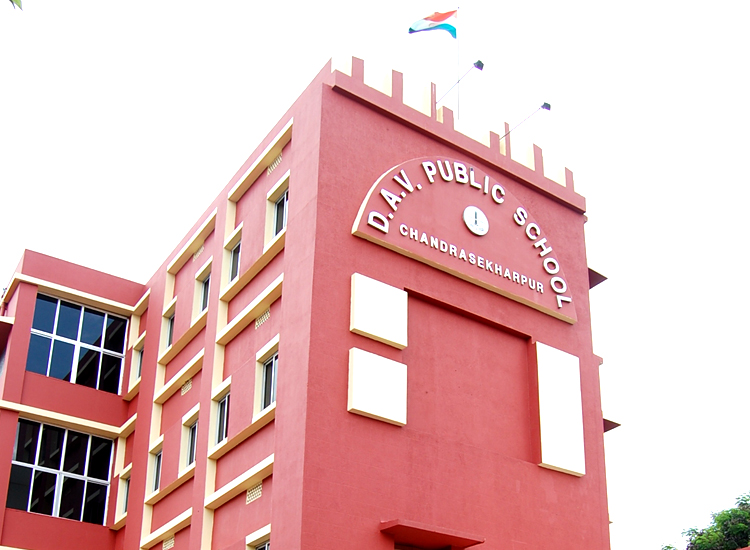
DAV Public School, Chandrasekharpur

=== Colleges/Universities ===
- Institute of Life Sciences
- KIIT School of Management
- Regional College of Management
- Regional Medical Research Centre, Bhubaneswar
- Silicon Institute of Technology

=== Schools ===
- D.A.V. Public School, Chandrasekharpur
- SAI International School
- KIIT International School

== Amenities ==
- Care Hospitals
