= Nandankanan Zoological Park =

Zoo and botanical garden in Odisha, India

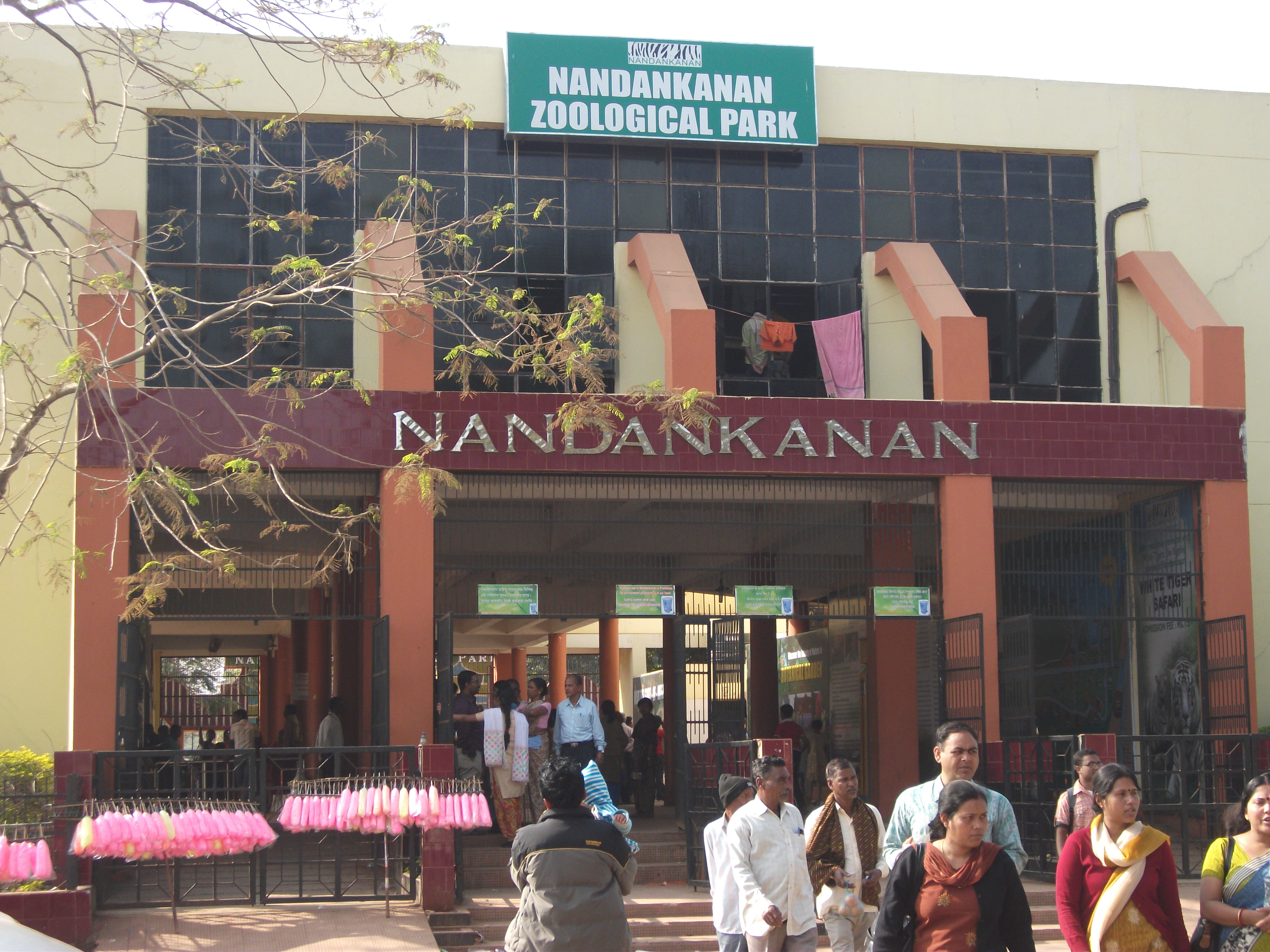
- Nandankanan Zoological Park
- Interactive map of Nandankanan Zoological Park
- 20.399965°N 85.814703°E
- Date opened: 29 December 1960
- Location: Barang, Odisha, India (Midway Cuttack & Bhubaneswar)
- Land area: 437 ha (1,080 acres)
- No. of animals: 3517 (2019-03-31)
- No. of species: 157 (2019)
- Annual visitors: 3.2 million (April 2018 – March 2019)
- Memberships: CZA, WAZA, SAZARC
- Major exhibits: White Tiger Safari, Lion Safari, Butterfly Park, Orchid house
- Director: Sri Sanath Kumar N, IFS
- Website: www.nandankanan.org

Nandankanan Zoological Park is a 437-hectare (1,080-acre) zoo and botanical garden located in Barang village, Odisha, India. It is 10 km to south of Cuttack and 10 km north of Bhubaneswar. Established in 1960, it was opened to the public in 1979 and became the first zoo in India to join World Association of Zoos and Aquariums (WAZA) in 2009. It also contains a botanical garden and part of it has been declared a sanctuary. Nandankanan, literally meaning The Garden of Heaven, is located in the environs of the Chandaka forest, and includes the 134-acre (54 ha) Kanjia lake.

A major upgrade was done in 2000 (after the damage caused by the super-cyclone of 1999 in coastal Odisha). More than 2.6 million visitors visit Nandankanan every year.

== History ==
Forest officials decided in 1960 that including rare plants and animals in the Odisha pavilion at the World Agricultural Fair in Delhi would help increase attendance. Word was sent to the forest department to capture as many small animals as possible for the display. In all, the forest department managed to capture two spotted deer (Axis axis), two barking deer (Muntiacus muntjak), two black buck (Antilope cervicapra), one mouse deer, one leopard cat, one flying squirrel, one racket-tailed drongo, one hornbill, two parrots, two hill mynah, one peacock, and a mongoose. In addition, the divisional forest officer of Deogarh captured a pangolin (scaly ant-eater) and two porcupines, and the divisional forest officer of Puri captured a pair of wild boars and a python. All of these animals were delivered to the Delhi fair and exhibited at the Odisha pavilion.

The State Finance Department raised objections to a zoo in Odisha because of the cost of both establishing and maintaining the facility. While the issue was being debated, animals arrived back at Bhubaneswar in May 1960, posing problems to the forest department for housing and feeding them. P. Mohandra (Divisional Forest Officer, Puri) and G. K. Das (Divisional Forest Officer, Deogarh) built temporary structures at Khandagiri for the animals, and the community of Jain helped feed them. Discussions about a real zoo started soon after Dr. H. K. Mahatab, the then Chief Minister of Odisha, visited the animals.

The initial proposal placed the zoo at Ghatikia, close to Khandagiri and Udayagiri caves. However, this was deemed to pose water problems in the future. A zoo needs lot of water to meet the need of animals, cleaning of animal's sheds and for various other purposes. The then Range Officer, Chandaka suggested Jujhagarh forest block on Kanjia lake near Barang Railway station as the most ideal location. The then Chief Conservator of Forests, Divisional Forest Officer, Puri, Range Officer, Chandaka and D.P. Ghosh, Forest Ranger visited the place and were impressed with its scenic beauty. Kanjia lake with its vast expanse over 125 acres, low and undulating hills of Jujhagarh and Krushnanagar D.P.F.S. with lush green vegetation on both sides of the lake presented a picturesque site. Jujhagarh Forest Block had all the advantages for locating the zoo except communication from Cuttack & Bhubaneswar and the only approach was via Gopalpur or Chandaka covering a distance of 38 km.

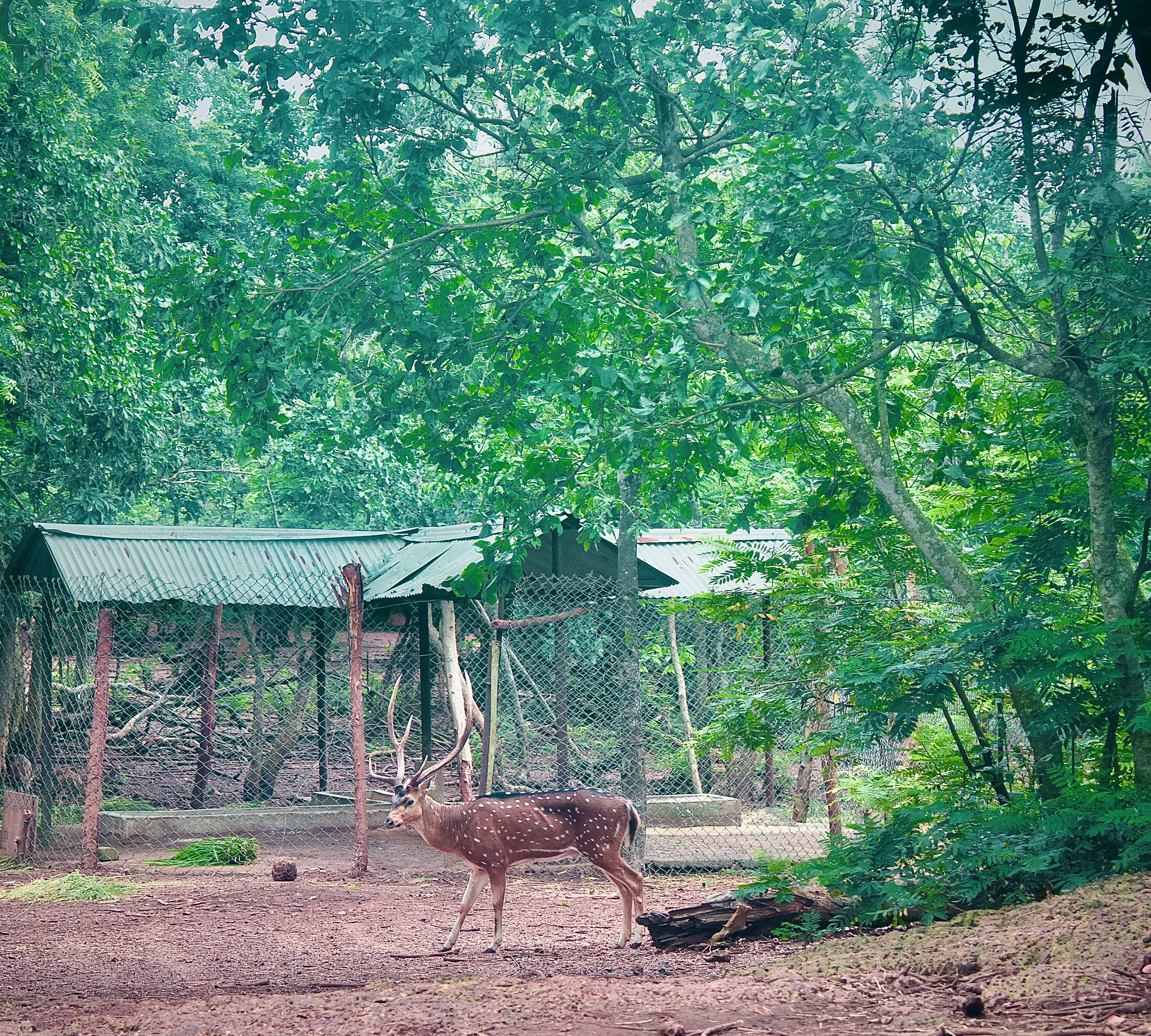
Spotted Deer at NandanKanan

A committee consisting of Dr. Radhanath Rath, Sri G.C. Dash and Sri D.N. Choudhury, the then Minister of Forests, Secretary, Forest and the Chief Conservator of Forests, respectively, visited the place. They were very much impressed with its aesthetic beauty and recommended the zoo to be located there with construction of a straight road (a distance of 14 to 15 km) from Bhubaneswar. Accordingly, it was decided to locate the Zoological Park in Jujhagarh Forest Block, Botanical garden in Krushnanagar Forest Block and develop Kanjia lake for Boating and Angling. The Director, Fisheries agreed to develop a portion of the lake for rearing various kinds of fish for visitors to see. Initially, it was decided to keep spotted deer, barking deer, black bucks, wild boars, sambars, nilgai and bears in spacious enclosures. Other animals like leopard cat, mongoose, flying squirrel, porcupine, python, monkeys, hyena, jackal, civet cat, pangolin, jungle cat, parrots, mynah and other birds in suitable cages. It was decided to put efforts to capture tigers and leopards which could be exhibited in suitable cages for the time-being and the suitable spacious enclosures would be built for them later on. It was also decided to raise a good flower garden and to plant important species and medicinal plants of Odisha inside proposed Botanical garden in Krushnanagar D.P.F. Eventually, the site around the 134-acre (54 ha) Kanjia Lake was chosen. The lake would be developed for recreation as well. A 15-kilometre (9.3 mi) road was built to the site, and Nandankanan Biological Park was officially inaugurated on 29 December 1960, by Sri S. K. Patil, then Indian Minister of Food and Agriculture.

A botanical garden was opened in 1963. The first tiger arrived at the zoo in 1964 from the Alipore Zoo in Calcutta, along with a pair of African lions, a pair of Mugger crocodiles, and a puma. The facility was renamed Nandankanan Zoological Park in 1981.

In 2009, Nandankanan Zoological Park became the first zoo in India to become a member of the World Association of Zoos and Aquariums (WAZA).

== Animals and exhibits ==
The zoo is home to about 1660 individual animals representing 166 species, including 67 species of mammals, 81 species of birds, and 18 species of reptiles. The death rate of animals here during the 2008–2009 fiscal year was one of the lowest in India, at 3.1% per year compared to the national average of 10%.

=== Mammals ===
- African lion
- Assam macaque
- Asian palm civet
- Asiatic lion
- Barasingha
- Bengal fox
- Bengal tiger
- Blackbuck
- Black-tufted marmoset
- Bonnet macaque
- Chimpanzee
- Chinkara
- Chital
- Common squirrel monkey
- Dhole
- Four-horned antelope
- Gaur
- Giraffe
- Golden jackal
- Hamadryas baboon
- Himalayan black bear
- Hippopotamus
- Honey badger
- Indian crested porcupine
- Indian elephant
- Indian flying fox
- Indian giant squirrel
- Indian grey mongoose
- Indian hare
- Indian hog deer
- Indian muntjac
- Indian pangolin
- Indian wolf
- Indian leopard
- Jungle cat
- Lion-tailed macaque
- Nilgai
- Plains zebra
- Red-handed tamarin
- Rhesus macaque
- Sambar deer
- Sangai
- Sloth bear
- Small Indian civet
- Sri Lankan spotted chevrotain
- Striped hyena
- Stump-tailed macaque
- Tufted capuchin
- Wild boar

=== Birds ===
The zoo has a large number of native and exotic birds, including:

- Alexandrine parakeet
- Asian koel
- Asian openbill
- Barbary dove
- Black-crowned night heron
- Black-headed ibis
- Black kite
- Black swan
- Black-throated finch
- Blossom-headed parakeet
- Brahminy kite
- Brown fish owl
- Brown-throated parakeet
- Budgerigar
- Cattle egret
- Chattering lory
- Cinereous vulture
- Cockatiel
- Coconut lorikeet
- Common emerald dove
- Common hill myna
- Common ostrich
- Diamond dove
- Eastern barn owl
- Eastern rosella
- Emu
- Eurasian spoonbill
- Fischer's lovebird
- Golden pheasant
- Great egret
- Green-cheeked parakeet
- Grey heron
- Grey parrot
- Indian grey hornbill
- Indian peafowl
- Indian vulture
- Intermediate egret
- Jandaya parakeet
- Java sparrow
- Lady Amherst's pheasant
- Laughing dove
- Lesser adjutant
- Little egret
- Livingstone's turaco
- Mandarin duck
- Masked lovebird
- Meyer's parrot
- Oriental scops owl
- Painted stork
- Rainbow lorikeet
- Red-and-green macaw
- Red avadavat
- Red-bellied parrot
- Red junglefowl
- Reeves's pheasant
- Ring-necked dove
- Rose-ringed parakeet
- Rosy-faced lovebird
- Rosy pelican
- Sarus crane
- Scaly-breasted munia
- Shikra
- Silver pheasant
- Society finch
- Spot-billed pelican
- Spotted dove
- Star finch
- Sun parakeet
- Sunda zebra finch
- Tricoloured munia
- Violet turaco
- White cockatoo
- White-rumped vulture
- Woolly-necked stork
- Yellow-crested cockatoo

=== Reptiles and amphibians ===
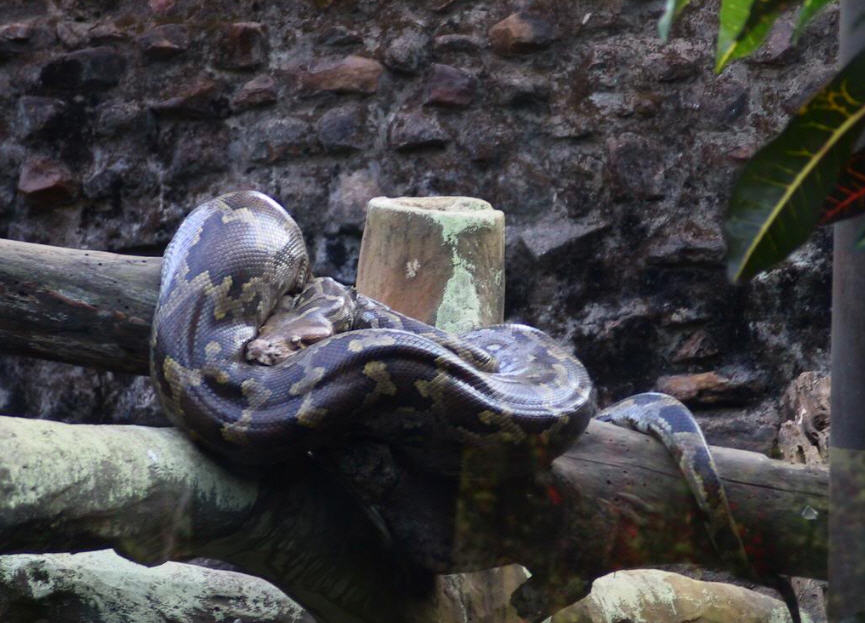
Python

The Zoo has a reptile house, with a cave-like entrance guarded by a life-size replica of aTyrannosaurus rex. This houses the majority of the zoo's reptiles and amphibians, including:

==== Reptiles ====
- Asian forest tortoise
- Asian water monitor
- Banded krait
- Bengal monitor
- Burmese python
- Common krait
- Cuvier's dwarf caiman
- Ganges softshell turtle
- Green iguana
- Indian chameleon
- Indian cobra
- Indian flapshell turtle
- Indian narrow-headed softshell turtle
- Indian python
- Indian tent turtle
- Indian sand boa
- Indian star tortoise
- King cobra
- Monocled cobra
- Morelet's crocodile
- Mugger crocodile
- Nile crocodile
- Oriental ratsnake
- Reticulated python
- Russell's boa
- Russell's viper
- Saltwater crocodile
- Siamese crocodile
- Yellow anaconda

==== Amphibians ====
- Chunam tree frog
- Green pond frog
- Indian skipper frog
- Indus Valley bullfrog
- Marbled toad

=== Aquaria ===
The zoo includes 34 aquaria which are home to a large variety of freshwater fish.

=== Orchid house ===
The zoo will have the largest orchid house of Odisha soon spreading over 5,000 square feet (460 m^{2}). In Odisha alone, 130 species of orchids have been documented to date.

== Breeding programs ==
The zoo enjoys a good reputation internationally for successfully breeding black panthers, gharials, and white tigers in captivity.

=== White tigers ===
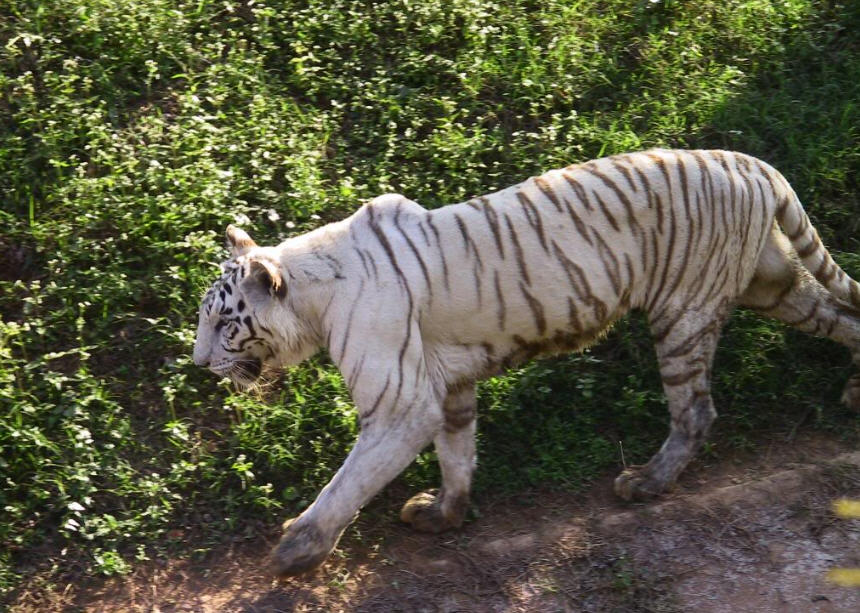
White tiger in the Zoo

Three white tigers were born in the Nandankanan Zoo in Bhubaneswar, Odisha, India in 1980. Their parents were an orange father–daughter pair called Deepak and Ganga, who were not related to Mohan or any other captive white tiger. One of their wild-caught ancestors would have carried the recessive white gene, and it showed up when Deepak was mated to his daughter. Deepak's sister also turned out to be a white gene carrier. These white tigers are therefore referred to as the Odisha strain, as opposed to the Rewa strain, of white tigers founded by Mohan.

When the surprise birth of three white cubs occurred, there was a white tigress already living at the zoo, named Diana, from the Delhi Zoo. One of the three was later bred to her creating another blend of two unrelated strains of white tigers. This lineage resulted in several white tigers in Nandankanan Zoo. Today, the Nandankanan Zoo has the largest collection of white tigers in India. The Cincinnati Zoo acquired two female white tigers from the Nandankanan Zoo, in the hopes of establishing a line of pure-Bengal white tigers in America, but they never got a male, and didn't receive authorization from the Association of Zoos and Aquariums (AZA)'s Species Survival Plan (SSP) to breed them. The Zoo Outreach Organisation used to publish studbooks for white tigers, which were compiled by A.K. Roychoudhury of the Bose Institute in Calcutta, and subsidized by the Humane Society of India. The Columbus Zoo had also hoped to breed pure-Bengal white tigers, but were unable to obtain a white registered Bengal mate for Rewati from India.

There were also surprise births of white tigers in the Asian Circus, in India, to parents not known to have been white gene carriers, or heterozygotes, and not known to have any relationship to any other white tiger strains. There was a female white cub born at Mysore Zoo in 1984, from orange parents, descended from Deepak's sister. The white cub's grandmother, Thara, came from the Nandankanan Zoo in 1972. Mysore Zoo had a second female white tiger cub from New Delhi Zoo in 1984. On 29 August 1979, a white tigress named Seema was dispatched to Kanpur Zoo to be bred to Badal, a tiger who was a fourth generation descendant of Mohan and Begum. The pair did not breed so it was decided to pair Seema with one of two wild-caught, notorious man-eaters, either Sheru or Titu, from the Jim Corbett National Park. Seema and Sheru produced a white cub, and for a while, it was thought there might be white genes in Corbett's population of tigers, but the cub didn't stay white.

There have been other cases of white tiger, white lion, and white panther cubs being born, and then changing to normal colour. White tigers which were a mixture of the Rewa and Odisha strains, born at the Nandankanan Zoo, were non-inbred. A white tiger from out of the Odisha strain found its way to the Taronga Western Plains Zoo in Australia. Australia's Dreamworld, on the Gold Coast, wanted to breed this tiger to one of their white tigers from the United States.

=== Crocodilians ===
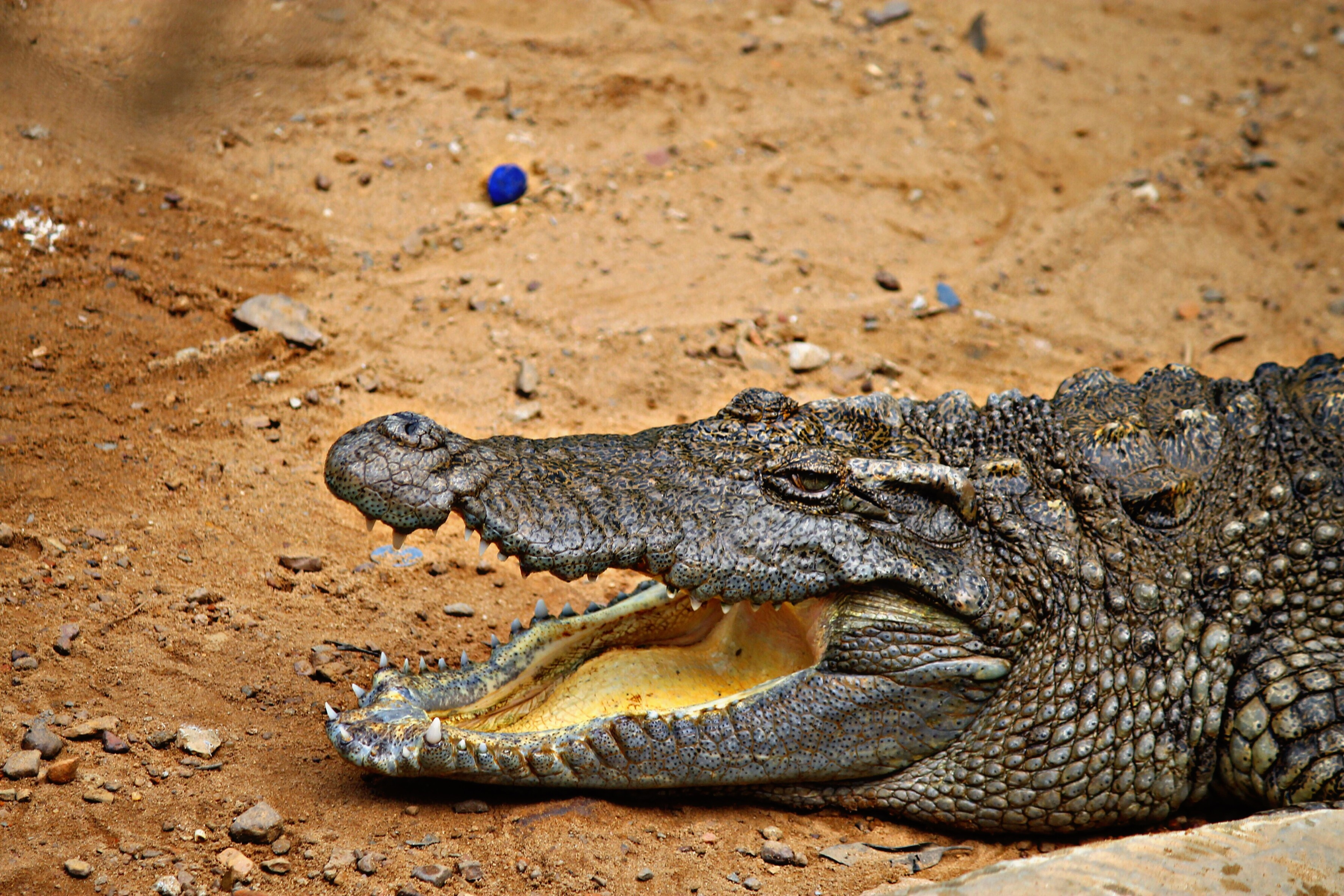
Crocodile

Captive breeding units of all the three crocodilian species have been established at Nandankanan Zoo. In 1980, the gharial was bred in captivity for the first time at the Nandankanan Biological Park in Odisha. This successful effort involved the collaboration and coordination between international and national zoological parks. The male came from the Frankfurt zoo and the females were from the Nandankanan and Trivandrum zoos. A large part of the credit for this first time ex-situ breeding in captivity goes to the meticulous planning and designing of the breeding enclosure at the Nandankanan Zoo by Dr. H. R. Bustard, which simulates the gharial's natural habitat of a deep flowing river with adequate high-rise sandbanks. The breeding enclosure, together with a judicious mix of adult size classes to form a social group, minimal disturbance and provision of natural food culminated in that success story, which continues to the present date. The Nandankanan Biological park has since provided many zoos around the world with captive-bred gharials for display and education. Muggers bred at Nandankanan Zoo have also been released in Satkosia Gorge.

=== Pangolins ===
The zoo was the first in India to successfully breed pangolins. In a programme started before the Central Zoo Authority (CZA) pangolin breeding programme, the zoo authorities started the programme in the nocturnal centre of the animal park. There are 10 pangolins in Nandankanan Zoo, including six females.

== Adopt-an-Animal programme ==
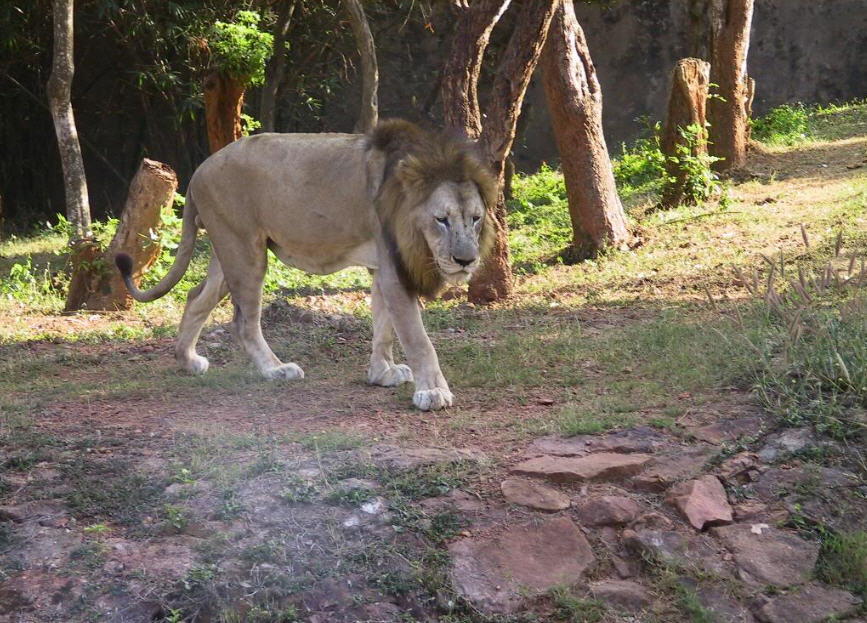
Asiatic lion in the zoo

To help involve the general public in animal conservation and raise money, the zoo started the Adopt-an-Animal programme in 2008 for all of its animals. Adopters receive a customized adoption certificate and one free entry ticket for each animal adopted. In addition, the adopter's name is displayed on a special board and a special mention made in the annual report of the zoo. Adopters can pay from ₹500 for a small bird to ₹100,000 for a tiger for a year. The zoo authorities have made available two of the most attractive sites for adoption which are the Lion Safari and Tiger Safari for which the adoption cost is ₹1,000,000 and ₹500,000 respectively. Although other zoos also have adoption programs, Nandankanan was the first zoo to get a tax exemption under section 80G of the Income Tax Act. Funds received under the program are used to support the zoo's care and services for all its inhabitants by providing quality food to meet their nutritional requirements, medical care, equipment, enclosure upgrades, and biodiversity enrichment. The parents of two students Sristi and Prakriti from Cuttack were the first to adopt, paying ₹4,000 to adopt a blue and yellow macaw. The State Bank of India donated ₹500,000 to adopt six endangered animals including a one-horned rhinoceros, white Bengal tiger, chimpanzee, and an orangutan. The Confidence Factory, near Bhubaneswar, adopted a Royal Bengal Tigress Rebati in 2012.
