= Bhimesvara Bisrama ghara =

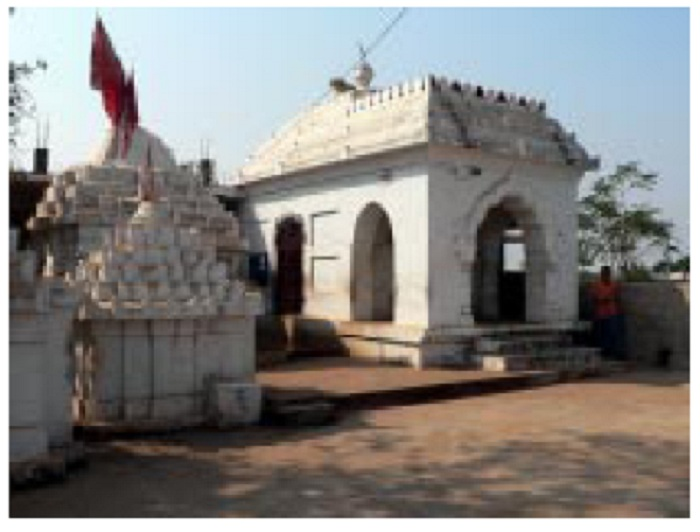

- Location in Orissa

Religion
- Affiliation: Hinduism

Location
- Location: Bhubaneswar
- State: Orissa
- Country: India
- Interactive map of Bhimesvara Bisrama ghara
- Coordinates: 20°14′22″N 85°49′27″E

Architecture
- Elevation: 38 m (125 ft)

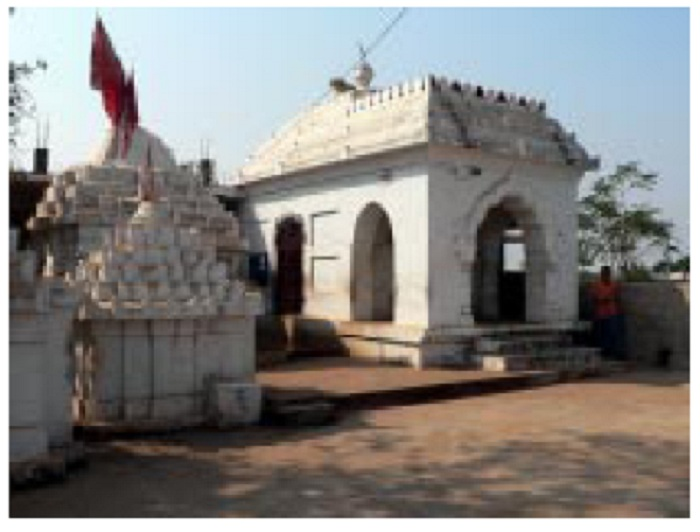
Bhimesvara Bisrama ghara in Bhubaneswar

Bhimesvara Bisrama ghara is located in the Bhimesvara temple precinct in the Kapila Prasad, Housing Board Colony, Bhimatangi, Bhubaneswar. It is facing towards north. It has pyramidal superstructure.

== Traditions & legends ==
Locals legend associates the precinct with the Pandava brothers.

== Ownership ==
- Single/ Multiple: Multiple
- Public/ Private: Private

Bhimesvara Mandira Parichalana Samiti

== Age ==
- Approximate date: 18th–19th Century A.D.
- Source of Information: Architectural features and building materials

== Property Type ==
- Precinct/ Building/ Structure/Landscape/Site/Tank: Precinct
- Subtype: Temple
- Typology: pidha deul

== Property use ==
Abandoned/ in use: In use.

== Significance ==
Cultural significance: Sivaratri, Kartika Purnima, Dola Purnima are performed.

== Physical description ==
Surrounding: The Rest house is surrounded by another rest house in west at a distance of 1.35 metres, compound wall on east at a distance of 4.00 metres, Arjunesvara temple on north within a distance of 1.85 metres and a modern structure in south at a distance of 1.50 metres.

Orientation: The Rest house is facing towards north.

=== Architectural features (Plan & Elevation) ===
On plan, the structure has a square vimana measuring 4.00 square metres, with a frontal porch measuring 2.00 metres in length. On elevation, the vimana is in pidha order that measures 5.03 metres in height from pabhaga to mastaka. From bottom to the top the temple has a bada, gandi and mastaka. With fivefold divisions of the bada the temple has a panchanga bada measuring 2.53 metres in height. Pabhaga measures 0.49 metres, tala jangha 0.62 metres, bandhana 0.23 metres, upara jangha 0.61 metres 42 and baranda 0.59 metres. The gandi measures 2.00 metres and mastaka 0.50 metres.

=== Decorative features ===
- Door Jambs: There are two door ways leading into the sanctum
- Lintel: Lintel is plain
- Building material: Laterite
- Construction techniques: Ashlar masonry with lime and cement mortar.
- Style: Kalingan

== State of preservation ==
- Good/Fair/ Showing Signs of Deterioration/Advanced: Good

== Grade (A/B/C) ==
- Architecture: C
- Historic: C
- Associational: C
- Social/Cultural: C

== Reference and notes ==
- K.C. Panigrahi, Archaeological Remains at Bhubaneswar, Calcutta, 1961. P. 174.
- L. S.S. O’ Malley, Bengal District Gazetter Puri, Calcutta 1908, P. 241.
- M.M. Ganguly, Orissa and Her Remains, Calcutta, 1912, P. 274.
- R.L. Mitra. The Antiquities of Orissa, Calcutta, 1963, P. 162.
