= Orissa Public Health Engineering Organisation =

Public Health Engineering Organisation
- Company type: Government of Odisha
- Industry: Water Supply, Sewerage, IIoT, NIC
- Founded: 1956
- Headquarters: Bhubaneswar, Odisha, India
- Area served: Odisha, India
- Website: pheoodisha.gov.in

Public Health Engineering Organisation (PHEO) is a public agency formed in 1956 by the Government of Odisha, under the administrative control of Housing and Urban Development Department assigned with task of providing water supply and sewerage facilities to the urban parts in the state of Odisha.
