= List of Indian spices =

Variety of spices grown across the Indian subcontinent

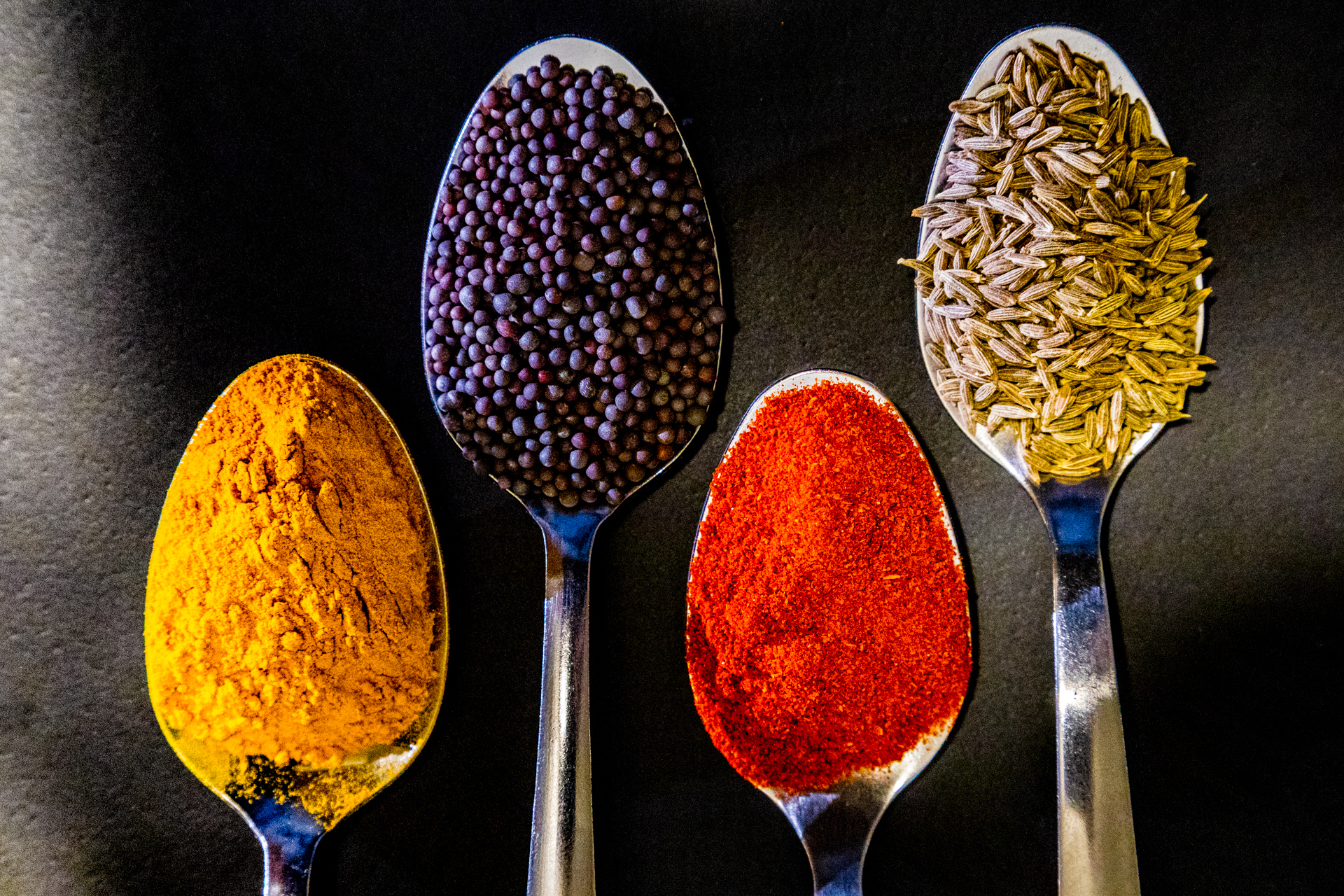
Turmeric powder, mustard seeds, chili powder, cumin seeds

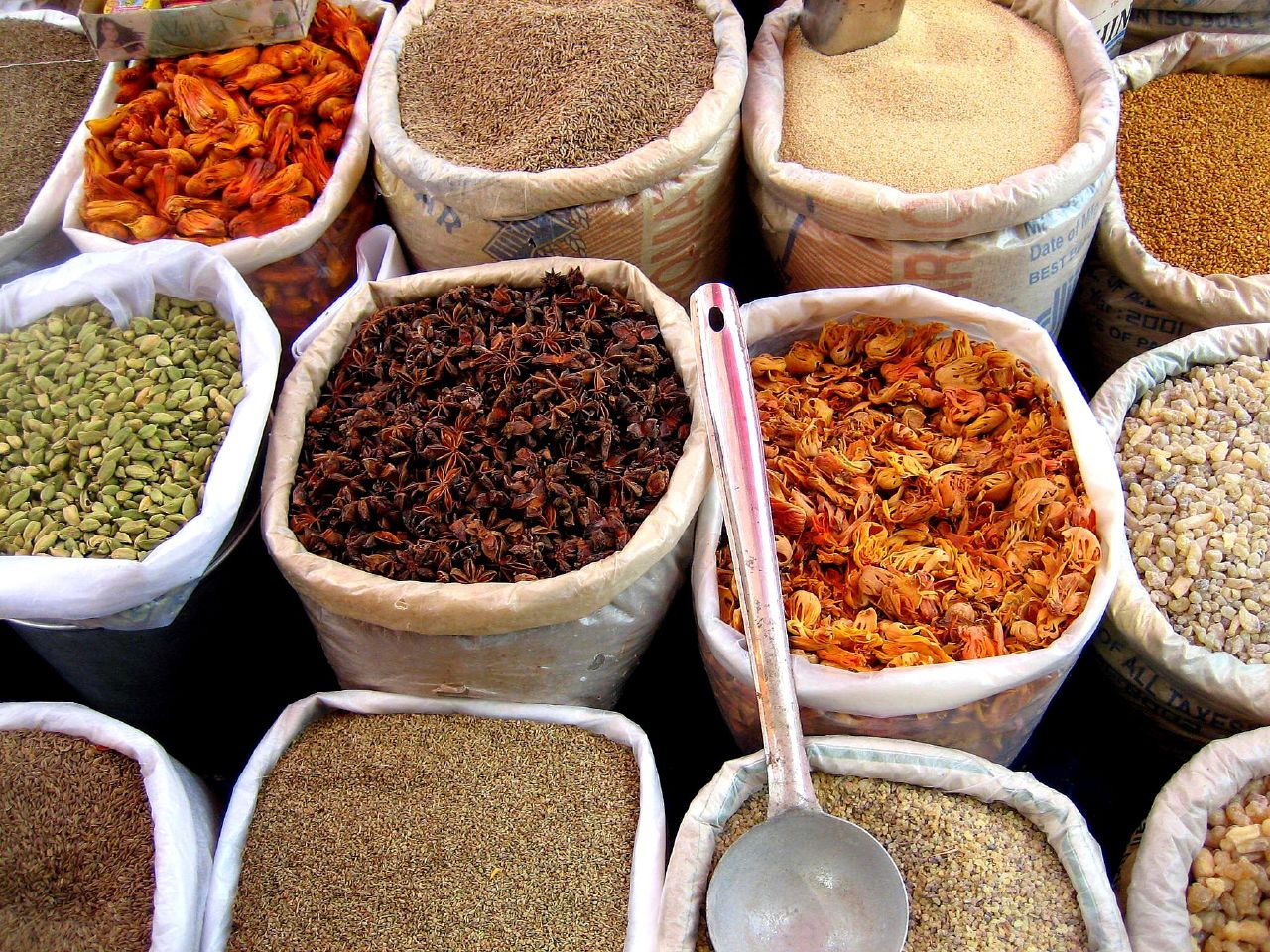
Spices at a Goa market

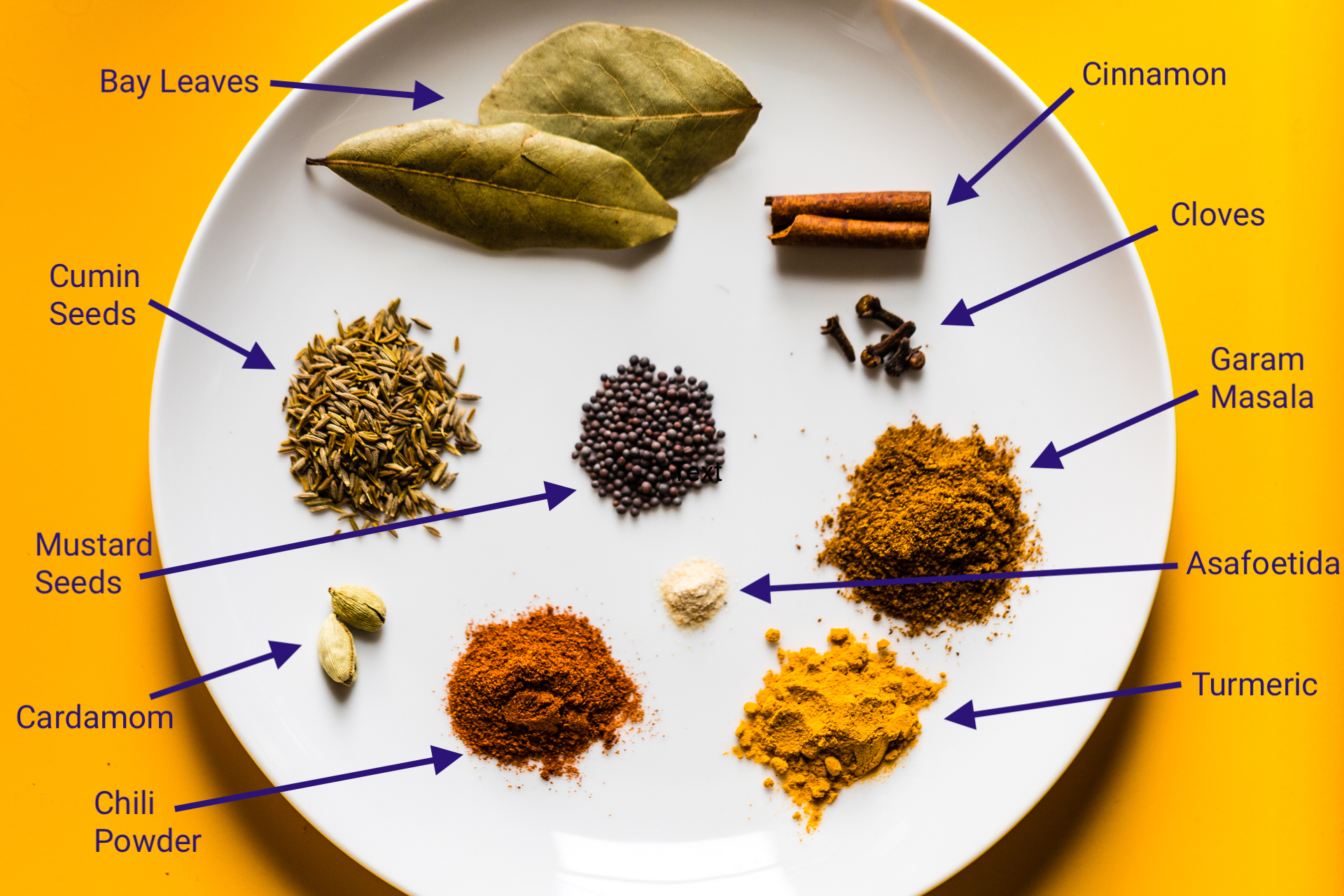
Indian spices with labels (garam masala components)

Indian spices include a variety of spices grown across the Indian subcontinent (a sub-region of South Asia). With different climates in different parts of the country, India produces a variety of spices, many of which are native to the subcontinent. Others were imported from similar climates and have since been cultivated locally for centuries. Pepper, turmeric, cardamom, and cumin are some examples of Indian spices.

Spices are used in different forms: whole, chopped, ground, roasted, sautéed, fried, and as a topping. They blend food to extract the nutrients and bind them in a palatable form. Some spices are added at the end as a flavouring — those are typically heated in a pan with ghee (Indian clarified butter) or cooking oil before being added to a dish. Lighter spices are added last, and spices with strong flavour should be added first. "Curry" refers to any dish in Indian cuisine that contains several spices blended together, whether dry or with a gravy base. However, it also refers to curry leaves, commonly used in South India.

Below is a list of spices and other flavouring substances commonly used in India.

| Image | Standard English | Notes |
|---|---|---|
| | Alkanet root | (Hindi: Ratanjot रतनजोत) |
| | Amchoor | Raw unripe mango is sun-dried and then ground to fine powder. (Hindi: Amchoor आमचूर) |
| | Asafoetida | Intensely aromatic – flavor profile sometimes compared to that of truffles and garlic. Used as a tempering spice. (Hindi: Hing हिंग, हिङ्ग) |
| | Bay leaf, Indian bay leaf | Both Indian bay leaf and bay leaf are similar and called Tejpatra or Tamalpatra (तमलपत्र) in Hindi. However, they are from two different species and have differences in taste. Used as a tempering spice. (Hindi: Tej Patta तेज पत्ता) |
| | Black cardamom | Very earthy and darkly aromatic. Often used in North Indian curries. Used as a tempering spice. (Hindi: Badi Elaichi बड़ी इलाइची) |
| | Black peppercorns | Pepper may be used whole or ground in Indian cuisines. The largest producer is the southern Indian state of Kerala. Used as a tempering spice. (Hindi: Kali Mirch काली मिर्च) |
| | Charoli | Also known as chironji, Cuddapah almond or almondette; a type of nut particularly used in making desserts. (Hindi: Chironji चिरौंजी) |
| | Capers | They are immature flower buds of Capparius spinosa, also known as caper berry. (Hindi: Kabra कब्र) |
| | Capsicum or bell pepper | (Hindi: Shimla Mirch शिमला मिर्च) |
| | Caraway seeds | Used as a tempering spice. (Hindi: Shahijeera शाहजीरा) |
| | Thymol/Carom seeds | Also known as bishop's weed, they are different from celery seeds and radhuni seeds Used as Tempering Spice. (Hindi: Ajwain अजवायन) |
| | Cassia buds | Also known as Mesua ferrea; the unopened flowers of the cinnamon tree that are picked just before blooming and dried in the sun. Used in Ayurveda for treating fever, vomiting, UTIs, migraines, etc. Also used in Chyavanprash. Used as a tempering spice. Hindi: (Maal-kangni मालकांगनी or Nagkesar नागकेसर) |
| | Char magaz | A mixture of four types of melon seed kernels (watermelon, cantaloupe, cucumber, pumpkin). (Hindi: Char Magaz चार मगज) |
| | Cinnamon | Grown commercially in Kerala in southern India. Two types, cassia (common) and royal. Used as a tempering spice. (Hindi: Dalchini दालचीनी) |
| | Citric acid | (Hindi: Nimbu Sat निम्बू सत) |
| | Cloves | Kerala, Tamil Nadu, and Karnataka are largest producers in India. Used as Tempering Spice. (Hindi: Laung लौंग) |
| | Coriander seed | Also used in powdered form. Used as a tempering spice. (Hindi: Sabut Dhaniya साबुत धनिया) |
| | Cubeb or tailed pepper | Tastes of clove with added bitterness with a persistent mild numbing sensation (Hindi: Sheetal Cheeni शीतलचीनी/Kabab Cheeni कबाब चीनी) |
| | Cumin seed | Used as a tempering spice. (Hindi: Jeera जीरा) |
| | Cumin seed ground into balls | (Hindi: Jeera Goli जीरा गोली) |
| | Curry leaf | Foliage of the curry tree. Cannot retain flavour when dried. Only used fresh. (Hindi: Kari Patta करी पत्ता) |
| | Fennel seed | Used as natural mouth-freshener. Used as a tempering spice. (Hindi: Saunf सौंफ़, सौंफ) |
| | Fenugreek leaf | (Hindi: Methi मेथी) |
| | Dry Fenugreek leaves | It is rubbed gently in the palms of the hands and sprinkled over the cooked dish towards the end. (Hindi: Kasuri Methi कसूरी मेथी) |
| | Fenugreek seed | Used as a tempering spice. (Hindi: Methi dana मेथी दाना) |
| | Garcinia gummi-gutta | Used in fish preparations in Kerala (Malayalam: kudampuli കുടംപുളി) (Hindi: kudampuli कुदमपुली) |
| | Garam masala | Blend of eight or more warming spices. Each family has its own recipe. (Hindi: Garam Masala गरम मसाला) |
| | Garcinia indica | Used mainly in Maharashtrian Konkan and Gujarati cuisine. It has a sour taste with a faintly sweet aroma. (Hindi: Kokam कोकम) |
| | Garlic | (Hindi: Lahsun लहसुन) |
| | Ginger | (Hindi: Adarak अदरक) |
| | Dried ginger | Mostly powdered. (Hindi: Sonth सोंठ) |
| | Green cardamom | Malabar variety is native to Kerala. Used as a tempering spice. (Malayalam: Elam ഏലം) (Hindi: Hari Elaichi हरी इलायची) |
| green chilli | Green chili pepper | (Hindi: Hari Mirch हरी मिर्च) |
| | Indian gooseberry | It is used in Chyavanprash. (Hindi: Amla आंवला) |
| | Inknut | Also called haritaki. Used in Ayurveda for treating chronic ulcer, diarrhea, dysentery and piles. (Hindi: Harad हरड़) |
| | Jakhya | Also called dog mustard or wild mustard. Used in Garhwali and Kumaoni styles of cuisines. Tasteless and odorless when uncooked; earthy and crunchy when crackled in oil. (Hindi: Jakhya जख्या) |
| | Black Stone Flower | It has a strong earthy aroma and a very dry, light fluffy texture and feel to it. It is widely used in Chettinad cuisine and to some extent in Hyderabadi and Marathi cuisine. (Hindi: Pathar phool पत्थर फूल) |
| | Guizotia abyssinica | (Hindi: Ramtil रामतिल) |
| | Liquorice powder | (Hindi: Mulethi मुलेठी) |
| | Mint leaves | (Hindi: Pudina पुदीना) |
| | Rose petals | (Hindi: Gulāb ke patte गुलाब के पत्ते) |
| | Long pepper | Used in South Indian cuisines. (Hindi: Pippali पिप्पली) |
| | Kaachri | (Hindi: Kaachri काचरी) |
| | Mango extract | (Hindi: Aam ka sat आम का सत) |
| | Marathi moggu | (Hindi: Kapok Bud कपोक बड, Marathi Moggu मराठी मोग्गु, or Semar सेमर) |
| | Yellow mustard seed | Used as a tempering spice. (Hindi: Sarson सरसों) |
| | Brown mustard seed | Used as a tempering spice. (Hindi: Rai राई) |
| | Naagkeshar | Used in Maharashtrian cuisine as one of the ingredients of godaa masaalaa. (Hindi: Nagkeshar नागकेसर) |
| | Nigella seed | Gives smoky, nutty flavor; dry-roasted or used as a tempering spice (Hindi: Kalonji कलौंजी) |
| | Nutmeg | (Hindi: jaayaphal जायफल) |
| | Mace | Mace is the outer covering of nutmeg nut and has a similar aroma. (Hindi: Javitri जावित्री) |
| | Panch phoron | This is a Bengali spice mix that combines fennel seeds, cumin seeds, fenugreek seeds, mustard seeds and nigella seeds. Used as tempering spices. (Hindi: Panch Phoran पंचफोरन) |
| | Pomegranate seed | Dried and ground in the Middle East. (Hindi: Anardana अनारदाना) |
| | Poppy seed | Very popular in West Bengal known posto, with no of Bengali cuisine, most popular Allu Posto (Hindi: Khas khas खसखस) |
| | Pandanus (Screwpine) | (Hindi: Pulao Patti पुलाव पत्ति/ Annapoorna Pattiyaan अन्नपूर्णा पत्तियां) |
| | Radhuni Seeds/Wild celery | It is dried fruit of Trachyspermum roxburgianum. Mostly used in Bengali Cuisine. (Hindi: Ajmod अजमोद) |
| | Red Chili Pepper | (Hindi: Lal Mirch लाल मिर्च) Bhut Jolokia (Arunachal Pradesh, Assam, Manipur, and Nagaland). Kashmiri Mirch (Kashmir). Guntur Sannam (Andhra Pradesh). Jwala Chilli (Gujarat). Byadagi (Karnataka and Tamil Nadu). Ramnad Mundu/Gundu (Tamil Nadu and Andhra Pradesh). Dhani (Manipur and Mizoram). Kanthari (Manipur, Mizoram, Tamil Nadu, and Kerala). Warangal Chappatta (Telangana). Used as Tempering Spice. |
| | Saffron pulp | Actually, safflower concentrate. (Hindi: Kusum Ras कुसुम रस or Kusum Guda कुसुम गूदा) |
| | Saffron | World's most expensive spice. Used for flavouring rice & desserts. (Hindi: Kesar केसर) |
| | Sesame seed | Black Sesame seed (Hindi: Kala Til काला तिल) White Sesame seed (Hindi: Til तिल) |
| | Star Anise | Exotic, Chinese-influenced flavours Used as Tempering Spice. (Hindi: Chakra phool चक्र फूल) |
| | Sichuan Pepper | Also known as Teppal/ Tirphal. (Hindi: Teppal तेप्पल or Tirphal तीरफल) (Marathi: Tirphal तीरफळ) |
| | Tamarind | Provides tartness in South Indian curries. (Hindi: Imli इमली) |
| | Turmeric | It is used extensively in Indian cooking. It is also often used as a colourant. It has a warm, peppery taste with musky, earthy undertones. Raw Turmeric (Hindi: Kachi Haldi कच्ची हल्दी). Dry Turmeric (Hindi: Sukhi Haldi सूखा हल्दी). Ground Turmeric (Hindi: Haldi हल्दी). |
| | Gum Tragacanth | A thickener and coating for desserts (Hindi: Gond Katira गोंद कतिरा) |
| | White Peppercorns | Mostly used in white, cream based gravies/curries. (Hindi: Safed Mirch सफ़ेद मिर्च or Dakhani Mirch दखनी मिर्च) |

== See also ==
- Spice trade
- Masala dabba, a traditional spice box
- Spice Mixes
