= Kasundi =

Bengali mustard sauce

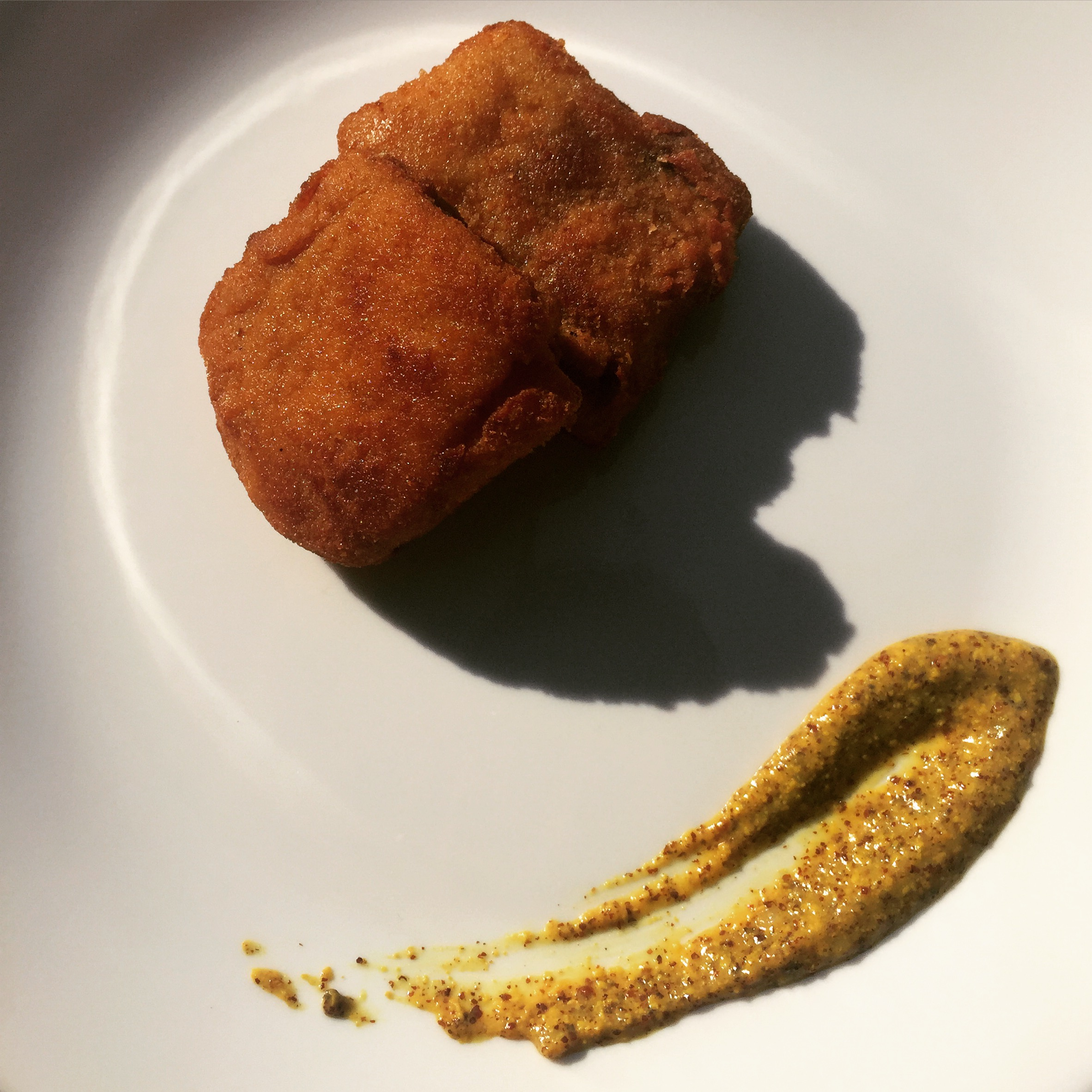
- Fish cutlet and kasundi
- Alternative names: Kashundi
- Type: Condiment
- Course: Sauce/Dip
- Place of origin: Bengal
- Region or state: Bengal
- Associated cuisine: Bengal
- Main ingredients: Mustard
- Ingredients generally used: Mustard, spices, salt
- Variations: Aubergine Kasundi, Tomato Kasundi
- Similar dishes: Dijon mustard, Creole mustard

Kasundi (Bengali: কাসুন্দি) is the Bengali variety of mustard sauce or relish. It has the pungent paste of fermented mustard seeds, spices and sometimes dried mangoes, dried Indian plum and olives. Kasundi is popular as a dipping sauce in Bengali cuisine.

== Description ==
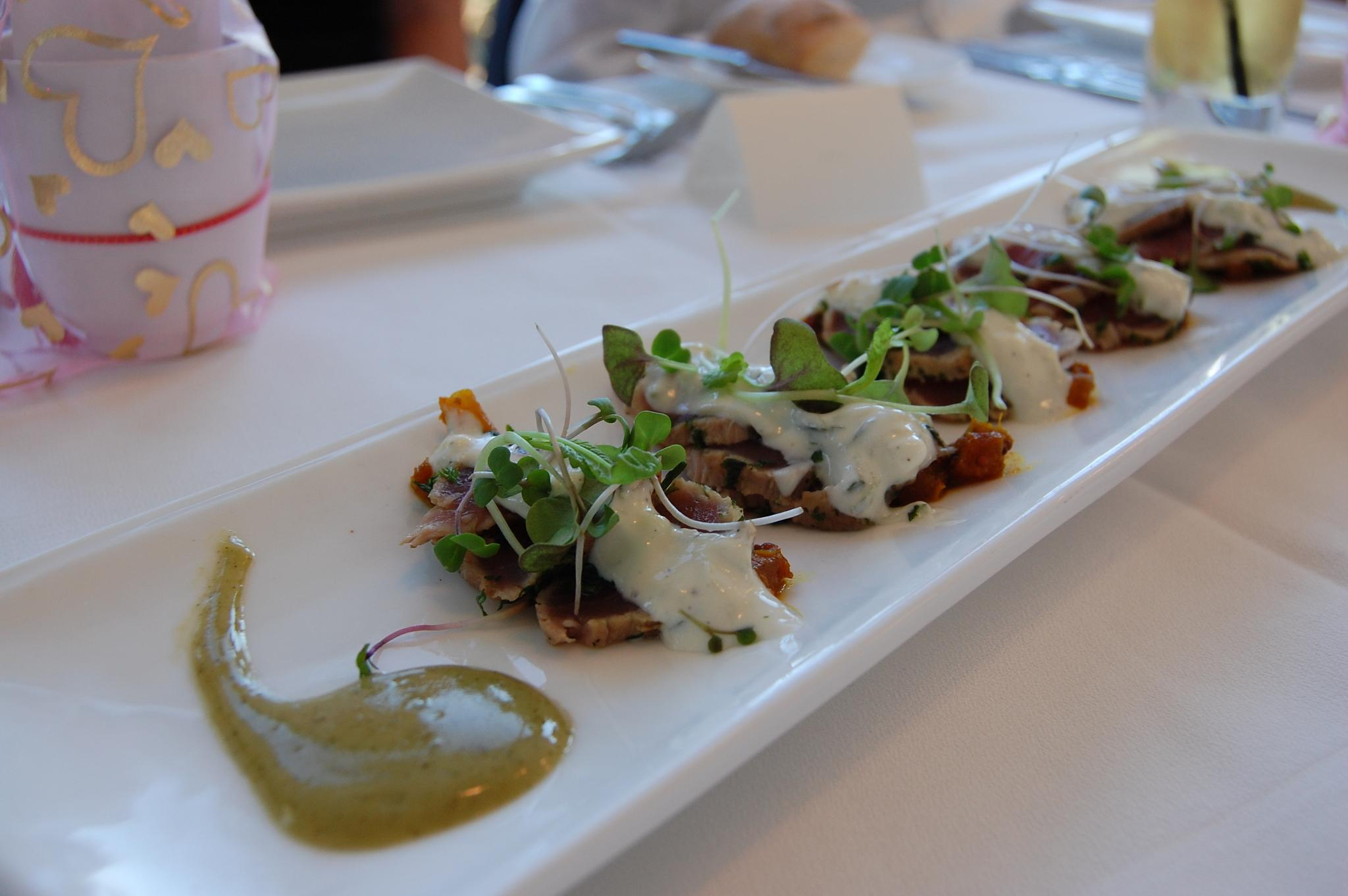
Kasundi and tuna carpaccio

Kasundi is a mustard sauce made by fermenting mustard seeds, and is much stronger and sharper than other kinds of mustard sauce. It is highly pungent, and is capable of exciting the nasal passage and bringing tears to the eyes in the same way as wasabi. The descriptions by famous chefs outside Bengal as the “answer to the ketchup”, “ketchup with a lot more going on”, or “a rich, unctuous tomato sauce of Indian origin” are based, according to food writer Pritha Sen, on mistaken notions.

In modern times, Kasundi is popularly served with Bengali snacks like cutlets and chops, and deep-fried spicy treats, as it brings tartness and pungency to the flavours. It also can be served as a dip with other snacks, as well as sandwiches, pizzas, burgers, omelettes, salads and other food. But, traditionally it was served neither with these treats nor in such quantities at home. In the past, it was stored with care, served sparingly and in small quantities, and paired with hot stir-fried greens, never fish or meat. The practice of pairing kasundi with non-vegetarian dishes evolved in the commercial eateries, beginning with batter-fried fish.

Kasundi has always been a revered fixture of Bengali households, its making used to be almost a religious rite, with many restrictions and rituals. With modern household appliances becoming commonplace, its preparation is no longer a complex ritual. It also is now industrially produced, and widely available in eateries as a sauce and supermarkets as a bottled condiment. Among the bottled kasundis, those following the recipe of Bikrampur, in undivided Bengal is reported to be the best. Kasundi has spread outside Bengal, across India and into the Pacific Ocean countries like Australia (popular as eggplant kasundi) and New Zealand (popular as tomato kasundi). In Australia and New Zealand, kasundi is often part of the Christmas gift hamper. Around the world many different recipes of kasundi are available, like Kasundi Scotch Eggs, Chilean Sea Bass, Spicy Barramundi or Chhana Aam Kasundi Paturi.

== Origin ==
Kasundi was originally used as a type of achar (literally "ritual", meaning chutney/pickle), though it was not necessarily the same sauce known today. Kasundi was the queen of pickles in Bengal, because it remained edible for up to 20 years if stored in right conditions. In the past, the Bengali pickle-making season began in the month of Magh (January–February), which also is the mustard harvesting time. Jujube (kul) were the first pickles to be made, followed by tamarind, and then mustard. Mustard was pickled before the monsoon arrived, with various indigenous fruits and greens such as coriander, pudina or amrul. The pickling of mustard followed, in preparation for the monsoons. Any pickling that was done with dry, ground mustard, with or without using mustard oil, was called a kasundi.

== Traditions ==
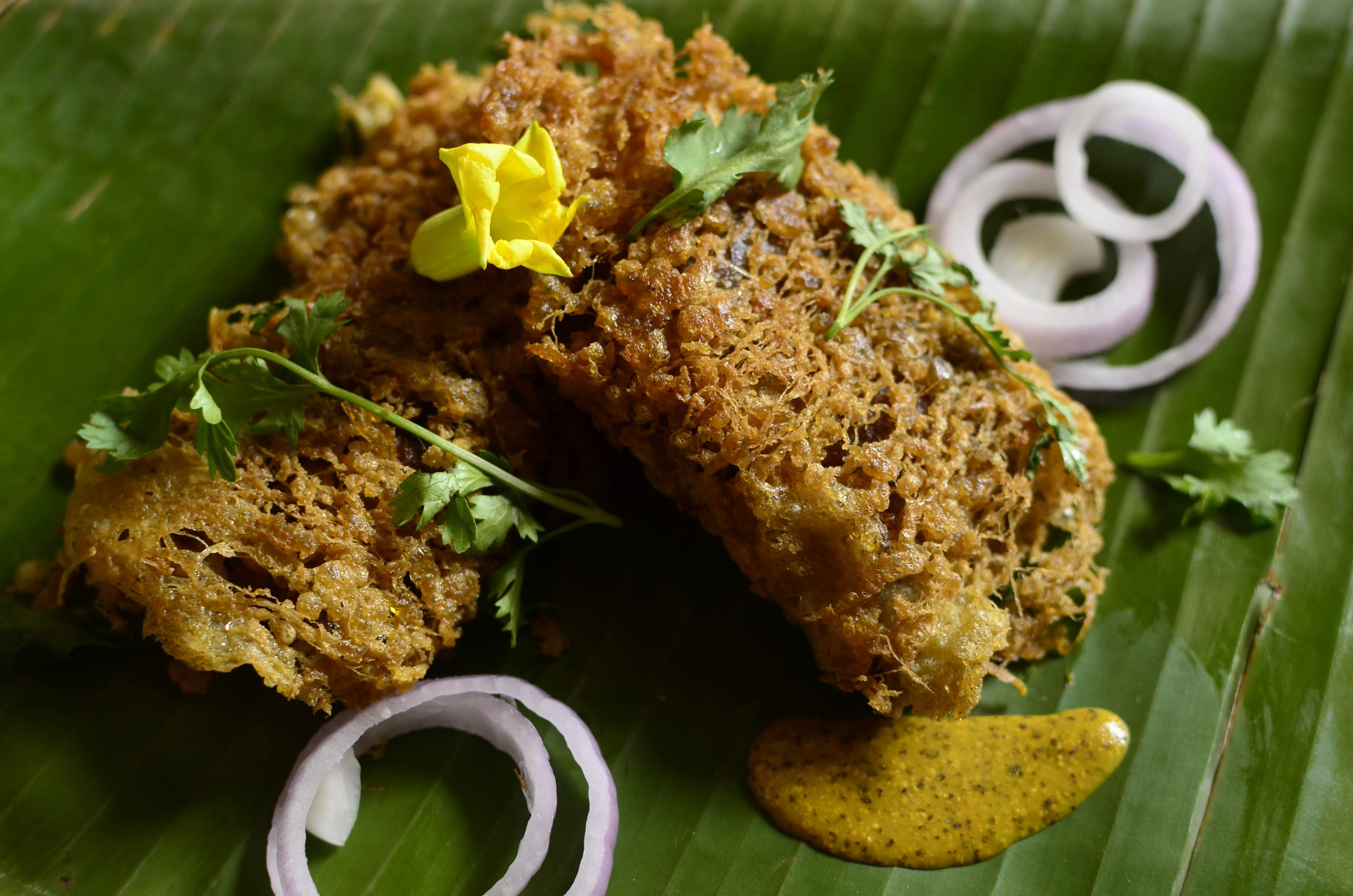
A fish Kabiraji on a plantain leaf plate served with Kasundi

Originally kasundi-making was the prerogative of the Brahmin caste and relished by the elites. Later respected families were allowed to make kasundi following auspicious rituals while maintaining a high level of hygiene and purity. It was mostly made by women who were considered appropriate, as widows, spinsters and menstruating women were barred from taking any part. Those who cleaned, husked and prepared the kasundi were not allowed to taste any bitter or sour food.

Families were forbidden to make kasundi in the month of a birth or the year of a death in the family, or if some tragedy had occurred to them in the past while making kasundi. For families who were not forbidden, failing to make kasundi in a particular year meant they would be forbidden to make any in the next 12 years. The way to avoid that was to give away mustard seeds to a Brahmin.

Renuka Devi Chaudhurani, doyenne of Bengali cuisine, wrote in her book Stree Achaar ("women's rituals") that it was mandatory that a Brahmin makes it, not the women of the household. The women were allowed only to wash, dry and pound the mustard seeds, which were then given to the Brahmins. For families that had women making it, the role of the Brahmin was still important in setting the time of kasundi making, lighting the fire to boil water for kasundi and putting the water-filled earthenware pot on the stove.

== Process and rituals ==
The long and tedious ritualistic kasundi making process used to begin on the day of Akshaya Tritiya (the day of prosperity and worship of goddess Laxmi in late April-early May). The weather of the season, after the mustard harvesting and drying season in winter, was considered optimal weather for fermentation — not too cold to delay the process, nor hot or humid enough to spoil the kasundi. It took more than a week to make kasundi. Pickle-making in Bengal had to be done in a certain chronology following the harvests. Kul-er achar (pickled Indian jujube) was made first, followed by tentul-er achar (pickled tamarind), aam-er achar (pickled mango) and finally the kasundi, right before the monsoons arrived.

Black and yellow mustard seeds were first thoroughly washed and drained. The washing of mustard seeds was endowed with ceremonial importance in many parts of Bengal, where all the mustard seeds to be consumed by the family during the coming year were washed in one go on the day of Akshaya Tritiya. Mustard processing was ceremonially prohibited after that day. Washing the mustard had its own set of rituals — groups of married women bathed in odd numbers, then washed mustard seeds facing east wearing still wet sarees. They sang and chanted for wealth, health and well-being while washing. Mustard was washed in a pond or a river, though washing it under a tap is an acceptable alternative in the modern days. For washing and straining a man's dhoti was used, not a woman's saree.

After sunning, it was sifted. The mustard was then brought back into the house amid much ululation and lit up ghee-lamps after it has been presented to the gods. Five kinds of fruits, two unripe mangoes on the same stem, betel leaf, betel nut, Bermuda grass (dhoob) and paddy were also offered to gods along with the mustard. Next the mustard was ground, often with spices, into a fine pulp. Moderation was needed when adding spice, as over-spicing could spoil the kasundi. The seeds were pounded for two to three days to take away the bitterness and introduce the pungency (jhaanjh). Meanwhile, water from the same pond or river in which it had been washed was boiled for a fairly long time in a freshly made earthenware pot. A little hot water and salt were added to make a paste, sometimes with one or two green mangoes dropped into the preparation, and paste was put in a new earthenware pot in the main house of the family by a woman of the family who had a living husband. One could touch the earthenware pots only after bathing and putting on fresh clothes.

Mustard in the sealed pot was then left to ferment for about two days in a cool place. This is the time when the flavours developed - the distinctive pungency, the subtle tang and the spicy notes of an ideal preparation. Once it had slightly fermented, the pots were opened and offered to pregnant women, who were in their third trimester, as shaadh. The ritual also involved giving the pregnant women their favourite foods, along with their elders' blessing. After that it was bottled and sunned for a few more days. If made under the right conditions, kasundi remained edible for years.

Three or four days later, on an auspicious day of the week (i.e. Monday, Wednesday, Thursday or Friday), a part of the prepared kasundi was put into a small, new earthenware pot with a spirit, a religious rite. Then the pot was covered and sanctimoniously put in a safe place in the house to be opened on the first day of the month of Asharh (June–July). On the first day of the month of Asadh, fish was prohibited for all the members of the family. On that day Goddess Parvati is worshipped as Nistarini (lit. "one who delivers from difficulties") by women of high caste Hindu families of some districts of Bengal.

== Types of kasundi ==
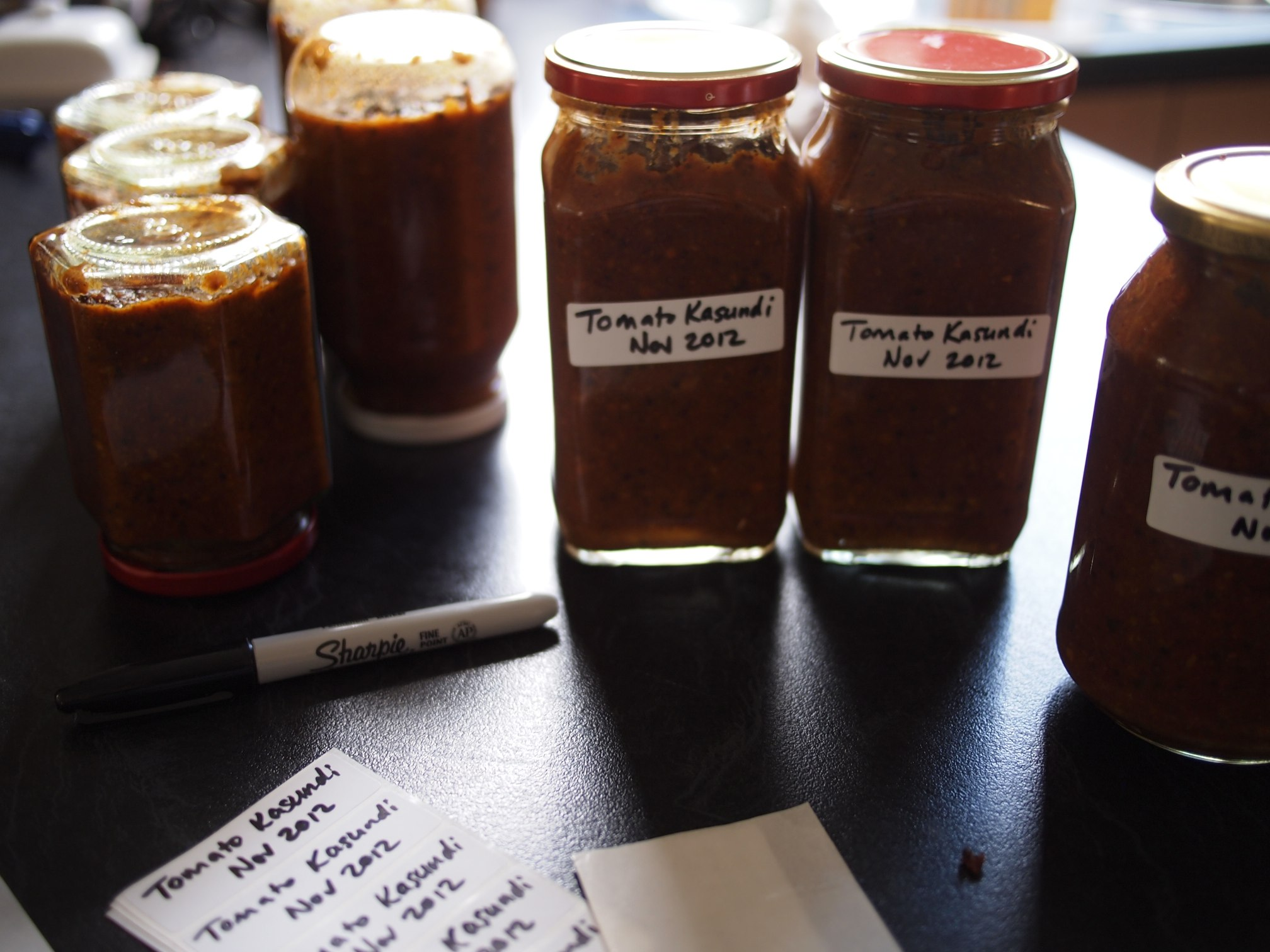
Tomato kasundi

Different households traditionally had their own unique recipe and closely guarded process of making kasundi, though the differences lie more or less in the use of spices. Some families prepared kasundi with just salt, ground mustard, dry chillies, turmeric and mustard oil. Others used combinations of different dry and ground spices like black caraway (kalonji), fennel, wild celery (radhuni shaak) seed, ajwain, long pepper (pippali), chilli, black pepper, fenugreek (methi), clove, green and black cardamom, cumin (jeera), coriander (dhonia), nutmeg (jaiphal), mace (javitri), Java pepper (kabab chini), dried mango, dried kul etc.

Chaudhurani mentions a dozen spices that were added to the kasundi, including green and black cardamom, cumin, coriander, nutmeg, mace, long pepper, chillies, black pepper and wild celery seeds. It also was made with a combination of fruits like mango, tamarind, indian jujube (kul) or hog plum (amda). The base kasundi is used to make tomato-kasundi, unripe mango-kasundi and other variations.

=== Jhal kasundi ===
The most popular variant of kasundi is the plain kasundi that is also known as Jhal Kasundi (fiery kasundi). While different homes had different recipes, the simplest one was made with dry ground mustard seeds (both black and yellow, taken from the newest crop), water, salt and haldi. The more complex recipes used to have minuscule amounts of 12 masalas &ndash. Haldi, dried red chilli, bay leaf, coriander, cumin, fennel, pepper, ginger, wild celery (randhuni), cinnamon, javitri or green cardamom and fennel flower (kalonji) – Sometimes added with a paste of green mango as a souring agent. It had to be made with strictly sanitised conditions for fear of the sauce going bad, and therefore could not be made in humid weather.

=== Phool kasundi ===
As Bengali kitchens as a principle would not let anything go to waste, the coarse pulp left behind after sieving the mustard was finely ground again and mixed with more mustard to make what is known as phool kasundi. This was also regarded as a part of the rites of making kasundi. With phool kasundi, more chilli, turmeric, green mango and salt were added to make a grainier, bolder, fuller-bodied and spicier sauce. The rest of the process was similar to regular kasundi, except in households where Brahmins made the kasundi the women of the household would make phool kasundi. Also, while kasundi was traditionally not used in cooking or served with fish or meat, phool kasundi was used to prepare shukto, the Bengali vegetable stew, and machher Jhol, the quintessential soup-like fish curry. Modern kasundi available at stores are sometimes indetified as run-down, industrial versions of phool kasundi.

=== Gota kasundi ===
Gota kasundi is made with a large number of dry spices along with dried kul or dried mangoes that were powdered and stored. It is sprinkled over cooked vegetables or saags for enhanced flavor.

=== Tomato kasundi ===
Tomato kasundi or Tamtar kasundi is typically a spicy and savory tomato and mustard chutney. It is used as a condiment and dipping sauce for foods and dishes such as paratha and naan and fried foods such as samosas and pakoras. It is also used as a spread on sandwiches and grilled meats.

=== Aam kasundi ===
Mango kasundi or aam kasundi is one of the more popular kasundi variants. It is made from mustard seeds, hot red chillies, garlic, salt, and shredded mango. Green mango (kacchi kairi) is used to make chutneys, pickles, as well as different kind of curries, daal, besides aam kasundi. Aam kasundi is enjoyed as a spread, a dip or an accompaniment with a wide range of food including sandwich, roll, burger and fritters. It is also used to marinate chicken or fish with while making curry. Aam kasundi is available in markets like regular kasundi, but doesn't taste or smell as fresh as the home-cooked varieties.

=== Eggplant kasundi ===
Eggplant kasundi is made of eggplant (brijal or aubergine), pepper, cumin, black sesame seed, mustard seed, curry leaves, lemon juice, tamarind paste, ghee, and chillies. The ingredients are simmered together until a thick sauce emerges.
