= Indian vegetarian cuisine =

Indian vegetarian thali

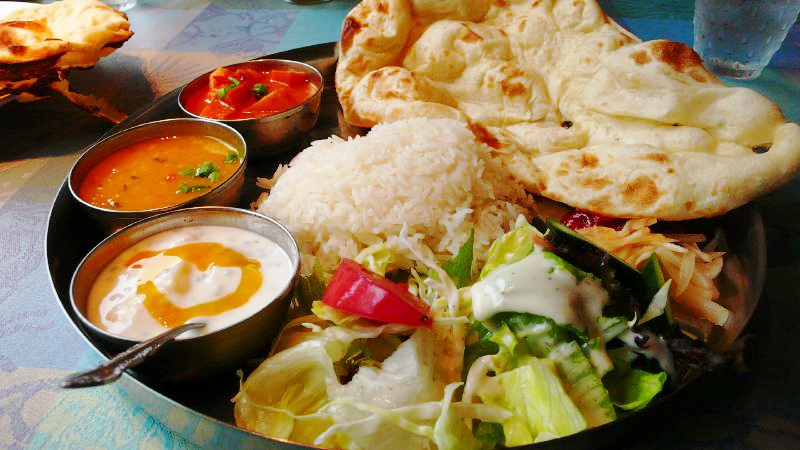
North Indian style vegetarian thali.

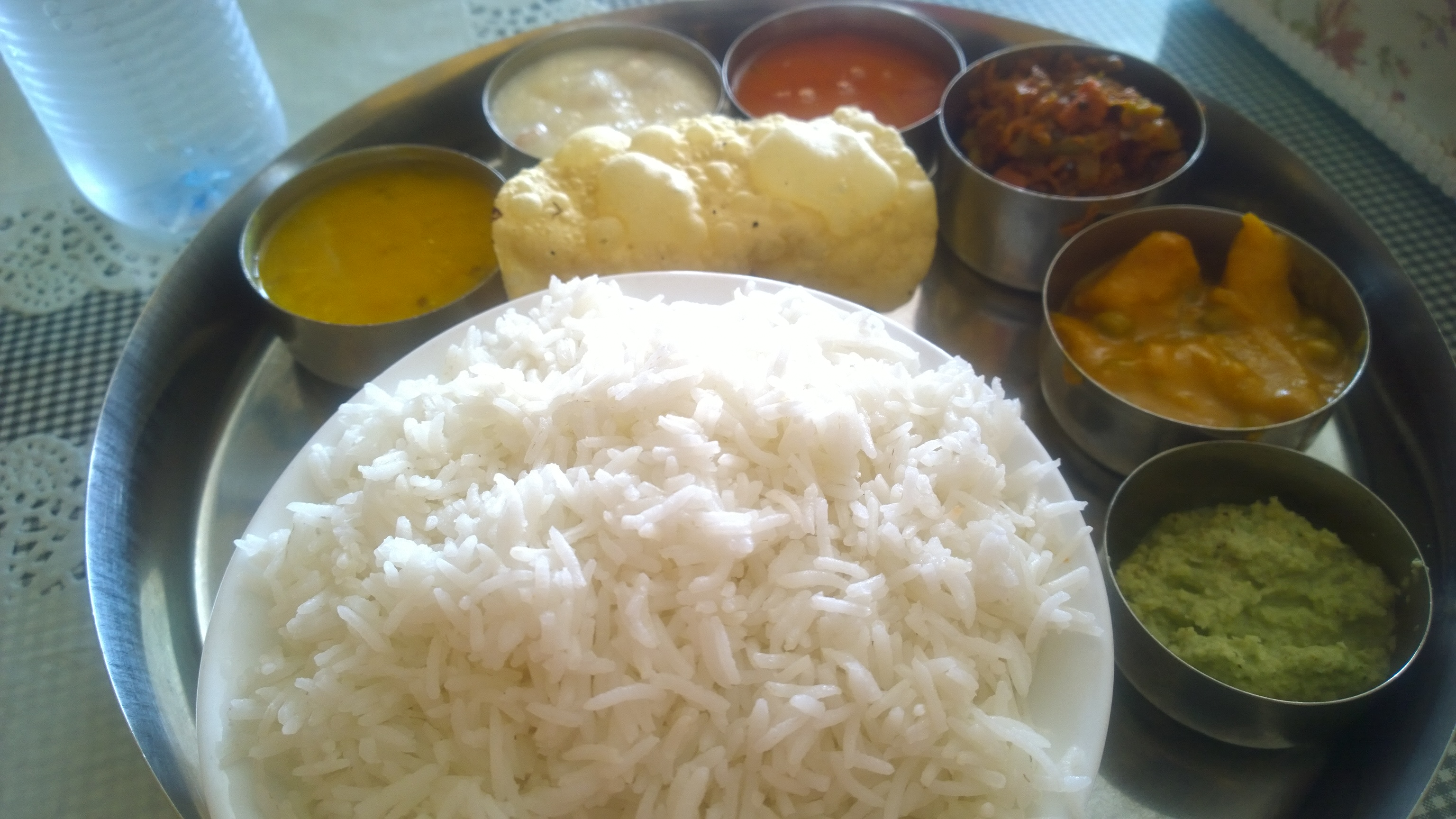
South Indian style vegetarian thali.

India has the world's largest number of vegetarians. Vegetarianism has been present in India since antiquity although a non-vegetarian diet may be present even on the highest priest caste. Many Indians who do not regularly follow a vegetarian diet may adopt one during religious festivals.

Also, many Indian vegetarians eschew eggs as well as meat. There are many vegetarian cuisines across India.

== History ==
Vegetarianism in India has deep historical and religious roots that date back millennia. Early Vedic communities (1700-1100 BCE) practiced animal sacrifices as a form of ritual worship, yet even during this period, symbolic offerings made of flour occasionally replaced animal victims, implying the early development of vegetarian values. Between the 8th and 6th centuries BCE, new religious and philosophical concepts evolved, including samsara (the cycle of rebirth) and karma (moral causation), influencing the idea that a virtuous life requires compassion towards all living beings. The principle of nonviolence, or ahimsa, became essential to ascetic and philosophical traditions, particularly those described in the Upanishads. Because of India's abundant vegetation, plant-based meals were both practical and spiritually important for hermits and renouncers who retreated from society to live simply.

The rise of Buddhism and Jainism further influenced vegetarianism. Jainism placed a high priority on ahimsa, which extended to all forms of life, whereas Buddhism encouraged moderation and discouraged the slaughter of animals for food. Emperor Ashoka (304-232 BCE) was a key historical figure who established these values by prohibiting animal sacrifices, building animal hospitals, and refraining from meat himself. Later, vegetarianism became linked to Hinduism when Brahmins accepted it as a symbol of purity and social status. Vegetarianism evolved beyond religious practice, influencing cultural identity, moral philosophy, and eventually political opinions, most notably through Mahatma Gandhi, who emphasised nonviolence and ethical vegetarianism in his teachings.

== Ingredients ==
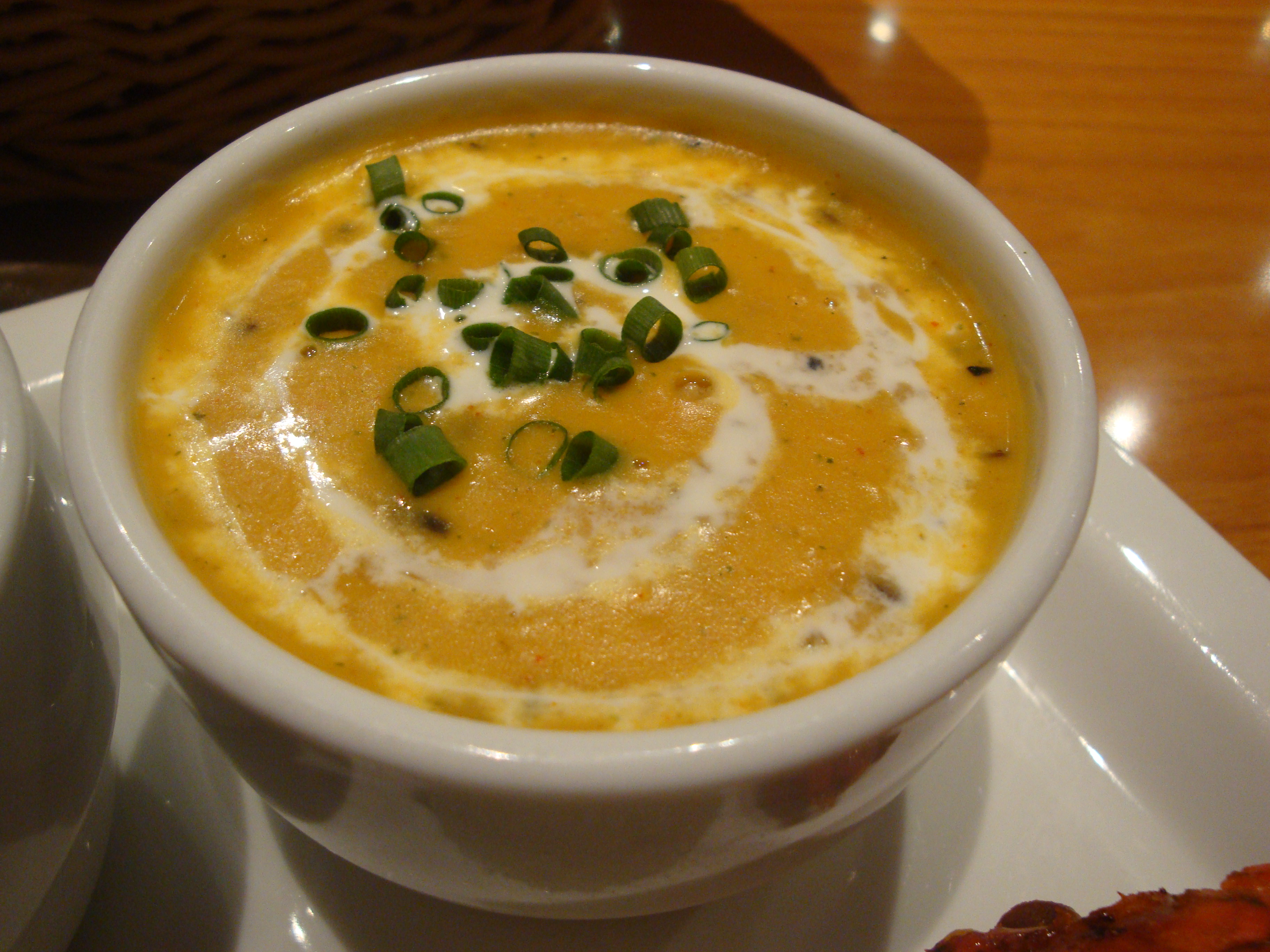
Dal, or lentil curry, is a very popular Indian vegetarian dish

Indian vegetarian cuisine uses the same everyday ingredients found throughout Indian cooking, with the main difference being the absence of meat and fish. Staples such as grains, legumes, vegetables, dairy, and spices provide a wide range of flavours and nutrients, allowing for a rich and balanced diet without animal flesh.

Pulses, including lentils, chickpeas, mung beans, and kidney beans, form the foundation of many vegetarian meals in India. They are commonly cooked into dals and served with rice or roti, providing an essential source of protein. Besan (chickpea flour) is also used to make snacks like pakoras and papads, while peas and black-eyed peas are enjoyed in everyday dishes and festive meals.

Cereal grains such as rice and wheat serve as staple ingredients across households and are central to many fermented foods. Rice forms the foundation of traditional dishes like idli, dosa, and dhokla, while wheat flour is commonly used in preparations such as jalebi, bhatura, and naan. Fermentation not only enhances flavour and texture but also improves self-life and increases nutritional value, contributing to the widespread cultural and dietary importance of these cereal-based foods throughout India.

India, known as the "Land of Spices," produces a vast variety of spices thanks to its diverse climate and rich agricultural traditions. Spices such as turmeric, cumin, coriander, fenugreek, and black pepper are essential in vegetarian cooking, adding flavor, color, and aroma while also offering medicinal and preservative benefits. Beyond enhancing taste, these spices reflect India's cultural heritage and contribute significantly to its agricultural economy.

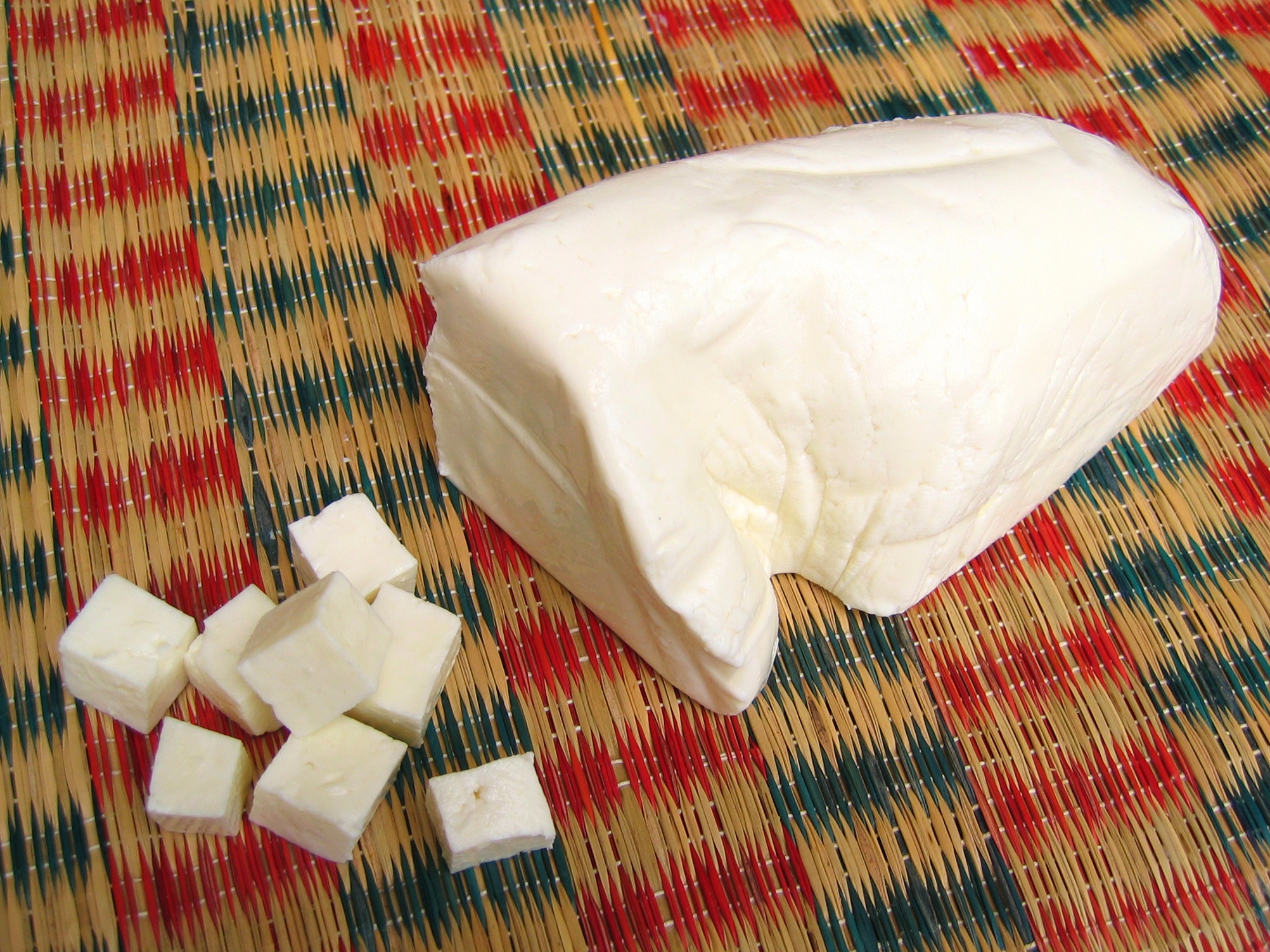
Paneer, a popular Indian fresh cheese

Dairy products are an essential part of Indian vegetarian diets, providing a major source of animal protein in an otherwise plant-based diet. India is the world's largest producer and consumer of milk, with the majority of it used to produce traditional foods including ghee (clarified butter), yoghurt (curd), flavoured milk, ice cream, and paneer (fresh cheese), which serve as nutritious and versatile meat substitutes in both everyday and festive cooking. The importance of milk and milk products has been recognised since Vedic times, and dairy remains culturally, nutritionally, and economically significant across the country.

Vegetables have always played an important role in Indian culture, influencing daily life, traditions, and spiritual beliefs. The agriculture of vegetables dates back to the Indus Valley Civilization (3300-1300 BCE), when lentils, gourds, and leafy greens were common crops. Over time, India's farming practices evolved, aided by suitable climates and profound cultural values that linked food to health and spirituality. Vegetables are revered in Ayurveda for their ability to maintain balance and wellness, while in Hinduism, Buddhism, and Jainism they represent purity and compassion. Beyond their nutritional value, vegetables represent India's connection with nature and its long-standing dedication to peaceful, sustainable living.

== Regional variations ==
North India

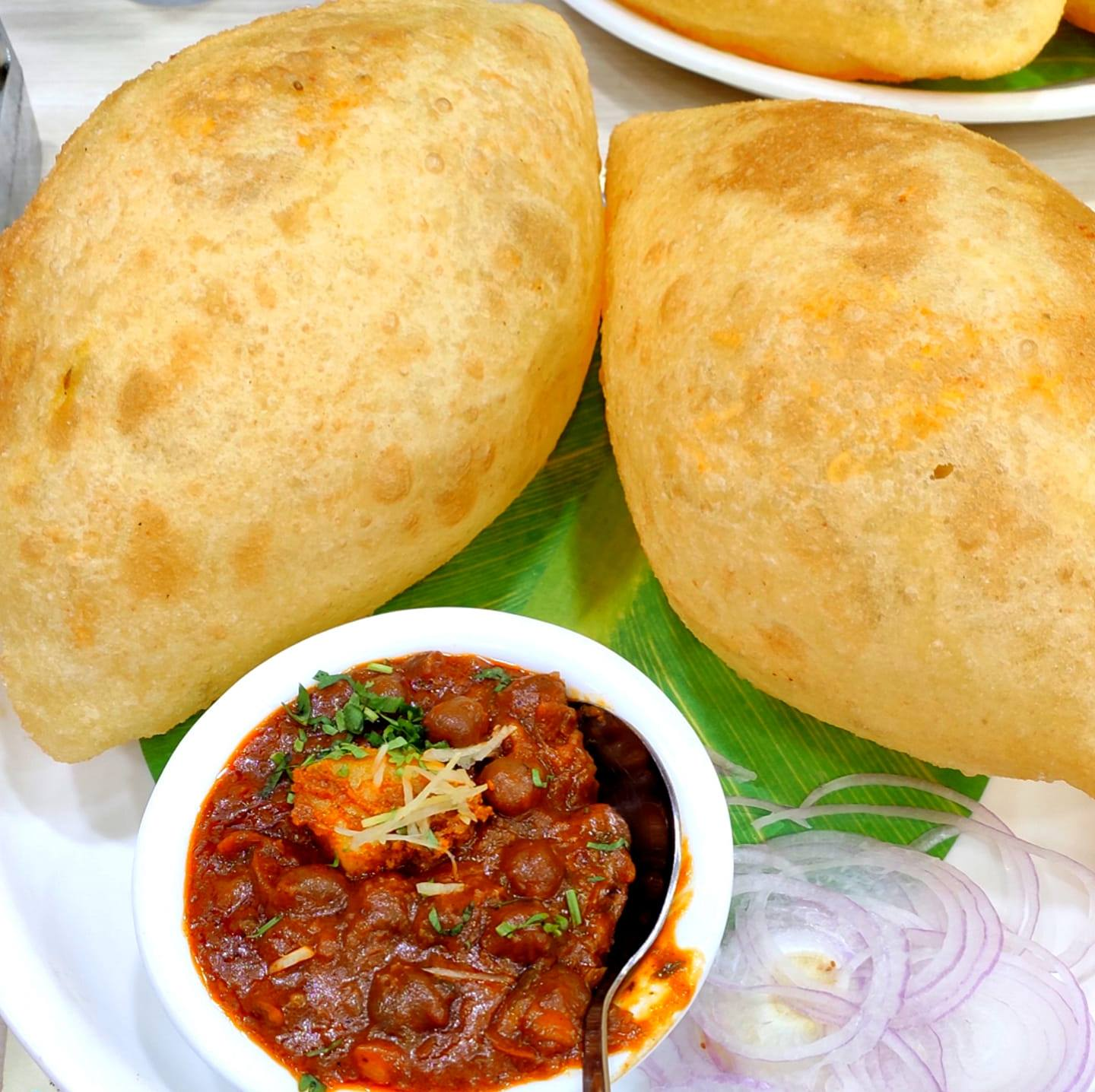
Chole Bhature

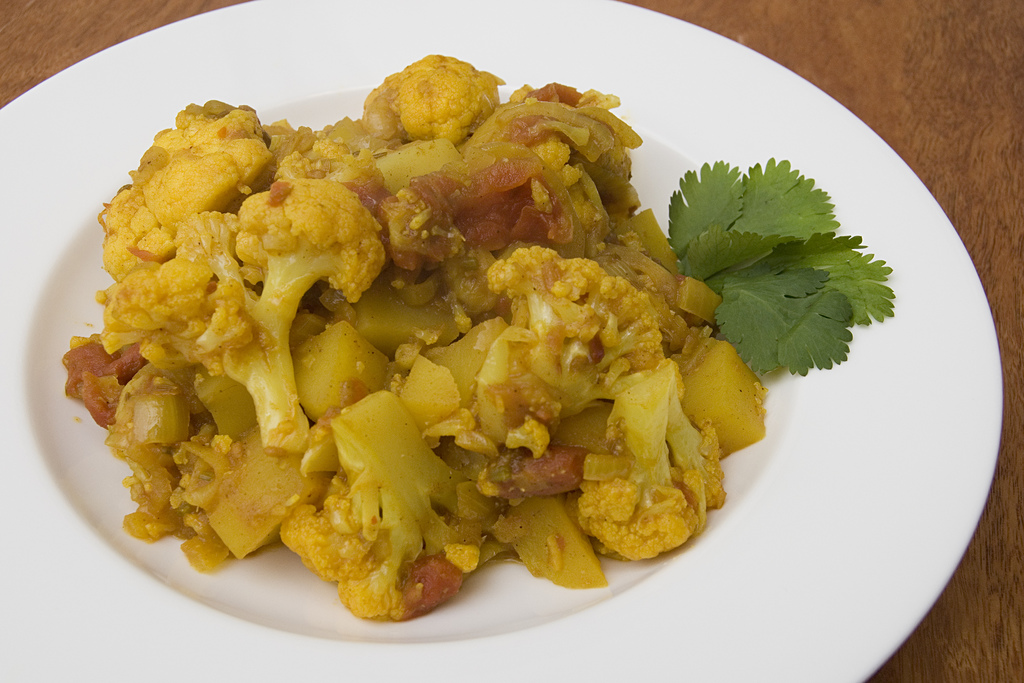
Aloo Gobhi

The diet in Northern India is primarily based on wheat, therefore breads like roti (round flatbread), naan, and paratha (stuffed flatbread) are common staples. The region's fertile plains offer a wide range of fresh fruits and vegetables, while its flavours have been influenced by Central Asian and Mughlai history. North India is well-known for its variety of dals (lentils), and curries that are often thick, creamy, and mildly spicy, featuring ingredients such as paneer, ghee, yoghurt, and nuts. These gravies are often eaten together with breads rather than rice, though fragrant biryanis and pulaos remain popular for festive meals.

Popular vegetarian dishes include chole bhature (chickpea curry and deep-fried bread), aloo gobhi (curry with potatoes and cauliflower), saag paneer and paneer tikka.

South India

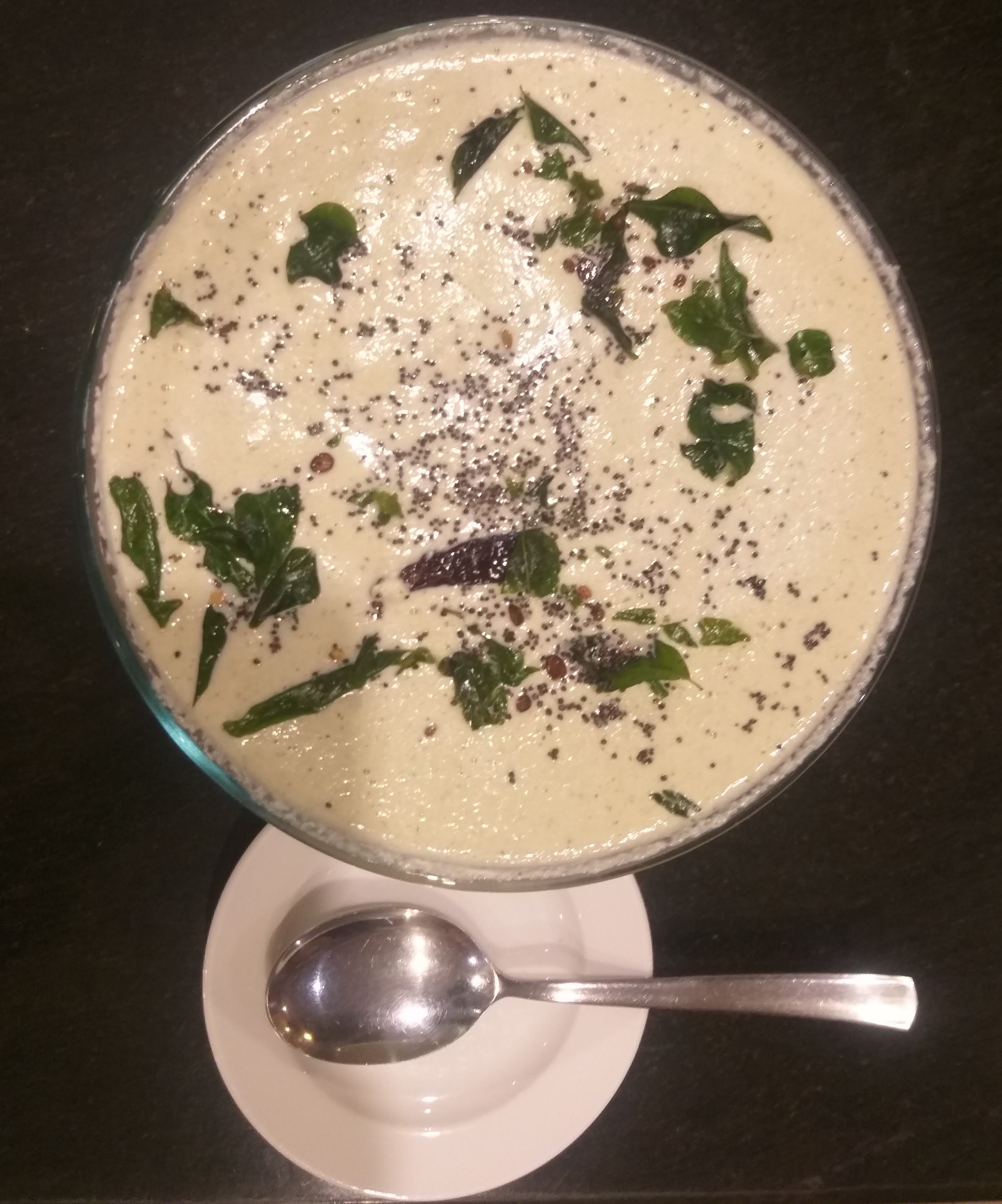
Coconut Chutney

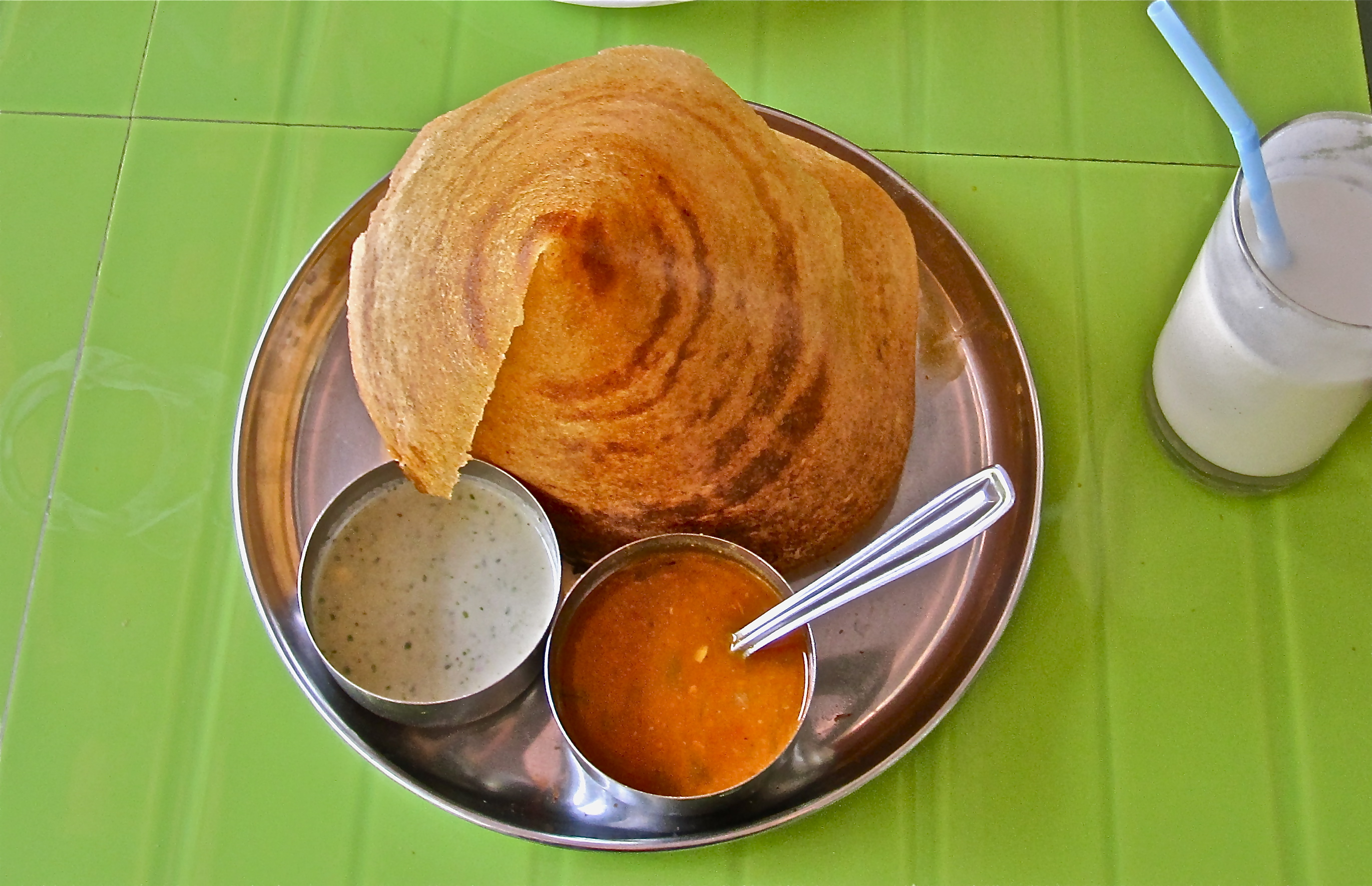
Masala Dosa with Chutney

In Southern India, the vegetarian diet is centred around rice and lentils. The coastal geography promotes the use of coconut, tamarind, and curry leaves for flavour, while locally cultivated spices like pepper, coriander, cumin, and fenugreek provide the food's distinct heat and aroma. Because the states of southern India produce an abundance of spices, South Indian cuisine is generally the hottest of all Indian cuisines.

Popular vegetarian dishes include sambar, avial, coconut chutney, idli (steamed rice cakes) and dosa (crispy rice crepes).

East India

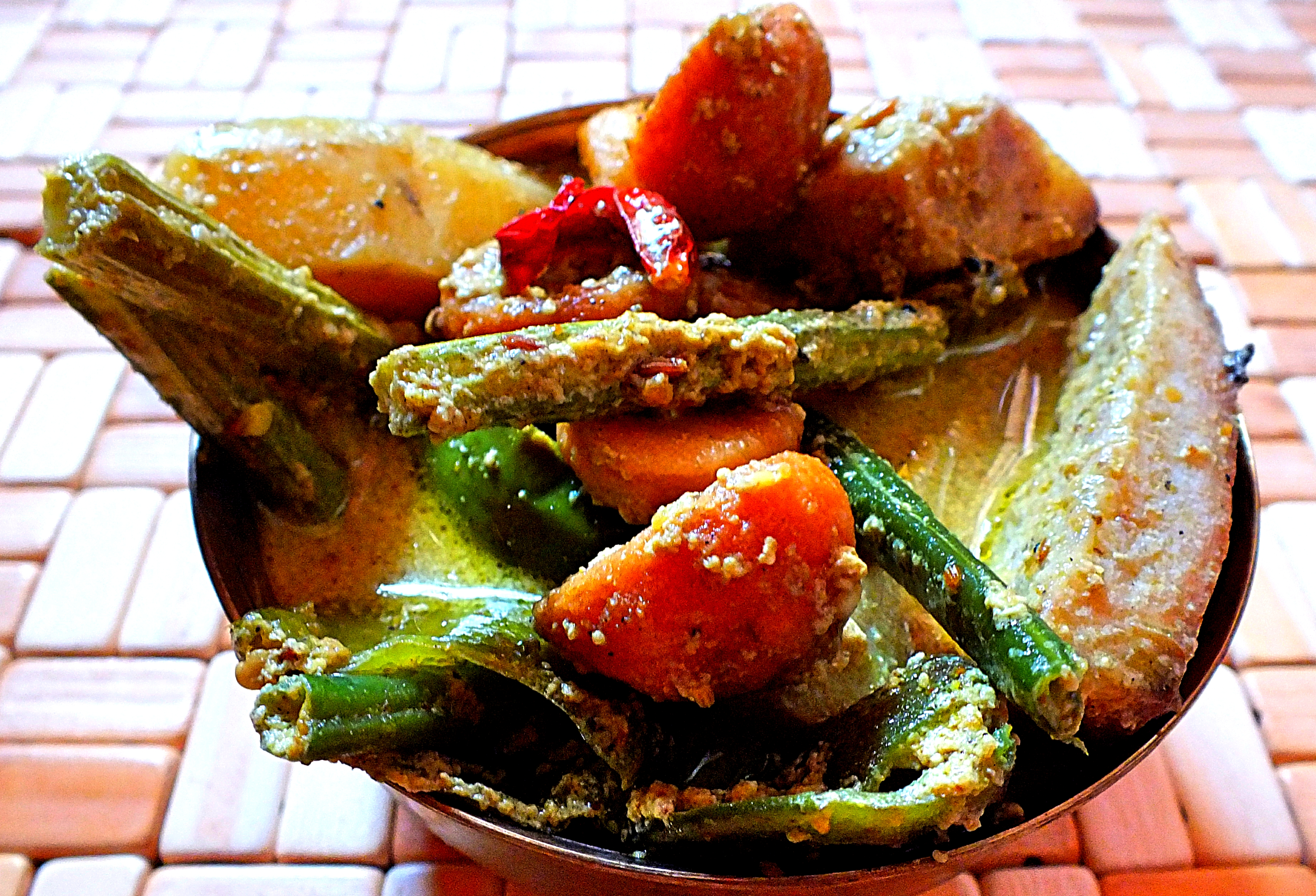
Shukto

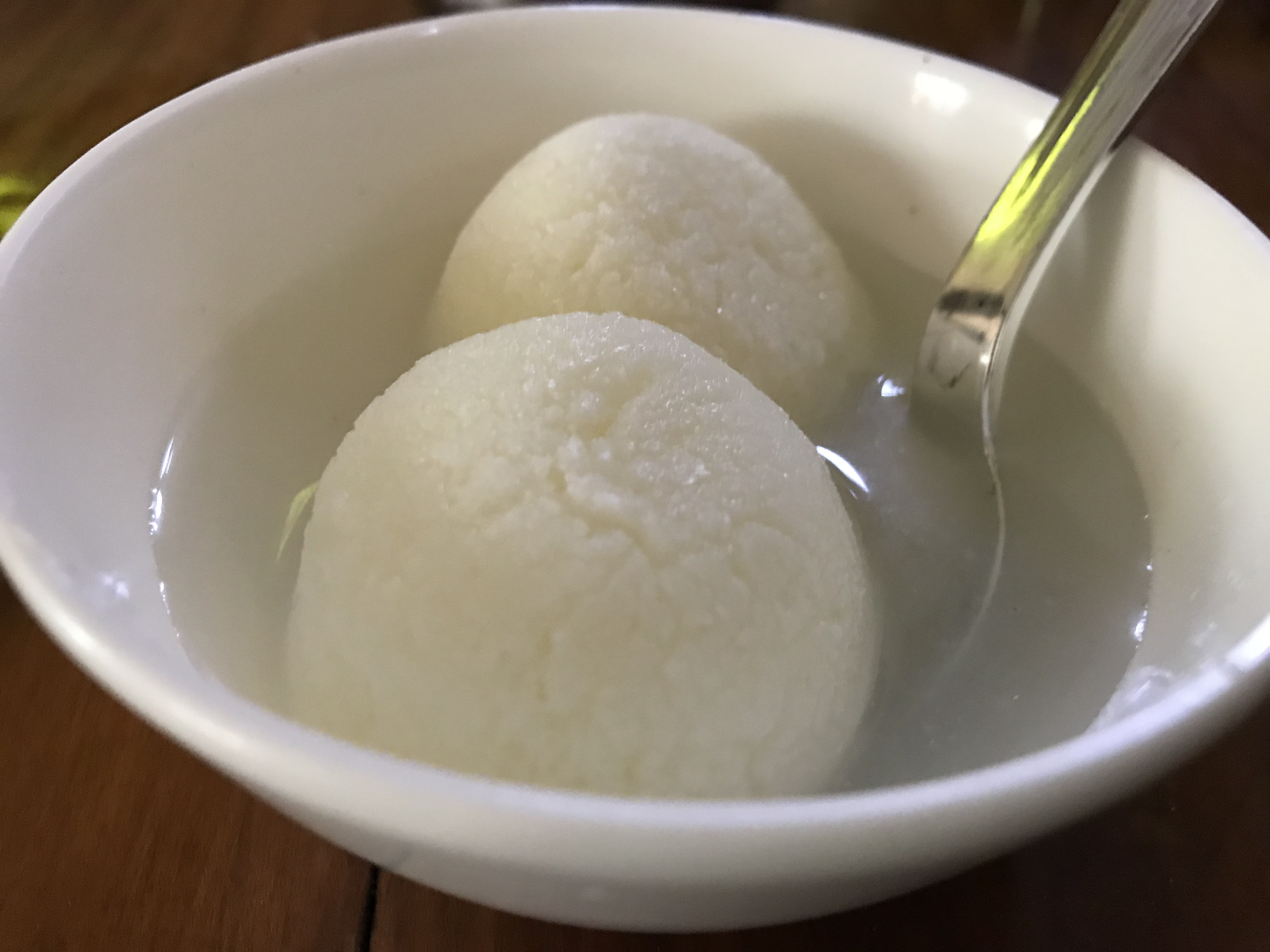
Rosogolla

The Eastern region is home to beaches, mountains, and Cherrapunji, a city with high amounts of rainfall. Because of the climate, the soil is very fertile and its widespread agriculture produces a lot of rice and an abundance of fruits and vegetables. Other popular ingredients include mustard seeds and paste and chilies. Milk and dairy products are also crucial for preparing sweets. Because of its geographic position, this region's cuisine is heavily influenced by Chinese and Mongolian cuisine. There are many popular vegetarian dishes such as shorshe bata diye bhindi (okra in mustard sauce) and shukto (bitter vegetable stew).

The Eastern region is renowned for its sugary treats such as mishti doi (sweet yoghurt) and nolen gur rosogolla (dumplings dipped in date palm jaggery syrup).

West India

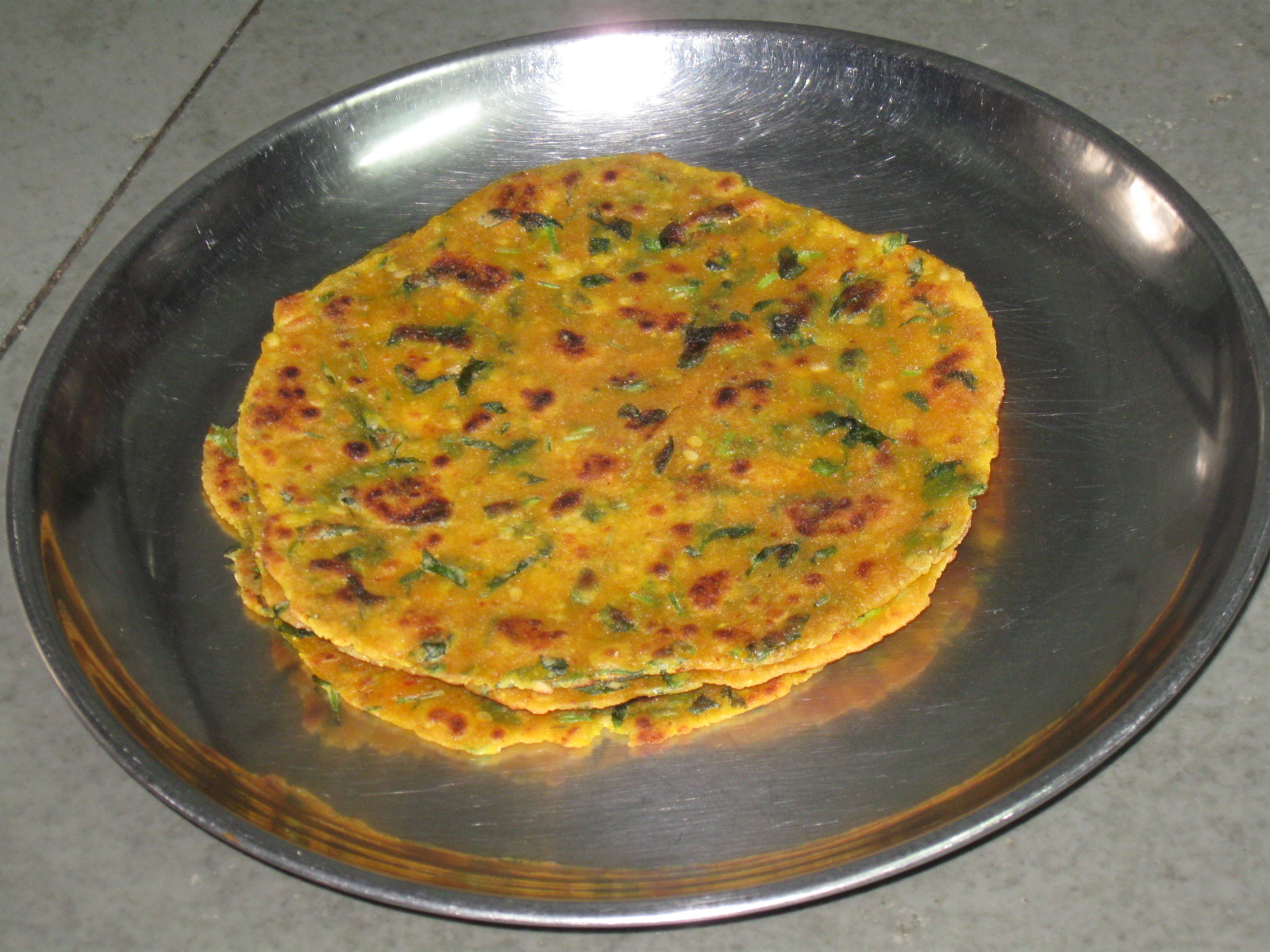
Thepla

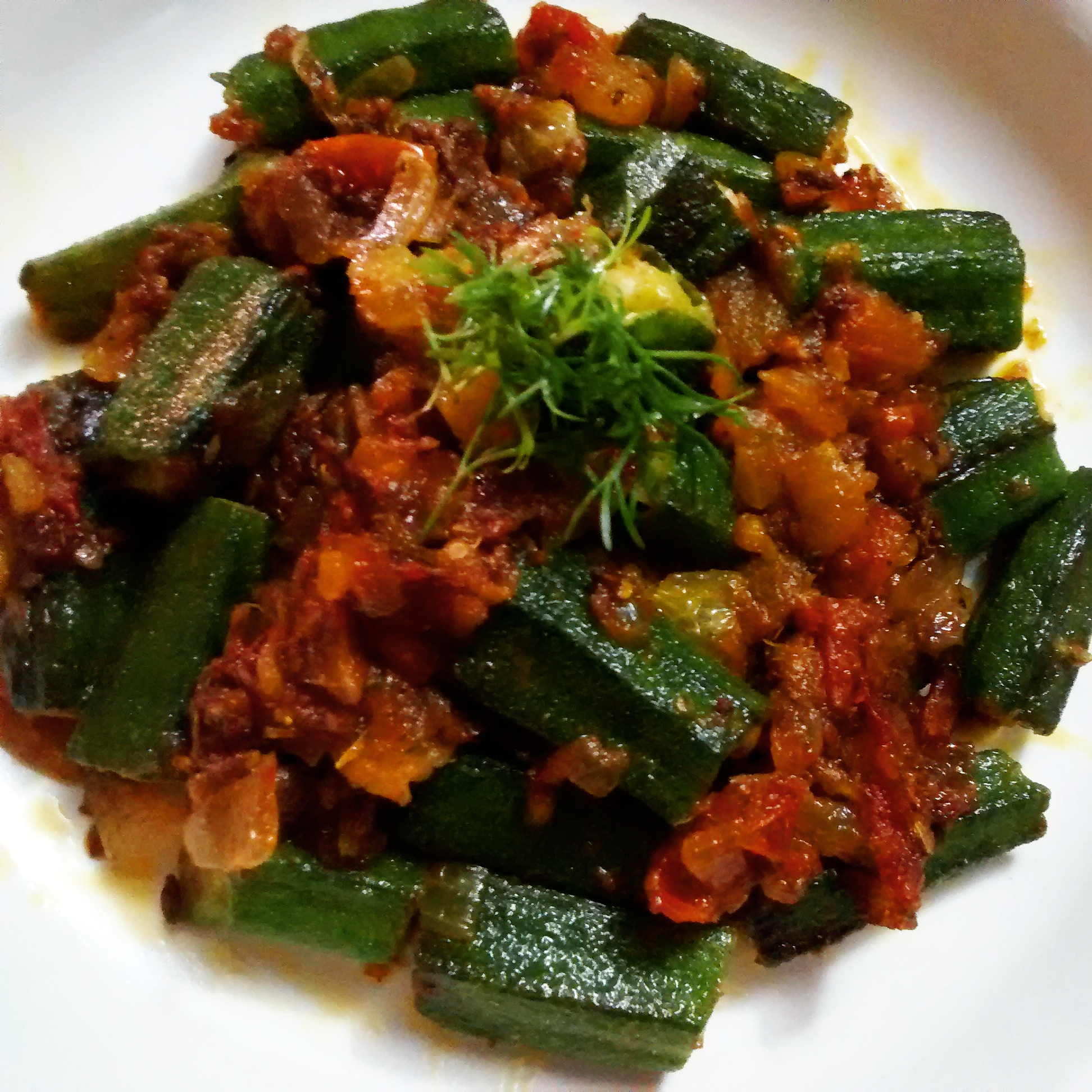
Bhindi Masala

In the dryer climates of West India (such as Gujarat and Rajasthan), which have a more limited selection of vegetables, it is common to preserve vegetables as pickles and chutneys. Staple foods include corn, lentils, gram flour, dry red chilies, buttermilk, yoghurt, sugar, and nuts, and popular dishes include dhokla, khandvi, and thepla. As for the more coastal areas of West India, staple foods include rice, coconut and peanuts, with popular vegetarian dishes such as pav bhaji (spicy vegetable mash with bread) and bhindi masala (okra curry).

== Influence ==
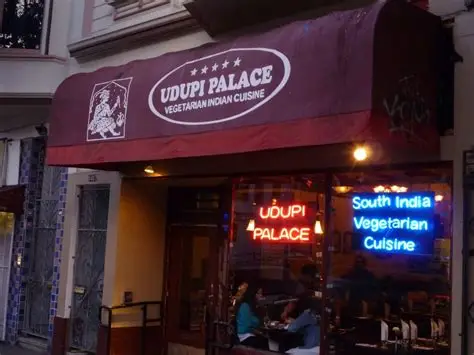
An Udupi restaurant in San Francisco

Indian vegetarianism has influenced worldwide dietary preferences, especially through the international rise of South Indian restaurants. The Udupi cuisine, which originated in temple food in the town of Udupi, Karnataka, has served as a key means for this influence. The restaurants were established by Brahmin cooks who served vegetarian meals to temple pilgrims while adhering to Hindu dietary regulations by avoiding items like onion and garlic. Beginning in the 1920s, some of these chefs founded local restaurants before expanding throughout India and worldwide.

Woodlands, Dasaprakash, and Saravanaa Bhavan were renowned Udupi restaurant chains that helped promote South Indian vegetarian foods such as idli, dosa, sambar, and coconut chutney in large cities such as New York and Chicago. For many foreign diners, these eateries provided an introduction to Indian vegetarian cuisine and its regional variations.

In addition to restaurant culture, Indian vegetarian street food has achieved international recognition. Chaat, a dish made of fried flatbread, potatoes, yoghurt, chutneys, and spices, is popping up on food carts, catering menus, and in contemporary Indian restaurants outside of India. These developments demonstrate how Indian vegetarian traditions have influenced the global demand for meatless cuisine.

== Air catering ==
On demand most airlines offer Indian vegetarian dishes. Some regard these as dietary meals, some as religious meals. Details may vary.

Pre-ordering the IATA meal code AVML (Asian vegetarian meal) usually results in a meal without meat, poultry, fish, seafood, and eggs. Ingredients can be vegetables, legumes, fresh and dried fruit, dairy products, tofu, cereal, grains, vegetarian gelatine, spices and aromas associated with the Indian sub-continent. The meal can be spiced mildly to hot.

Another option is to pre-order the code VJML (Vegetarian Jain Meal). Compared to AVML only vegetables that grow above the ground are accepted, so onions, garlic, potatoes, carrots, beets, radishes, mushrooms, ginger and turmeric are excluded. No dairy products are used.

== List of notable dishes ==
Name	Image	Description
Paneer Tikka		This dish is made by marinating paneer in spiced yoghurt which is then arranged on skewers and grilled.
Dhokla		Originating from Gujarat, this dish is a steamed savoury cake with a spongy texture, often made from rice, lentils and gram flour.
Pav Bhaji		This dish from Mumbai consists of bread rolls (pav) served together with a vegetable curry cooked in tomato gravy.
Chole Bhature		It is a dish that pairs chickpea curry (chole) with deep-fried bread (bhature).
Dahi Vada		A popular North Indian street food made from deep-fried dumplings (vada) covered in yoghurt (dahi).
Dal tadka		It is a North Indian lentil dish seasoned with plenty of aromatic spices and herbs.
Dum Aloo		A traditional Kashmir dish of potato-based curry made from fried potatoes simmered in tomato gravy.
Misal Pav		Originating from Maharashtra, it is a meal consisting of sprout curry served with bread rolls (pav), farsan and chopped onions.
Mishti Doi		A traditional Bengali dessert made from fermenting sweetened milk in earthenware pots.
Pulihora		A popular South Indian rice dish, besides rice, it also consists of tamarind, curry leaves, coriander, ginger, green chillis and turmeric which gives it its yellow colour.

== See also ==
- Indian cuisine
- List of Indian sweets and desserts
- Vegetarian cuisine
- Marwari Bhojanalaya
