= Psammogeton =

Scientific classification
- Kingdom: Plantae
- Clade: Tracheophytes
- Clade: Angiosperms
- Clade: Eudicots
- Clade: Asterids
- Order: Apiales
- Family: Apiaceae
- Subfamily: Apioideae
- Tribe: Pimpinelleae
- Genus: Psammogeton; Edgew.

Genus of plants

Psammogeton is a genus of flowering plants belonging to the family Apiaceae.

Its native range is Iraq to Central Asia and India, Eastern Arabian Peninsula.

Species:

- Psammogeton anethifolius (D.Don) Mousavi, Mozaff. & Zarre
- Psammogeton biternatus Edgew.
- Psammogeton cabulicus (Wagenitz) Nasir
- Psammogeton canescens (DC. ex Boiss.) Vatke
- Psammogeton capillifolius (Regel & Schmalh.) Mousavi, Mozaff. & Zarre
- Psammogeton diffusus (Roxb. ex Sm.) Rech.f. ex Pimenov
- Psammogeton hirsutus Bhellum & Magotra
- Psammogeton involucratus (Roxb.) Mousavi, Mozaff. & Zarre
- Psammogeton lamondiae Engstrand & Rech.f.
- Psammogeton microcarpus (Hedge, Lamond & Rech.f.) Mousavi, Mozaff. & Zarre
- Psammogeton paktianus (Hedge, Lamond & Rech.f.) Mousavi, Mozaff. & Zarre
- Psammogeton papillaris (Boiss.) Mousavi, Mozaff. & Zarre
- Psammogeton ranunculifolius (Boiss.) Engstrand
- Psammogeton registanicus Rech.f.
- Psammogeton shivalikensis Bhellum & Magotra
- Psammogeton stocksii (Boiss.) Nasir
- Psammogeton suchaniensis Bhellum & Magotra
- Psammogeton ternatus (Rech.f.) Engstrand
