= Thadal =

Cooling and energizing drink

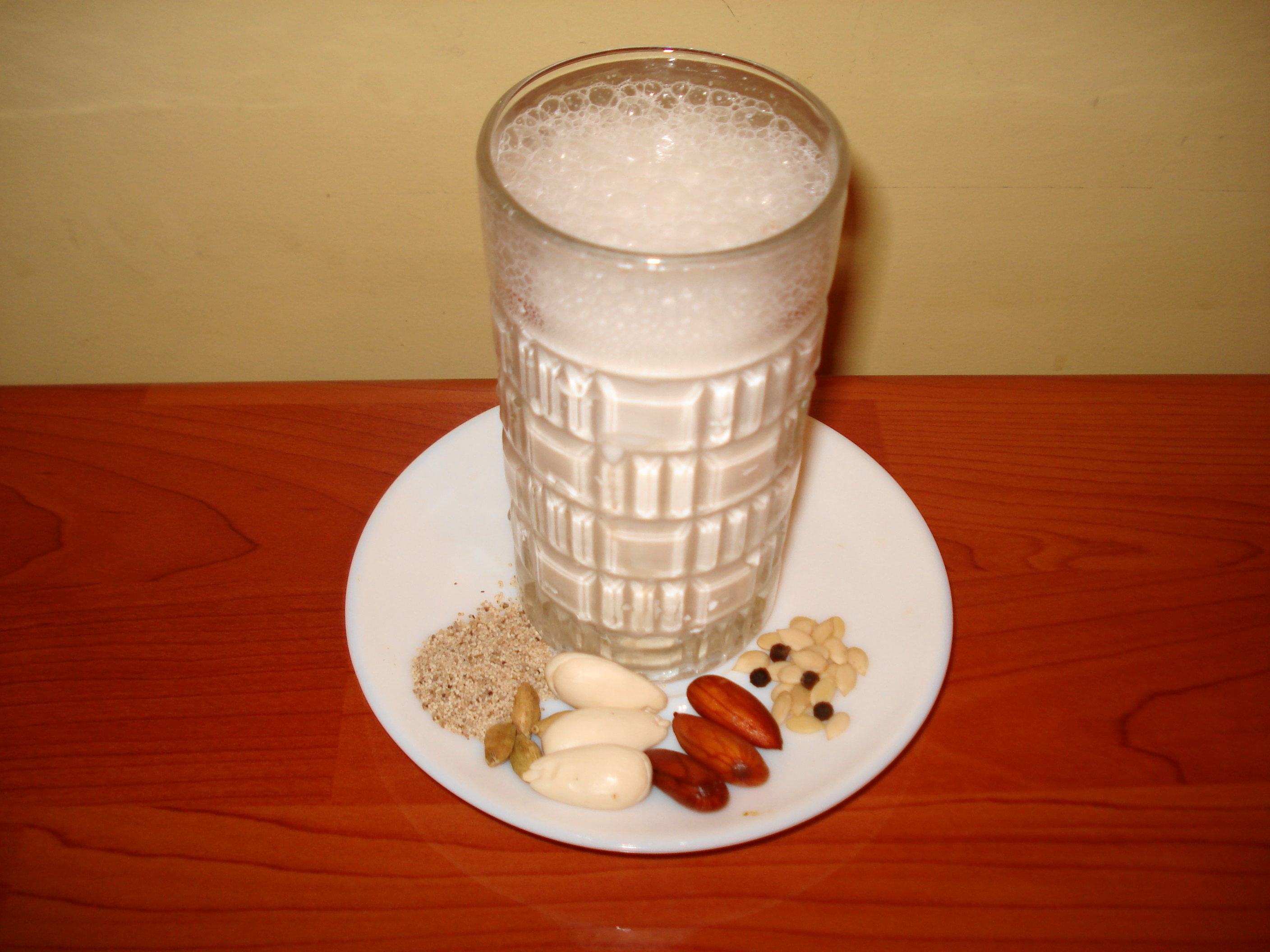
Sindhi Thadal drink.

Thadal (Sindhi: ٿاڌل) is a cooling and energizing drink popular with the people of the Sindh province in Pakistan, in particular the pehlwan—practitioners of pehlwani, a form of wrestling local to the area. The drink is believed to keep the wrestler's liver cool during fights and exercises. The drink is prepared using ground char magaz (a blend of melon seeds, namely pumpkin, cantaloupe, watermelon and cucumber seeds), dry fruits, pepper and almonds.

== See also ==
- Pehlwani
- Wrestling
- Pehlivan
