= Tempering (spices) =

South Asian cooking technique

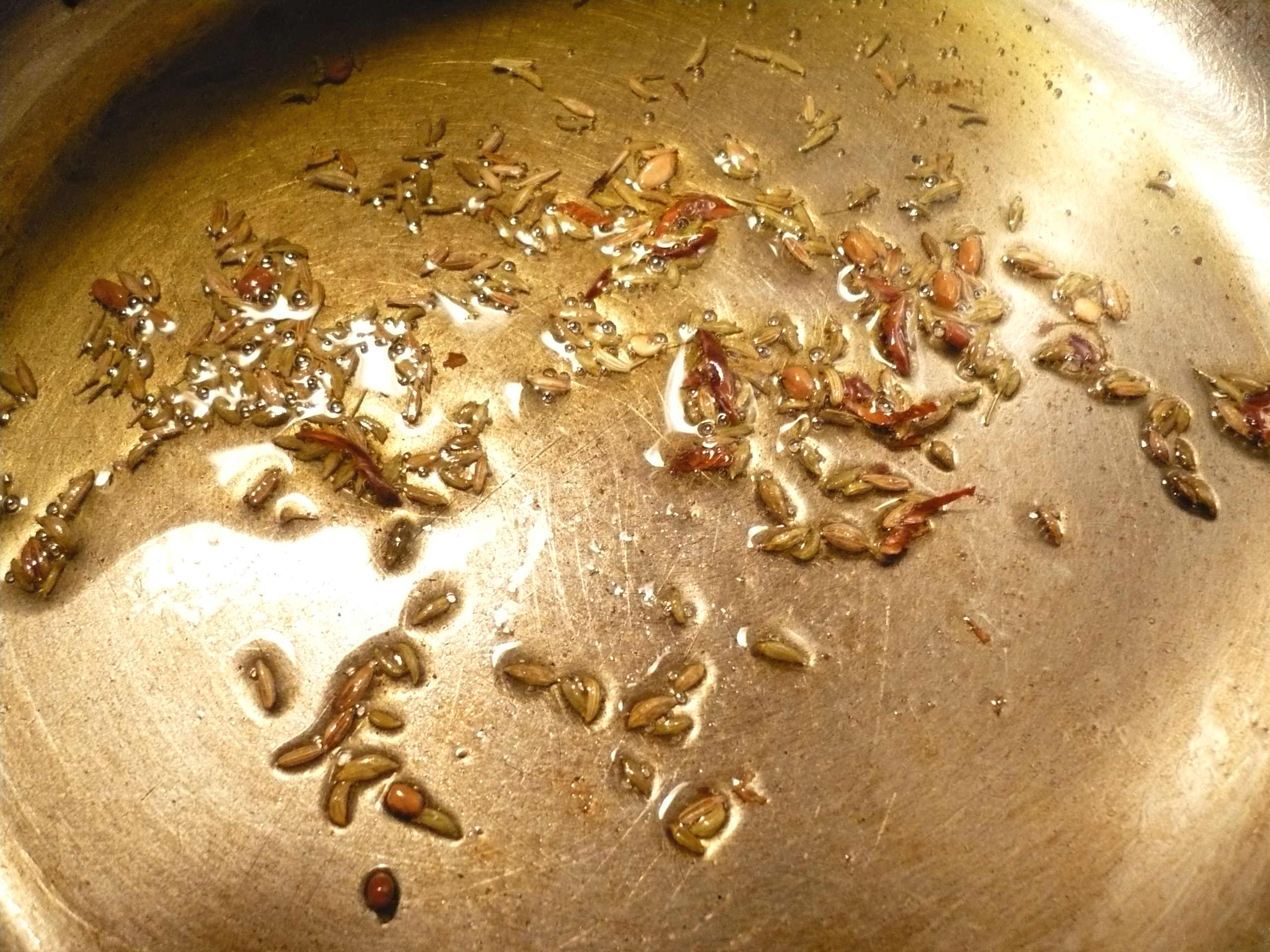
Olive oil, fennel seeds, cumin seeds, fenugreek seeds, and slivered dried red chili peppers being prepared in a saucepan

Tempering is a cooking technique used in India, Bangladesh, Nepal, Pakistan, Sri Lanka and the Caribbean in which whole spices (and sometimes also other ingredients such as dried chillies, minced ginger root or sugar) are cooked briefly in oil or ghee to liberate essential oils from cells and thus enhance their flavours, before being poured, together with the oil, into a dish. Tempering is also practiced by dry-roasting whole spices in a pan before grinding the spices. Tempering is typically done at the beginning of cooking, before adding the other ingredients for a curry or similar dish, or it may be done at the end for adding to a dish just before serving (as with a dal, sambar or stew).

== Ingredients ==
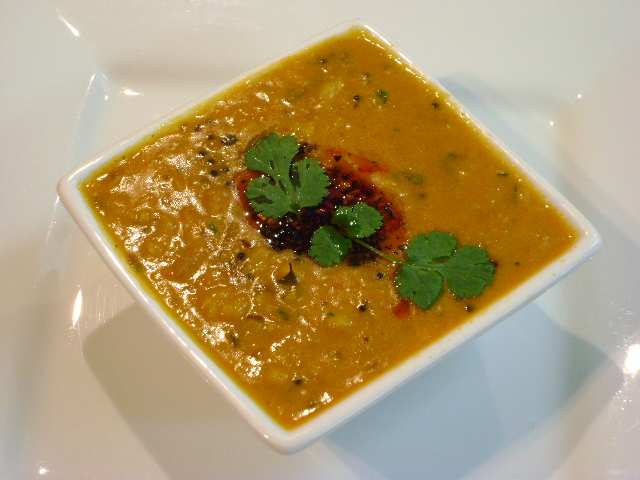
A tadka dal, which includes chaunk

Ingredients typically used in tempering include cumin seeds, black mustard seeds, fennel seeds, kalonji (nigella seeds), fresh green chilis, dried red chilis, fenugreek seeds, asafoetida, cassia, cloves, urad dal, curry leaves, chopped onion, garlic, or tejpat leaves. When using multiple ingredients in tempering, they are often added in succession, with those requiring longer cooking added earlier, and those requiring less cooking added later. In Oriya cuisine and Bengali cuisine, mixtures of whole spices called pancha phutaṇa or panch phoron, respectively, are used for this purpose.

== Terminology ==
Some Indo-Aryan and Dravidian languages use a form inherited from the Sanskrit root vyághāra- "sprinkling over", as in baghār (बघार) in Hindi. Some Indo-Aryan languages use a form inherited from the Sanskrit root sphōṭana- "crackling, cracking", as in phoran (फोरन) in Bhojpuri. Some Indo-Aryan languages use a form inherited from the Sanskrit root traṭatkāra- "crackles, splits, fizzes", as in taṛkā (तड़का) in Hindi or tuṛkā (तुड़का) in Garhwali. Another root beginning with an aspirated affricate is čhaunk (छौंक) in Hindi.

== Similar techniques ==
In parts of the Arab world; similar tempering techniques include adha or qadha (Arabic: قدحة, romanized: qadḥah, lit. 'pouring') in Palestinian Arabic, and tasha (Arabic: طشة) or taqliya (Arabic: تقلية, lit. 'to fry') in Egyptian Arabic, which involve frying garlic and sometimes spices (typically coriander) in samneh or olive oil before being added to dishes, most often stews like mulukhiyah.

== In pop culture ==
Indian music band Bloodywood's 2025 single Tadka directly references tadka; the band described the single as a tribute to Indian food.

== See also ==
- Sofrito
- Mirepoix (cuisine)
- Holy trinity (cooking)
- List of cooking techniques
- Sautéing
