= Char magaz =

Mixture of melon seeds

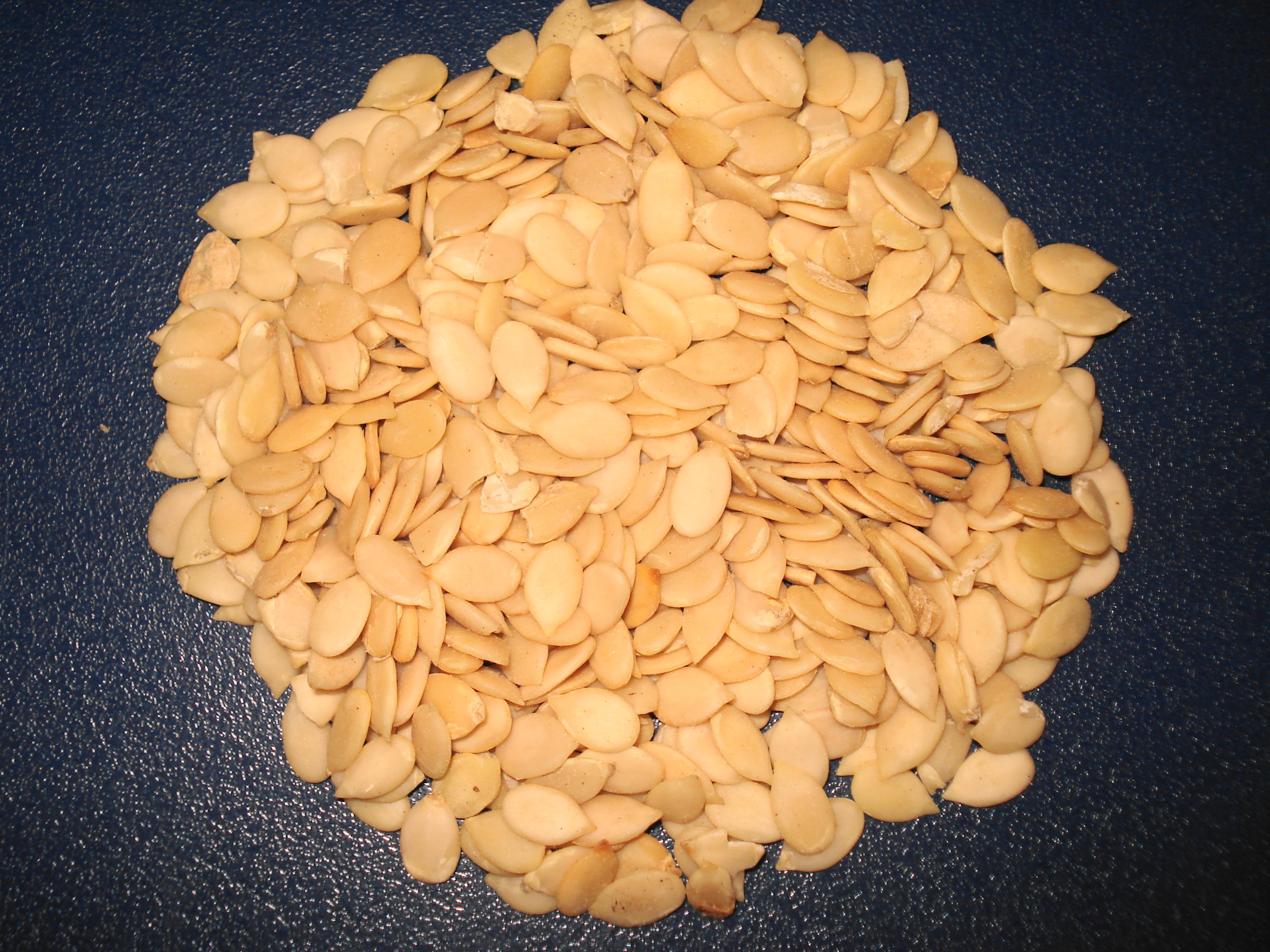
- Alternative names: charmagaz
- Type: seed mixture
- Associated cuisine: Indian, Pakistani
- Main ingredients: cantaloupe seeds; cucumber seeds; pumpkin seeds; watermelon seeds

Char magaz or charmagaz is a mixture of the seeds of four different melons: cantaloupe, cucumber, pumpkin, and watermelon. The seeds are mixed in equal proportions. Visually, all these seeds are cream-colored and roughly oval. The blend is often ground to a paste to thicken dishes and add a nutty creaminess.

The name char magaz (चार मगज) originated in Hindi; char means 'four' and magaz can be translated as 'brain', used here in the sense of pith, pulp, or kernel. Magaz can also be translated as 'melon seed', though the more common word for 'seed' is bij (बीज).

For some taxation purposes, charmagaz has been treated similarly to pistachio, walnut, and apricot kernels rather than to other nuts. It is sometimes explicitly called a mixture of spices.

The mixture has a mild flavour, similar to sunflower seeds or pumpkin seeds, and does not have much of a scent. The seeds are often lightly fried or toasted before incorporating into dishes, frequently after blending them into a paste.

The blend is popular in India and Pakistan. In Rajasthan, almonds sometimes replace cucumber seeds.

Char magaz is used in many smoothies and cooling beverages such as sardie, and is a main ingredient in the beverage thadal. It is also a major component of the chicken dish char magaz ka murga, where the seeds are soaked overnight and then ground into a paste. The blend can also be used in sweet dishes such as halva, panjiri, and roasted milk.

== See also ==
- Egusi
