= Shukto =

Bengali vegetable dish

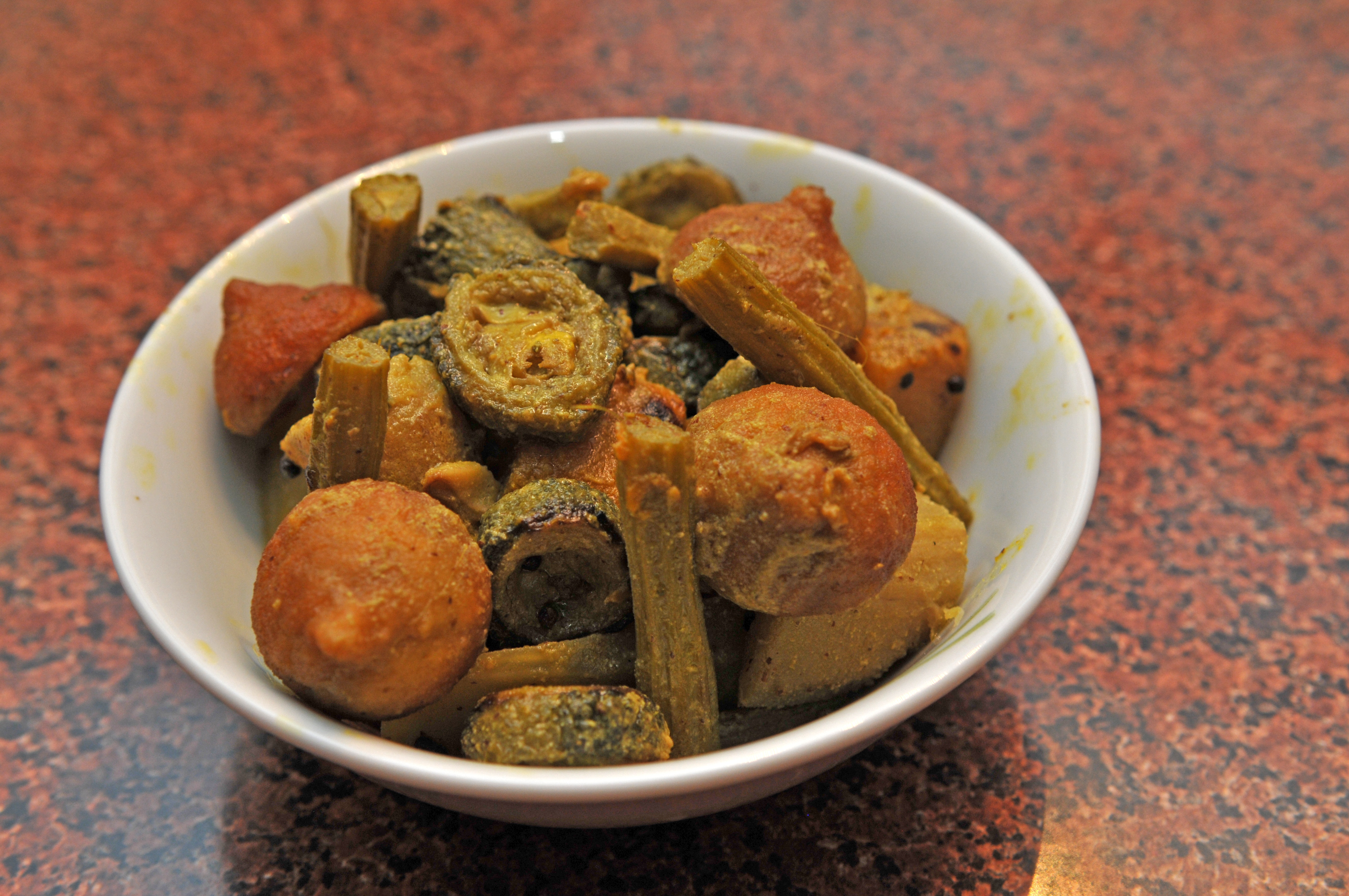
- Shukto
- Alternative names: Shuktoni
- Type: Vegetable curry
- Course: Starter course
- Place of origin: India, Bangladesh
- Region or state: Bengal
- Associated cuisine: India, Bangladesh
- Serving temperature: Room temperature
- Main ingredients: Bitter gourd, drumstick, plantain, bori, eggplant, potato, sweet potato, green chili, radhuni paste, mustard paste, ginger, green bean, hyacinth bean, turmeric powder, Indian spices, mustard oil, milk, ghee, salt

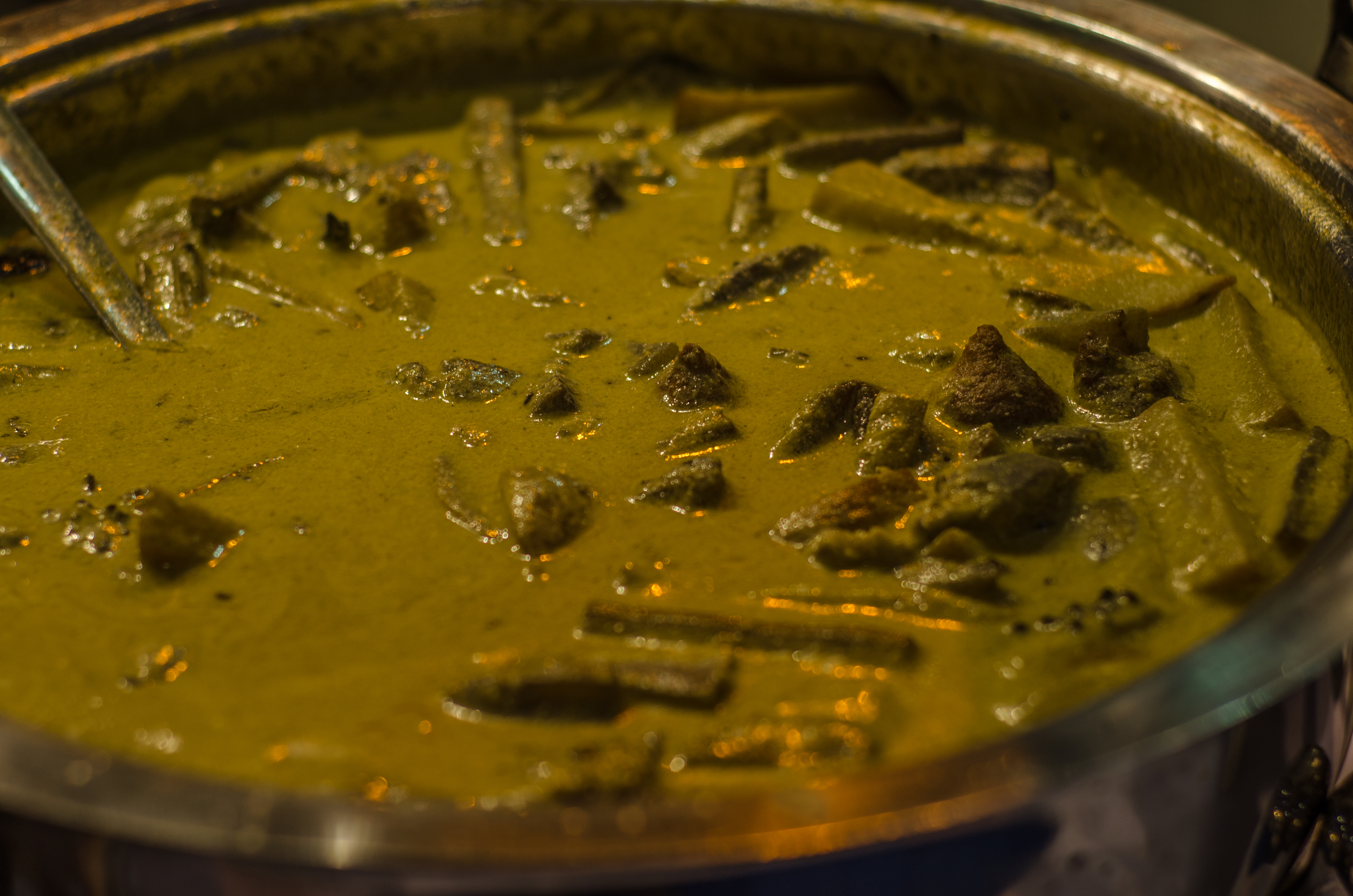
Shukto at a food stall in a Bengali food festival in Kolkata

Shukto (Bengali: শুক্তো) is a popular vegetable dish in Bengali cuisine usually served with rice in the West Bengal state of India and in the neighbouring country Bangladesh. It has a slightly bitter taste and is frequently served at the banquets of Bengali religious and social functions, such as annaprasana, sraddhya, or bibaha, as a part of traditional Bengali thali.

Shukto has numerous different variations and can be prepared in different ways.

The tradition of starting a meal by consuming bitters, considered to have a medicinal value, dates back to ancient times and was promoted by the authors of Ayurveda. Shukto was consumed as a cooling agent in the hot and humid climates of the ancient kingdoms of undivided Bengal like Anga and Vanga. In Kalinga, now present-day Odisha, a similar vegetable stew called santuḷa is popular. Shukto is also mentioned in Mangal-Kāvya, written during the medieval period, and in the biographies of Sri Chaitanya.

== Variations ==
Dudh shukto is a popular variant which is prepared with milk to alleviate the bitter taste of the dish.

Some variants are made with fish of different sizes. Such variants of shukto typically use turmeric, which is usually absent in the vegetarian variants. Some of the variants even exclude the bitter vegetables and are prepared with fenugreek seeds instead, to preserve the bitterness.

== See also ==
- List of Indian dishes
- List of Bangladeshi dishes
