= Masala dabba =

Spice storage container

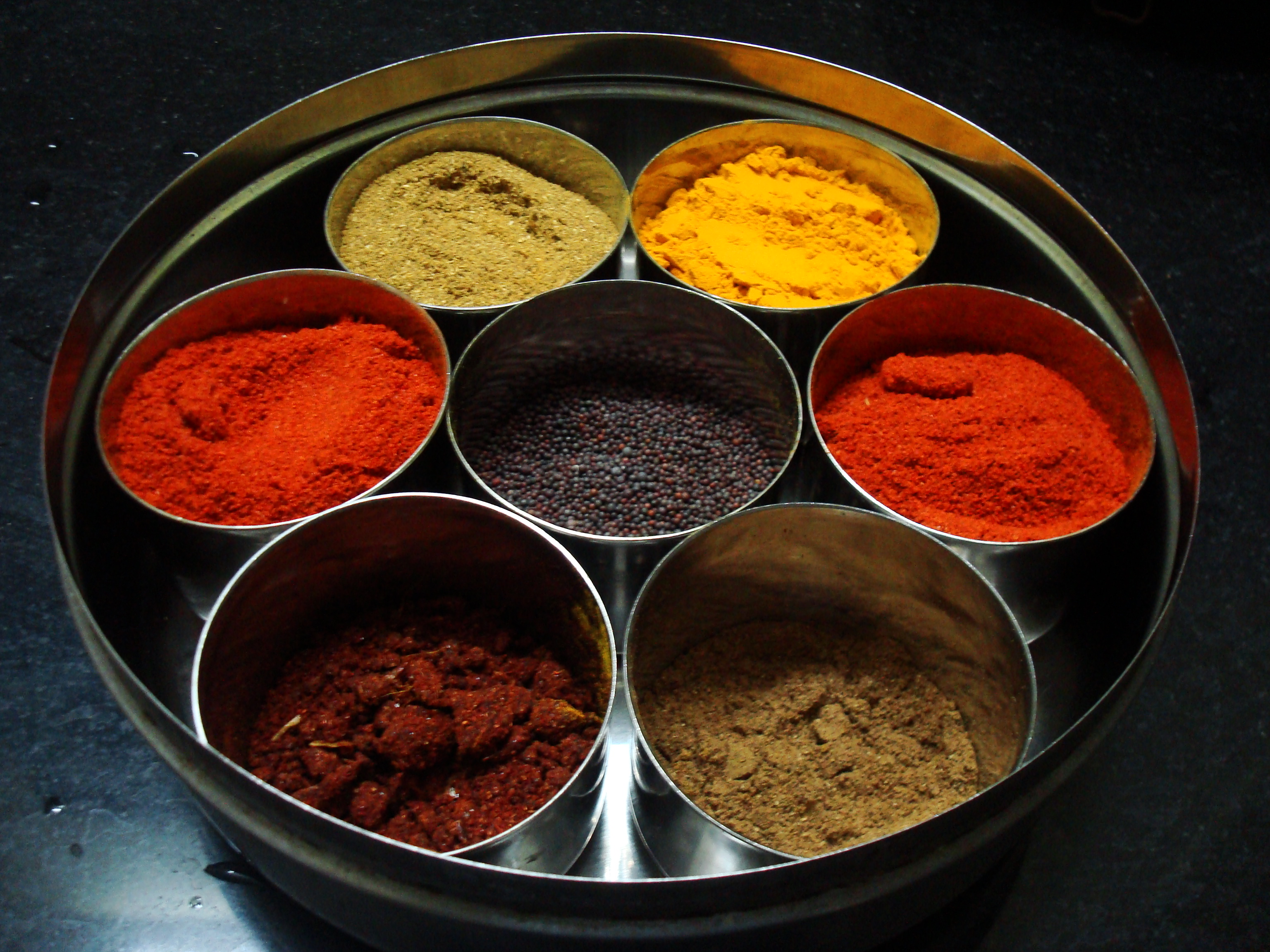
Clockwise from top right: turmeric, chilli powder, garam masala, ginger-garlic-chilli dry masala, chilli powder again, powdered cumin seeds. At the centre are black mustard seeds.

A masala box (dabbe, or dabba) is a spice storage container widely used in Indian kitchens.

A typical masaladabbi has a number of small cups, often seven, placed inside a round or square box. Some modern boxes have transparent lids and display the contents inside. Usually a small spoon (approximately 1/2 teaspoon size) accompanies the box. Spices commonly stored in a masala dabba include but are not limited to mustard, chili powder, garam masala, cumin, fenugreek, variety of masalas, ajwain (bishop's weed).

Some antique masaladabbis are heirloom art objects, and are passed on in a family from generation to generation.
