= Panch phoron =

South Asian whole spice blend

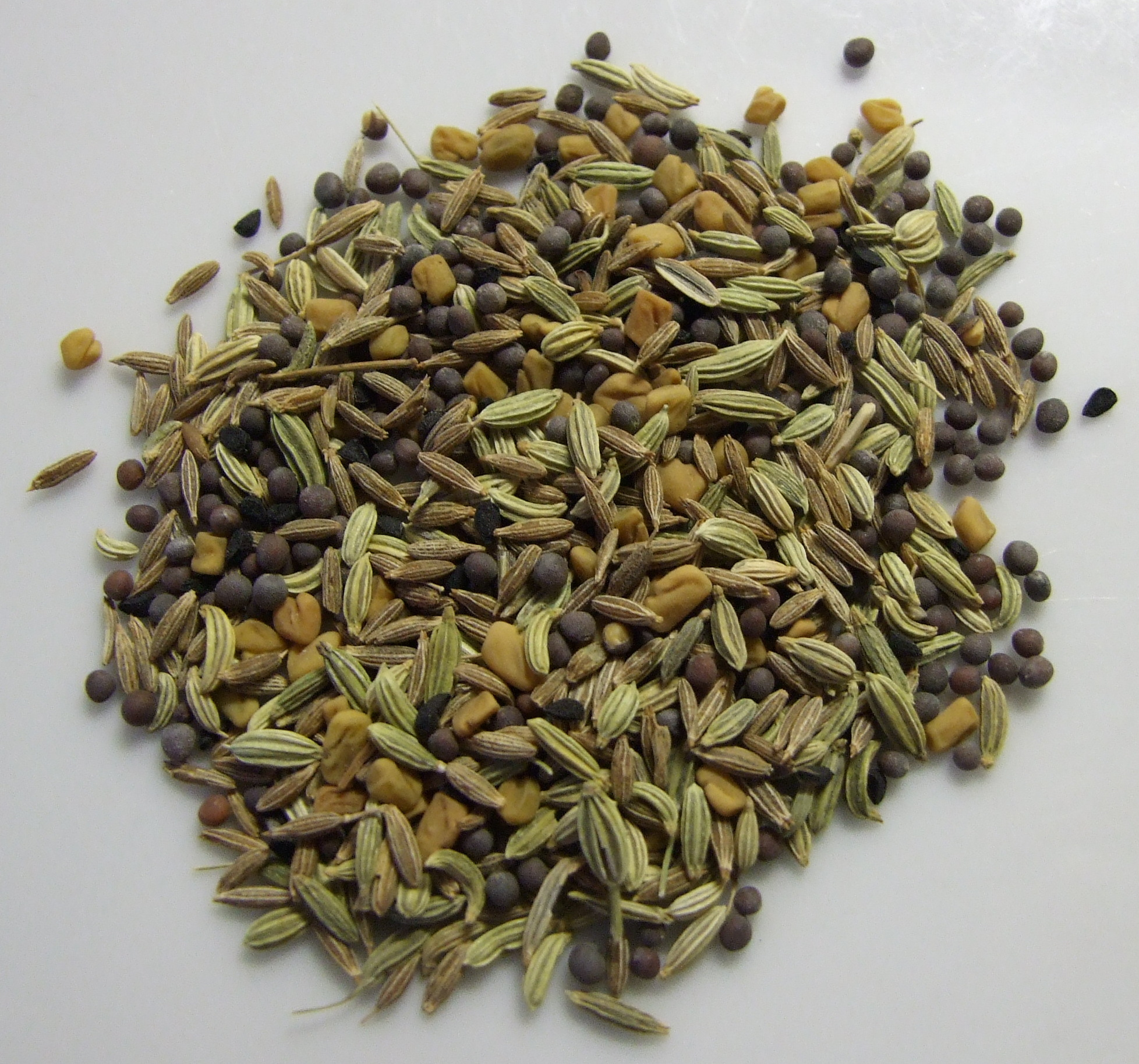
- Panch phoron
- Alternative names: Panch phodan, pancha phutana
- Type: Spice blend
- Region or state: Bangladesh, East India
- Main ingredients: Fenugreek seed, nigella seed, cumin seed, black mustard seed (or wild celery seed (radhuni)), and fennel seed
- Ingredients generally used: Radhuni
- Similar dishes: Chinese five-spice powder

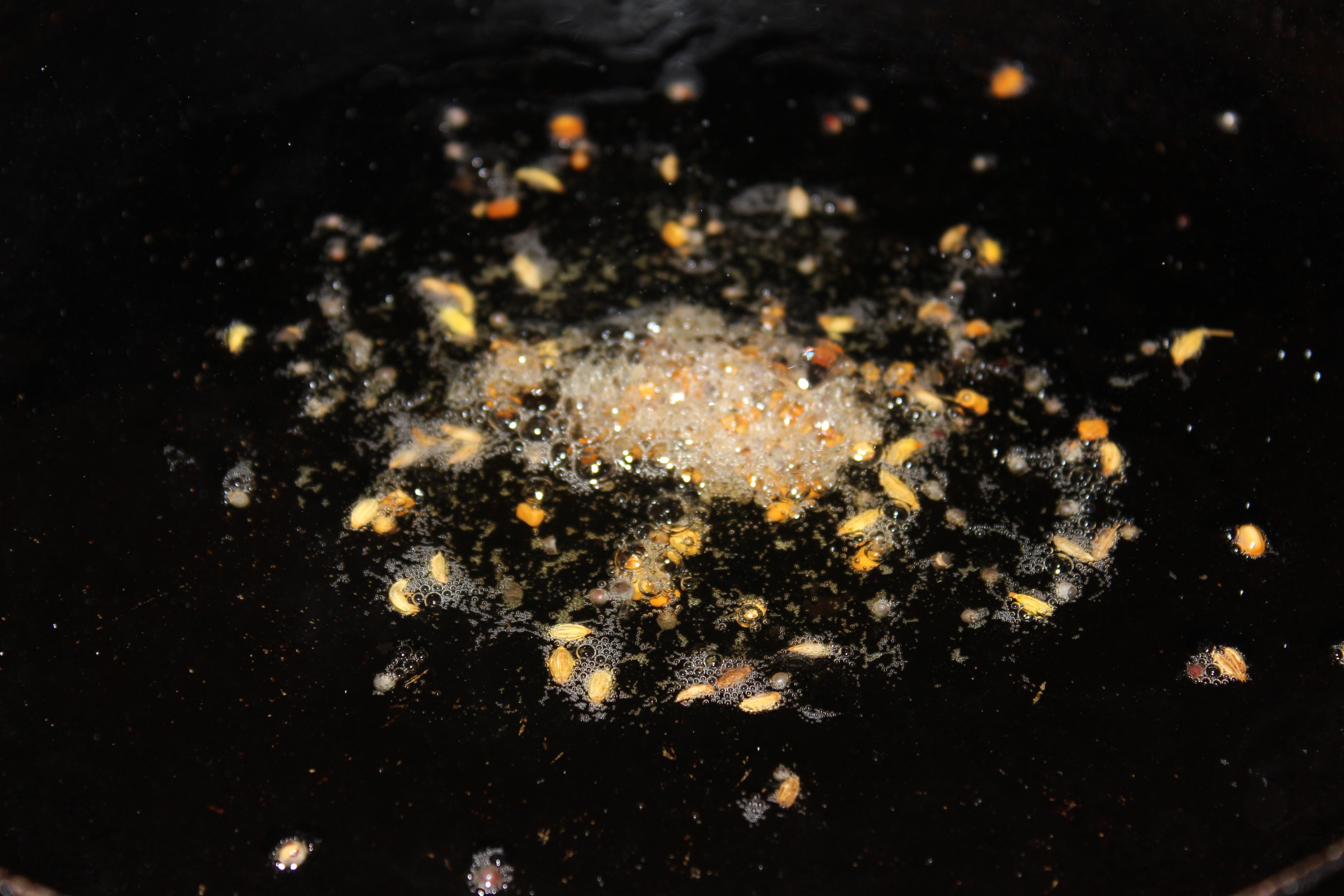
Pancha phutana (in Odia) in frying pan

Panch phoron (Bengali: পাঁচ ফোড়ন), panch phoran (Bhojpuri: 𑂣𑂁𑂒 𑂤𑂷𑂩𑂢), pānch phodan or pāncha phutaṇa (Odia: ପାଞ୍ଚ ଫୁଟଣ), is a whole spice blend, originating from Bangladesh and the eastern part of India, used as a prominent ingredient in the cuisines of Bangladesh, Indian states of West Bengal, Odisha, and the Bhojpuri region of Bihar. It is also used in the cuisines of Northeast India, other areas of Bhojpur, Mithila, Assam and Nepal. The name literally means "five spices".

All of the spices in panch phoron are seeds. Typically, it consists of fenugreek seed (methi), cumin seed (jeera), nigella seed (kalonji), black mustard seeds and fennel seed (mouri/saunf) in equal parts. The black mustard seeds are sometimes substituted with wild celery seed (radhuni). Some cooks prefer to use smaller proportions of fenugreek seeds, because of their mildly bitter taste. Unlike most spice mixes, panch phoron is always used whole.

== See also ==
- Chinese five-spice powder
