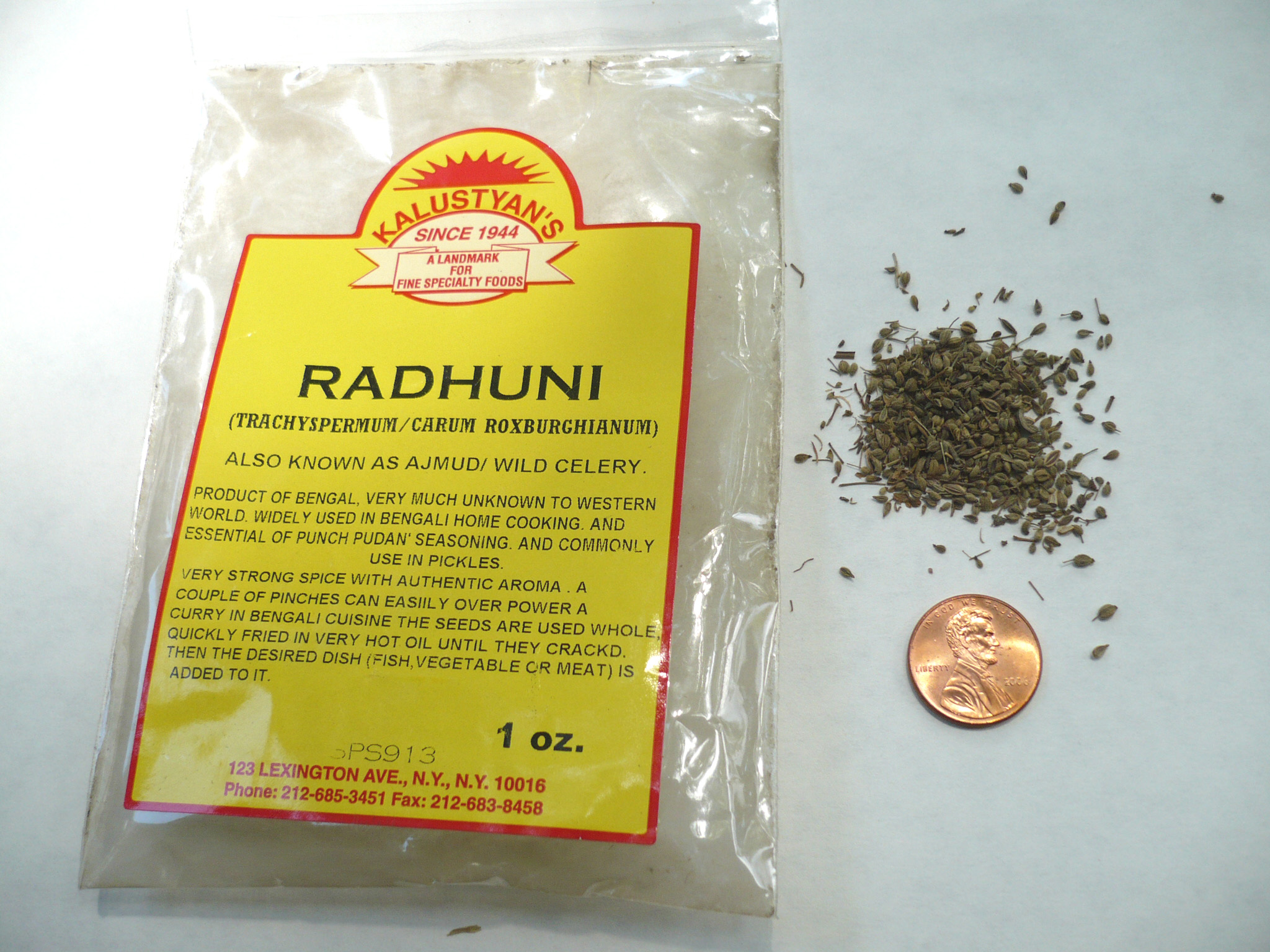
- Radhuni seeds

Scientific classification
- Kingdom: Plantae
- Clade: Embryophytes
- Clade: Tracheophytes
- Clade: Spermatophytes
- Clade: Angiosperms
- Clade: Eudicots
- Clade: Asterids
- Order: Apiales
- Family: Apiaceae
- Genus: Psammogeton
- Species: P. involucratus

Binomial name
- Psammogeton involucratus (Roxb.) Mousavi, Mozaff. & Zarre

Synonyms
- Apium involucratum Roxb.; Carum roxburghianum Benth ex Waring; Trachyspermum roxburghianum H.Wolff; Trachyspermum involucratum (Roxb.) H.Wolff

= Psammogeton involucratus =

Radhuni

Species of flowering plant

Psammogeton involucratus, or radhuni' in Bengali (Bengali: রাধুনি), is a flowering plant in the family Apiaceae. It is grown extensively in South Asia, Southeast Asia, and Indonesia. Its aromatic dried fruits are often used in Bengali cuisine including that of Bangladesh and West Bengal in India. It is sometimes used as one of the key ingredients of "Panch phoron" replacing the mustard seeds in Indian cuisine. The fresh leaves are used as an herb in Thailand and it is used medicinally in Myanmar and Sri Lanka.

== Characteristics ==
The small dried fruits, commonly referred to as seeds, are similar in appearance to those of ajwain, celery, and caraway. Because of their similarity in both appearance and flavor, it is often confused or substituted with celery seed.

== Etymology ==
Known as radhuni' in Bengali (Bengali: রাধুনি), is often confused with celery and is known as wild celery in English. It is known as ajmod in Hindi (Hindi: अजमोद) and Urdu (Urdu: اجمود), both derived from Sanskrit ajamoda (Sanskrit: अजमोद) or ajamodika (Sanskrit: अजमोदिका), from which the name for ajwain is also derived. It is also known as kant-balu in Burmese, and phak chi lom in Thai (Thai: ผักชีล้อม), although this name may also refer to a variety of celery. It is also known as asamodagam (අසමෝදගම්) in Sri Lanka.

== Uses ==
It is a very strong spice, with a characteristic smell similar to parsley and a taste similar to celery. A couple of pinches can easily overpower a curry. In Bengali cuisine the seeds are used whole, quickly fried in very hot oil until they crackle. It is commonly used in the Bengali dish shukto. They are sometimes part of a local panch phoron (Bengali five-spice) mixture replacing black mustard seeds; the other ingredients are cumin seed, fenugreek seed, fennel seed, and nigella seed. In other places, a common use is in pickling or spice mixtures. It is commonly used as an herb for diarrhea, gastritis, loss of appetite, vomiting, abdominal distention, stomachache related to indigestion, and worm diseases.
