= Bengali Muslims =

Ethno-linguistic and religious population in Bangladesh and India

Bengali Muslims: বাঙালি মুসলিম; বাঙ্গালী মুসলমান
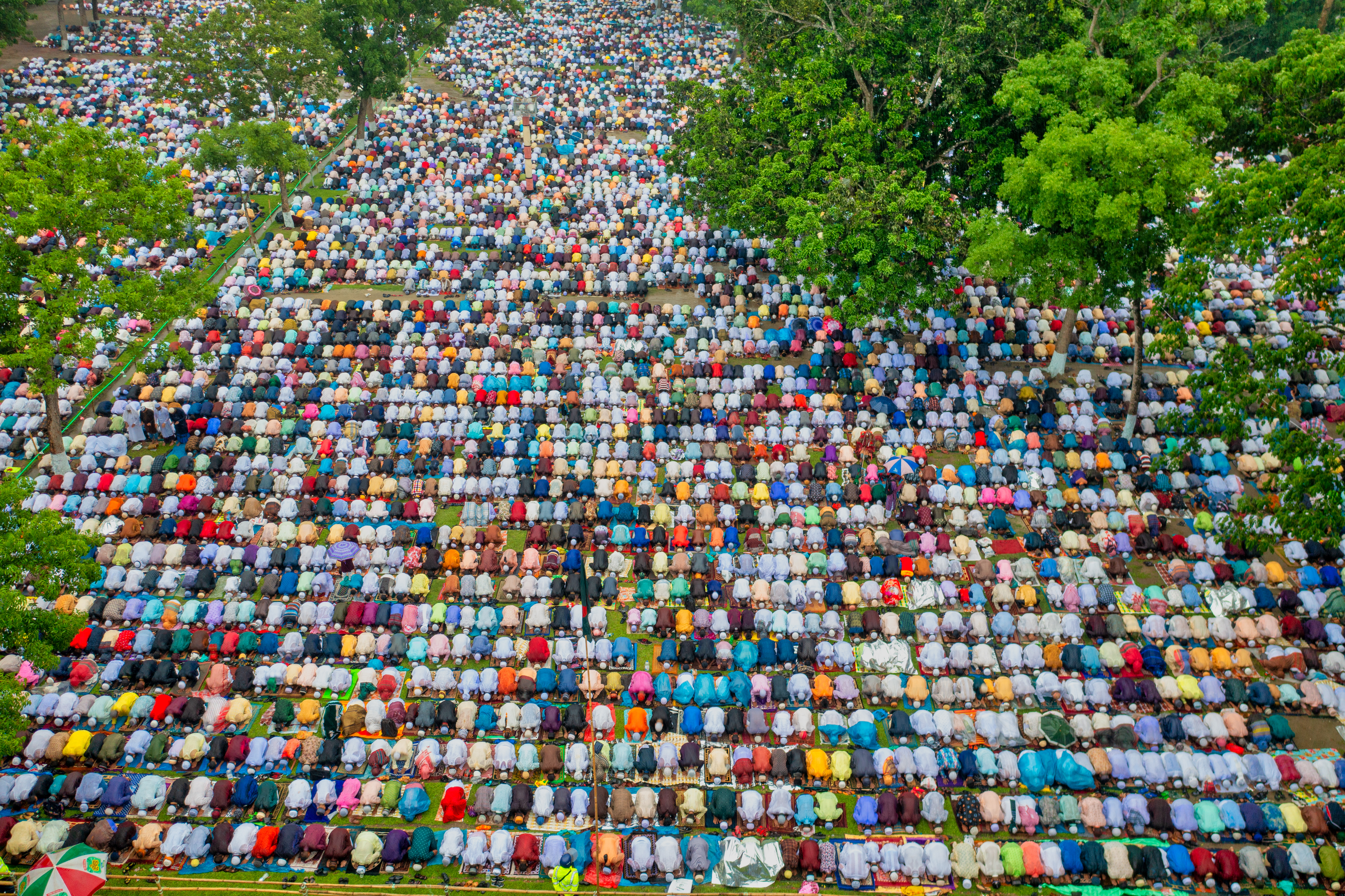
- Bengali Muslim men performing Eid prayer at Sholakia Eidgah in Bangladesh

Total population
- c. 215-220 million (2025 est.)

Regions with significant populations
- Bangladesh: ~160 million (2025 est.) (Note: 2022 census & 2025 IMF Report)
- India (West Bengal, Assam, and Tripura): ~36 million (2025 est.) (Note: The estimated population of India in 2026 is about 1.48 billion, of which approximately 8% are Bengalis. Approximately 30% of them are Bengali Muslims.)
- Others: ~15-17 million

Religions
- Predominantly Sunni Islam with a Shia minority

Languages
- Bengali; Arabic (liturgical)

Related ethnic groups
- Bengali Hindus, Bengali Buddhists, Bengali Christians

Bengali Muslims (Bengali: বাঙ্গালী মুসলমান; pronounced [baŋgali musɔlman]) are adherents of Islam who ethnically, linguistically and genealogically identify as Bengalis. Comprising over 70% of the global Bengali population, they are the second-largest ethnic group among Muslims after Arabs. Bengali Muslims make up the majority of Bangladesh's citizens, and are the largest religious minority in the Indian states of West Bengal, Tripura and Assam.

They speak or identify the Bengali language as their mother tongue. The majority of Bengali Muslims are Sunnis who follow the Hanafi school of jurisprudence.

Due to its extensive trade contacts, Bengal has had a Muslim presence in the region since the early 8th century CE, but conquest of the Bengal region by the Delhi Sultanate brought Muslim rule to Bengal. The governors of the region soon broke away to form a Bengal Sultanate, which was a supreme power of the medieval Islamic East. European traders identified the Bengal Sultanate as "the richest country to trade with". The Sultans of Bengal promoted the development of Bengali as a language and the writing of Islamic literature in Bengali, paving the way for the development of a distinct Bengali Muslim culture, while many intellectuals and scholars from throughout the Muslim world migrated to Bengal.

Although Islamic culture had long developed in Bengal, it was after the Mughal Conquest of Bengal in the early 17th century and their subsequent attempt to expand cultivation in the still-forested eastern part of Bengal that a majority of Bengal would develop an Islamic identity. Mughal revenue policies encouraged Muslim adventurers to organise the development of agricultural societies among indigenous peoples with weak ties to Hinduism, who increasingly blended aspects of Islamic cosmology with folk religious worldviews and practices. Thus, the majority of the rural population of central, northern and eastern Bengal would develop an Islamic identity, and the majority of Bengali Muslims today descend from these indigenous peoples. This expansion of cultivation also led to tremendous economic growth, and the increasingly-independent Bengal Subah would be one of the wealthiest regions in the world. Bengal viceroy Muhammad Azam Shah assumed the imperial throne. Mughal Bengal became increasingly independent under the Nawabs of Bengal in the 18th century.

After the East India Company conquered Bengal from the Mughals in the 18th century, they implemented the Permanent Settlement, which led to the creation of a new class of mostly upper-caste Hindu zamindars, while putting additional burdens on the peasants, who were largely Muslims. Inspired by increasingly available travel to Arabia, religious revivalists such as Titumir and Haji Shariatullah urged an abandonment of perceived non-Islamic folk practices among the lower class Bengali Muslims, and later organised them in agitations against the zamindars and the East India Company.

In Bengal, the British Government organised the 1905 Partition of Bengal, which created a new Muslim-dominated province of Eastern Bengal and Assam, although this would be reversed in 1911. Starting in the early 20th century, British efforts to bring what they considered 'waste' land under cultivation resulted in the large-scale immigration of Bengali Muslim peasants to Lower Assam and Arakan in what would become Myanmar. Increasingly in the early 20th century, tensions between Bengali Muslims and Hindus, particularly Bengali Muslim resentment of landowning Hindus, resulted in widespread support among Bengali Muslims for a separate Pakistan, which near Partition resulted in widespread communal violence. After the Partition of India in 1947, they comprised the demographic majority of Pakistan until the independence of East Pakistan (historic East Bengal) as Bangladesh in 1971.

== Identity ==
A Bengali is a person of ethnic and linguistic heritage from the Bengal region in South Asia speaking the Indo-Aryan Bengali language. Islam arrived in the first millennium and influenced the native Bengali culture. The influx of Persian, Turkic, Arab and Mughal settlers contributed further diversity to the cultural development of the region. The Muslim population in Bengal further rose with the agricultural and administrative reforms during the Mughal period, particularly in eastern Bengal. Today, most Bengali Muslims live in the modern country of Bangladesh, the world's fourth largest Muslim-majority country, along with the Indian states of West Bengal and Assam.

The majority of Bengali Muslims are Sunnis who follow the Hanafi school of jurisprudence. There are also minorities of Shias and Ahmadiyas, as well as people who identify as non-denominational (or "just a Muslim").

== History ==
=== Early contacts ===
Rice-cultivating communities existed in Bengal since the second millennium BCE. The region was home to a large agriculturalist population, marginally influenced by Dharmic religions. Buddhism influenced the region in the first millennium. The Bengali language developed from Apabhramsa, Sanskrit, Magadhi Prakrit between the 7th and 10th centuries. It once formed a single Indo-Aryan branch with Assamese and Oriya, before the languages became distinct.

Centuries prior to the advent of Islam into the region, Bengal was a major centre of Buddhism on the Indian Subcontinent. The area was under the rule of the Buddhist Pala Empire for several centuries until its collapse and subsequent conquest by the Hindu Sena Empire in the 1170s. This was an era of significant Buddhist-Brahmin religious conflict as they represented diametrically opposite camps in the Dharmic tradition with the Buddhist focus on equality threatening the Brahmin caste-based power structure. In the preceding centuries Buddhism underwent a slow decline as Hindu kingdom gradually enveloped Buddhists states in the area and began of process of "de-Buddification" manifested by the reframing of Buddhist figures as Hindu avatars and the reincorporation of resistant Buddhist subjects into lower castes in society. As the Pala Empire's base of power was in Northern and Eastern Bengal, it is likely that these were areas with large Buddhist majorities which were likely heavily subjugated the Sena Empire.

Historical evidences suggest the early Muslim traders and merchants visited Bengal while traversing the Silk Road in the first millennium. One of the earliest mosques in South Asia is under excavation in northern Bangladesh, indicating the presence of Muslims in the area around the lifetime of Muhammad. Starting in the 9th century, Muslim merchants increased trade with Bengali seaports. Islam first appeared in Bengal during Pala rule, as a result of increased trade between Bengal and the Arab Abbasid Caliphate. Coins of the Abbasid Caliphate have been discovered in many parts of the region. The people of Samatata, in southeastern Bengal, during the 10th-century were of various religious backgrounds. During this time, Arab geographer Al-Masudi, who authored The Meadows of Gold, travelled to the region and noticed a Muslim community of inhabitants.

In addition to trade, Islam was also being introduced to the people of Bengal through the migration of Sufi missionaries prior to conquest. The earliest known Sufi missionaries were Syed Shah Surkhul Antia and his students, most notably Shah Sultan Rumi, in the 11th century. Rumi settled in present-day Netrokona, Mymensingh where he influenced the local ruler and population to embrace Islam.

=== Early Islamic kingdoms ===
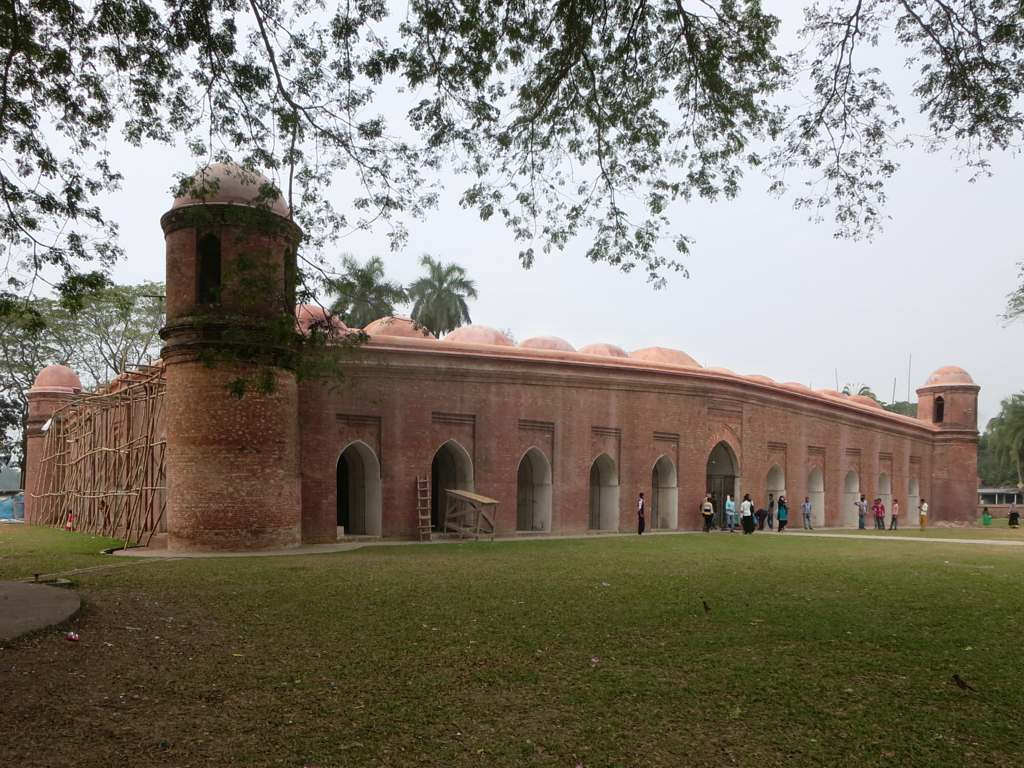
The Mosque City of Bagerhat is a UNESCO World Heritage Site

While Bengal was under the Hindu Sena Empire, subsequent Muslim conquests helped spread Islam throughout the region. Bakhtiyar Khalji, a Turkic Muslim general, defeated king Lakshman Sen in 1206 CE and annexed large parts of Bengal to the Delhi Sultanate. Khalji also mounted an invasion of Tibet. Following this initial conquest, an influx of missionaries arrived in Bengal and many Bengalis began to adopt Islam as their way of life. Sultan Balkhi and Shah Makhdum Rupos settled in the present-day Rajshahi Division in northern Bengal, preaching to the communities there. A community of 13 Muslim families headed by Burhanuddin also existed in the northeastern Hindu city of Srihatta (Sylhet), claiming their descendants to have arrived from Chittagong. By 1303, hundreds of Sufi preachers led by Shah Jalal aided the Muslim rulers in Bengal to conquer Sylhet, turning the town into Jalal's headquarters for religious activities. Following the conquest, Jalal disseminated his followers across different parts of Bengal to spread Islam, and became a household name among Bengali Muslims.

=== Bengal Sultanate ===
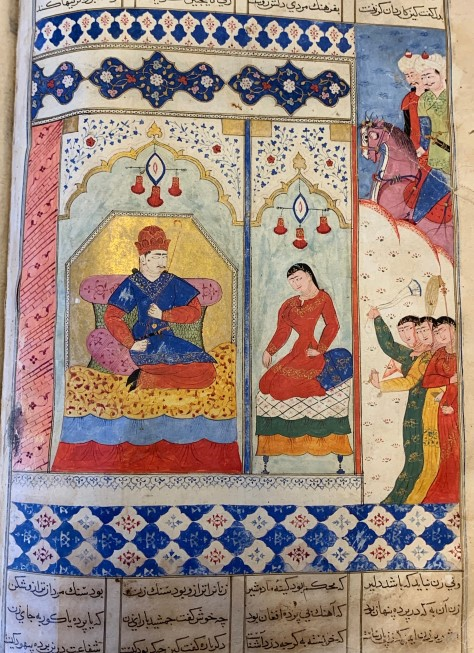
A manuscript painting from the Bengal Sultanate depicting Alexander the Great in Nizami Ganjavi's Iskandarnama. The manuscript was produced during the reign of Sultan Nusrat Shah.

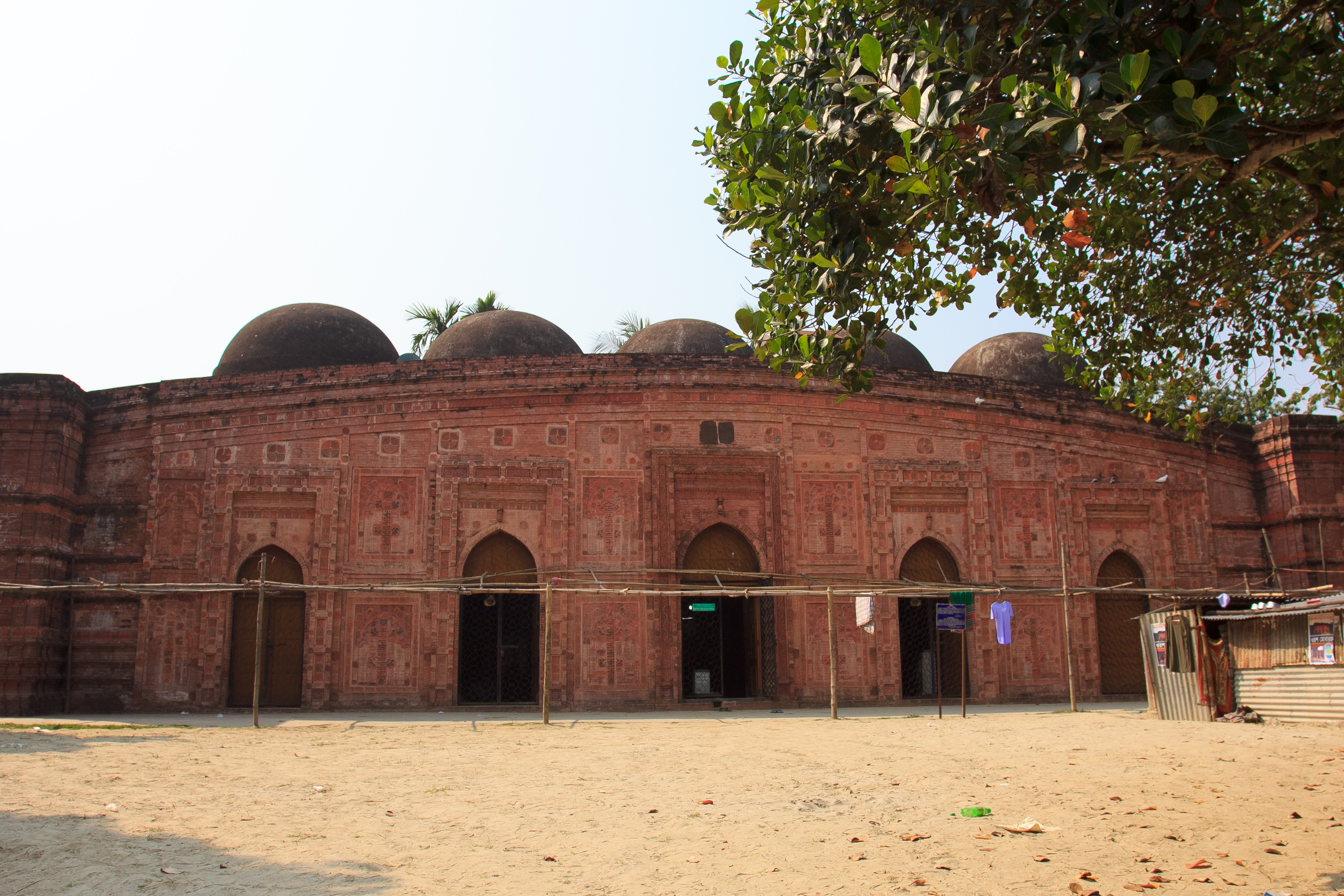
Pathrail Mosque

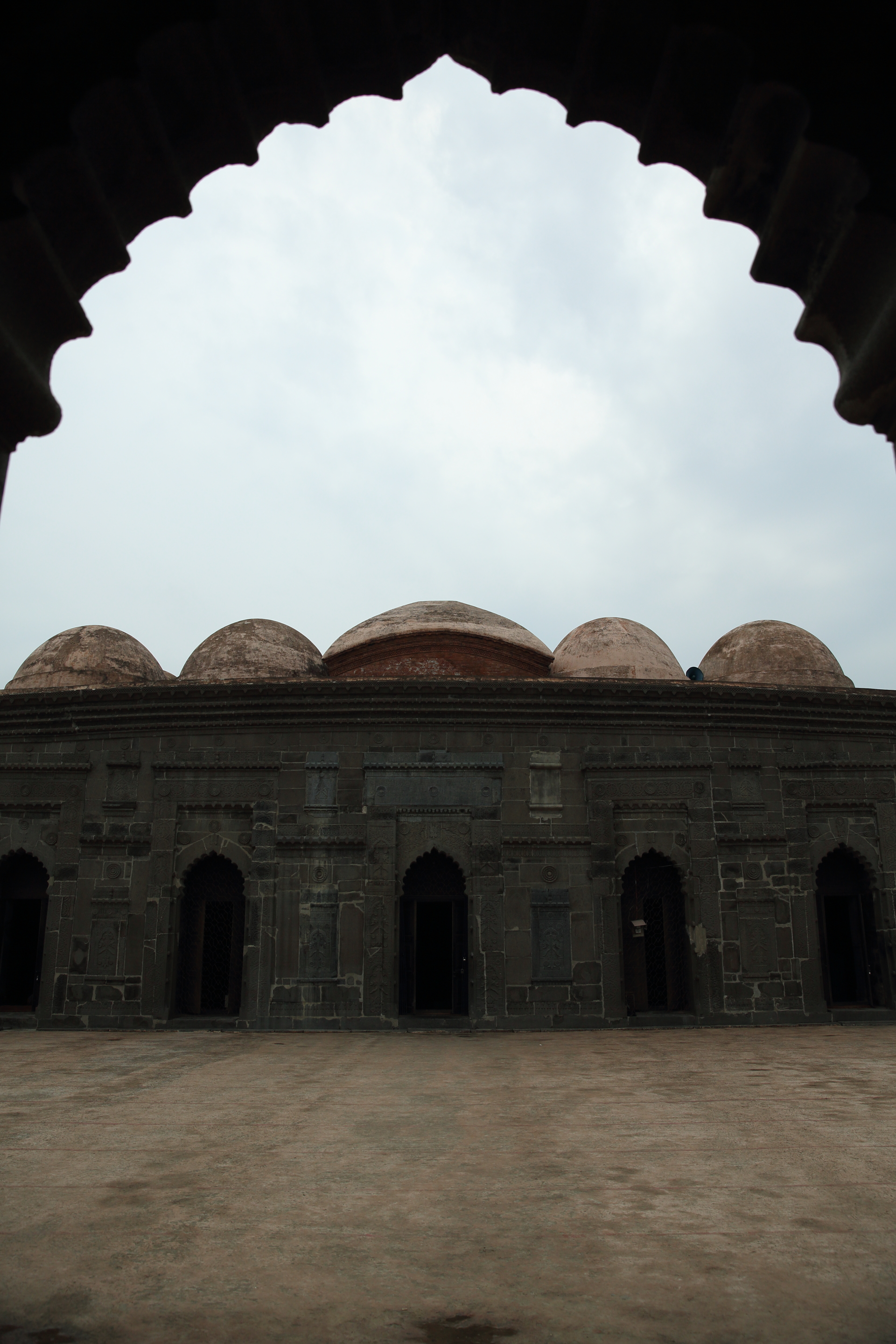
Choto Sona Mosque

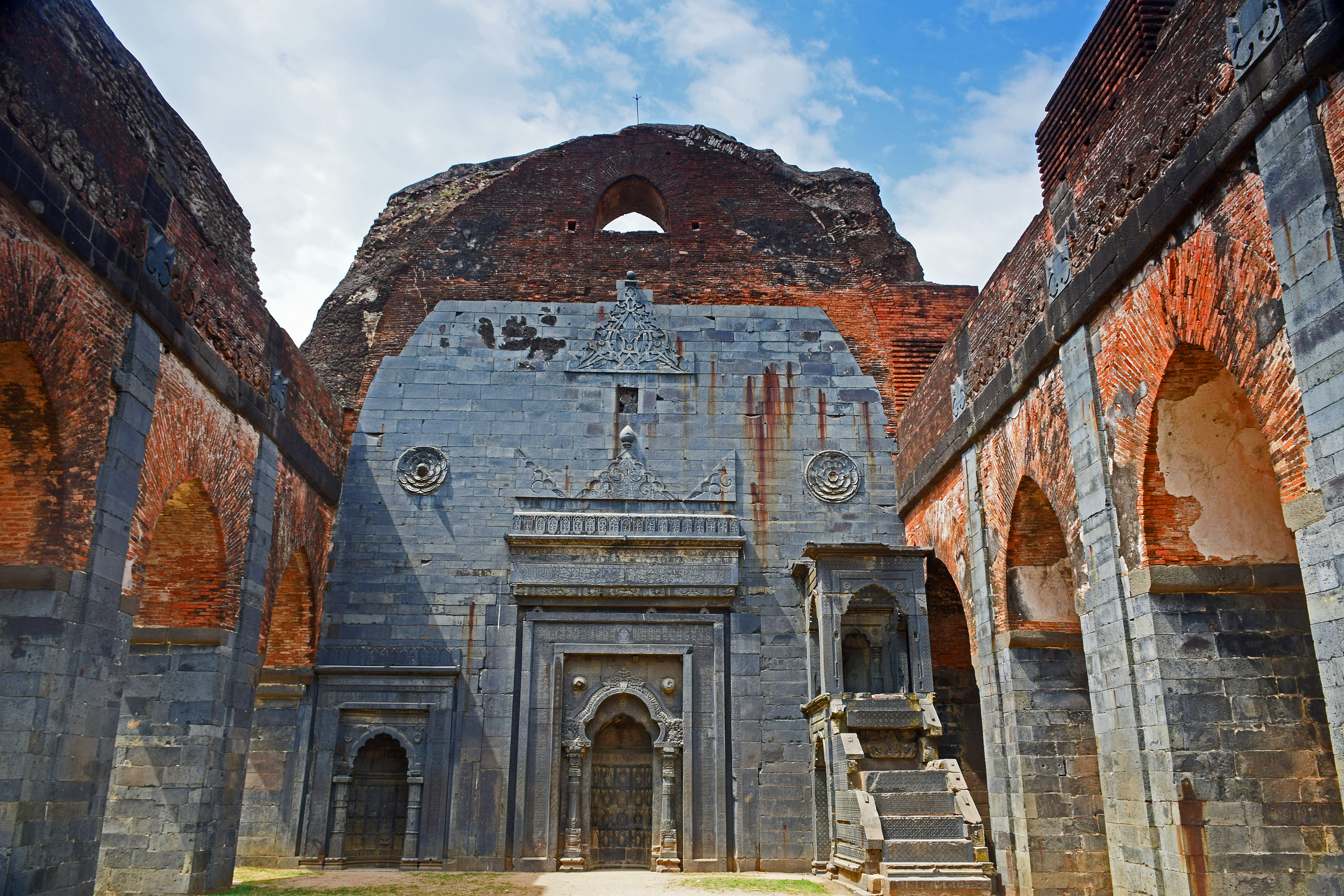
Ruins of Adina, once the largest mosque in the Indian subcontinent

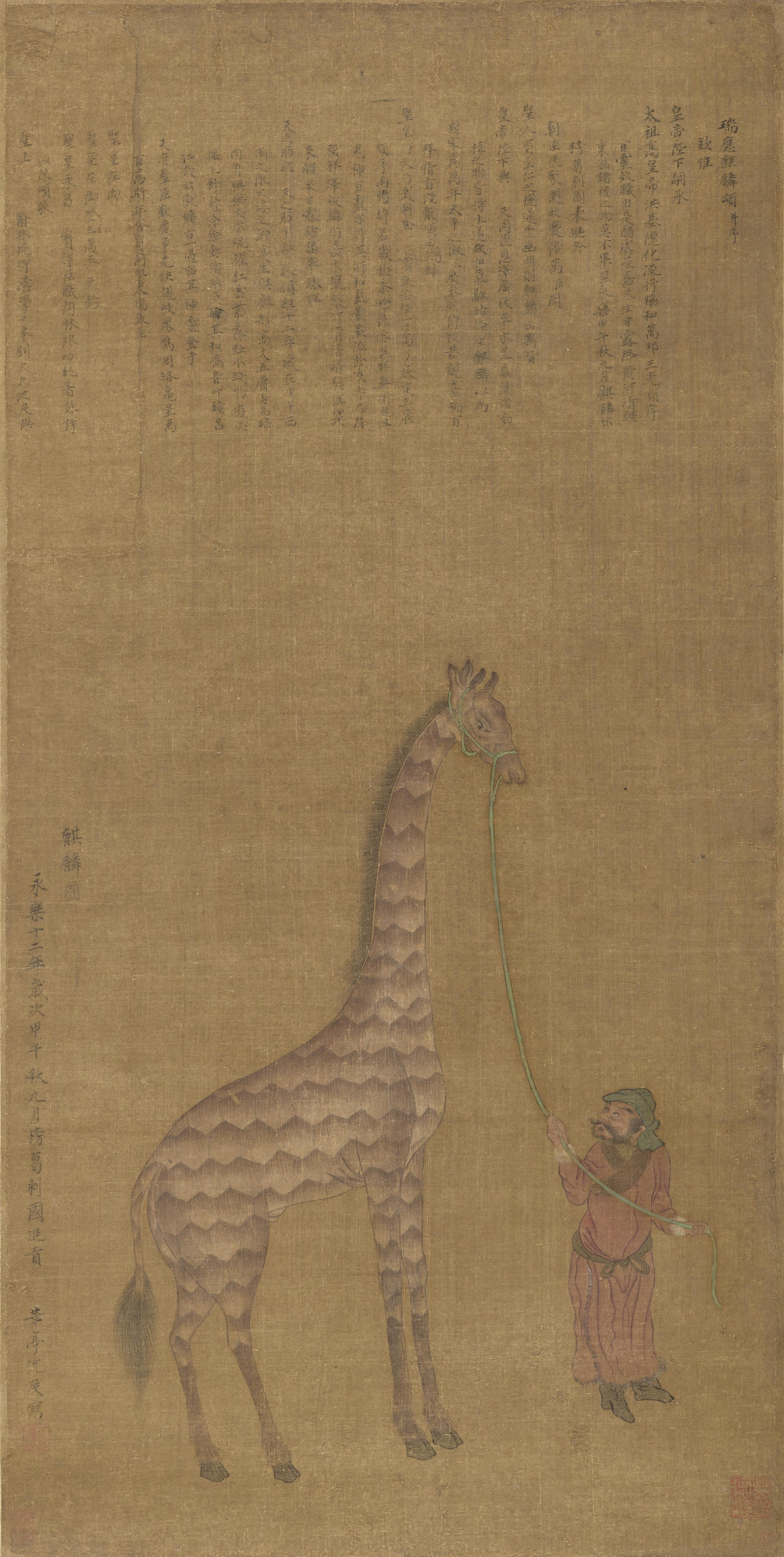
The giraffe gifted by the Sultan of Bengal to China's emperor being presented by a Bengali envoy on 20 September 1414

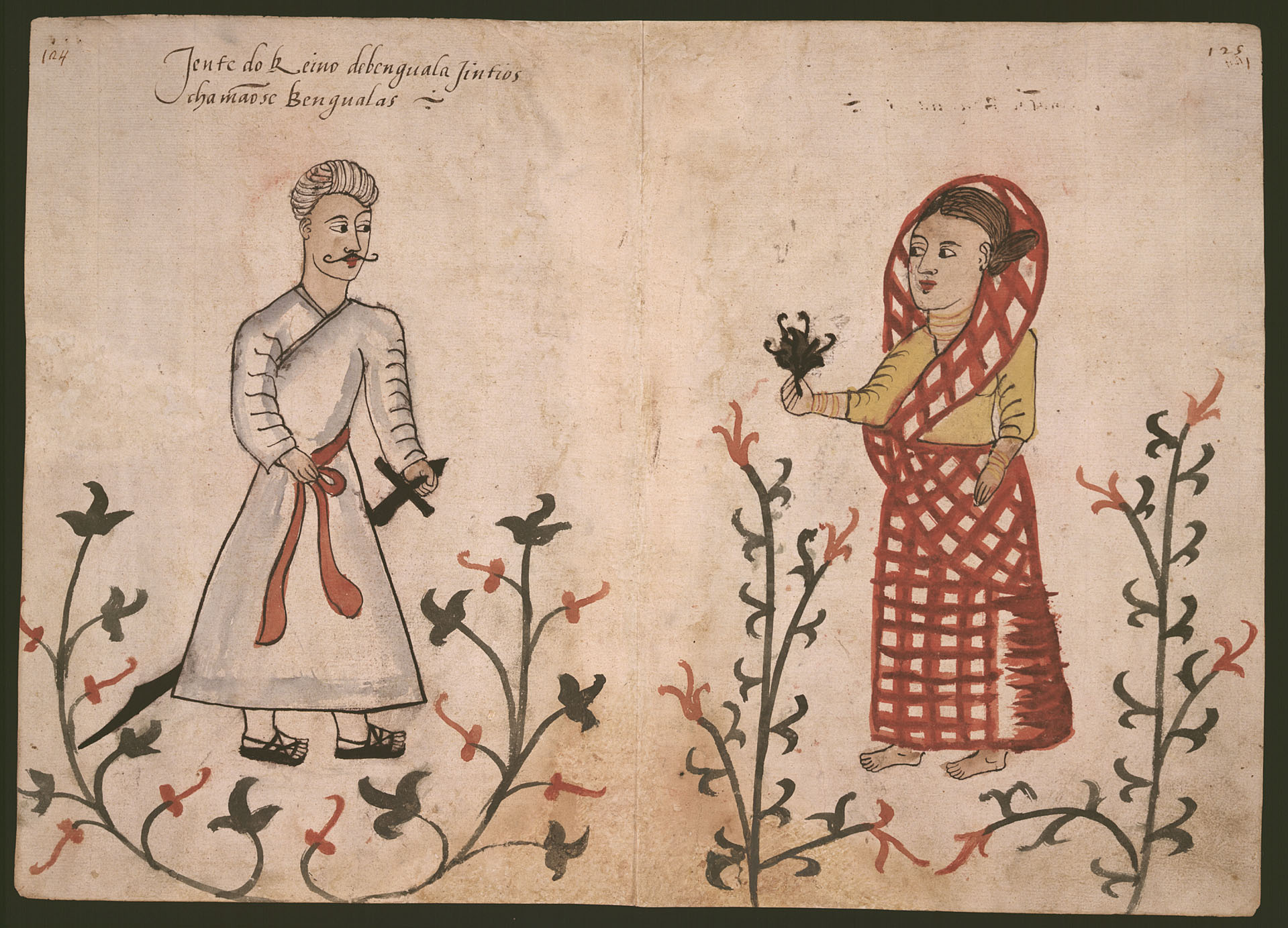
"People of the Kingdom of Bengal, gentiles, called Bengalis", 16th-century Portuguese illustration

The establishment of a single united Bengal Sultanate in 1352 by Shamsuddin Ilyas Shah finally gave rise to a "Bengali" sociolinguistic identity. The Ilyas Shahi dynasty acknowledged Muslim scholarship, and this transcended ethnic background. Usman Serajuddin, also known as Akhi Siraj Bengali, was a native of Gaur in western Bengal and became the Sultanate's court scholar during Ilyas Shah's reign. Alongside Persian and Arabic, the sovereign Sunni Muslim nation-state also enabled the language of the Bengali people to gain patronage and support, contrary to previous states which exclusively favoured Sanskrit, Pali and Persian. The converted Sultan Jalaluddin Muhammad Shah funded the construction of Islamic seminaries as far as Mecca and Madina in the Middle East. The people of Arabia came to know these institutions as al-Madaris al-Bangaliyyah (Bengali madrasas).

The Bengal Sultanate was a melting pot of Muslim political, mercantile and military elites. During the 14th century, Islamic kingdoms stretched from Muslim Spain in the west to Bengal in the east. Moroccan traveller Ibn Battuta's diary is one of the best known accounts of the prelude to the Bengal Sultanate. Ibn Battuta visited Bengal during the reign of Sultan Fakhruddin Mubarak Shah, a rebel governor of the Delhi Sultanate who established a city state in Sonargaon. At the time, Bengal was divided into the three city states of Sonargaon, Satgaon and Lakhnauti. In 1352, the three city states were united by Ilyas Shah into a single, unitary, independent Bengal Sultanate. The creation of the Bengal Sultanate sparked several Bengal-Delhi Wars, which resulted in Delhi recognising Bengal's independence. The Ilyas Shahi dynasty consolidated Bengali statehood, the economy and diplomatic relations. A network of Mint Towns - provincial capitals which produced the Sultan's sovereign currency called the taka - was established across Bengal. The Bengali state followed the Persian model of statecraft. Muslims from other parts of the world were imported for military, bureaucratic and household services. These immigrants included Turks from upper India who were originally recruited in Central Asia; as well as Abyssinians imported via East Africa into the Bengali port of Chittagong. A highly commercialised and monetised economy evolved. Islamic architecture was introduced on a major scale. A huge mosque called the Adina Mosque was built following the design of the Great Mosque of Damascus. A distinct Bengali Muslim architectural style developed, with terracotta and stone buildings showing a fusion of Persian and Bengali elements. Mosques included two categories, including multi-domed rectangular structures and single-domed square structures. A distinct style of Bengali mihrabs, minbars, terracotta arabesque, and do-chala roofs developed; this influence also spread to other regions.

The Bengal Sultanate was ruled by five dynastic periods, with each period have a particular ethnic identity. The Ilyas Shahi dynasty was of Turkic origins. It was replaced by the Bengali-origin dynasty of Jalaluddin Muhammad Shah and Shamsuddin Ahmad Shah for a few decades before being restored

Jalaluddin Muhammad Shah was born as Jadu, the son of Hindu King Raja Ganesha. He later ruled most of Bengal as a converted Muslim. He maintained a good rapport with non-Muslims in his kingdom. According to an interpretation of a Sanskrit sloka by D. C. Bhattacharya, Jalaluddin appointed Rajyadhar, a Hindu, as the commander of his army. He gained support of Muslim scholars – Ulama and the Sheikhs. He reconstructed and repaired the mosques and other religious architectures destroyed by Raja Ganesha.

In the 1490s, a series of Abyssinian generals took turns in becoming the Sultan of Bengal. They were succeeded by the Hussain Shahi dynasty which was of Arab origin. They were in turn replaced by the Pashtun rulers of the Suri dynasty, who first acted as regional governors before restoring Bengali independence. The last dynasty, the Karrani dynasty, was also of Pashtun origin. The sultanate period saw a flourishing of Islamic scholarship and the development of Bengali literature. Scholars, writers and poets of sultanate-era Bengal included Usman Serajuddin, Alaul Haq, Sheikh Nur Qutb Alam, Alaol, Shah Muhammad Sagir, Abdul Hakim, Syed Sultan, Qadi Ruknu'd-Din Abu Hamid Muhammad bin Muhammad al-'Amidi, Abu Tawwama, Syed Ibrahim Danishmand, Syed Arif Billah Muhammad Kamel and Syed Muhammad Yusuf among others. Bengal's tradition of Persian prose was acknowledged by Hafez. The Dobhashi tradition saw Bengali transliteration of Arabic and Persian words in Bengali texts to illustrate Islamic epics and stories.

During the independent sultanate period, Bengal forged strong diplomatic relations with empires outside the subcontinent. The most notable of these relationships was with Ming China and its emperor Yongle. At least a dozen embassies were exchanged between China and Bengal. The Sultan of Bengal even gifted an East African giraffe to the Emperor of China as a tribute to China-Bengal relations. The Chinese Muslim admiral Zheng He visited Bengal as an envoy of the Emperor of China. Bengali ships transported the embassies of Sumatra, Brunei and Malacca to the port of Canton. China and the Timurid ruler of Herat mediated an end to the Bengal Sultanate-Jaunpur Sultanate War. The Sultan of Bengal also acknowledged the nominal authority of the Abbasid caliph in Cairo. Portuguese India was the first European state entity to establish relations with the Bengal Sultanate. The Bengal Sultan permitted the opening of the Portuguese settlement in Chittagong.

==== Conquests and vassal states ====
Soon after its creation, the Bengal Sultanate sent the first Muslim army into Nepal. Its forces reached as far as Varanasi while pursuing a retreating Delhi Sultan.

Arakan was the most volatile neighbour of the Bengal Sultanate. In 1428, the forces of Bengal restored Min Saw Mun as the king of Arakan after he fled to the court of Jalaluddin Muhammad Shah. According to traditional Arakanese history, Arakan became a tributary state of Bengal and its kings adopted Muslim titles to fashion themselves after Bengali Sultans. Arakan later shrugged off Bengali hegemony and restored full independence. It later invaded southeastern Bengal several times, sometimes with success and sometimes unsuccessfully. Arakan continued to mint its coins following the model of Bengali tanka for 300 years, even after the dissolution of the Bengal Sultanate. A total of 16 Arakanese kings used Muslim titles. Arakan forcefully deported thousands of Bengali Muslims and Hindus during its invasions and collusion with the Portuguese. Deportees included the poet Alaol. As a result, the Bengali minority in Arakan developed a distinct Arakanese identity and became influential elites in Arakanese society. Arakanese Muslims, known today as Rohingya people, trace their ancestry to the period of Bengali influence in Arakan.

The Bengal Sultanate also counted Tripura as a vassal state. Bengal restored the throne of Tripura by helping Ratna Manikya I to assume the throne. The Bengal Sultanate controlled Odisha at various points since the reign of Ilyas Shah. During the reign of Alauddin Hussain Shah, Bengal became an expanding regional empire. Under Hussain Shah, Bengali territory covered Arakan, Assam, Tripura, Orissa, Bihar and Jaunpur. Hussain Shah minted coins with the proclamation "conqueror of Kamrupa, Kamata, Jajnagar and Orissa". The Pratapgarh Kingdom came under Bengali suzerainty. The Hindu kingdom of Chandradwip was annexed by the Hussain Shahi dynasty. In 1498, the Hussain Shahi dynasty dispatched an army under Shah Ismail Ghazi to conquer the Kamata Kingdom. The Bengal forces overthrew the Khen dynasty. Bengali control of Assam extended into the Brahmaputra Valley and up to Hajo. The invasions of the Bengal Sultanate into Assam provided the basis for the formation of Assamese Muslims.

==== Maritime trade ====
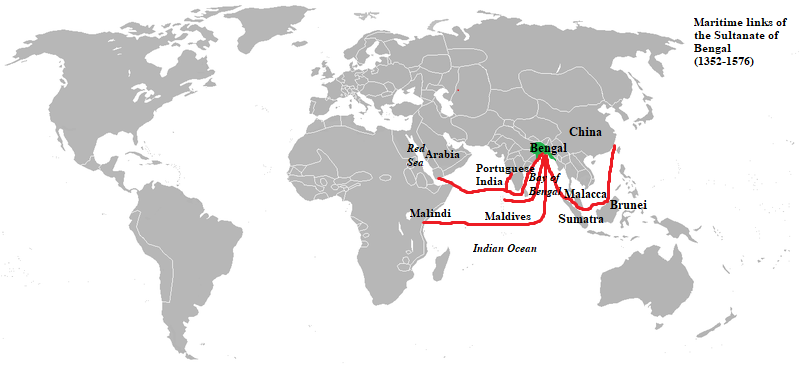
Maritime links of the Bengal Sultanate

Bengali ships dominated the Bay of Bengal and were the largest ships in the Indian and Pacific oceans. A royal vessel from Bengal could accommodate three tribute missions- from Bengal, Brunei and Sumatra- and was evidently the only vessel capable of such a task. European travellers like Ludovico di Varthema, Duarte Barbosa and Tomé Pires wrote about the presence of a large number of wealthy Bengali merchants and shipowners in Malacca. The trade between Bengal and the Maldives, based on rice and cowry shells, was probably done on Arab-style baghlah ships.

The Chinese Muslim envoy Ma Huan wrote about a flourishing shipbuilding industry and Bengal's significant seaborne trade. The muslin trade in Bengal, the production of silk and the development of several other crafts were indicated in Ma Huan's list of items exported from Bengal to China. Bengali shipping co-existed with Chinese shipping until the latter withdrew from the Indian Ocean in the mid-15th-century. Bengali port cities like Chittagong and Satgaon were possibly entrepots for importing and re-exporting goods to China.

=== Mughal period ===
The Mughal Empire eventually controlled the region under its Bengal Subah viceregal province. The Mughal Emperors considered Bengal their most prized province. Emperor Akbar redeveloped the Bengali calendar. In the 16th-century, many Ulama of the Bengali Muslim intelligentsia migrated to other parts of the subcontinent as teachers and instructors of Islamic knowledge such as Sheikh Ali Sher Bengali to Ahmedabad, Usman Bengali to Sambhal and Yusuf Bengali to Burhanpur.

The process of Islamization of eastern Bengal, now Bangladesh, is not fully understood due to limited documentation from the 1200s to 1600s, the period during which Islamization is believed to have occurred. There are numerous theories about how Islam spread in region; however, the overwhelming evidence is strongly suggestive of a gradual transition of the local population from Buddhism, Hinduism and other indigenous religions to Islam starting in the thirteenth century facilitated by Sufi missionaries (such as Shah Jalal in Sylhet for example) and later by Mughal agricultural reforms centred around Sufi missions.

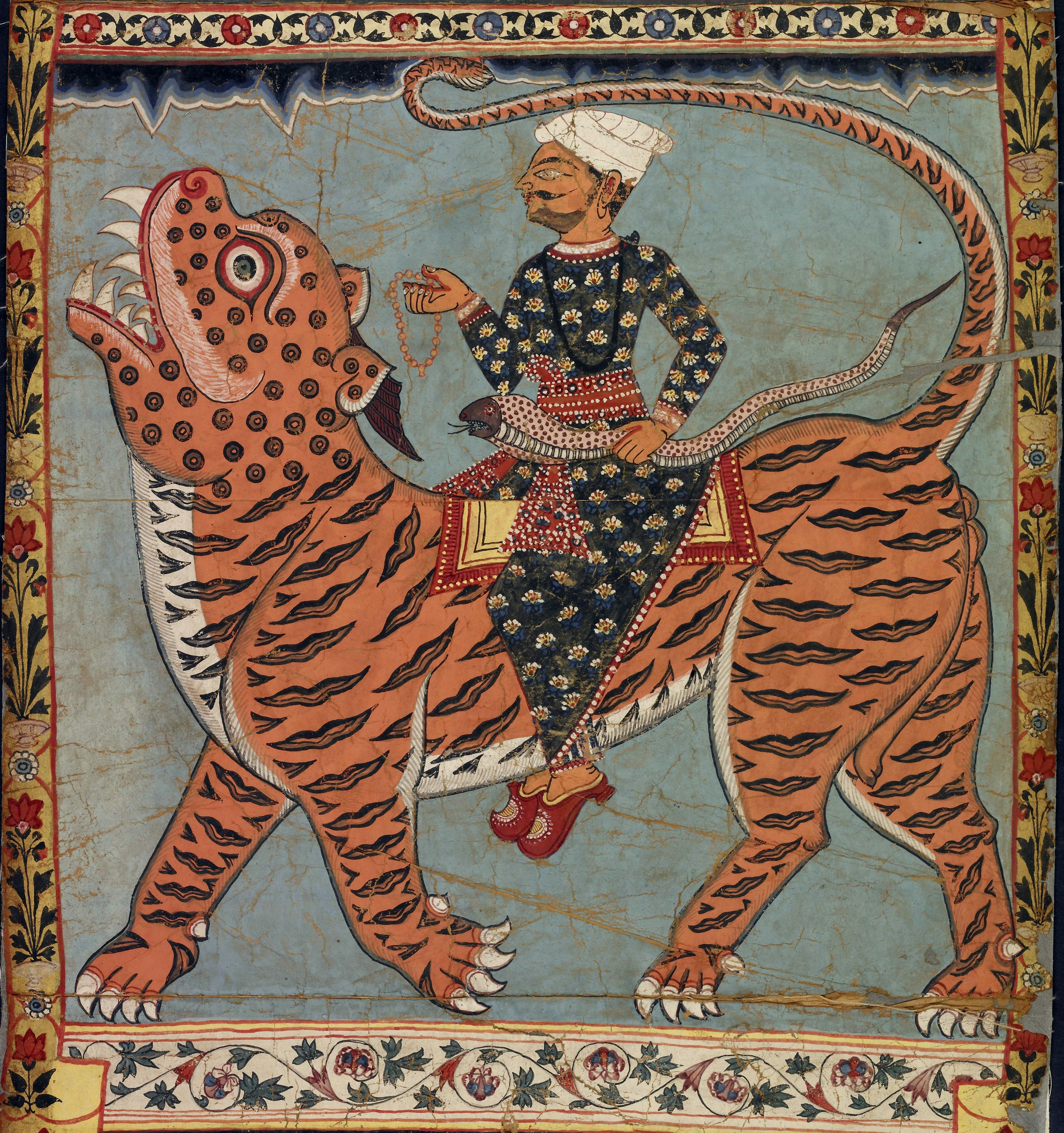
A scene from the Gazi scrolls (Gazir Pat). Pir Gazi was a Sufi preacher. Sufi-led villages were centres of Islamic conversion during the Mughal period.

The factors facilitating conversion to Islam from Buddhism, Hinduism and indigenous religions, again is not fully understood. Lack of primary sources from that era have resulted in various hypotheses. Generally modern prevailing hypotheses about the early stages of Islamification of East Bengal focus on Sufi missionaries capitalising on disaffected Buddhists and other indigenous groups following the initial conquest of the area by the Brahmin and Kshatriya dominated Sena Empire followed a few decades later by the arrival of Bakhtiyar Khalji of the Delhi Sultanate in the early 1200s and the later agrarian reforms of the Mughal Empire in the 1500s.

A few decades following the Sena Conquest of the region, the Sena, themselves, were conquered by Bakhtiyar Khalji opening up the region to a greater influx of Sufi missionaries. This hypothesis would explain why the Islam spread faster in East Bengal than West Bengal. Essentially, East Bengal had a large Buddhist population compared to West Bengal. The conquest of the area by Hindu kingdoms led to the subjugation of Buddhists in the region. With the Turkic conquest, came the arrival of Sufi missionaries who were more successful at converting the largely disaffected Buddhist East Bengal versus the largely Hindu regions of West Bengal.

A few centuries later the agrarian reforms of the Mughal Empire accelerated conversion and population growth across Bangladesh by creating a system of farming villages centred around Sufi missions. The Mughals granted landless peasants land around these missions in order to accelerate development of the fertile Ganges plain. This led to greater concentrations of people in the area with more opportunities for Sufi missionaries to preach Islam. The projects were most evident in the Bhati region of East Bengal, the most fertile part of the delta.

Although the timeline is still debated, a popular theory posed by historian Richard Eaton poses that the Islamization of northern and eastern Bengal occurred in earnest after the Mughal conquest. At the time of the Mughal conquest of Bengal, most of East and North Bengal was still covered by dense forests and inhabited by indigenous communities who were marginally influenced by Dharmic religions and practised shifting cultivation. The Hindu descendants of these indigenous communities are today called Namasudras and Poundras in central and eastern Bengal, and Rajbanshis in north Bengal. The Ganga River had just shifted to its present course along the Padma River channel, opening up these jungles for economic and agricultural development. To exploit this newfound opportunity, the Mughals made large numbers of land grants to individuals to develop the land. Although some of these pioneers were Hindu, the vast majority were Muslims. These pioneers would go into the forests and organise the indigenous inhabitants to clear the land and practice wet rice cultivation. Thus, the economic centre of Bengal shifted from the drier western part to the more fertile east, and East Bengal became the economic engine of the province.

Since most of these pioneers were Muslim, who often were subcontracted by Hindu merchants, the communities they formed developed around village mosques and the indigenous communities became more and more influenced by Islam. And often after the deaths of these pioneers, they were revered as pirs and their shrines became associated with mystical powers. Moreover, Islamic literature which told Islamic stories in settings reminiscent of East Bengal made it easier for the locals to identify with Islamic figures. Thus, gradually indigenous communities slowly began to identify more and more with Islamic culture, but blended it with their original folk culture to a great extent as very few literate Muslims were giving them instruction on Islamic practice. Thus, the majority of East Bengal began to identify as Muslims, and their spiritual culture became a mixture of Islamic and indigenous folk traditions which was very distinct from the Islam practised by the aristocracy. However, the southwestern, northern and eastern edges of Bhati were still largely ruled by Hindu kings, and so a significant fraction of the indigenous population here became more influenced by Hindu ideals and developed into a variety of caste groups.

According to historian Richard M. Eaton, Islam became the religion of the plough in the Bengal delta. Islam's emergence in the region was intimately tied with agriculture. The delta was the most fertile region in the empire. Mughal development projects cleared forests and established thousands of Sufi-led villages, which became industrious farming and crafting communities.

This made East Bengal a thriving melting pot with strong trade and cultural networks. It was the most prosperous part of the subcontinent. East Bengal became the centre of the Muslim population in the eastern subcontinent and corresponds to modern-day Bangladesh.

According to the 1881 Census of Bengal, Muslims constituted a bare majority of the population of Bengal proper (50.2 per cent compared with the Hindus at 48.5 per cent). However, in the eastern part of Bengal, Muslims were thick on the ground. The proportions of Muslims in Rajshahi, Dhaka and Chittagong divisions were 63.2, 63.6 and 67.9 per cent respectively. The debate draws on the writings of some late nineteenth-century authors, but in its current form was initially formulated in 1963 by M.A. Rahim. Rahim suggested that a significant proportion of Bengal's Muslims were not Hindu converts but were descendants of 'aristocratic' immigrants from various parts of the Muslim world. Specifically, he estimated that in 1770, of about 10.6 million Muslims in Bengal, 3.3 million (about 30 per cent) had 'foreign blood'. In the late 1980s Richard Eaton, in a book and a series of papers, raised awkward questions about the social liberation theory of conversion from Hinduism to Islam that have yet to be fully addressed, further endorsing Rahim's argument. In the late 19th century, when the first census was conducted on Bengal region in the year of (1872), it was found that the number of Hindus are at (18m) and Muslims at (17.5m) were almost the same. According to the 1872 Census, only 1.52% or say 2.66 lakhs of the Bengali Muslim population claimed foreign ancestry.

=== British colonial period ===
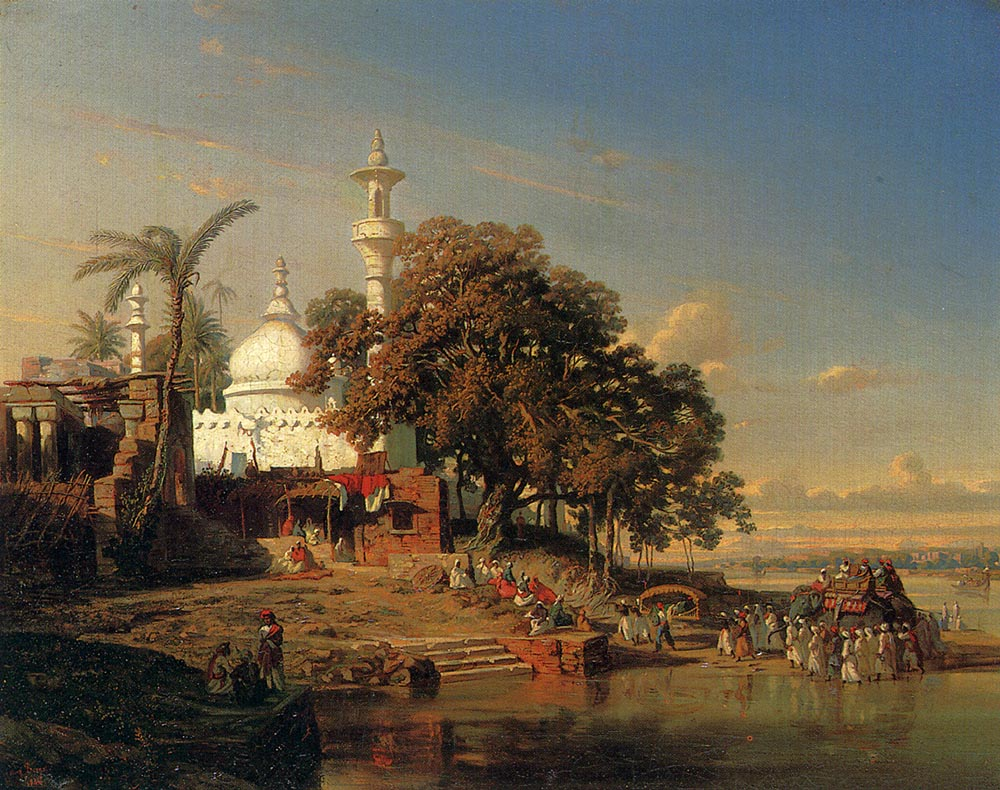
A mosque on the banks of the Hooghly River near Kolkata.

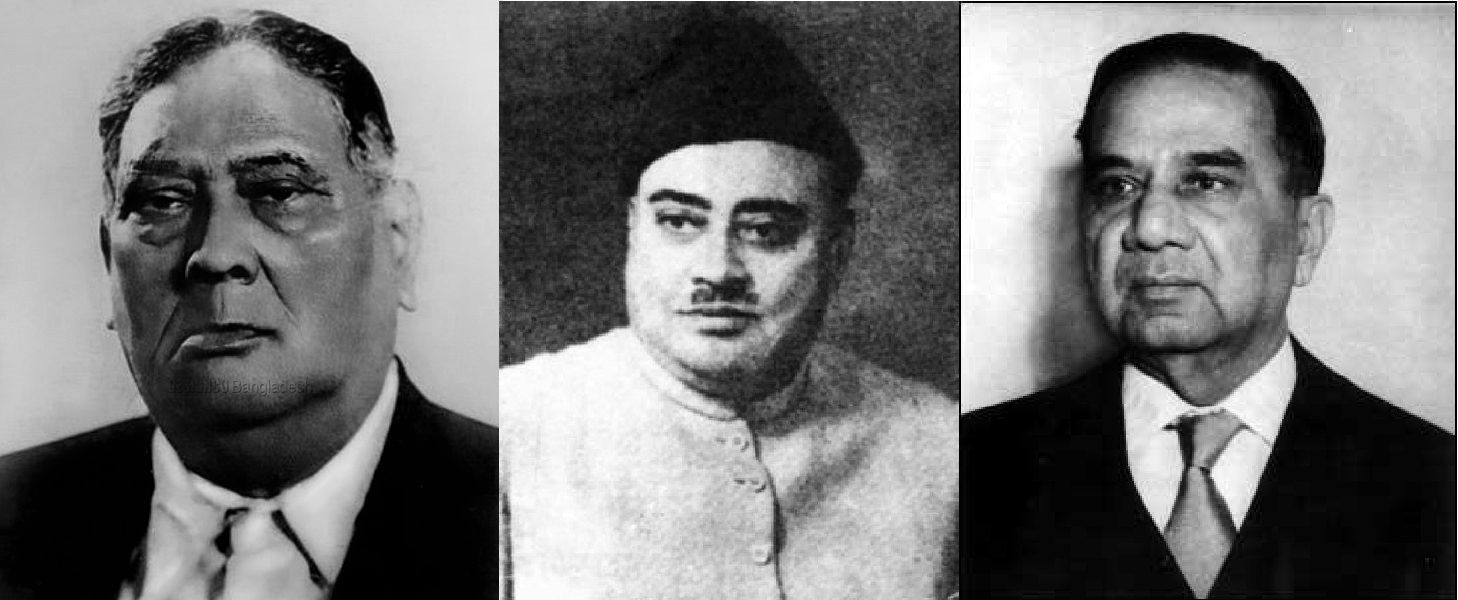
The Prime Ministers of British Bengal were from the Muslim community of the Bengal Presidency

The Bengal region was annexed by the East India Company (EIC) in 1757. In the following decades, Bengalis led numerous revolts against Company rule. In the early 19th century, Titumir led a peasant uprising against the East India Company. Meanwhile, the Bengali Muslim Haji Shariatullah led the Faraizi movement, which advocated Islamic revivalism. The Faraizis sought to create a caliphate and cleanse the region's Muslim society of what they deemed "un-Islamic practices". They were successful in galvanising the Bengali peasantry against the EIC. However, the movement experienced a crackdown after the suppression of the Indian Rebellion of 1857 and lost impetus after the death of Haji Shariatullah's son Dudu Miyan.

After 1870, Muslims began a seeking British-style education in increasingly larger numbers. Under the leadership of Sir Syed Ahmed Khan the promotion the English language among Muslims of India also influenced Bengali Muslim society. Social and cultural leaders among Bengali Muslims during this period included Munshi Mohammad Meherullah, who countered Christian missionaries, writers Ismail Hossain Siraji and Mir Mosharraf Hossain; and feminists Nawab Faizunnesa and Rokeya Sakhawat Hossain.

==== Eastern Bengal and Assam (1905–1912) ====
A precursor to the modern state of Bangladesh was the province of Eastern Bengal and Assam in British India. The province was created on 16 October 1905 by the Viceroy of India Lord Curzon. The province covered present-day Bangladesh, northeastern India and a part of West Bengal. It had a Bengali Muslim majority. Dacca, the former Mughal capital of Bengal, was declared by the British as the capital of Eastern Bengal and Assam. The province was established through the first partition of Bengal. The British government cited administrative reasons for the creation of the new province. It promised increased investment in education and the economy of the new province. The partition galvanised Muslim nationalism in South Asia and led to the formation of the All India Muslim League in Dacca in 1906. It also stoked anti-Muslim sentiment and anti-British sentiment among Hindus. Growing opposition from the Indian National Congress, which accused the British of a divide and rule policy, caused the British government to reconsider the new provincial geography. During the Delhi Durbar in 1911, King George V announced that provinces would once again be reorganised. The first partition of Bengal was annulled; while Calcutta lost its status as the imperial capital of India. The imperial capital was shifted to New Delhi; while Calcutta became the capital of a reunited, albeit smaller, Bengal province. Assam was made a separate province. Orissa and Bihar were also separated from Bengal. As a compensation for Dacca, the British government established a university for the city in 1921.

During the short lifespan of the province, school enrolment increased by 20%. New subjects were introduced into the college curriculum, including Persian, Sanskrit, mathematics, history and algebra. All towns became connected by an inter-district road network. The population of the capital city Dacca rose by 21% between 1906 and 1911.

In the late 19th and early 20th centuries, the British promoted the settlement of Muslim cultivators from densely populated East Bengal to farm untilled lands in Assam and other places. Therefore, large numbers of Bengali Muslims from Mymensingh, Pabna and Rangpur districts were incentivised to come to lower Assam where there was cheap land available.

=== 1947 Partition and Bangladesh ===
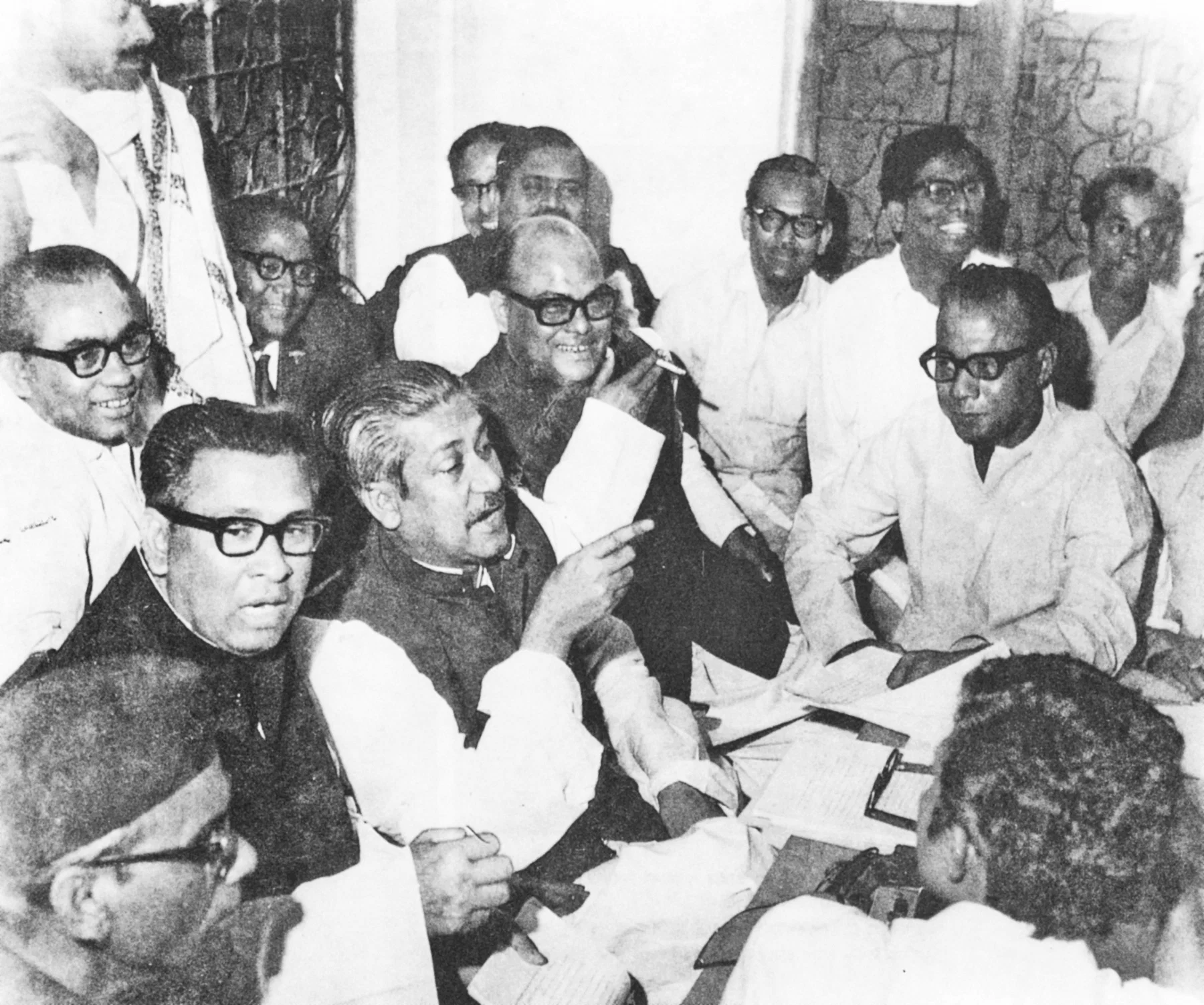
Awami League leaders Sheikh Mujibur Rahman, Tajuddin Ahmad, Syed Nazrul Islam and others in 1970

An important moment in the history of Bengali self-determination was the Lahore Resolution in 1940, which was promoted by politician A. K. Fazlul Huq. The resolution initially called for the creation of a sovereign state in the "Eastern Zone" of British India. However, its text was later changed by the top leadership of the Muslim League. The Prime Minister of Bengal Huseyn Shaheed Suhrawardy proposed an independent, undivided, sovereign "Free State of Bengal" in 1947. Despite calls from liberal Bengali Muslim League leaders for an independent United Bengal, the British government moved forward with the Partition of Bengal in 1947. The Radcliffe Line made East Bengal a part of the Dominion of Pakistan. It was later renamed as East Pakistan, with Dhaka as its capital.

The East Pakistan Awami Muslim League was formed in Dhaka in 1949. The organisation's name was later secularised as the Awami League in 1955 with the support o Maulana Bhasani. The party was supported by the Bengali bourgeoisie, agriculturalists, the middle class, and the intelligentsia.

Sir Khawaja Nazimuddin, Mohammad Ali of Bogra, and H. S. Suhrawardy, all of whom were Bengali Muslims, each served as Pakistan's prime minister during the 1950s; however, all three were deposed by the military-industrial complex in West Pakistan. The Bengali language movement in 1952 received strong support from Islamic groups, including the Tamaddun Majlish. Bengali nationalism increased in East Pakistan during the 1960s, particularly with the Six point movement for autonomy. The rise of pro-democracy and pro-independence movements in East Pakistan, with Sheikh Mujibur Rahman as the principal leader, led to the Bangladesh Liberation War in 1971.

Bangladesh was founded as a secular Muslim majority nation. In 1977, however, President Ziaur Rahman, trying to consolidate his power under martial law, removed secularism from the constitution and replaced it with "a commitment to the values of Islam." In 2010, the Bangladesh Supreme Court reaffirmed secular principles in the constitution.

== Science and technology ==
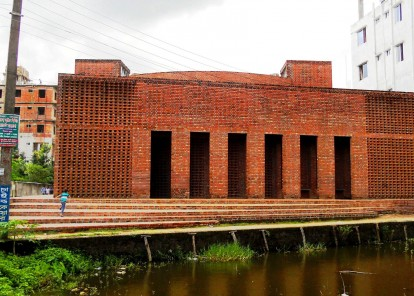
The award-winning modernist Bait Ur Rouf Mosque

Historical Islamic kingdoms that existed in Bengal employed several clever technologies in numerous areas such as architecture, agriculture, civil engineering, water management, etc. The creation of canals and reservoirs was a common practice for the sultanate. New methods of irrigation were pioneered by the Sufis. Bengali mosque architecture featured terracotta, stone, wood and bamboo, with curved roofs, corner towers and multiple domes. During the Bengal Sultanate, a distinct regional style flourished which featured no minarets, but had richly designed mihrabs and minbars as niches.

Islamic Bengal had a long history of textile weaving, including export of muslin during the 17th and 18th centuries. Today, the weaving of Jamdani is classified by UNESCO as an intangible cultural heritage.

Modern science was begun in Bengal during the period of British colonial rule. Railways were introduced in 1862, making Bengal one of the earliest regions in the world to have a rail network. For the general population, opportunities for formal science education remained limited. The colonial government and the Bengali elite established several institutes for science education. The Nawabs of Dhaka established Ahsanullah School of Engineering which later became the Bangladesh University of Engineering and Technology. Qazi Azizul Haque pioneered fingerprint classification.

In the second half of the 20th century, the Bengali Muslim American Fazlur Rahman Khan became one of the most important structural engineers in the world, helping design the world's tallest buildings. Another Bengali Muslim German-American, Jawed Karim, was the co-founder of YouTube.

In 2016, the modernist Bait-ur-Rouf Mosque, inspired by the Bengal Sultanate-style of buildings, won the Aga Khan Award for Architecture.

== Demographics ==
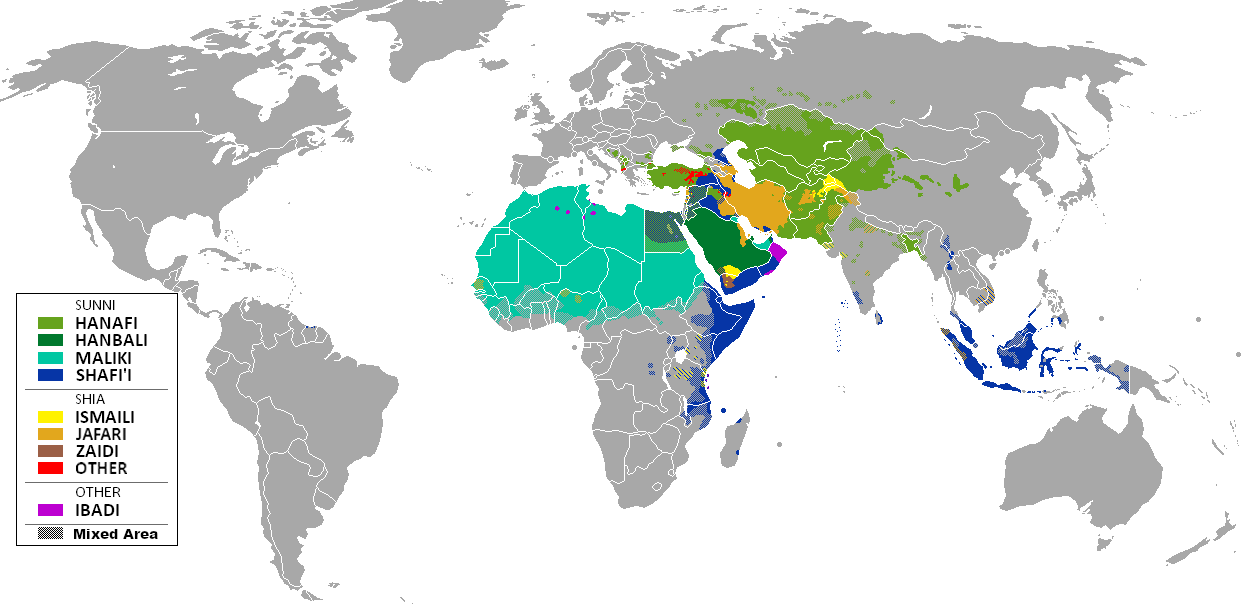
Areas of the Hanafi school are shaded in light green

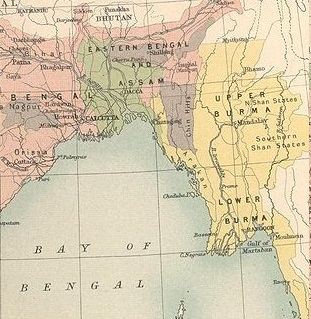
East Bengal's Muslim majority areas highlighted in green on a religious demography map of British India, 1909

Bengali Muslims constitute the world's second-largest Muslim ethnicity (after the Arab world) and the largest Muslim community in South Asia. An estimated 153 million Bengali Muslims live in Bangladesh as of 2020, where Islam commands the demographic majority. The Indian state of West Bengal is home to an estimated 23-24 million Bengali Muslims as per 2021 estimation, rest 6-7 million Muslims are Urdu and Surjapuri speaking Muslims. Two districts in West Bengal – Murshidabad and Maldah have a Muslim majority and North Dinajpur has a plurality. The Indian state of Assam has over 9 million Bengali Muslims out of 13 million Muslim population in Assam. Nine out of thirty-three districts in Assam have a Muslim majority. Tripura, a north-eastern state of India has around 3.8 lakh Bengali Muslim population, or say 9% as of 2021. The Rohingya community in western Myanmar have significant Bengali Muslim heritage.

A large Bengali Muslim diaspora is found in the Arab states of the Persian Gulf, which are home to several million expatriate workers from South Asia. A more well-established diaspora also resides in the United States, Canada, the United Kingdom, and Pakistan. The first Bengali Muslim settlers in the United States were ship jumpers who settled in Harlem, New York and Baltimore, Maryland in the 1920s and 1930s.

== Culture ==
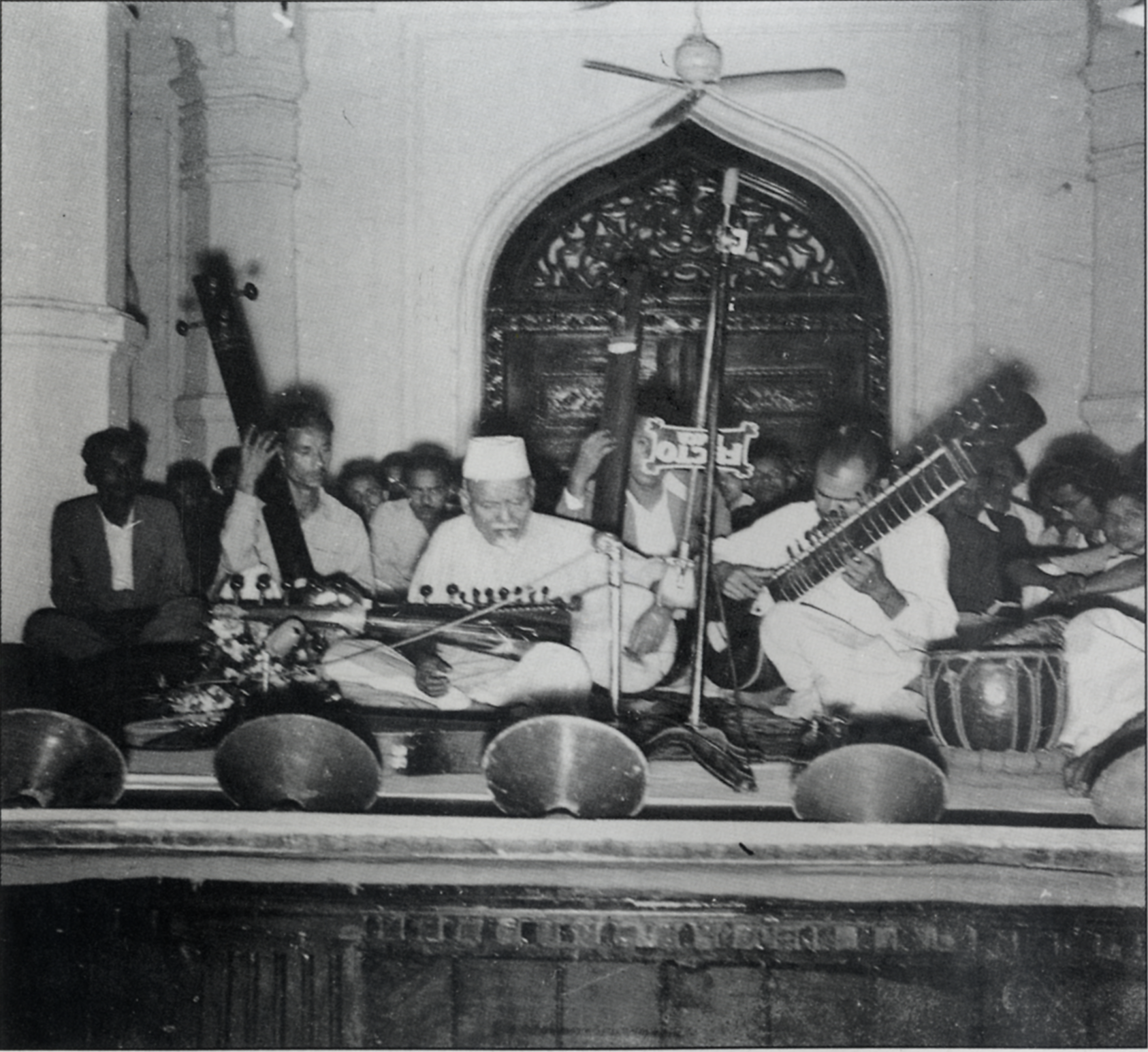
Ustad Alauddin Khan (centre), one of the greatest maestros of South Asian classical music, performing with his ensemble at Curzon Hall in Dhaka, 1955

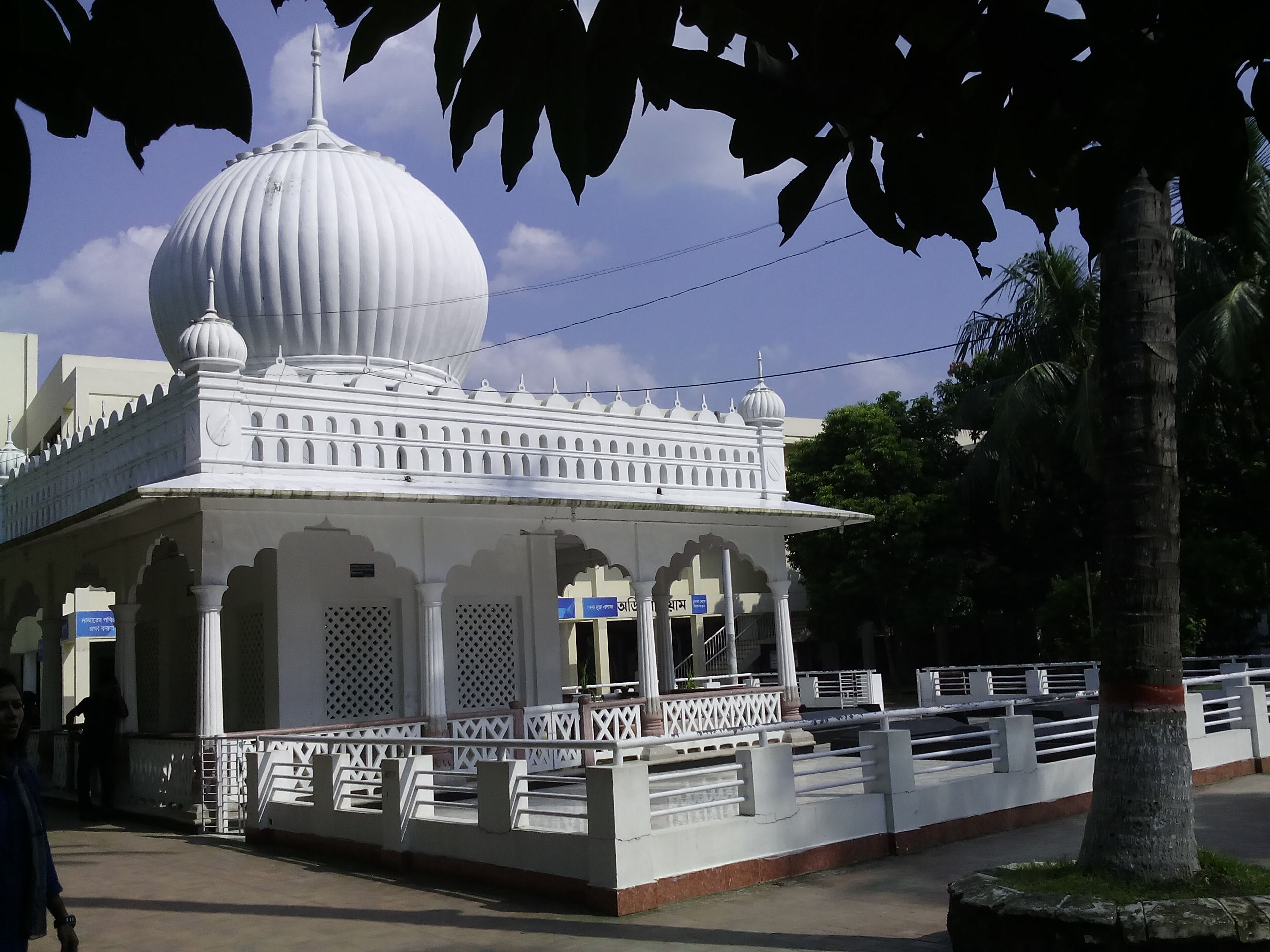
Mausoleum of Lalon Shah, a syncretic Baul poet inspired by Sufism

=== Surnames ===
Surnames in Bengali Muslim society reflect the region's cosmopolitan history. They are mainly of Arabic and Persian origin, with a minority of Bengali surnames.

==== Art ====
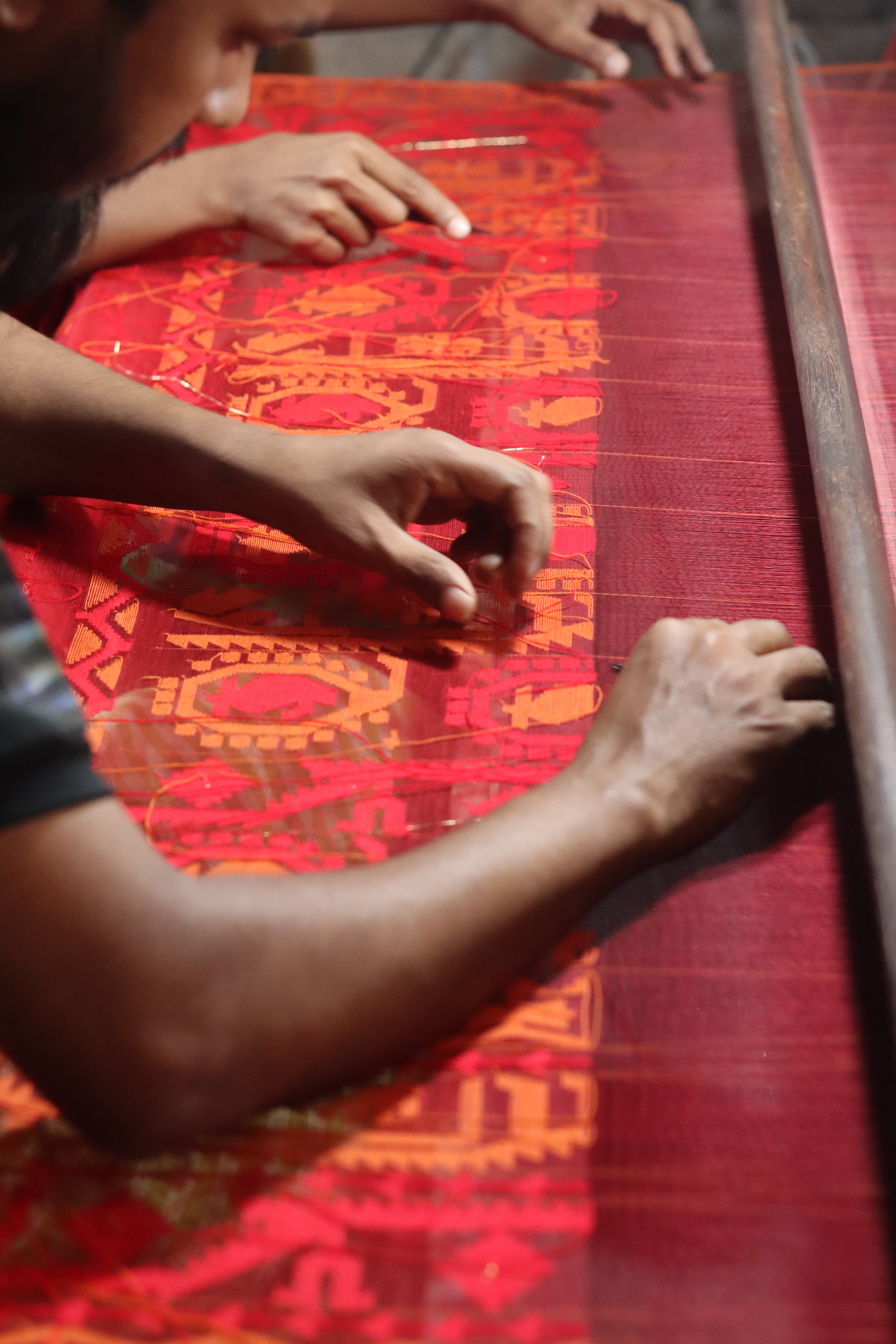
Jamdani weaving

Zainul Abedin, who's better known as Shilpacharya (Master of Art) was a prominent painter. His famine sketches of the 1940s are his most remarkable works of all time.

The unique trend of rickshaw art started from major cities of Bangladesh like Rajshahi and Dhaka and took its own style in each district. Chittagong being a more pious city than Dhaka mostly had floral or scenery art whereas Comilla has plain rickshaws with beautiful blue and green hoods, on which are sewn an appliqué of a minaret or floral design enshrining the word "Allah" which means "God" in Arabic. Rickshaw and rickshaw painting of Bangladesh are listed as 'intangible heritage' by UNESCO. As a people's craft, of Bengal cloth architecture has seen transformation in the past decade for open-air public functions such as melas and religious gatherings like urs and waz-mahfil and Eidgahs for Eid prayers.

The Patua of Bangladesh are a unique community, in that their traditional occupation is the painting which is known as Patachitra and modelling of Hindu idols, yet many of them are Muslims. Gazir Pata (scroll of Gazi Pir) is the most famous scroll painting made by Bengali Patuas.

The weaving industry of Bengal has prospered with the help of the Muslims natives. The Bengali origin Jamdani is believed to be a fusion of the ancient cloth-making techniques of Bengal with the muslins produced by Bengali Muslims of Dhaka since the 14th century. Jamdani is the most expensive product of traditional Bengali looms since it requires the most lengthy and dedicated work. The traditional art of weaving jamdani was declared a UNESCO Intangible Cultural Heritage of Humanity in 2013 and Bangladesh received geographical indication (GI) status for Jamdani Sari in 2016.

Sheikh Zainuddin was a prominent Bengali Muslim artist in the 18th century during the colonial period. His works were inspired by the style of Mughal courts.

=== Architecture ===
An indigenous style of Islamic architecture flourished in Bengal during the medieval Sultanate period. Traditional Bengali Islamic architecture includes elements like brick, floral terracotta and stone craftsmanship. Mosques with multiple domes are proliferated in the region. Bengali Islamic architecture emerged as a synthesis of Bengali, Persian, Byzantine, and Mughal elements.

The Indo-Saracenic style influenced Islamic architecture in South Asia during the British Raj. Notable examples of this style are Curzon Hall and High Court Building in Dhaka.

East Pakistan was the centre of the Bengali modernist movement started by Muzharul Islam. Many renowned global architects worked in the region during the 1960s, which are still prevalent in modern-day Bangladesh.

=== Sufism ===
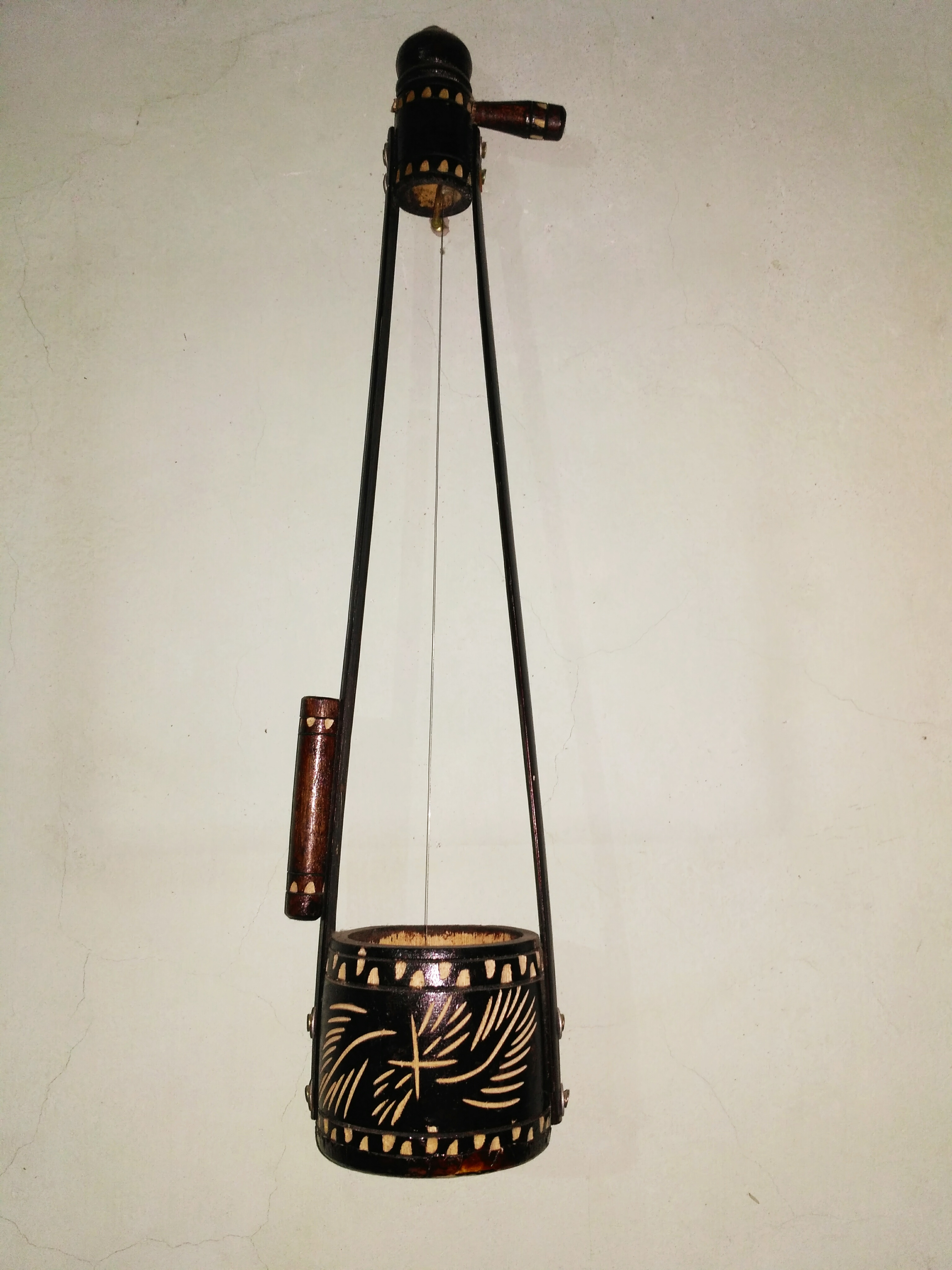
Ektara - An instrument used by Baul singers

Sufi spiritual traditions are central to the Bengali Muslim way of life. The most common Sufi ritual is the Dhikr, the practice of repeating the names of God after prayers. Sufi teachings regard the Muhammad as the primary perfect man who exemplifies the morality of God. Sufism is regarded as the individual internalisation and intensification of the Islamic faith and practice. The Sufis played a vital role in developing Bengali Muslim society during the medieval period. Historic Sufi missionaries are regarded as saints, including Shah Jalal, Khan Jahan Ali, Shah Amanat, Shah Makhdum Rupos and Khwaja Enayetpuri. Their mausoleums are focal points for charity, religious congregations, and festivities.

Baul is a Bengali mendicant folk sect influenced by concepts of Sufism. Baul songs may be sung at Baul akhdas or in the open air. At akhdas, songs are sung in the style of hamd (song in praise of God), ghazal or nat (song in praise of the Islamic prophet Muhammad). Baul singers often play instruments such as ektara, dugdugi, khamak, dholak, sarinda, and dotara.

==== Syncretism ====
As part of the conversion process, a syncretic version of mystical Sufi Islam was historically prevalent in medieval and early modern Bengal. The Islamic concept of tawhid was diluted into the veneration of Hindu folk deities, who were now regarded as pirs. Folk deities such as Shitala (goddess of smallpox) and Oladevi (goddess of cholera) were worshipped as pirs among the poorer sections of Muslim society. These practices have almost entirely died out with the spread of Islamic revivalism throughout regions where Bengali Muslims live.

=== Language ===
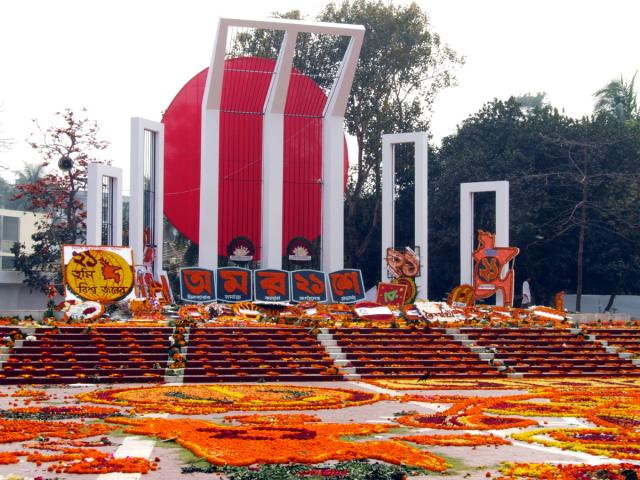
Shaheed Minar (Martyr Monument), at the University of Dhaka in Bangladesh, commemorates those who were killed on 21 February 1952 Bengali Language Movement demonstration.

Bengali Muslims maintain their indigenous language with its native script. This tradition is similar to that of Central Asian and Chinese Muslims.

Bengali evolved as the most easterly branch of the Indo-European languages. The Bengal Sultanate promoted the literary development of Bengali over Sanskrit, apparently to solidify their political legitimacy among the local populace. Bengali was the primary vernacular language of the Sultanate. Bengali borrowed a considerable amount of vocabulary from Arabic and Persian. Under the Mughal Empire, considerable autonomy was enjoyed in the Bengali literary sphere. The Bengali Language Movement of 1952 was a key part of East Pakistan's nationalist movement. It is commemorated annually by UNESCO as International Mother Language Day on 21 February.

=== Literature ===
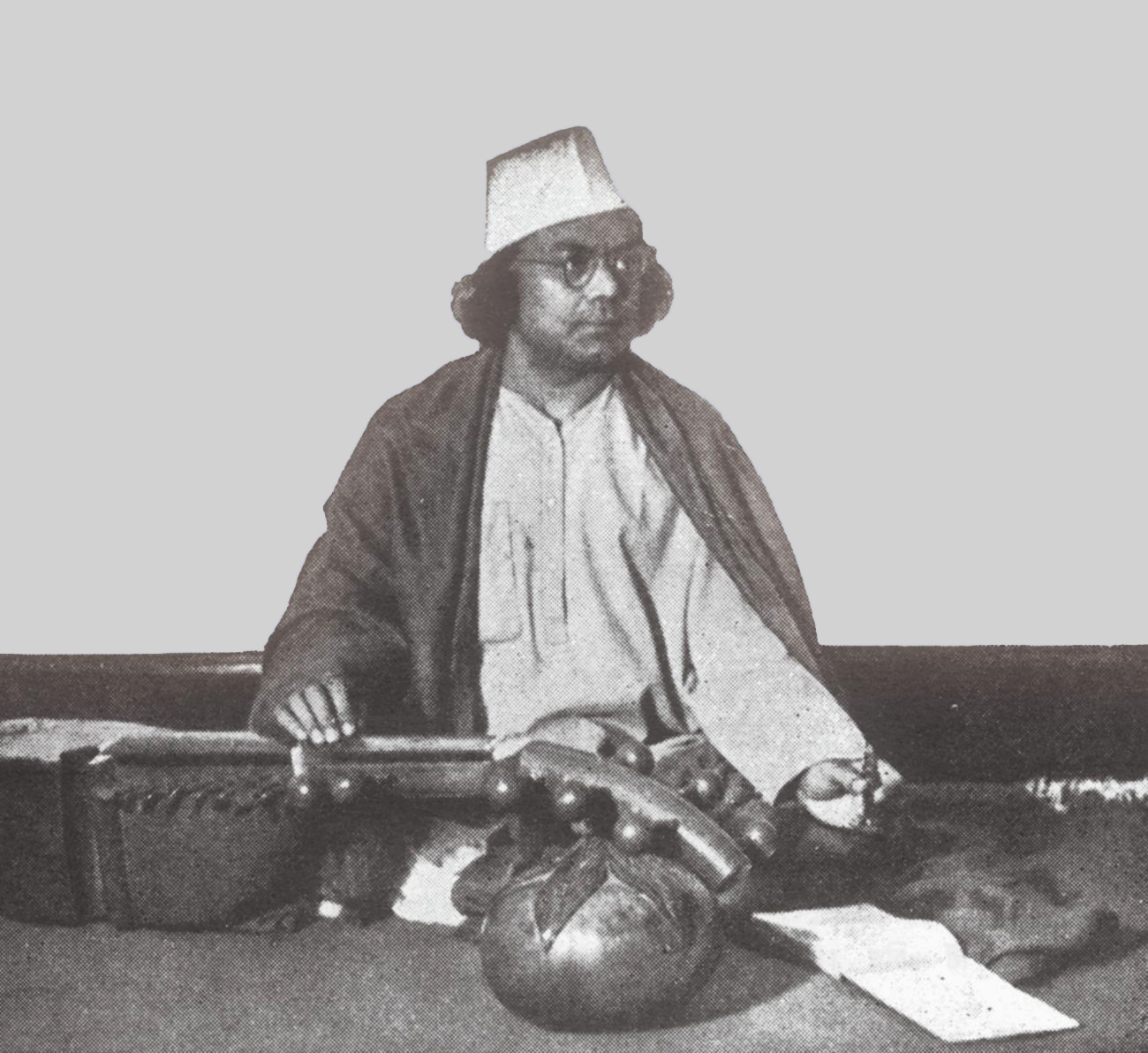
Kazi Nazrul Islam, the national poet of Bangladesh

While proto-Bengali emerged during the pre-Islamic period, the Bengali literary tradition crystallised during the Islamic period. As Persian and Arabic were prestige languages, they significantly influenced vernacular Bengali literature. The first efforts to popularise Bengali among Muslim writers was by the Sufi poet Nur Qutb Alam. The poet established the Rikhta tradition which saw poems written in half Persian and half colloquial Bengali. The invocation tradition saw Bengali Muslim poets re-adapting Indian epics by replacing invocations of Hindu gods and goddesses with figures of Islam. The romantic tradition was pioneered by Shah Muhammad Sagir, whose work on Yusuf and Zulaikha was widely popular among the people of Bengal. Other notable romantic works included Layla Madjunn by Bahram Khan and Hanifa Kayrapari by Sabirid Khan. The Dobhashi tradition features the use of Arabic and Persian vocabulary in Bengali texts to illustrate Muslim contexts. Medieval Bengali Muslim writers produced epic poetry and elegies, such as Rasul Vijay of Shah Barid, Nabibangsha of Syed Sultan, Janganama of Abdul Hakim and Maktul Hussain of Mohammad Khan. Cosmology was a popular subject among Sufi writers. In the 17th century, Bengali Muslim writers such as Alaol found refuge in Arakan where he produced his epic, Padmavati.

Bengal was also a major centre of Persian literature. Several newspapers and thousands of books, documents and manuscripts were published in Persian for 600 years. The Persian poet Hafez dedicated an ode to the literature of Bengal while corresponding with Sultan Ghiyasuddin Azam Shah.

The first Bengali Muslim novelist was Mir Mosharraf Hossain in the 19th century. The highly acclaimed poetry of Kazi Nazrul Islam espoused spiritual rebellion against fascism and oppression. Nazrul also wrote Bengali ghazals. Begum Rokeya was a pioneering Bengali female writer who published Sultana's Dream, one of the earliest examples of feminist science fiction. The Muslim Literary Society of Bengal was founded by free-thinking and progressive teachers of Dacca University under the chairmanship of Dr. Muhammad Shahidullah on 19 January 1926. The Freedom of Intellect Movement was championed by the society. When Bengal was partitioned in 1947, a distinct literary culture evolved in East Pakistan and modern Bangladesh. Shamsur Rahman was regarded as the country's poet laureate. Jasimuddin became noted for poems and songs reflecting life in rural Bengal and was given the title "Polli Kobi". Al Mahmud was considered one of the greatest Bengali poets to have emerged in the 20th century. Humayun Ahmed promoted the Bangladeshi field of magical realism. Akhtaruzzaman Elias was noted for his works set in Old Dhaka. Tahmima Anam has been a noted writer of Bangladeshi English literature.

==== Literary societies ====
- Kendriyo Muslim Sahitya Sangsad
- Muslim Sahitya-Samaj
- Bangiya Mussalman Sahitya Samiti
- Bangiya Sahitya Bisayini Mussalman Samiti
- Mohammedan Literary Society
- Purba Pakistan Sahitya Sangsad
- Pakistan Sahitya Sangsad, 1952
- Uttar Banga Sahitya Sammilani
- Rangapur Sahitya Parisad

==== Literary magazines ====
- Begum
- Mussalman Sahitya Patrika
- Saogat

=== Music ===
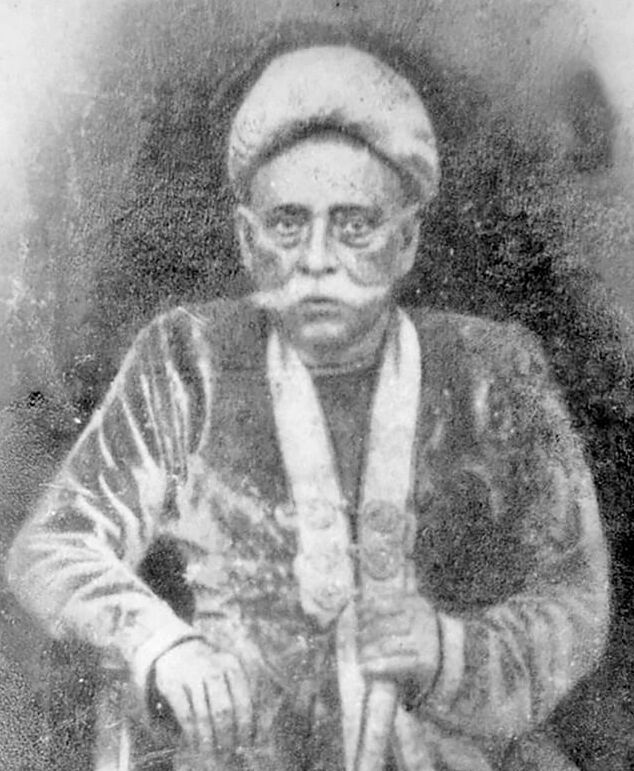
Hason Raja was a mystic Muslim poet whose songs are widely popular in the region

A notable feature of Bengali Muslim music is the syncretic Baul tradition. The leading iconic practitioner of Baul tradition was Fakir Lalon Shah. Baul music is included in the UNESCO Masterpieces of the Oral and Intangible Heritage of Humanity.

Nazrul Sangeet is the collection of 4,000 songs and ghazals written by Kazi Nazrul Islam.

South Asian classical music is widely prevalent in the region. Alauddin Khan, Ali Akbar Khan, and Gul Mohammad Khan were notable Bengali Muslim exponents of classical music.

In the field of modern music Runa Laila became widely acclaimed for her musical talents across South Asia.

=== Cuisine ===
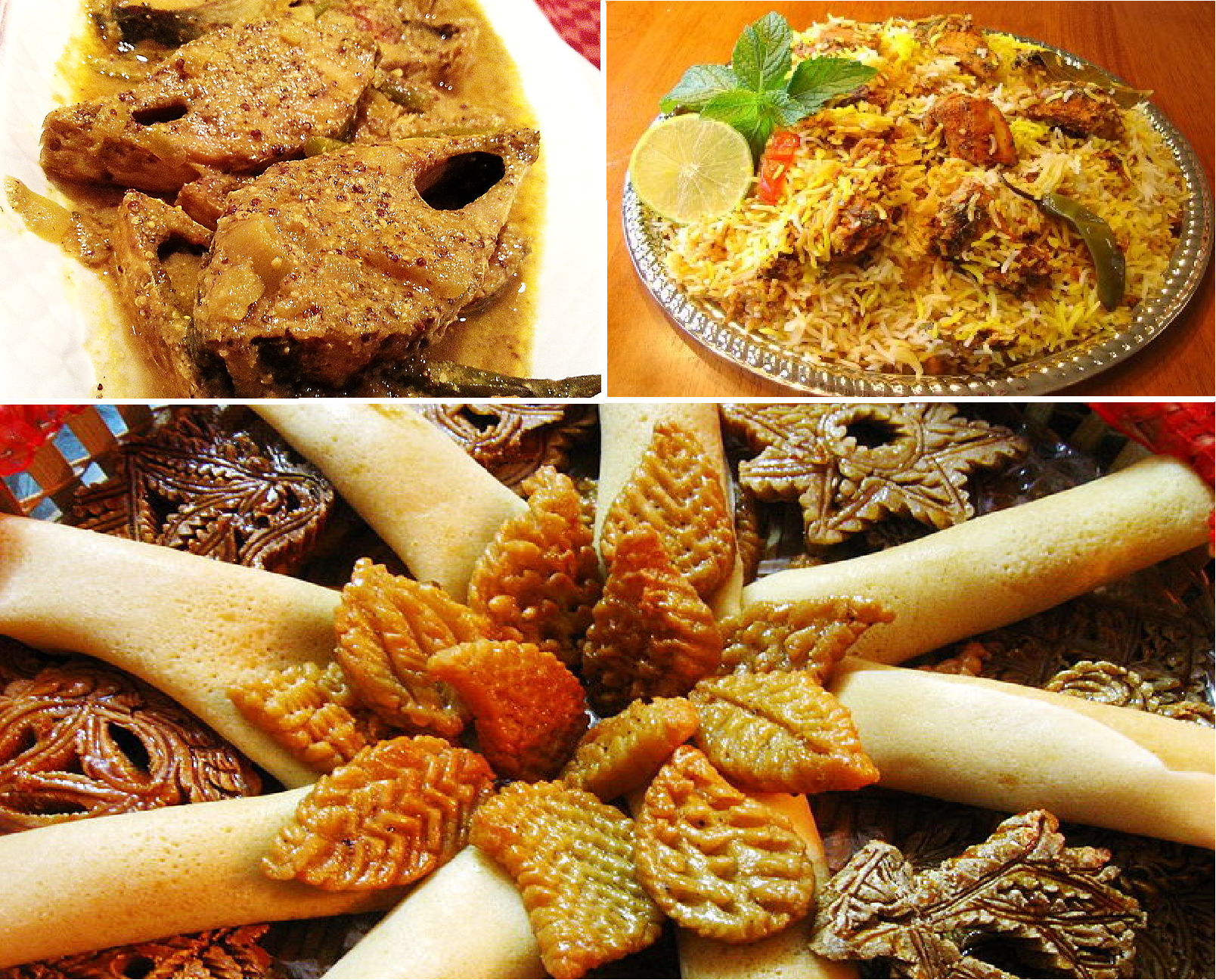
Iconic Bengali dishes from Bangladesh. Shorshe Ilish, Kacchi Biryani and Pitha

The Mughal influence in Bengali Cuisine led to an increase in the use of milk and sugar in sweet dishes like Rasmalai of Cumilla, Sandesh of Shatkhira, Malai Chomchom of Tangail, Mishti Doi of Bogra, Muktagachhar monda, Roshkodom of Rajshahi and Chhanamukhi of Brahmanbaria. Uses of Cream (Malai), Mutton, chicken and ghee and spices like cardamom and saffron has increased due to the heavy Mughal influence.

Dhaka, the capital of Mughal Bengal and present day capital of Bangladesh, has been the epitome of Perso-Bengali and Arab-Bengali cuisines. Within Bengali cuisine, Muslim dishes include the serving of meat curries, pulao rice, various biryani preparations, and dry and dairy-based desserts alongside traditional fish and vegetables. Bakarkhani breads from Dhaka were once immensely popular in the imperial court of the Mughal Empire. Other major breads consumed today include naan and paratha. In present-day Bangladesh the Mughal-influenced foods are immensely popular such as Shuti Kabab, Kala bhuna, Korma, Rôst, Mughlai Paratha, Jali Kabab, Shami Kabab, Akhni, Tehari, Tanduri Chicken, Kofta, Firni and Shingara. Different types of Bengali biryani and pilaf include the Kachi (mutton), Illish pulao (hilsa), Tehari (beef), and Murg Pulao (chicken). Mezban is a renowned spicy beef curry from Chittagong. Regional varieties include delicacies like Bakarkhani, Shahi jilapi, Haji biryani, Borhani of Dhaka, Kala bhuna, Gosht, Durus kura, Nakshi Pitha of Chittagong and Akhni, Duck Bamboo Curry, Hutki shira of Sylhet. Halwa, Falooda, Kulfi, pithas, yogurt (such as Curd of Bogra and Mishti Doi), and shemai are typical Muslim desserts in Bengali cuisine. In the Bengali majority country of Bangladesh, people prefer to eat more spicy food rather than sweet comparing to West Bengal. Iconic Bengali dishes like Shorshe Ilish, Kala bhuna, Bhurta, Shutki Shira, Chingri Malaikari, Machher Jhol, Machher Paturi and Kacchi Biryani has their origins in Bangladesh. Bengali dishes like Shemai, Chotpoti, Handesh, Nunbora and Pithas are part of the Bengali celebration of Eid al-Fitr. Bangladeshi cuisine is a great example of Muslim culture of Bengali cuisine as meat is more common among Bangladeshis.

=== Festivals ===
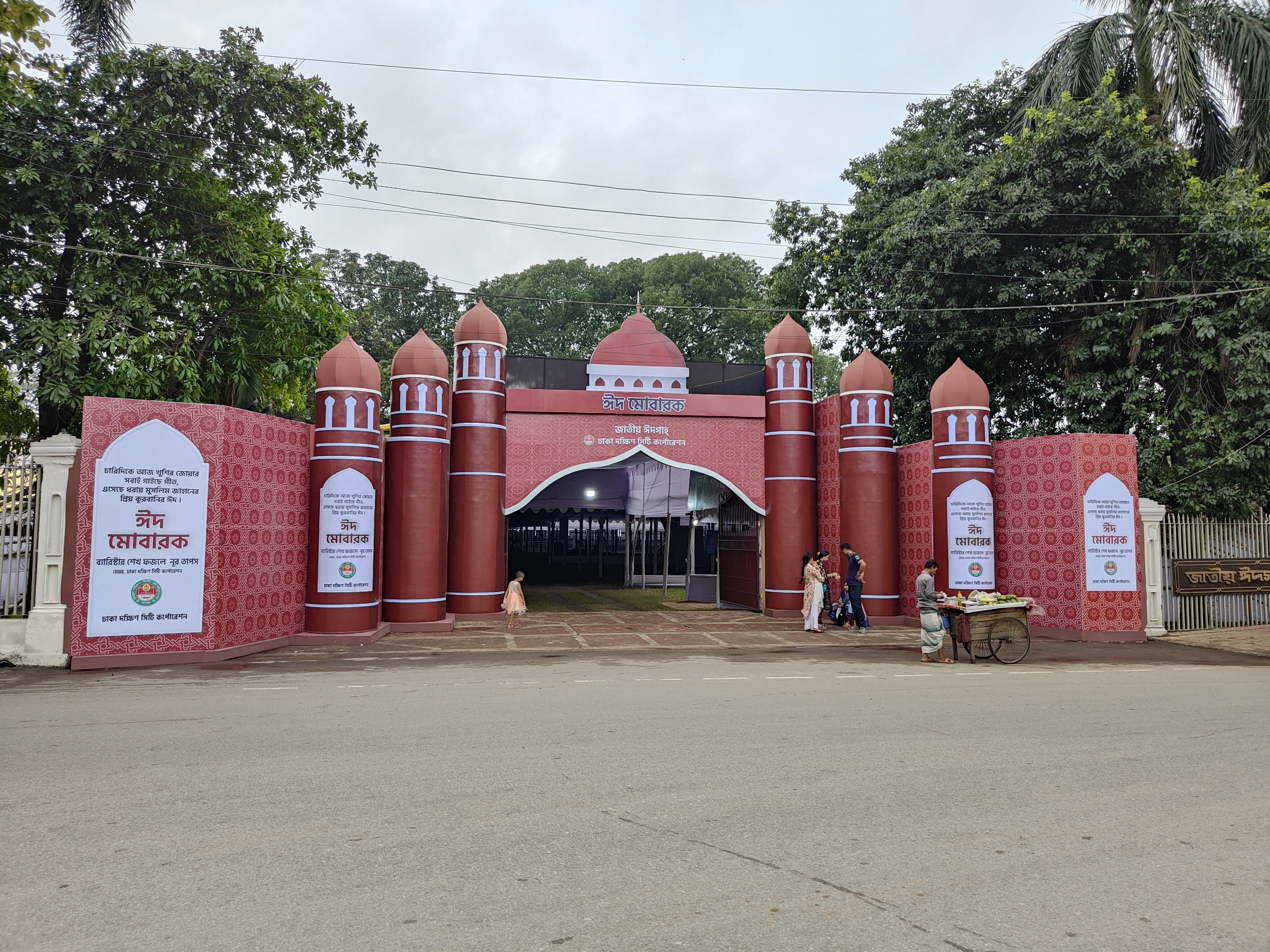
National Eidgah of Bangladesh decorated in the occasion of Eid

According to a famous Bengali proverb, there are thirteen festivals in twelve months (Bengali: বারো মাসে তেরো পার্বণ, romanized: Bārō māsē tērō pārbaṇa). Eid-ul-Fitr at the end of Ramadan is the largest religious festival among Bengali Muslims. The festival of sacrifice takes place during Eid-al-Adha, with cows and goats as the main sacrificial animals. Muharram and Muhammad's birthday are national holidays in Bangladesh. During Muharram, Bengali Muslims enjoys the Jari gan and Lathi Khela. The biggest Jashne Julus happens in Chittagong. After Milad mehfil, Bengali Muslims distribute sweets such as Pantua, Chomchom, kalojam, Moa, Naru and Roshogolla. Other festivals like Shab-e-Barat feature prayers and exchange of Bengali sweets such as Sandesh, Barfi and Halwa and many other festivities especially by Dhakaiyas. Pohela Boishakh is the biggest celebration in Bangladesh which was founded by the Bengali Muslim Mahifarash community in Old Dhaka. The day marked by Mangal Shobhajatra, Boishakhi Mela, Borshoboron celebration by Chhayanaut in Ramna Batamul and tradition meals like Panta Ilish and Bhurta. Dhaka has this kite festival called Shakrain. Other festivals like Pohela Falgun, Nouka Baich, Borsha Mongol, Haal Khata, Nabanna, Rabindra Jayanti and Nazrul Jayanti are celebrated with great care.

==== Bishwa Ijtema ====
The Bishwa Ijtema, organised annually in Bangladesh, is the second-largest Islamic congregation after the Hajj. It was founded by the orthodox Sunni Tablighi Jamaat movement in 1954.

== Leadership ==
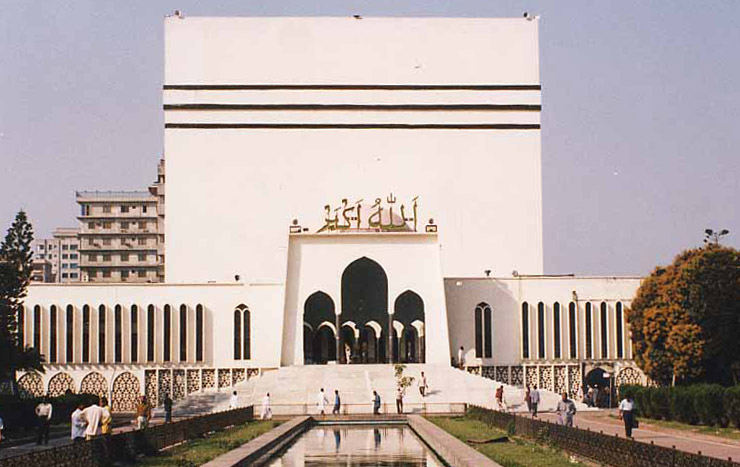
Baitul Mukarram, the national mosque of Bangladesh and the headquarters of the nation's Islamic Foundation

There is no single governing body for the Bengali Muslim community, nor a single authority with responsibility for religious doctrine. However, the semi-autonomous Islamic Foundation, a government institution, plays an important role in Islamic affairs in Bangladesh, including setting festival dates and matters related to zakat. The general Bengali Muslim clergy remains deeply orthodox and conservative. Members of the clergy include Mawlānās, Imams, Ulamas, and Muftis.

The clergy of the Bengali Muslim Shia minority have been based in the old quarter of Dhaka since the 18th century.

== Notable individuals ==
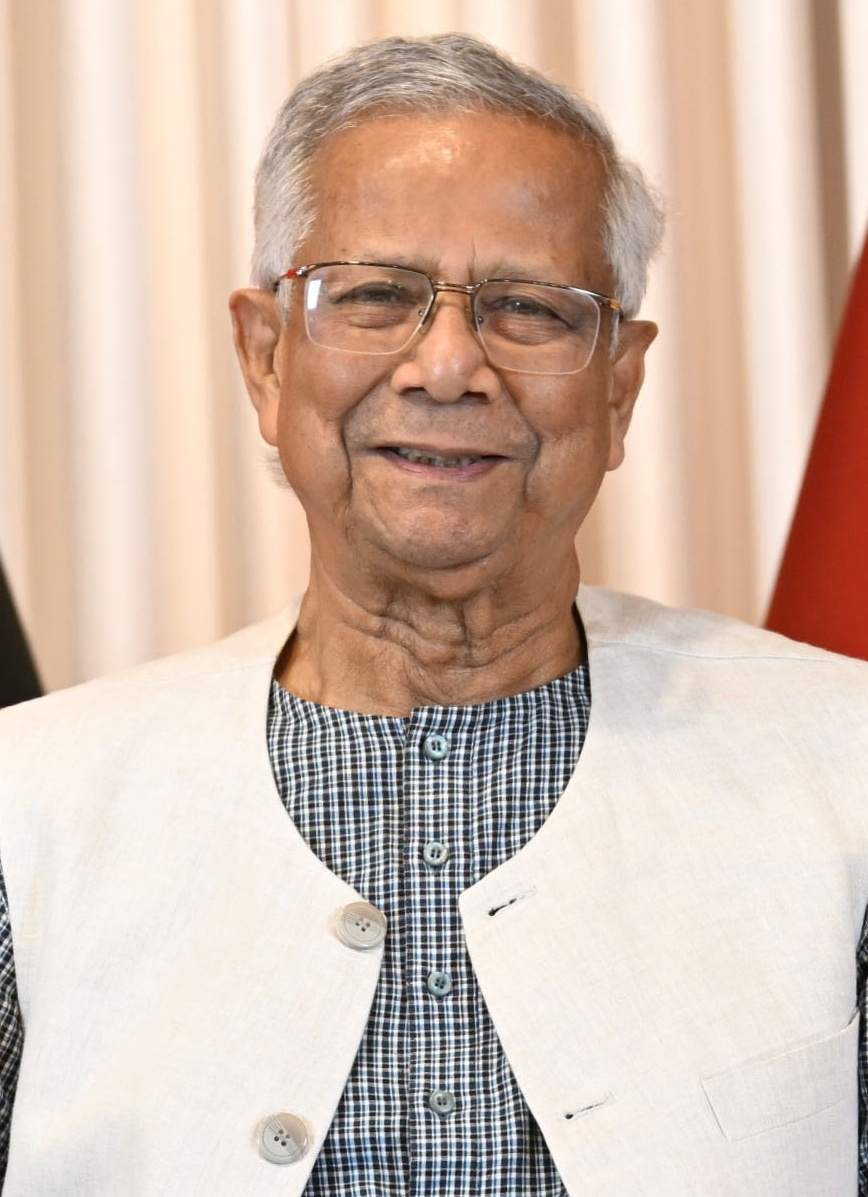
Muhammad Yunus, winner of the 2006 Nobel Peace Prize

Muhammad Yunus is the first Bengali Muslim Nobel laureate who was awarded the Nobel Peace Prize for founding the Grameen Bank and pioneering the concepts of microcredit and microfinance. Begum Rokeya was one of the world's first Muslim feminists. Kazi Nazrul Islam was renowned as the Rebel Poet of British India and the National Poet of Bangladesh. Sheikh Mujibur Rahman was the first President of Bangladesh. On 14 April, the final day, which was also the Pohela Boishakh, the BBC announced Sheikh Mujibur Rahman, as the Greatest Bengali of All Time voted by Bengalis worldwide. Iskander Mirza was the first president of the Islamic Republic of Pakistan. Khwaja Salimullah was one of the founders of the All-India Muslim League. A. K. Fazlul Huq was the first Prime Minister of undivided Bengal, Chief Minister of East Bengal, Interior Minister of Pakistan. Rushanara Ali was the amongst the first Muslim MPs in the House of Commons of the United Kingdom. Fazlur Rahman Khan was a prominent American Bengali Muslim engineer who brought in spectacular changes in design of modern skyscraper construction. Jawed Karim is one of the co-founders of YouTube. Sal Khan is a co-founder of Khan Academy. Humayun Rashid Choudhury served as President of the United Nations General Assembly. M. A. G. Osmani was a four star general who founded the Bangladesh Armed Forces. Altamas Kabir was the Chief Justice of India. Nafisa Ali are prominent Bengali Muslims who act in Indian cinema. Alaol was a medieval Bengali Muslim poet who worked in the royal court of Arakan. Mohammad Ali Bogra served as the Prime Minister of Pakistan. Begum Sufia Kamal was a leading Bengali Muslim feminist, poet, and civil society leader. Zainul Abedin was the pioneer of modern Bangladeshi art. Muzharul Islam was the grand master of South Asian modernist terracotta architecture.

== See also ==
- Culture of Bengal

Other Bengali religious groups

- Bengali Hindus
- Bengali Buddhists
- Bengali Christians

== Bibliography ==
- Ahmed, Rafiuddin (1996). The Bengal Muslims, 1871–1906: a quest for identity. Oxford University Press. ISBN 978-0-19-563919-3.
- Ahmed, Rafiuddin (2001). Understanding the Bengal Muslims: interpretative essays. Oxford University Press. ISBN 978-0-19-565520-9.
- Chakraborty, Ashoke Kumar (2002). Bengali Muslim literati and the development of Muslim community in Bengal. Indian Institute of Advanced Study. ISBN 9788179860120.
- Lahiri, Pradip Kumar (1991). Bengali Muslim thought, 1818–1947: its liberal and rational trends. K.P. Bagchi & Co. ISBN 978-81-7074-067-4.
- Shah, Mohammad (1996). In search of an identity: Bengali Muslims, 1880–1940. K.P. Bagchi & Co. ISBN 978-81-7074-184-8.
