= Domachha =

Bengali and Chittagonian fish curry

Domasa
- Type: Curry
- Course: Main
- Place of origin: Bangladesh
- Region or state: Chittagong Division
- Serving temperature: Hot
- Main ingredients: Shutki and fresh fish

Domasa/Domachha (Bengali: দোমাছা) is a popular Bengali curry made with a combination of fresh fish and dried fish. It is very popular in the districts of Chittagong, Noakhali and Feni. This dish is cooked with various seasonal vegetables including potatoes, beans, tomatoes etc.

== Ingredients ==
Dried fish, any type of fresh fish, turmeric, red chilli paste, seasonal vegetables, green chillies, oil, onion paste, ginger garlic masala, cumin paste, chilli powder, salt, water and coriander leaves.

== See also ==
- Hutki shira
- Dopiaza
- Machher jhol
- Bangladeshi cuisine
