= Pakistan Sahitya Sangsad =

Secular socialist literary society

- Formation: 1952
- Headquarters: Dhaka, Bangladesh
- Region served: Bangladesh
- Official language: Bengali

Pakistan Sahitya Sangsad was a secular socialist literary society based in East Pakistan that was closed in 1952 after martial law was declared in Pakistan.

== History ==
Pakistan Sahitya Sangsad (Pakistan Literary Association) was founded in 1952. Its first President was Qazi Motahar Hossain and its first secretary was Faiz Ahmed. The association held bimonthly meetings at the headquarters of Saogat newspaper. The association held special conferences on South Asian authors. In 1958, it held a literary conference in South Asia. The conference was an affirmation of Bengali authors and writers commitment to preserve Bengali culture and literature. It was closed in 1958 following the promulgation of martial law by the Government of Pakistan. Some of the members joined the Pakistan Writers' Organisation.
