= Rangapur Sahitya Parisad =

- Formation: 1905
- Headquarters: Dhaka, Bangladesh
- Region served: Bangladesh
- Official language: Bengali

Rangapur Sahitya Parisad was a Bengali literary society founded in the early 20th century.

== History ==
Rangapur Sahitya Parisad was founded in April 1905 in Rangpur district. It was founded by Zaminders Mrityunjoy Raichoudhury and Surendra Chandra Raichoudhury. They were members of the Vangiya Sahitya Parishad. Its members included Maharaja Manindra Chandra Nandy, Maharaja Rajendra Narayan, Maharaja Jitendra Narayan, Maharaja Jagadindra Nath Roy, and Prince Sarat Kumar Rai. The first President was Raja Mahima Ranjan Raichoudhury. The first secretary was Surendra Chandra Raichoudhury who was succeeded by his son, Soumendra Kumar Raichoudhury. The society published a quarterly journal called the Rabgapur Sahitya Parisad Patrika, the first issue came out in October 1906. The society has a museum that contains rare artifacts from Bengal, Assam, and Tibet. The association was closed in 1950 when the Zamindari system was abolished by the government of Pakistan. The copies of the journal were destroyed in 1971 in the Bangladesh Liberation war.

=== Uttar Banga Sahitya Sammilani ===
The Uttar Banga Sahitya Sammilani was a regional branch of Rangapur Sahitya Parisad based in North Bengal and Assam. The first President of the society was Justice Ashutosh Chowdhury. The organisation stopped functioning in 1913.
