= Roshkodom =

Sweet curd balls from the Indian subcontinent

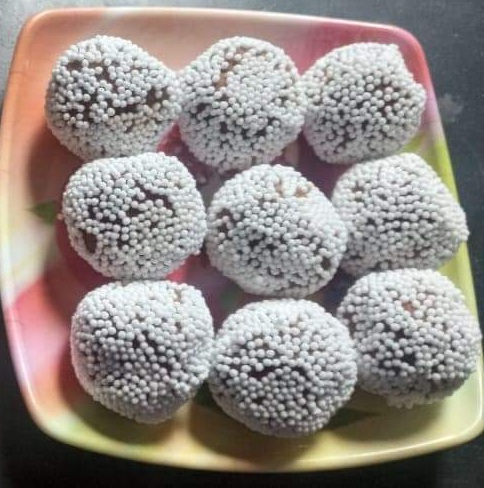
Roshkodom

Roshkodom (Bengali: রসকদম) or raskadam is a sweet from the Indian subcontinent. A specialty of Rajshahi, Bangladesh, roshkodom are essentially curd balls coated with large white beads of sugar.
