= Hutki shira =

Fermented fish curry

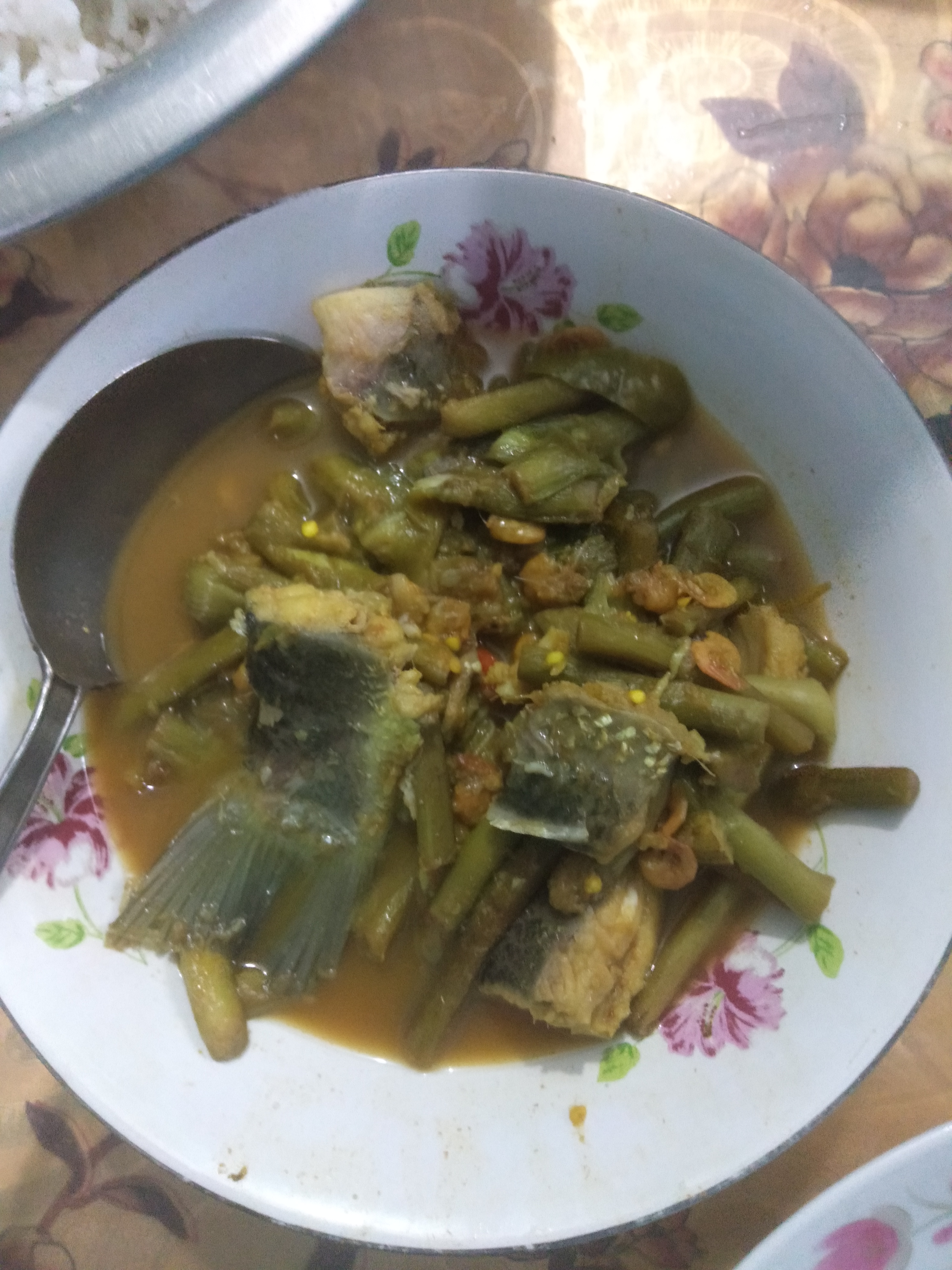
- Lotar hutki shira
- Alternative names: Hutki shira, Hukoin Shira, Fukoin Shira, futki shira, Bengali: শুটকি শিরা
- Type: Curry
- Course: Main course
- Place of origin: Bangladesh
- Region or state: Sylhet
- Main ingredients: Hidoil Hutki, garlic, turmeric red chili and any seasonal vegetables

Hutki shira (Sylheti: ꠢꠥꠐꠇꠤ ꠡꠤꠞꠣ) is a fermented fish curry made with seasonal vegetables, leafy greens, and fish or prawns. It is cooked without oil or fat. The dish is popularly eaten in Bangladesh, particularly in the Sylhet Division and neighbouring Indian regions. It has many variations.

== Etymology ==
Hutki shira means fermented fish broth in Sylheti. Alternative terms also include Hukoin shira, Fukoin shira and Futki shira.

== Variations ==
Hutki shira varies with the availability of seasonal vegetables such as gourd leaves, radishes, and eddoe.

The hidol fish hidoil mas or hidol mas is used traditionally, but lotia fish may be substituted if hidol is unavailable.

A regional variation is the Sylheti recipe mukir hutki shira, which uses eddoe or commonly knows as hairy potato (known in Sylheti as muki).

== Preparation ==
Hutki shirá is typically made with hidol hutki, crushed garlic, pureed onion, potatoes, spinach, aubergine, red pepper, chili powder, salt, turmeric, and other seasonal vegetables that are available. The fermented fish is first soaked in cold water, then placed in a large sauce pan or cooking pot with sliced onions, garlic, ground spices, salt, and shrimp. The mixture is then covered and left to cook over a high flame. Next, it is stirred as it continues to cook before pumpkin and aubergine are added. Sufficient water is added to form a broth. In the final step, Naga chili is added and the broth is given a gentle stir. The dish is often eaten over cooked rice.
