= Bhuna =

Meat curry

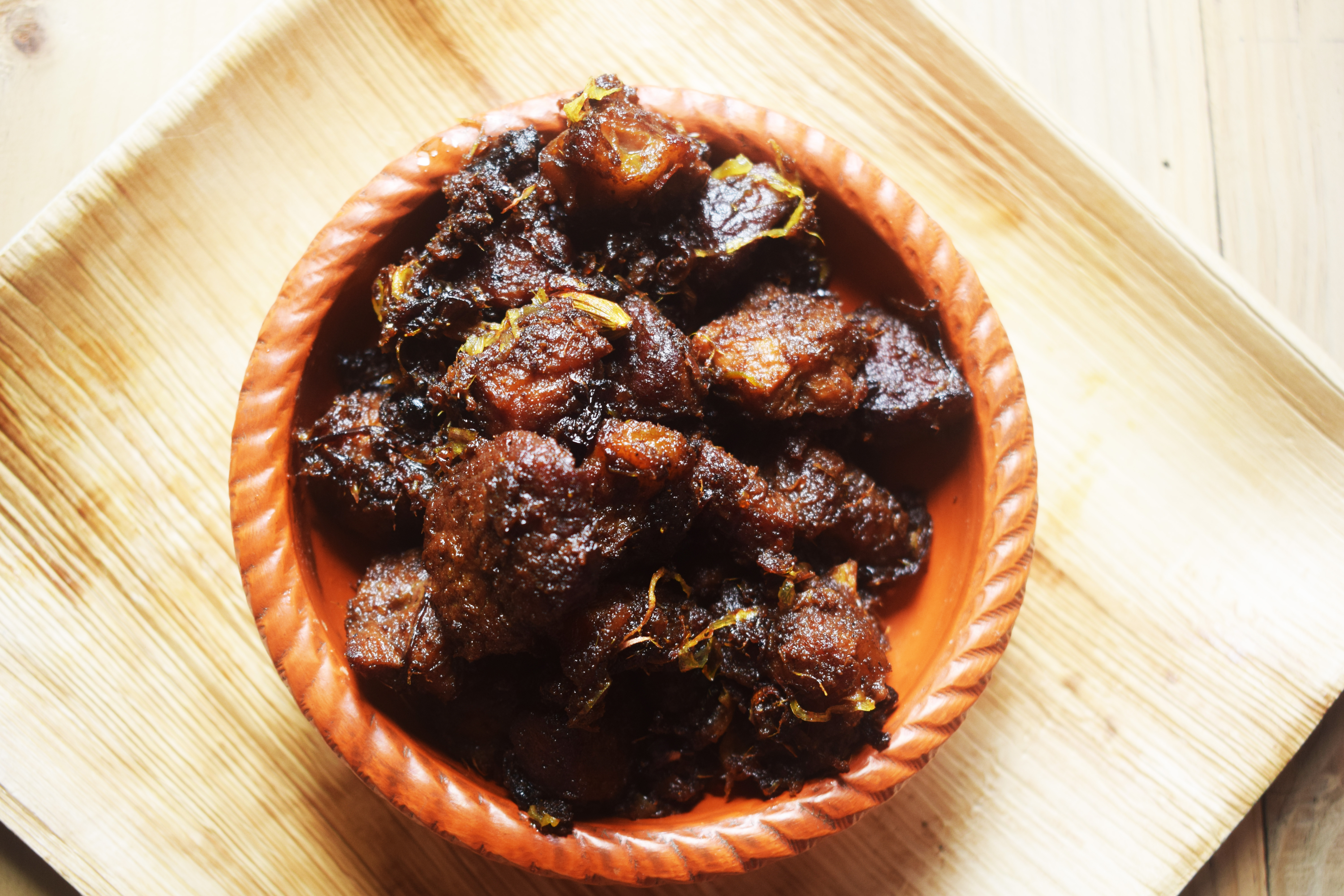
- Beef Kala bhuna
- Type: Curry
- Course: Main course
- Region or state: Bengal
- Associated cuisine: Pakistani, Bangladesh; India
- Serving temperature: Hot
- Main ingredients: Beef or mutton, Bangladeshi spices

Bhuna (Bengali: ভুনা, Hindi: भुना), also written Bhoona, is a slow-roasted, dry style of curry, often made with meat, and originating from Bengal. It is characterised by the initial frying of an onion-based paste, followed by long braising of the spices and meat, giving it a dark appearance and rich flavour.

The bhuna gosht technique is widespread in Pakistani cuisine. In Bangladesh, several varieties exist; kala bhuna is often eaten at mezban feasts, at Muslim weddings, and on holidays. Bhuna has become a commonly eaten curry in British Indian restaurants.

== Cooking technique ==
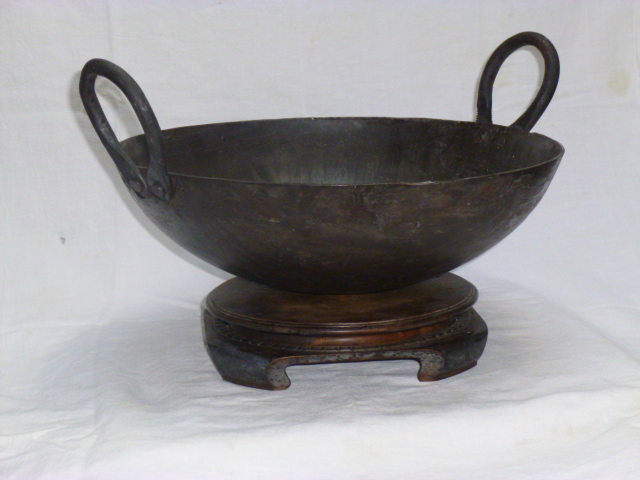
Bhuna is traditionally cooked in a heavy round pan, a karahi.

The bhuna curry technique, originally from Bengal, calls for a paste made from onions, garlic, and ginger to create a thick sauce. Tomato can be included in the paste, which is fried in oil until soft. The pieces of meat or vegetables for the curry are then added and braised in a deep, heavy, round pan called a karahi. Cooking continues at length, reducing and thickening the sauce to develop a rich flavour. Bhuna is thus a characteristically dry style of curry.

The spices in the sauce vary somewhat but can include chili, cumin, coriander, cardamom, cinnamon, cloves, turmeric, black pepper, salt, mustard oil, garam masala, nutmeg, and toasted cumin.

== Indian subcontinent ==
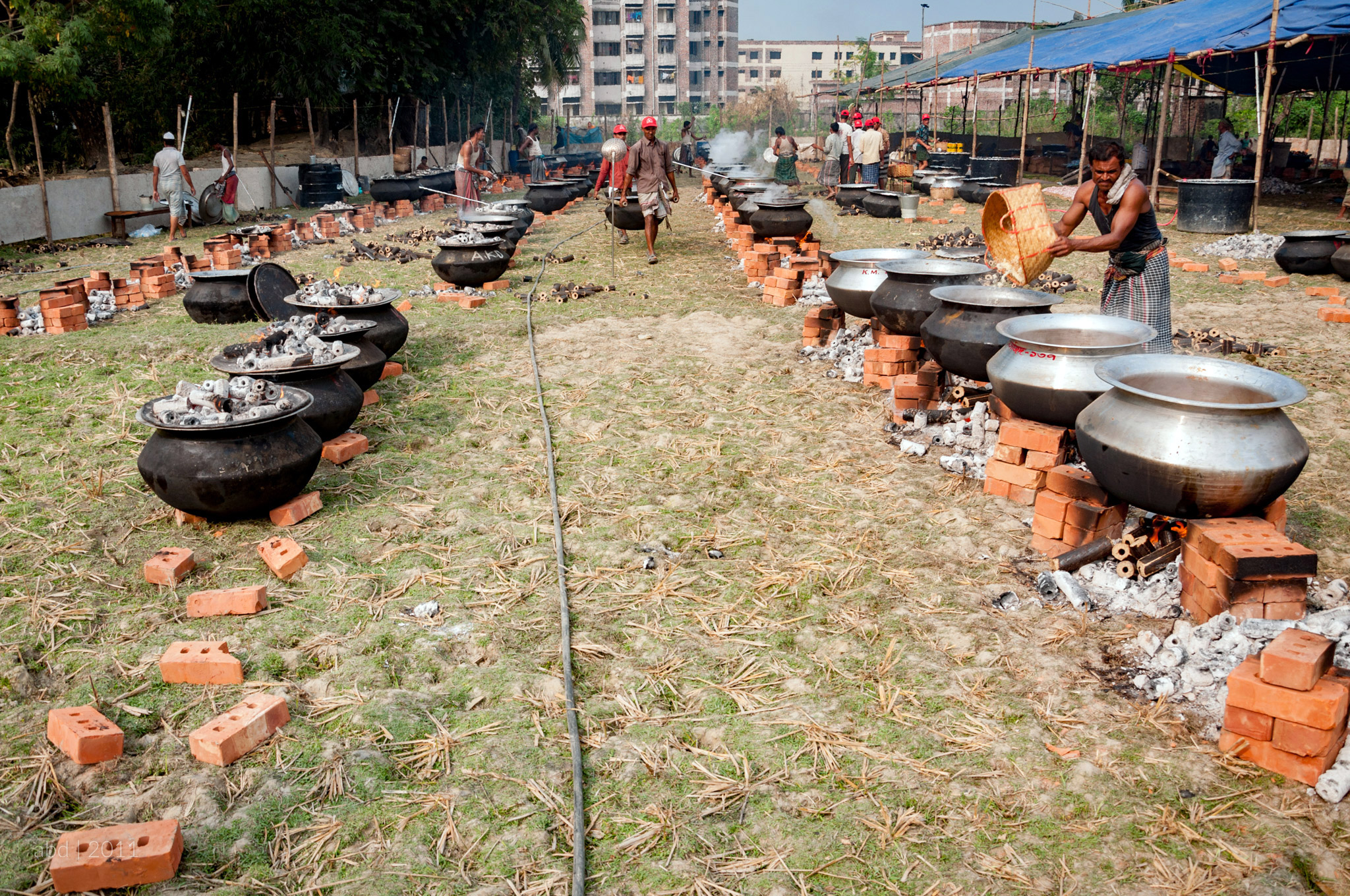
Cooking kala bhuna for the Mezban festival, Chittagong, Bangladesh

The bhuna technique is widespread in Indian cuisine, though it is not used in Assam. For example, bhuna slow roasting is used in the kaliya meat curry made by the Kayastha community. The curry is served with steamed rice or naan flatbread.

In Bangladeshi cuisine, bhuna is a meat curry made of beef or mutton. One variety, the Chittagong-style kala bhuna ("black bhuna"), gets its name from its appearance, as the meat goes blackish during the long process of deep frying with the spices. Bhuna is common across Bangladesh, including in Sylhet, Khulna, and Dhaka. This dish is often eaten at mezban feasts, at the Muslim holiday of Eid, at Bengali Muslim weddings, and in sehri or iftar during the time of Ramadan. In Old Dhaka, restaurant dishes in the 1960s included Nehari Bhuna (spicy goat or beef shank soup) and Magaj Bhuna (spicy sauteed goat brain). A characteristic Dhaka curry, bhuna khichdi, is made with lentils and rice.

== In Britain ==
Bhuna is one of the styles of curry commonly served in Indian restaurants in Britain, alongside popular dishes like chicken tikka masala, Madras curry, and korma. Until the early 1970s, most of these restaurants were owned and run by migrants from Sylhet in East Pakistan, which became Bangladesh in 1971. Bhuna has been described as "a curry-house favourite". According to the British Curry Guide, the high heat of frying produces a "deep, caramelized flavor". BBC Food presents a variant recipe using chicken rather than red meat. A vegetarian bhuna can be made using South Asian paneer cheese. The British television chef Nadiya Hussain proposes a crab bhuna, and a quick lamb bhuna with the sauce ingredients and oil ground to a fine paste.

In Glasgow, Scotland, a "Full Bhoona" originally meant a lamb bhuna with a large side salad at the Koh-i-Noor restaurant, opened in 1964. It became a stock phrase meaning "giving [something] every effort".
