= Pandal =

Fabricated structure in South Asia

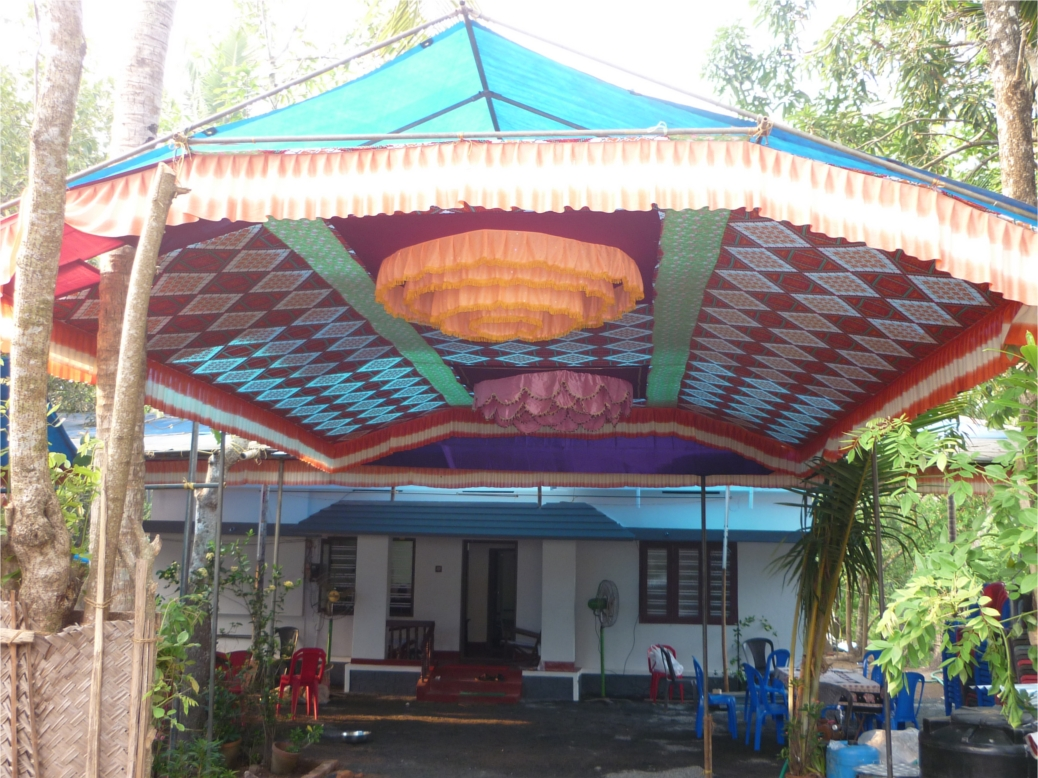
A pandal erected in Kerala

A pandal is a temporary fabricated structure or canopy used across South Asia, particularly in India and neighbouring countries, to host religious, cultural, and social gatherings. Set up in open public spaces, along roadways, or adjacent to residences, pandals are commonly erected for events such as festivals, weddings, fairs, and exhibitions. They may also serve as decorative ceremonial gates constructed to welcome visitors.

== Etymology ==
According to the Oxford English Dictionary, pandal is derived from the Tamil word pantal.

== Significance ==
=== Hinduism ===
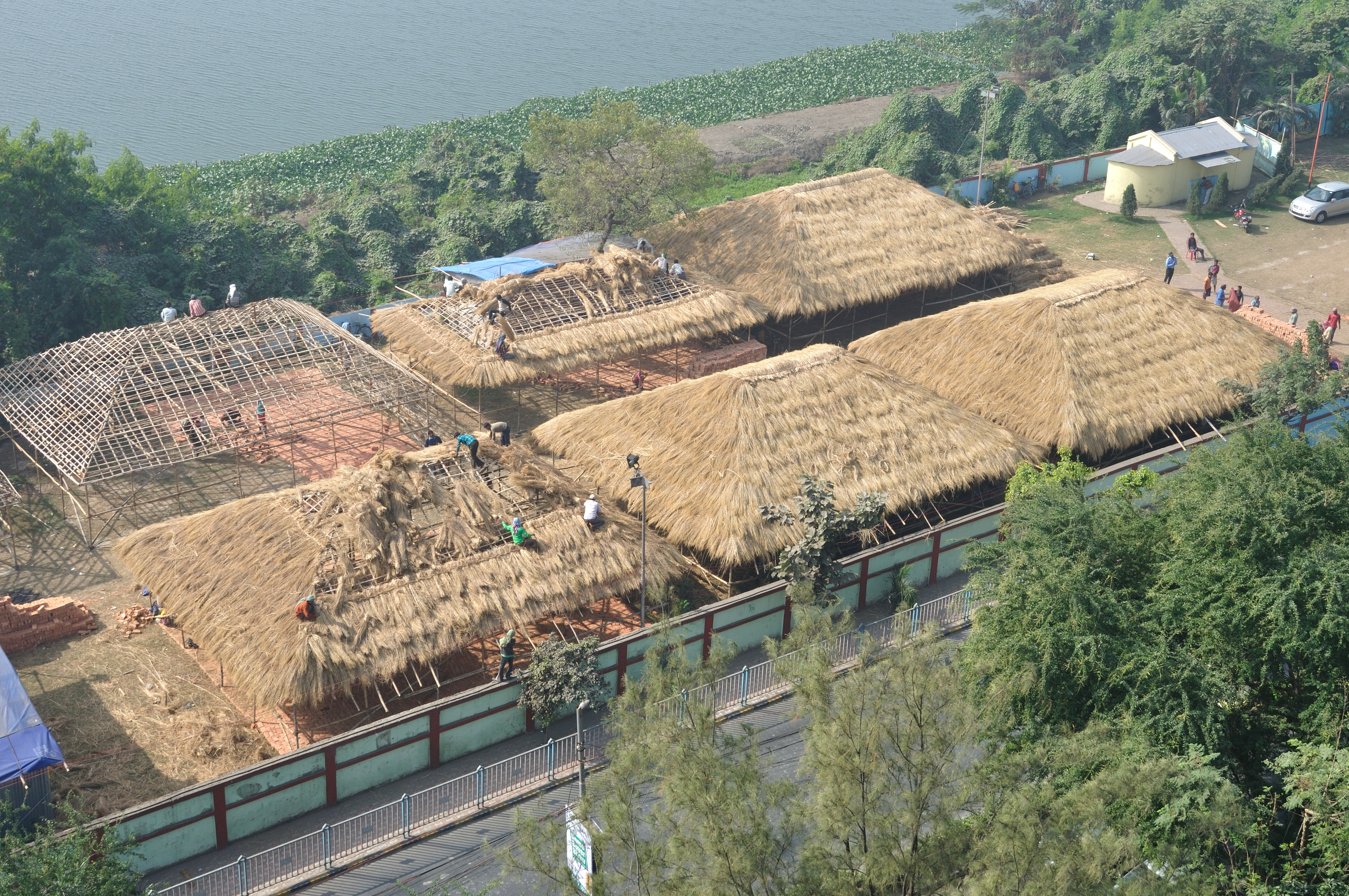
Temporary pandals being thatched in Kolkata

In Hinduism, pandals are set up to venerate deities during festivals such as Ganesha during Ganesh Chaturthi, Krishna during Krishna Janmasthami or Durga during Durga Puja, known as puja pandal.

Pandals may be modelled after the structure of temples, huts, or skyscrapers.

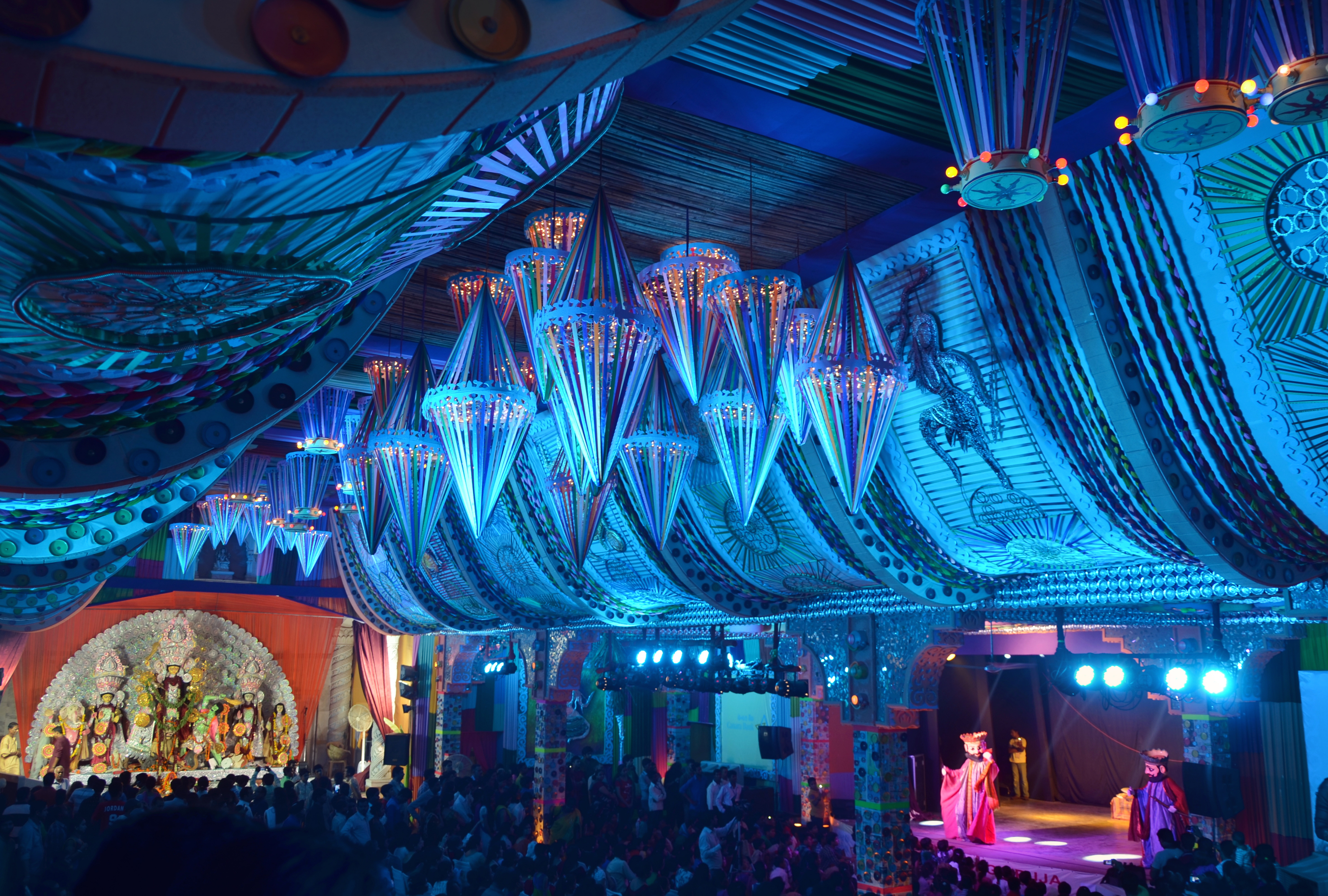
Durga Puja pandal with theatre performances, Matri Mandir, Safdarjung Enclave, Delhi, 2014

=== Buddhism ===
In a ritual unique to Sri Lanka, Vesak pandals are set up during the Vesak festival, with illuminated panels illustrated with episodes from the life of the Gautama Buddha and Jathaka Katha or stories based on Buddhist culture.

The fundamental concept of a Vesak pandal is a creatively made, massive structure, decorated with a large number of lights and paintings mounted on a huge supporting structure. This supporting structure is traditionally built with Puwak Gasa (Areca nut trees).

Pandals are also set up during Gammaduwa (village rebirth) festivals, honouring the goddess Pattini.

Pandal also refers to a platform from which people splash water during the new year celebrations of the Thingyan festival.

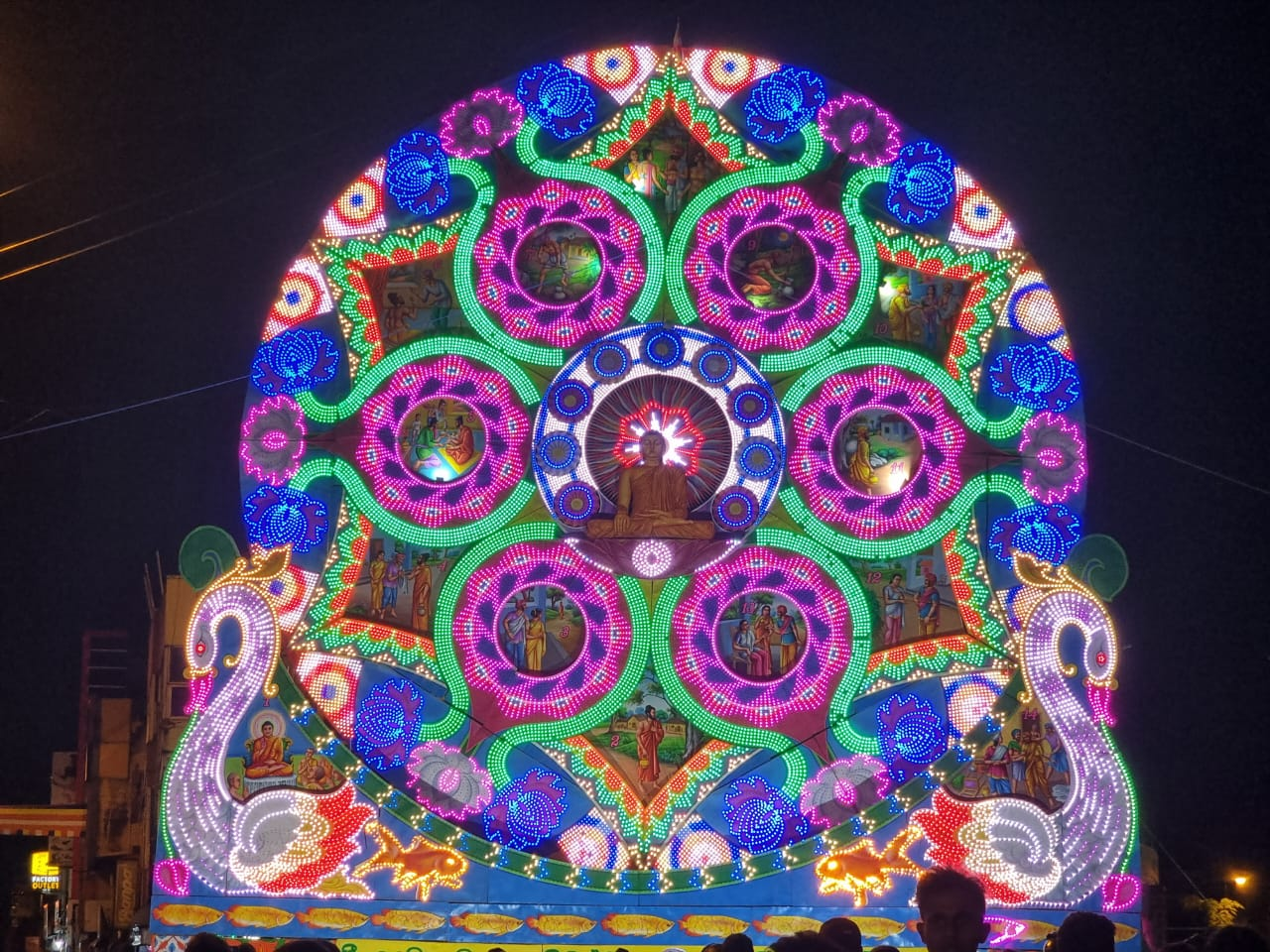
Vesak Thorana (Pandol) in Colombo, Sri Lanka

=== Islam ===
In Bangladesh, pandals, traditionally known as shamiana, are used in open field, outside mosques or Eidgahs for Eid prayer, mehfils for religious and cultural occasions such as Milad, Mezban, and weddings. Each year the national Eidgah's entrance is decorated in a new theme.
