= Bengali cuisine =

Culinary tradition

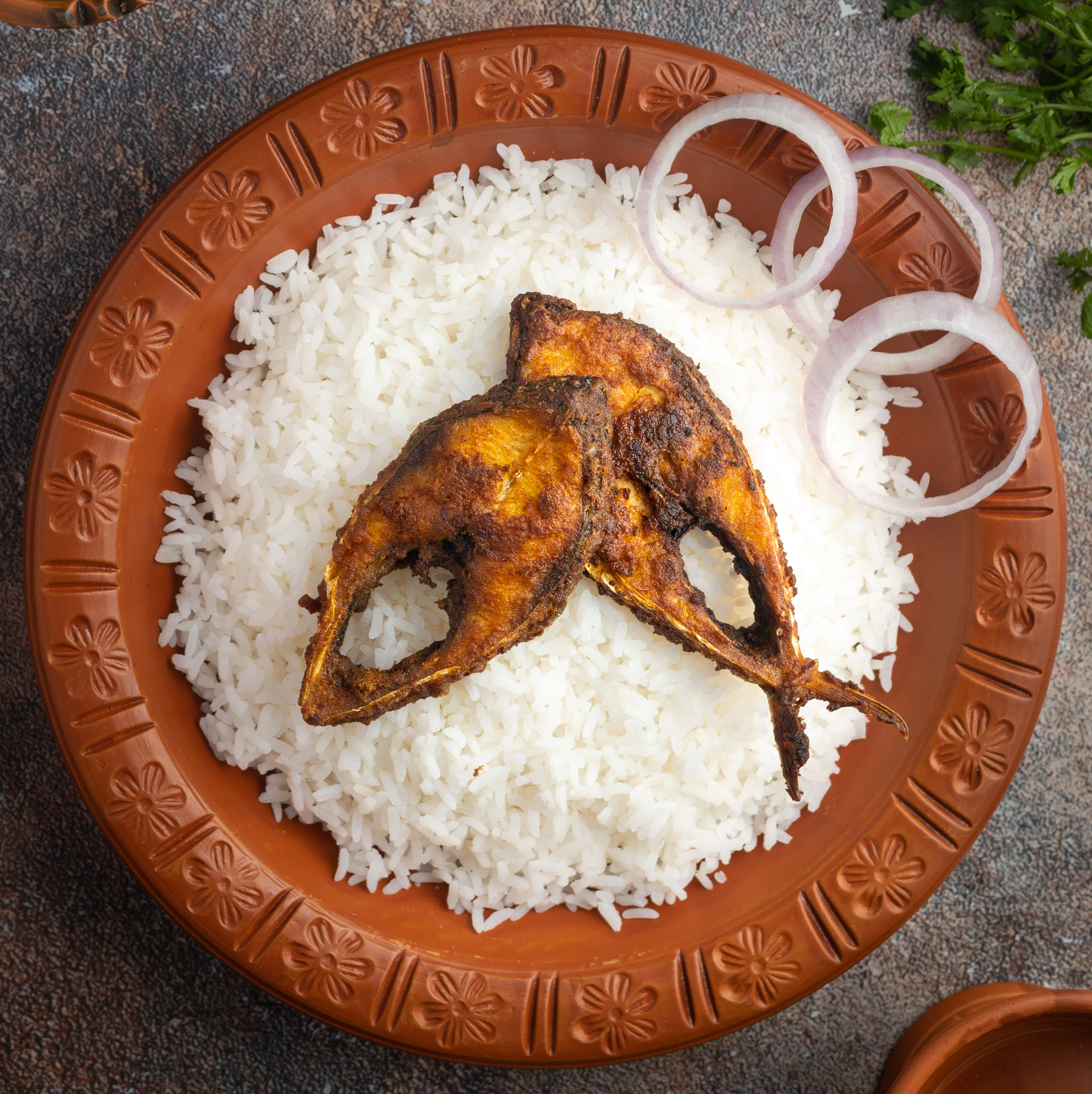
Fried hilsa fish served over rice

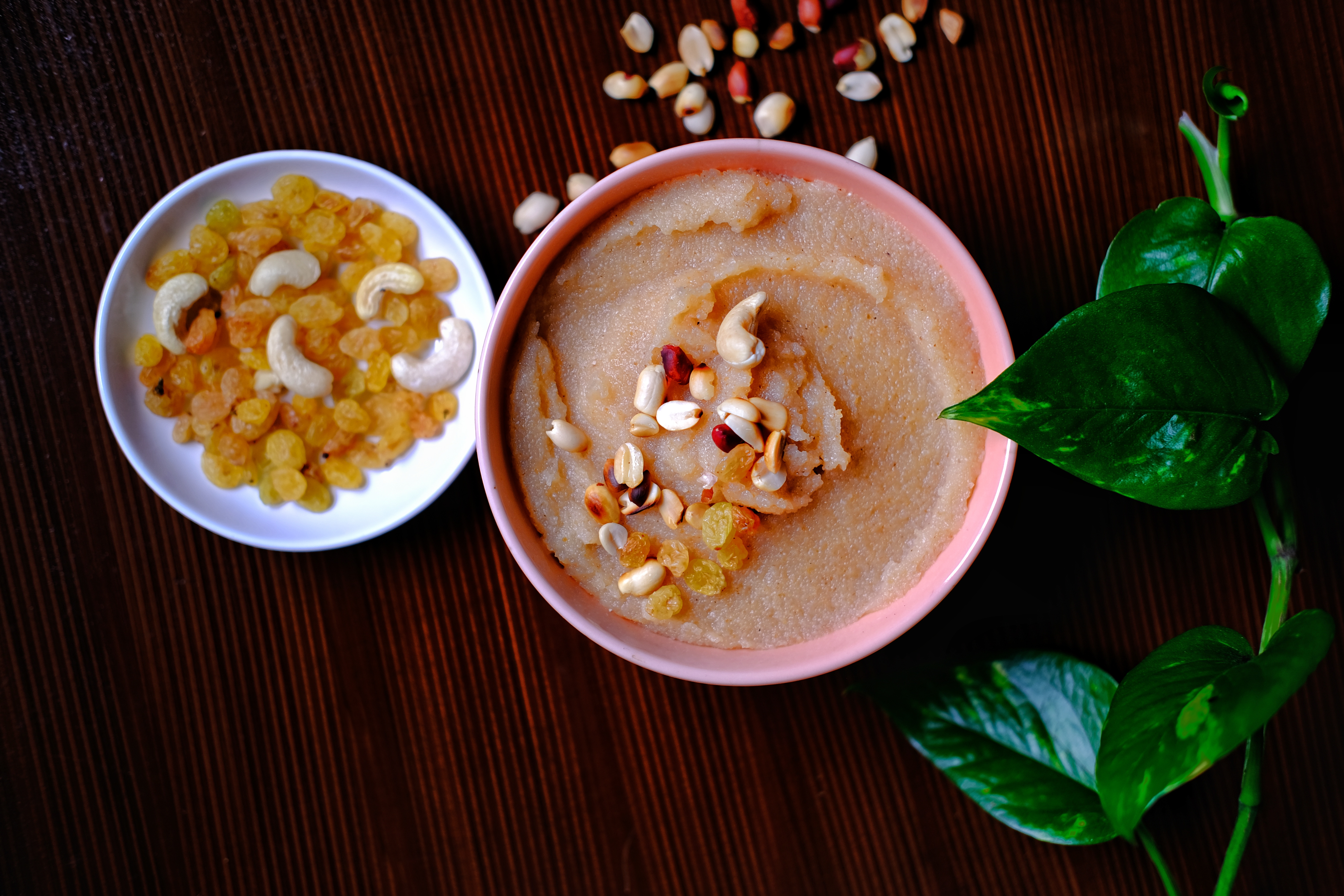
Halva served with raisins and nuts

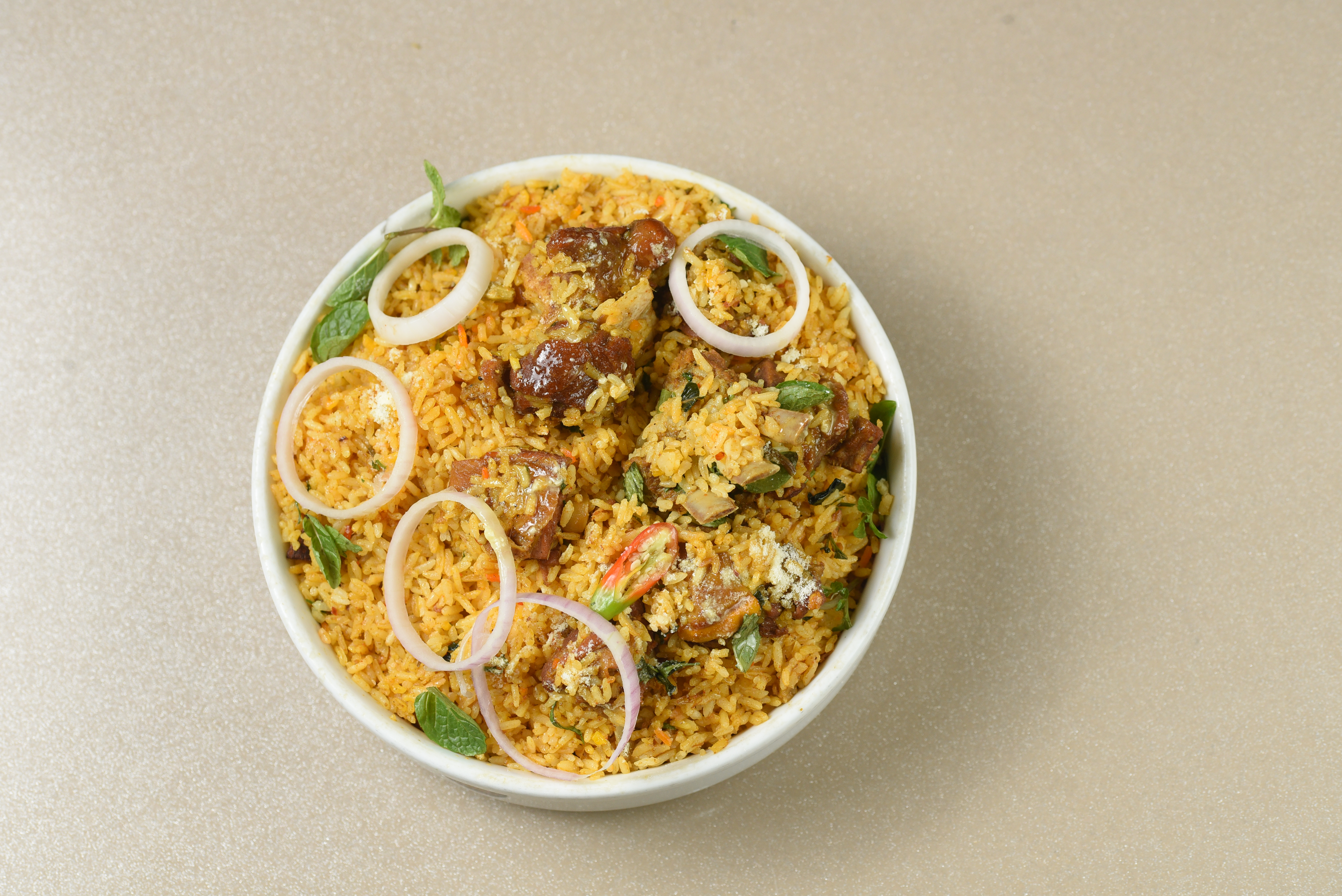
A bowl of mutton biryani

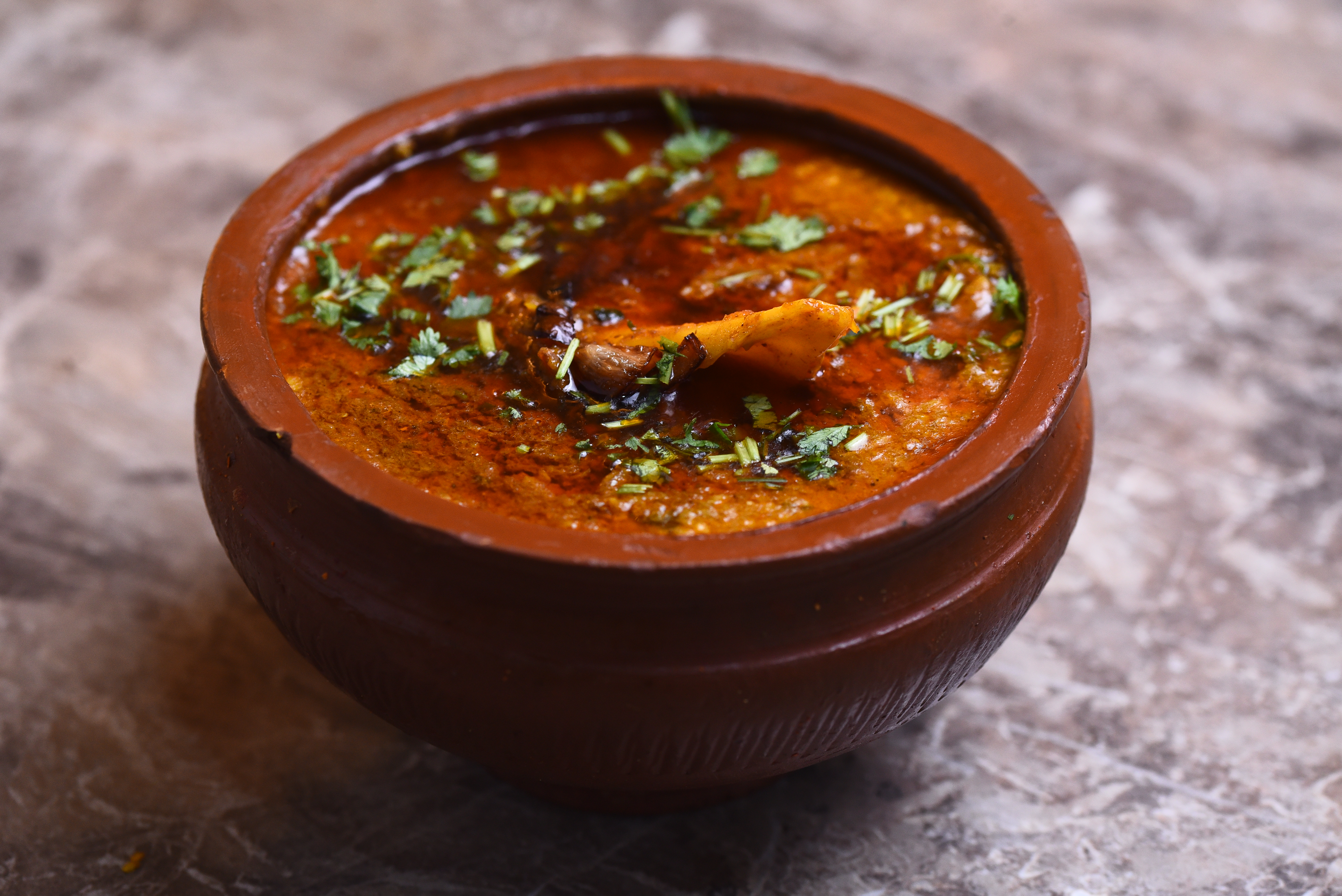
Haleem, a stew

Bengali cuisine is the culinary style of Bengal, comprising now most of Bangladesh, Indian states of West Bengal, eastern part of Jharkhand known as Manbhum and a region of Assam known as Barak valley. The cuisine has been shaped by the region's diverse history and climate. It is known for its varied use of flavours including mustard oil, as well as the spread of its confectioneries and desserts. There is a strong emphasis on rice as a staple, with fish traditionally the most common protein. Freshwater fish are preferred to marine fish, although barramundi, known as bhetki, is also common. Meat is also a common protein among Bengalis, with chicken and mutton being the most popular. Beef is popular within the Muslim community. However, meat from any source is consumed far less than fish in Bangladesh. In more recent times, lentils have begun to form a significant part of the diet. Many Bengali food traditions draw from religious and social functions, such as adda, Poila Boishakh, Eid, and Durga Puja.

== Culinary influences ==
=== Mughal influence ===
Muslims conquered Bengal around the mid-thirteenth century, bringing with them Persian and Arabic cuisine. Such dishes as korma and bhuna had once been meals of the higher courts, but the cooks of the Mughals brought their recipes to the lower and middle classes. The influence was reinforced during the rule of the British Raj, where Kolkata became the place of refuge for many prominent exiled Nawabs, notably the family of Tipu Sultan from Mysore and Wajid Ali Shah, the ousted Nawab of Awadh. The exiles brought with them hundreds of cooks and masalchis (spice mixers), and as their royal patronage and wealth diminished, they became interspersed into the local population. These cooks came with the knowledge of a very wide range of spices (most notably jafran and mace), the extensive use of ghee, and marinating meat with yoghurt and chilli.

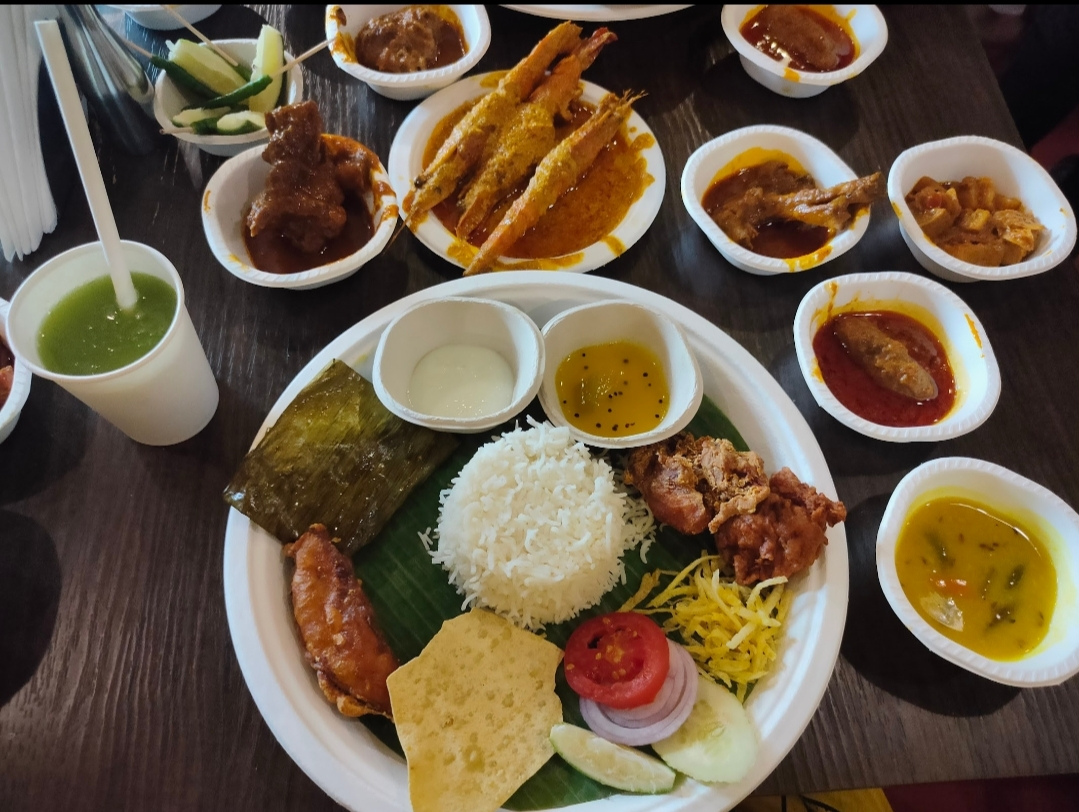
A traditional Bengali lunch

In Bangladesh, this food has become common fare for the population, while in West Bengal, it has remained a staple food of both common people and professional chefs, who have further innovated dishes such as chap (ribs slow-cooked on a tawa), rezala (meat in a thin yogurt and cardamom gravy), and the kathi roll (kebabs wrapped in flatbread).

The Mughals had a particular fixation on meat, bringing mutton and beef into mainstream Bengali cuisine as well as already known kinds of meat like chicken and venison.

Furthermore, traditional desserts had been primarily based on rice pastes and jaggery, but under Mughal influence moved towards significantly increased use of milk, cream, and sugar along with expensive spices such as cardamom and saffron.

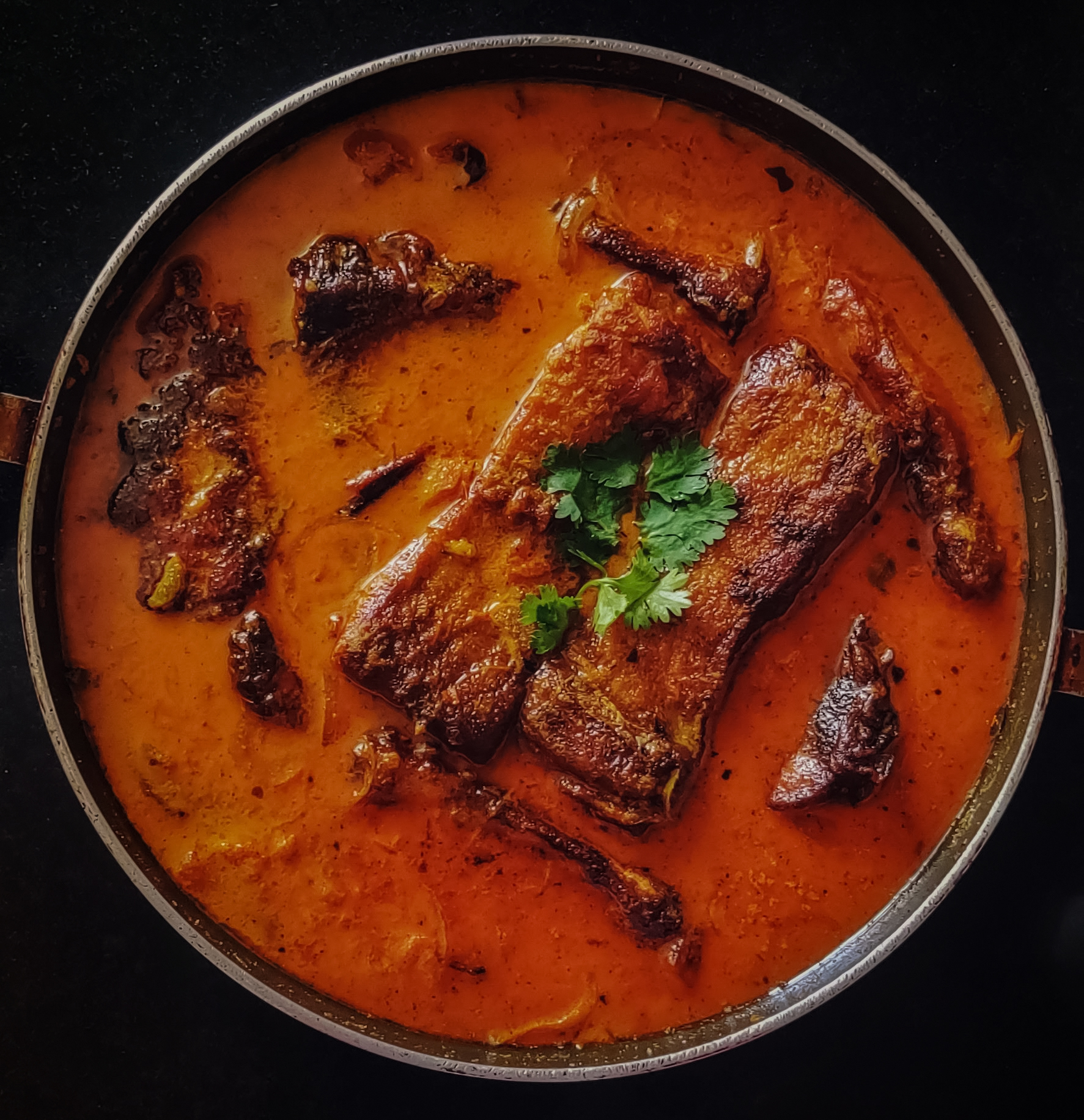
Catla kalia

=== Influence of Bengali Hindu widows ===
In Bengali Hindu tradition, widows were not allowed to eat foods that would not be classified as "bitter", necessitating experiment and innovation. While most Bengali castes ate meat and fish, this was barred for widows. Widows also could not use "heating" foods such as shallot and garlic, but ginger was allowed. This style found a core place in Bengali curries in general, both vegetarian and non-vegetarian. Expensive spices such as saffron, cinnamon, or cloves were used very sparingly—if at all. Nuts, dry fruits, milk, and milk products (such as cream, ghee, or curd) were similarly scarce. These economic and social restrictions influenced Bengali widows to create a brand new set of meals that utilised only vegetables and cheap spices.

=== Partition of Bengal ===
The large-scale displacement along religious lines as a result of the partition led to changes in meal-taking to adhere to religious restrictions. In Bangladesh (the former East Bengal and East Pakistan), Mughlai food is common, and includes foods that are less popular in West Bengal, such as beef kebab. Additionally, sweets such as zarda and firni-payesh are eaten. In rural Bangladesh, many people eat makna fried, popped, or raw.

During the colonial period, many Western food shops were established in Kolkata, making puff pastries, channa, chocolate, and chips especially popular. Dishes such as chop, gravy cutlet, sponge rasogolla, and ledikeni. As a result of a multi-cultural community, Kolkata city's cuisine continuously changes, and takes heavy influence from Chinese and European palates.

== Characteristics ==
Bengali cuisine can be subdivided into four different types of dishes: eatables (খাদ্য, ভক্ষ্য, or ভোজ্য); চর্ব্য, chôrbyô, or chewables, such as rice or fish; চোষ্য, choshyô, or suckables, such as ambal and tak; লেহ্য, lehyô, or lickables, like chutney; and পেয়, peyô, or drinkables, which includes drinks, mainly milk.

== Regional specialties ==
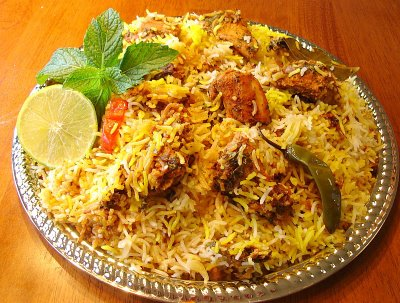
Bangladeshi biriyani

Different parts of Bengal are famed for certain dishes, food items, and ingredients. For example, South Bengali districts around the Sundarbans boast of the expensive chui jhal chilli, which they peel and chop into small pieces to be cooked in their dishes and give off a strong aroma. On the other hand, North Bengal is the home of many Bengali desserts, such as the Mishti doi of Bogra, the Kachagolla of Natore, and the Chomchom of Porabari. However, other regions also have famous desserts like the Balish Mishti (pillow-sweet) of Netrokona, the Monda of Muktagachha, the Red Yoghurt of Nabadwip, and the famed Roshmolai of Comilla.

=== Kolkata ===
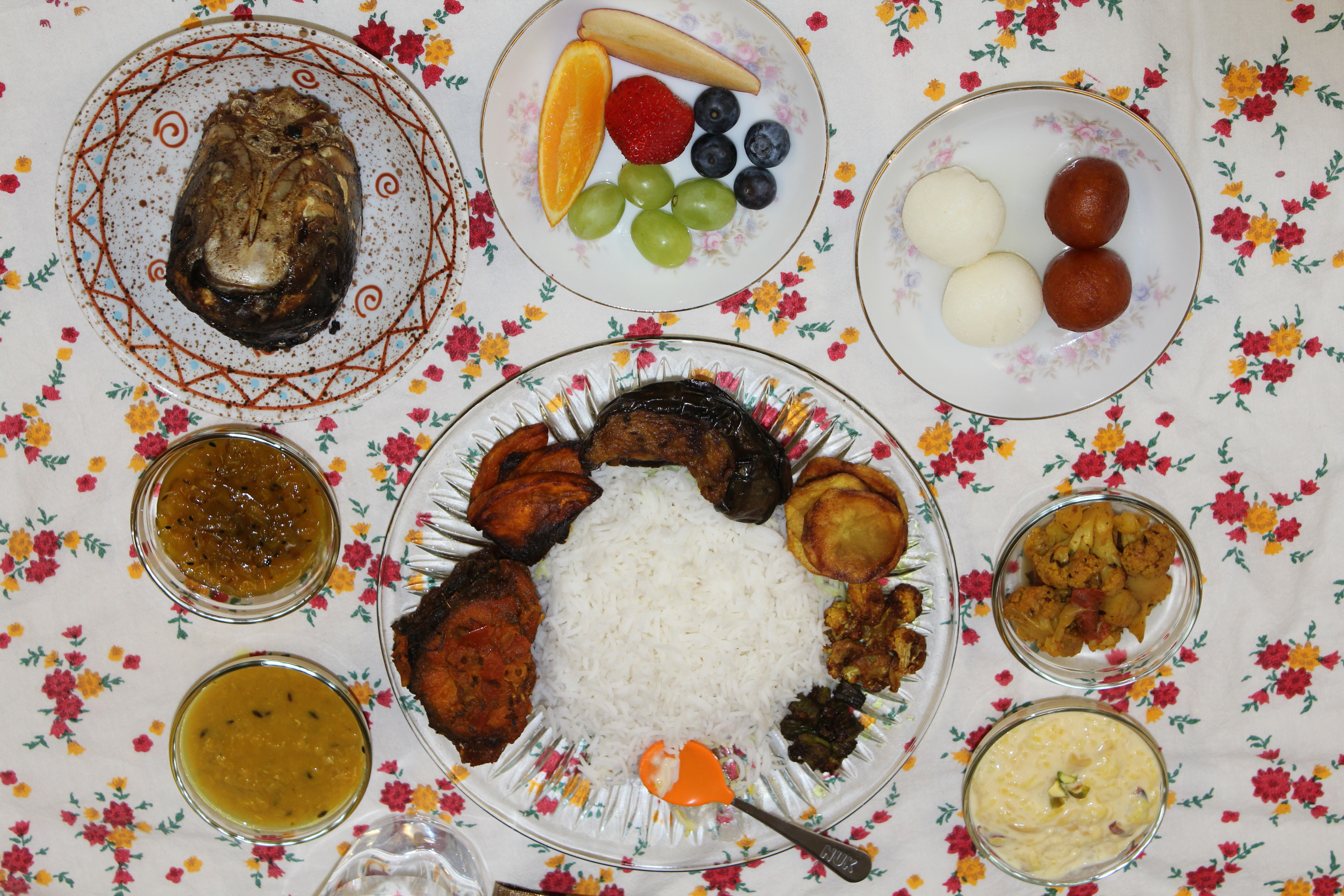
The First rice Grain in Mouth Ceremony

In Kolkata, many local street vendors own small shops from which they sell their own homemade goods. Items like cheeses (paneer) can be eaten as is, or can be made into sweet sandesh, rosomalai, rosogolla, or chanar payesh. Milk is especially used in Kolkata's various types of payesh, differing in the use of different grains and additives like dates, figs, and berries. In addition to European foodstuffs like chocolate, Kolkata takes culinary influence from its Chinese diaspora, most prominently seen in Indian Chinese cuisine. Phuchka, known in the rest of India as panipuri, is a common kind of Bengali street food made with a fried dough casing and a potato and chickpea filling, usually found in small stalls alongside bhelpuri, masala chai, ghugni, and chaat stalls.

==== Influences ====
During the 19th century, many Odia cooks migrated to Bengal to work in the households of affluent Kolkata families. They were also hired to cook for weddings and other family ceremonies. The introduction of Odia cooks into their kitchens brought in subtle but significant changes to Kolkata's cuisine. Some of Kolkata's classic dishes were originally from Odisha but were refined in Kolkata kitchens by Odia cooks. In fact, some researchers say that dishes like kanika (Bengali mishti pulao) were first introduced to Kolkata kitchens by Odia cooks, although this is contested by other researchers. Even to this date, most of the cooks in Kolkata kitchens and hotels are Odia cooks.

The Chinese of Kolkata originally settled into a village called Achipur south of Kolkata in the late 18th century, later moving into the city and finally into its present home in Tangra at the eastern edge of Kolkata. The Chinese-origin people of Kolkata form a substantial and successful community with a distinct identity. With this identity came Chinese food, available at almost every street corner in Kolkata at present, due to the taste, quick cooking procedure, and no similarity with the original Chinese recipe other than the use of soy sauce. They were mostly Cantonese tradesmen and sailors who first settled down here and decided to cook with whatever items they had at hand.

Calcuttan immigrants to other countries have started carrying this abroad as well; Indian Chinese restaurants have appeared in many places in the United States and UK.

Indian Chinese food has been given a second boost in popularity since the 1950s, when many Tibetans migrated into Indian territory, following the 14th Dalai Lama's flight. Tibetans brought their own taste preferences to add to the genre, such as the popular momo (a kind of dumpling) or thukpa (a hearty noodle soup). Tibetans and Nepali immigrants found ready employment in the many kitchens that can now be found on virtually every street in Kolkata.

=== Chittagong ===
Chittagonian Bengali culinary tradition is mostly known for Mezban and mixed rice dishes like kala bhuna, which has shoulder pieces of beef and traditional spices. Dried fish (shutki) is more available in the Chittagong region than in other parts of Bengal.

==== Mezban ====
Mezban (locally known as Mejjan) is the Bengali word for special occasion feasts in the Chittagong region of Bangladesh. Historically, Mezbani is a traditional regional feast where people are invited to enjoy a meal with white rice and beef, besides other dishes rich in animal fat and dairy. It is held on occasions such as death anniversaries, birth anniversaries, celebrating successes, launching a new business, entry into a new house, the birth of a child, marriage, aqiqah and circumcision, ear piercing of girls, and naming of the newborn. The invitation to the Mezban ceremony generally remains open for all, and various people to different places and neighbourhoods convey the invitation for the feast. In urban areas, attending a mezban is by invitation only. Usually, the consumption of food at Mezbani takes place from morning to afternoon.

Beef-based dishes are preferred by Bengali Muslims and are a symbol of social prestige for a Mezban feast. The rich and the poor arrange feasts on various occasions as much as circumstances allow them. It has a distinct style of cooking, and proper Mezban meat demands a certain skill; for example: the unique beef curry served in this feast is known as Mezbani gosht, which carries a distinctive recipe, knowledge of which is essentially confined within the Chittagonian cooks.

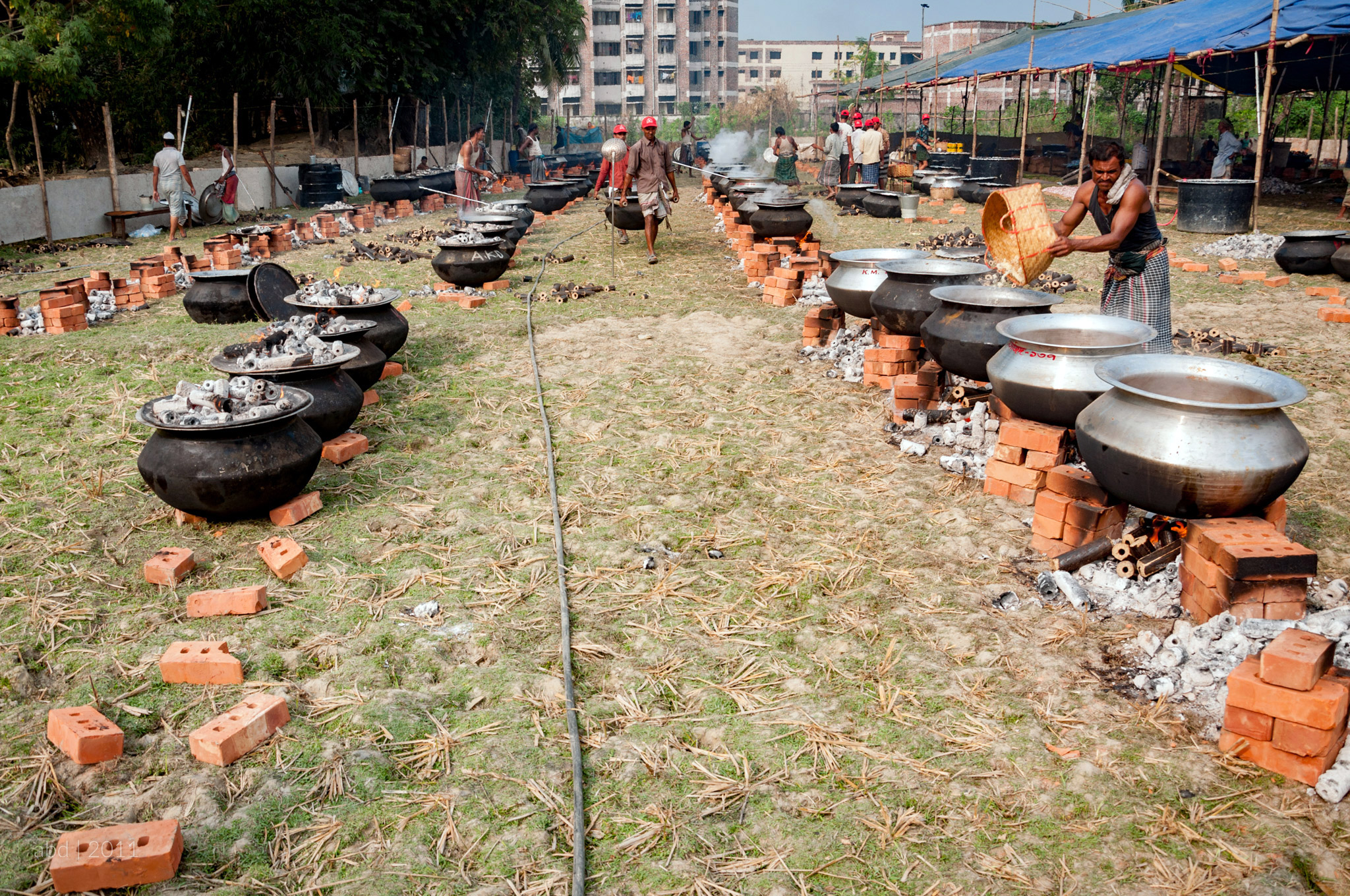
Mezban cooking in Chittagong, Bangladesh.

Fish is used instead of beef while cooking Mezban in Hindu tradition. The Hindu community of Chittagong organises Mezbani each year under the banner of "Chittagong Parishad", with curries made from fish, vegetables, and dried fish.

=== Dhaka ===
Dhakaiya food is one of the most notable regional Bengali cuisines. The rich culinary customs are influenced by Mughlai, Central Asian, Armenian, Hindustani, and native Bengali cuisines. However, it also has dishes unique to Dhaka. The Nawabs of Dhaka had brought Mughlai cuisine to Bengal, which was wholly retained by Dhaka's culinary community. Due to the high costs of producing Mughlai food, the recipes were limited to the elite classes in colonial India, and slowly expanded as Bangladesh's economy grew. The main focus on lamb, mutton, beef, yoghurt, and mild spices defines the taste of the style. Such dishes as kebab; stuffed breads; kacchi biriyani; roast lamb, duck, and chicken; patisapta; Kashmiri tea; and korma are still served at special occasions like Eid and weddings. Due to the high class of the food, using an excess amount of expensive ingredients like ghee, and making the food melt in one's mouth were essential to the feel of the food.

Old Dhaka boasts a variation of the famous pilaf - the Morog Polao - in which the rice is cooked after and the chicken pieces are cut. Other polaos include ilish polao and rui polao. Dhakaiyas are noted for introducing paneer and boiled eggs to khichuri. Dhakai bakarkhani is a thick, biscuit-like flat-bread that is a traditional street-food snack, famed for its quality and taste. It is mainly dished up with tea. Dhakaiyas proudly hold a heritage of creating the best khili paan using various herbs and spices. They also offer a khili paan for diabetic patients called the "paan afsana". Haji biryani is a dish, invented by a restaurateur in 1939, made with highly seasoned rice, goat's meat, and a number of spices and nuts. The restaurant has become an integral part of Dhakaiya culture.

==== Adda ====
Adda (Bengali: আড্ডা) is a traditional Bengali means of socialising over food during the workday. Food taken during adda consists usually of mishti or sweetmeats, tea, and coffee, although heartier meats such as fried fish may be brought out as well.

The adda saw a rise during the colonial era among the Bhadralok guild members to meet and talk about a range of topics:

You could be discussing Charles and Camilla's marriage this moment, and the next moment you're swinging over to the latest cricket series between India and Pakistan, and then swing back to the recent controversy over Tagore.

Being a hobby for artisans, women were largely secluded from adda, a sentiment that has begun to disappear with the democratisation of adda and women occupying a larger space in social life. For this reason, adda was seen as a refuge "...from the home, a neutral rendezvous away from both the perceived drudgery of the workplace and domesticity".

In the post-colonial era, the adda has been fading due to the more rigid structure of work and exploitative perceptions of unnecessary laziness. This has inspired a sizeable movement of Bengalis who believe it integral to the idea of lyadh, or doing nothing to relax and recharge. However, adda does still exist, being attended during vacation time or after work at clubs or coffee shops. The tradition even has an equivalent to the Greek symposium, as students may meet for a study session over food or have a teacher teach in a more relaxed environment.

=== Sylhet ===
Sylhet boasts a variation of the famous pilaf dish – Akhni polao – in which the rice is cooked after and the chicken pieces are cut. Commonly consumed varieties of meat include beef, chicken, mutton and duck/goose in dishes such as Hash O Bash. They also proudly hold the heritage of Beef Hatkora, a rice dish consisting of a wild citrus fruit not found in other parts of Bengal.

During the British period, biscuits and loaves were introduced in Sylhet and received popularity within the Muslim community. The middle-class Hindus of Cachar and Sylhet, however, were very suspicious of biscuits and breads, as they believed they were baked by Muslims. On one occasion, a few Hindus in Cachar caught some Englishman eating biscuits with tea, which caused an uproar. The information reached the Hindus of Sylhet, and a little rebellion occurred. In response to this, companies started to advertise their bread as "machine-made" and "untouched by (Muslim) hand" to tell Hindus that the breads were "safe for consumption". This incident is mentioned in Bipin Chandra Pal's autobiography, and he mentions how gradually culinary habits of Hindus eventually changed.

== Utensils ==
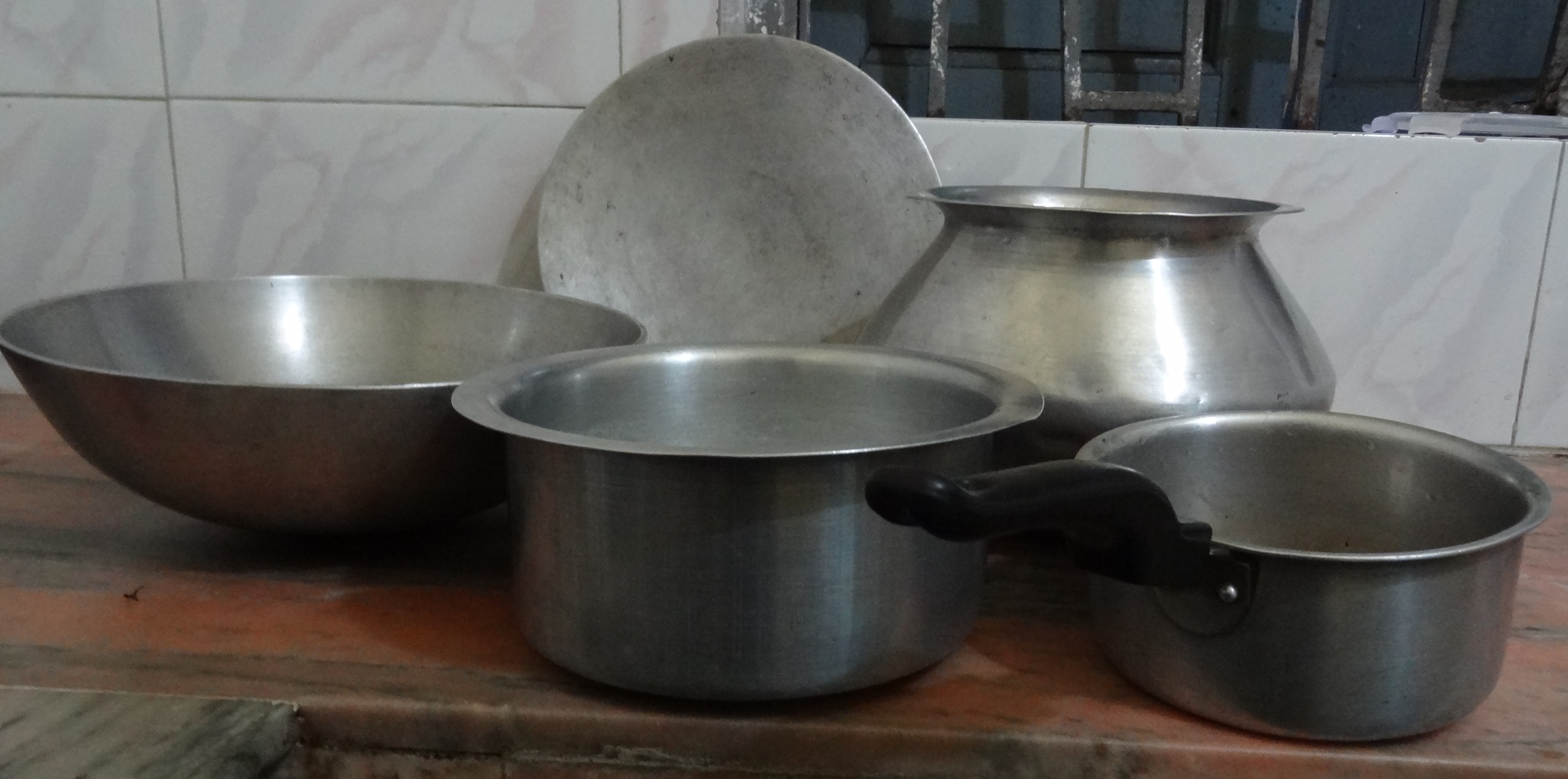
Different utensils used in a Bengali household.

Bengali food is often served on plates that have a distinct flowery pattern, often in blue or pink. Another characteristic of Bengali food is the use of the boti (also called dao or da). It is a long, curved blade on a platform held down by one or both feet; both hands are used to hold whatever is being cut and move it against the blade, which faces the user. This method gives effective control over the cutting process, and can be used to cut anything from prawns to large pumpkins.

A korai is a cooking vessel for most Bengali sauces and stir-fries. The dekchi (a flat-bottomed pan) is used generally for larger amounts of cooking or for making rice. It comes with a thin, flat lid, which is used also to strain out the starch while finishing up cooking rice. The tawa is used to make roti and paratha. The other prominent cooking utensil is a hari, which is a round-bottomed pot-like vessel. The three mentioned vessels all come in various sizes and in various metals and alloys.

The kuruni is used only to grate coconuts.

=== Historical ===
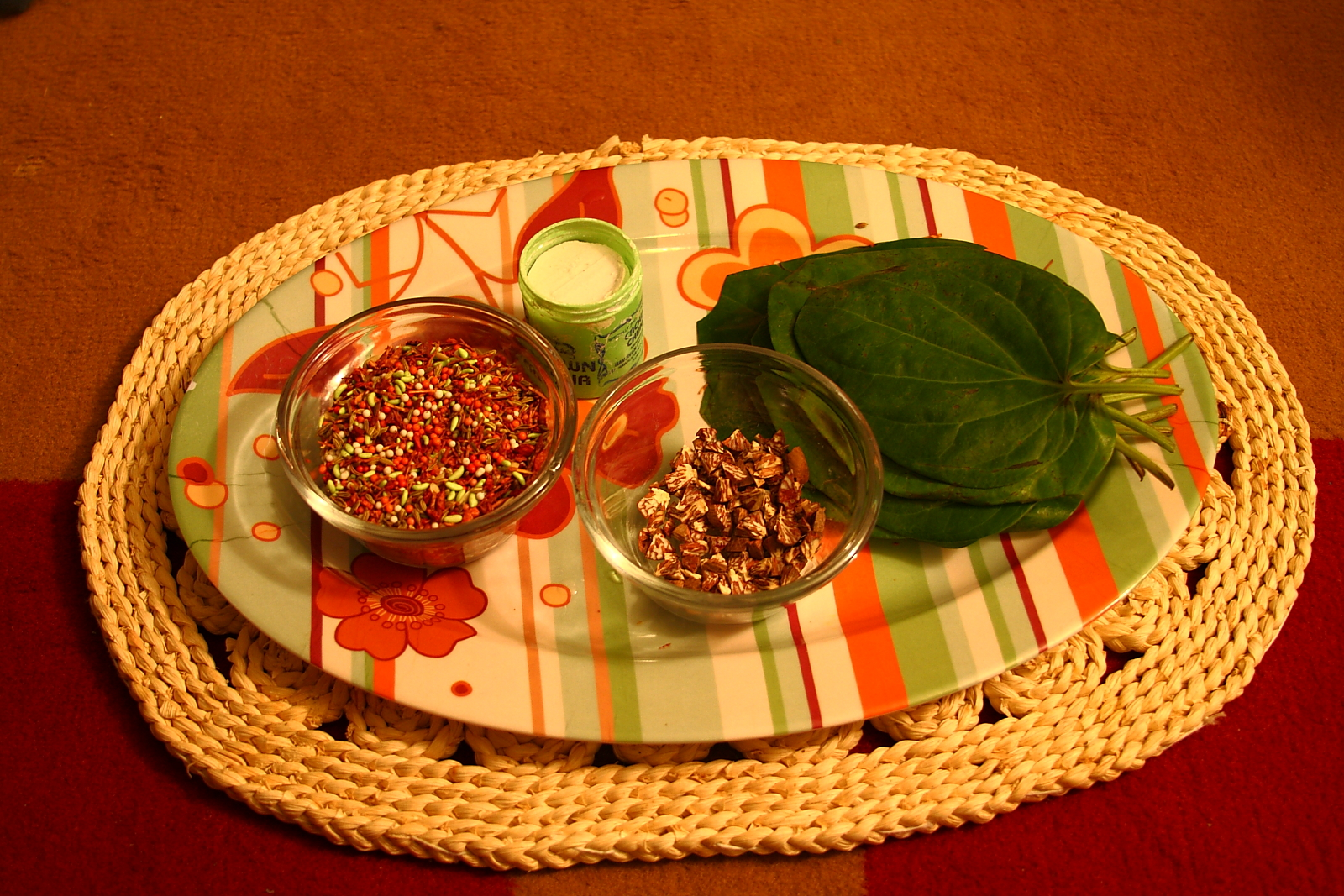
Paan and supari are typically provided after meals

Bengalis usually eat sitting on the floor with food served on a dostorkhan. They historically ate without silverware, with a large banana or plantain leaf serving as the plate, or with plates made from dried sal leaves sewn together.

It is customary to offer guests food and drink appropriate to the time of their visit. At meals, guests are served first, with the possible exception of very old or very young members of the host family. Within the family, serving starts with the senior males (those of highest social rank or eldest). School-age children are served before wives, daughters-in-law, and the cook, who are the last to eat.

=== Contemporary ===
Prior to colonisation, adherence to meal order was a marker of social status, but with British and Portuguese influence and the growth of the middle class, this has slowly disappeared. Courses are frequently skipped or combined with everyday meals. Meals were usually served course by course to the diners by the youngest housewives, but increasing influence of nuclear families and urbanisation has replaced this. It is common to place everything on platters in the centre of the table, and each diner serves themselves. Ceremonial occasions such as weddings used to have elaborate serving rituals, but professional catering and buffet-style dining are now commonplace. However, large family occasions and more lavish ceremonial feasts may still abide by these rules.

== Meals ==
Daily meals are usually simple, geared to balance nutrition and making extensive use of vegetables. The courses progress broadly from lighter to richer and heavier and go through various tastes and taste cleansers. Rice remains common throughout the meal and is the main constituent of the meal until the chaţni (chutney) course.

=== Main course ===
==== Fish ====
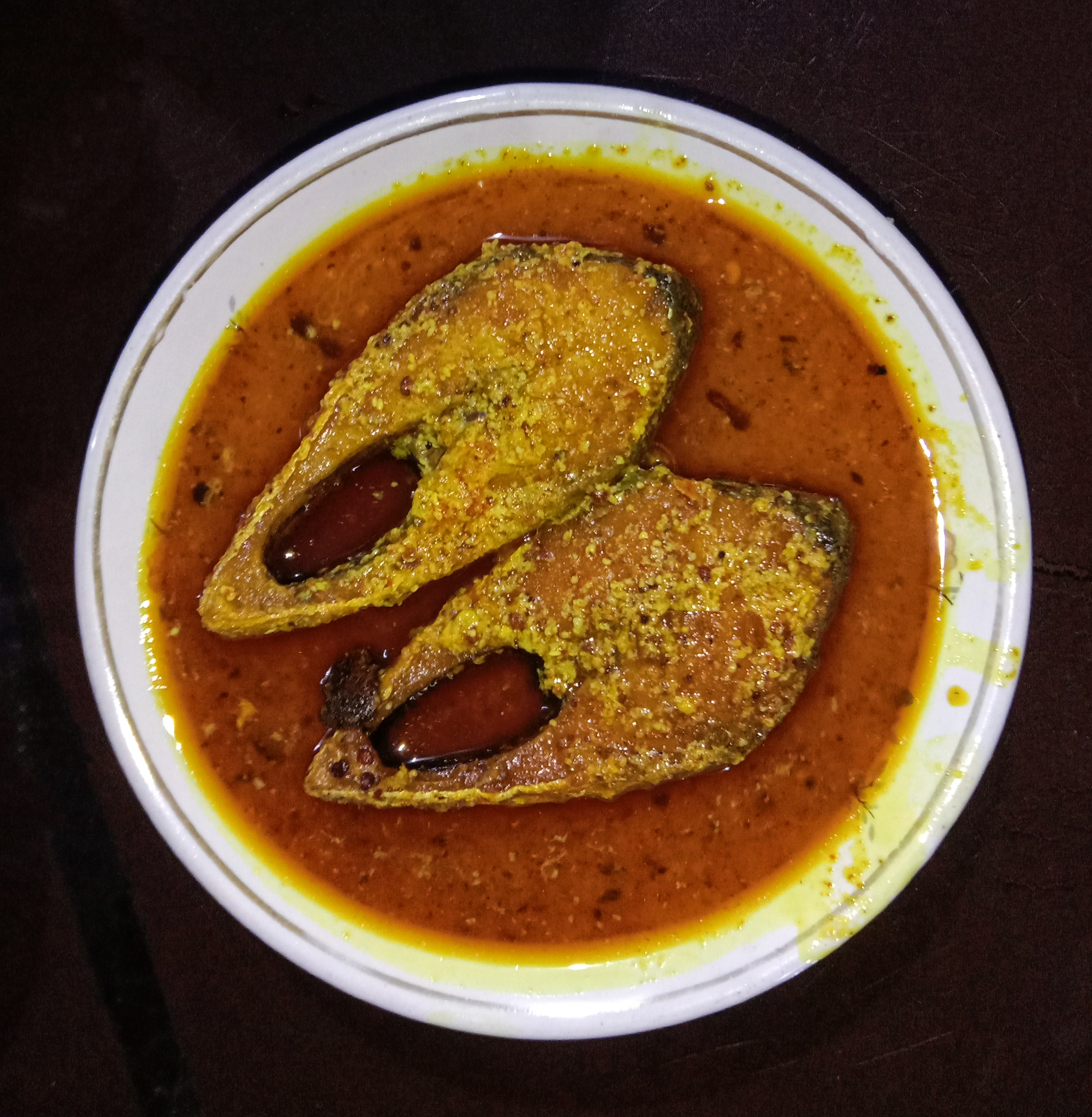
Shorshe ilish

Fish is a core part of the Bengali diet, and is generally eaten with rice as a substantial course. Bengalis typically use freshwater and brackish fish when making meals. Spices are used heavily in the preparation of fish, and the fish is usually served either as a curry or a fried steak. Popular fish curries include boal, rohu, ilish, and pabda.

One tradition includes the left side of the cidal fish being cooked in oil.

=== Sweets ===
Bengali sweets have a long history. The Portuguese friar Sebastien Manrique, travelling in the region in the 17th century, noted the multitude of milk-based foods and sweets prepared in traditional ways. Falooda, shahi jilapi and shemai are popular sweet foods and desserts.

==== Chomchom ====
Chomchom originated in Tangail District. Chamcham, an oval-shaped brownish variety of chomchom from Porabari in Tangail District of modern-day Bangladesh, dates back to the mid-19th century. The unique taste has been attributed to the water in Porabari.

==== Rosogolla ====
Rosogolla, a Bengali traditional sweet, is one of the most widely consumed sweets in India. It spread to Bengal in 1868. Chhana-based sweets were introduced in Eastern India from about the 18th century; as the process and technology involved in synthesising "Chhana" were introduced to the Indians by the Dutch in the 1790s. The cottage cheese "schmierkase" was also known as Dutch cheese. The earlier versions of Rossogolla lacked the binding capacity of the modern avatar that is well known and highly acclaimed today. This was due to the fact that the know-how involved in synthesising such a sweet was unknown before being experimentally developed by Nobin Chandra Das and then constantly improved and further standardised by his successors. Furthermore, the "chhana" manufactured in those days was a coarse and granular variety and had low binding capacity. It was made with citric and ascorbic acid from natural fruit extracts. This type of "chhana" cannot be worked on to compact into any regular and firm shape for the purpose of sweet-making, leave alone making Rossogolla. This is because of a documented technological issue – lactic acid (extracted from whey) used to curdle milk now was introduced to India in the late 18th century by Dutch and Portuguese colonists (along with acetic acid). It is this method that creates the fine, smooth modern "chhana" with high binding capacity – which is now the staple raw material for Bengali confectioners. At present, Nobin Chandra Das is referred to as having invented the spongy variant of rossogolla.

==== Rasmalai ====
Rasmalai is a popular sweet from Bengal, across South Asia. The sweet allegedly became popular when the Sen brothers opened Matri Bhandar in 1930 and shared their ancestral recipe in Tipperah district (now Comilla, Bangladesh) of the Bengal Province. Which has been granted a geographical indication (GI) in Bangladesh. Soon in the mid-20th century, Ras Malai became a regionally popular sweet across South Asia apart from Bengal.

==== Sandesh ====
Sandesh is a dessert, originating from the Bengal region in the eastern part of the Indian subcontinent, created with milk and sugar. Some recipes for sandesh call for the use of chhena or paneer (which is made by curdling the milk and separating the whey from it) instead of milk itself.

==== Darbesh ====
Laddu (or as it is known as "darbesh" in Bengal) is a very common sweet in West Bengal and Bangladesh, as well as the rest of the subcontinent, especially during celebrations and festivities. They are usually made out of flour, ghee/butter/oil and sugar. Alternative recipes can be made of coconut shavings and jaggery, raisins, chopped nuts, oatmeal, khoa, nutmeg, cardamom, or poppy seeds, among other ingredients. The sweet dates back to the year 4 BCE, where it was used for medicinal purposes and to keep the hormones of 9-11-year-old girls "in check".

==== Pantua ====
Pantua is similar to gulab jamun, and could be called a Bengali variant of that dish.

==== Mishti doi ====
Mishti doi is a fermented sweet doi (yogurt). It is made with milk and sugar or jaggery. It differs from plain yogurt because of the technique of preparation. The dish is said to have originated in the Bogra district.

==== Other sweets ====
Several varieties of doi, such as mishţi doi, fruit-floured doi like aam doi, custards, and rice pudding (khir or firni) are also popular in Bengal.

Chhanar jilapi, kalo jam, raghobshahi, pantua, Jolbhora Sandesh, roshbhora, lord chomchom, payesh, bundiya, nolen gurer shôndesh, malpua, sarbhaja, sarpuria, langcha, ledikeni, babarsa, patisapta, mihidana, sitabhog and a variety of others are examples of sweets in Bengali cuisine.

== Beverages ==
Common beverages include shorbot, lachhi, ghol, matha, falooda and Rooh Afza. The two main types of Bengali tea are dudh cha (milk tea) and masala cha. Srimangal, the tea capital of Bengal, is famed for seven-color tea, while Dhaka is famed for borhani. Traditional fruit juices (rosh) are also drunk, such as sugarcane juice, mango juice, palm fruit juice, and date juice, as well as basil seed- and tukma-based drinks.

== Gallery ==
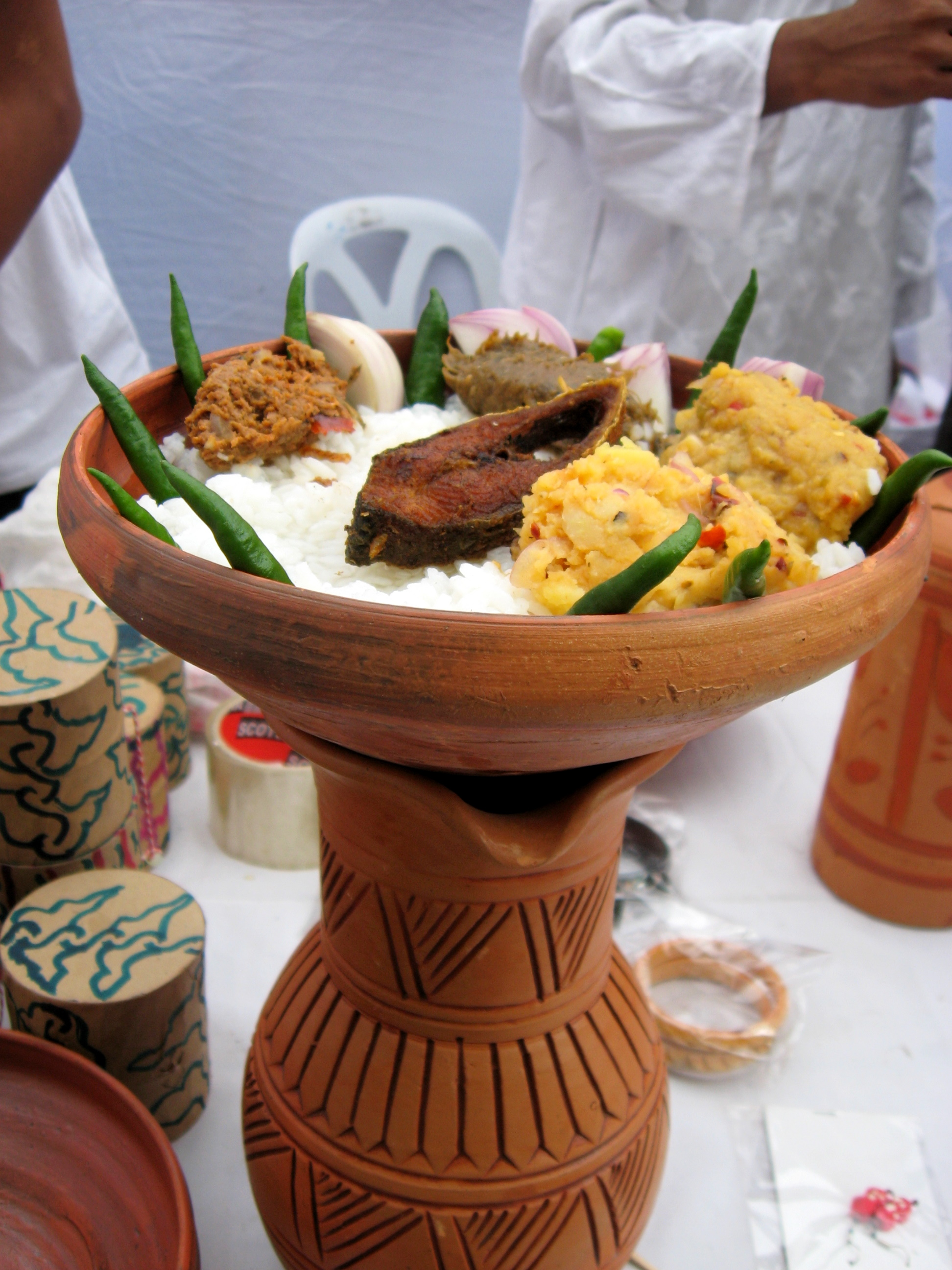
Panta bhat with ilish bhaja and bhurta, a popular Bengali New Year meal

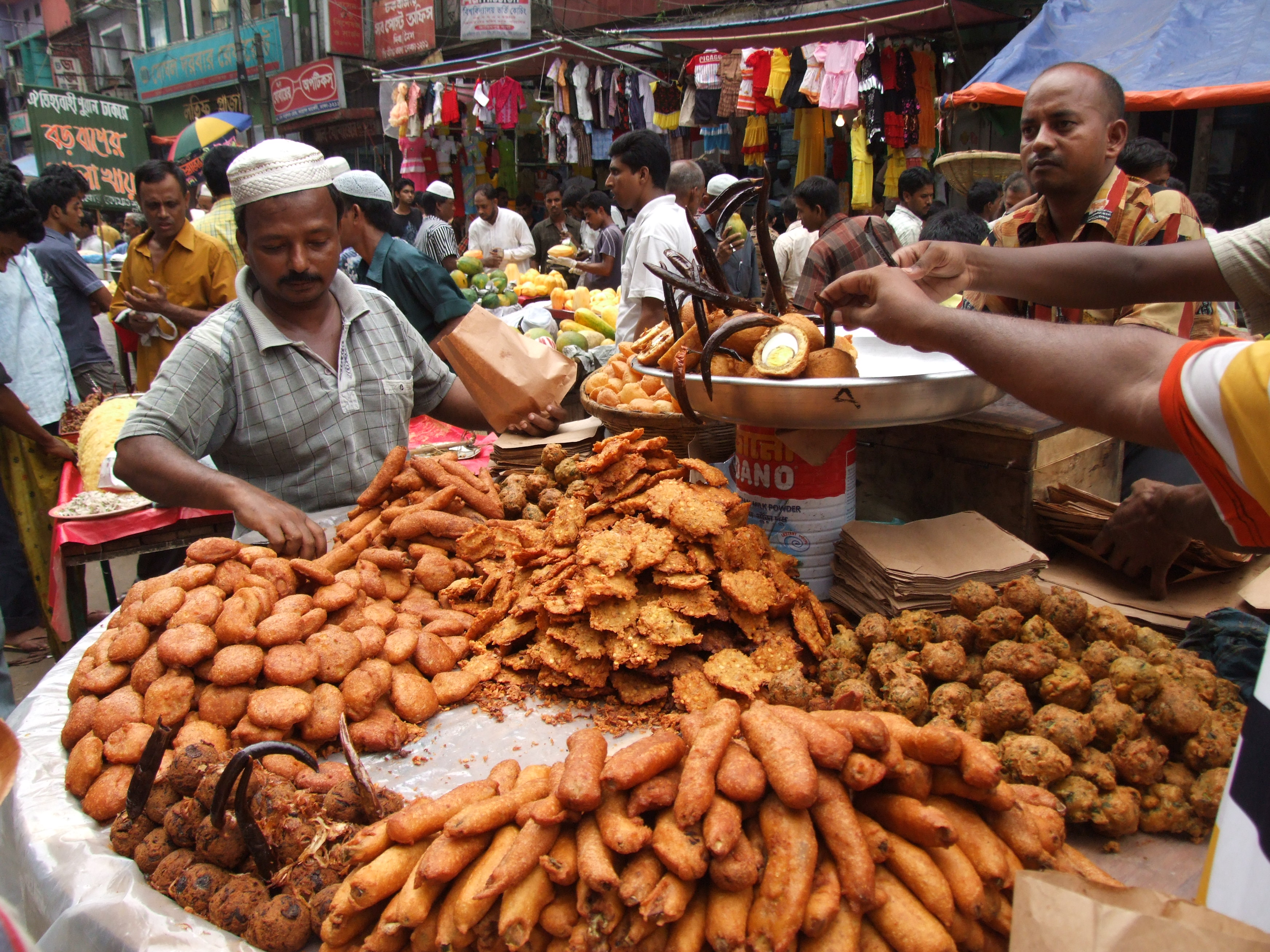
Traditional Bengali iftar bazaar

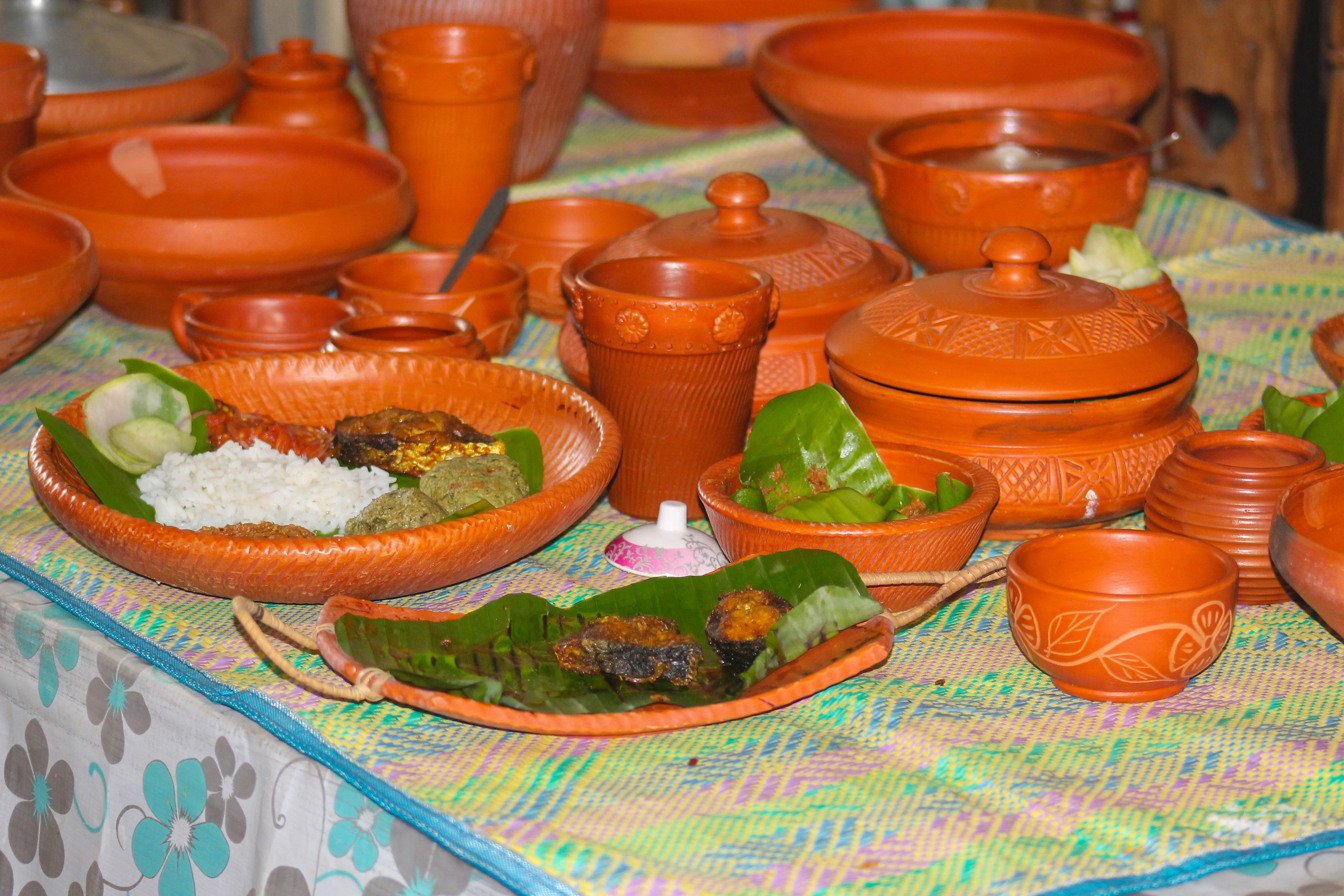
A traditional Bengali meal

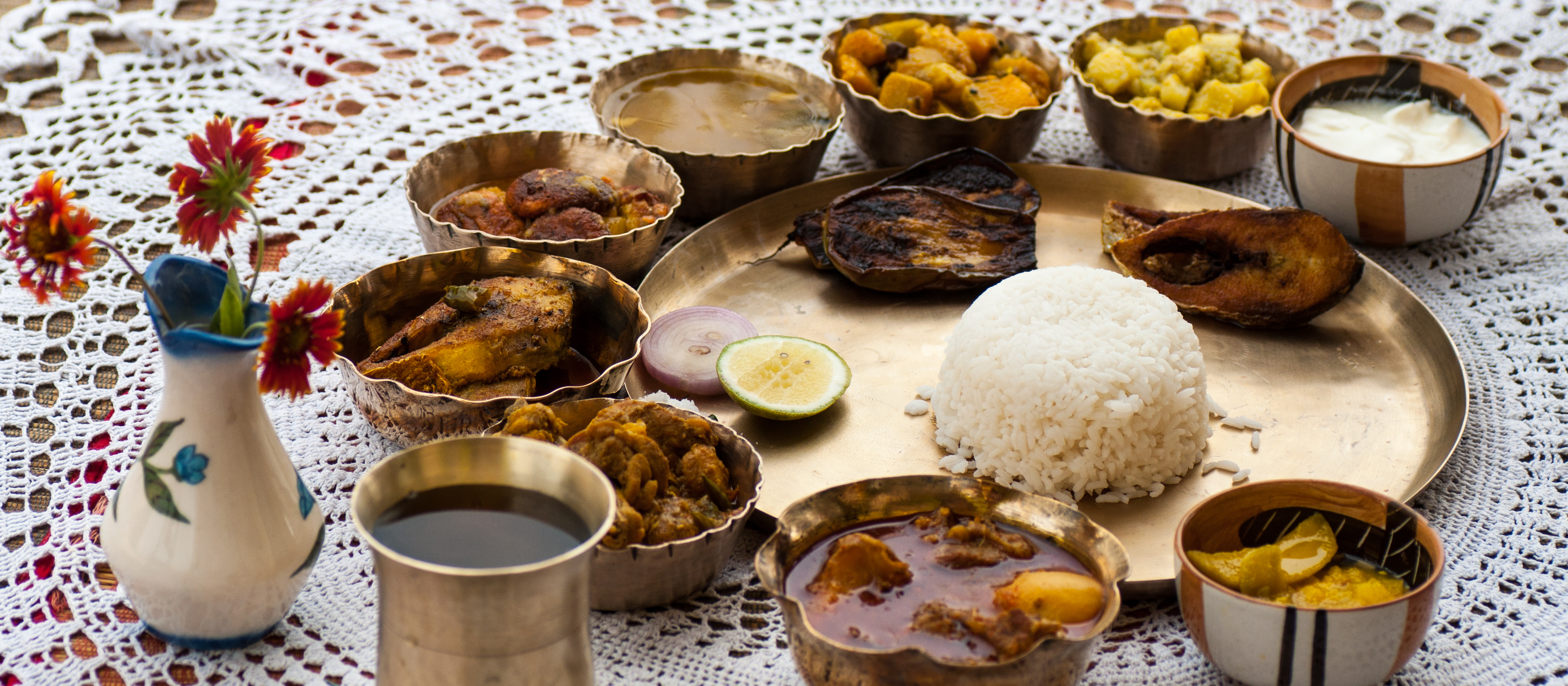
Arrangement of Bengali food

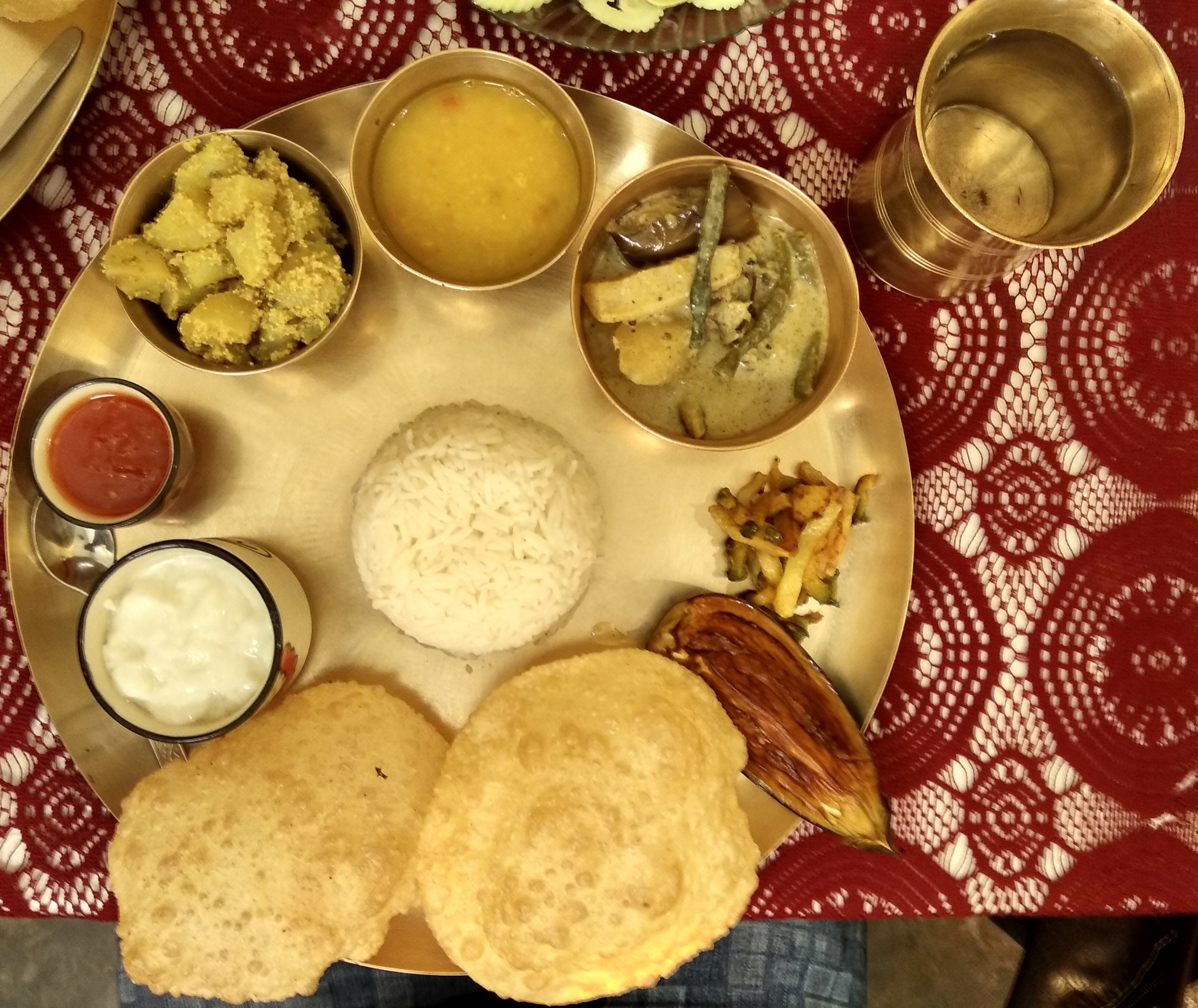
Bengali vegetarian meal

== See also ==
- Bangladeshi cuisine
- List of Bangladeshi dishes
- List of Bengali spices
- Chaunk
