= Kala Bhuna =

Bangladeshi meat curry

Kala bhuna
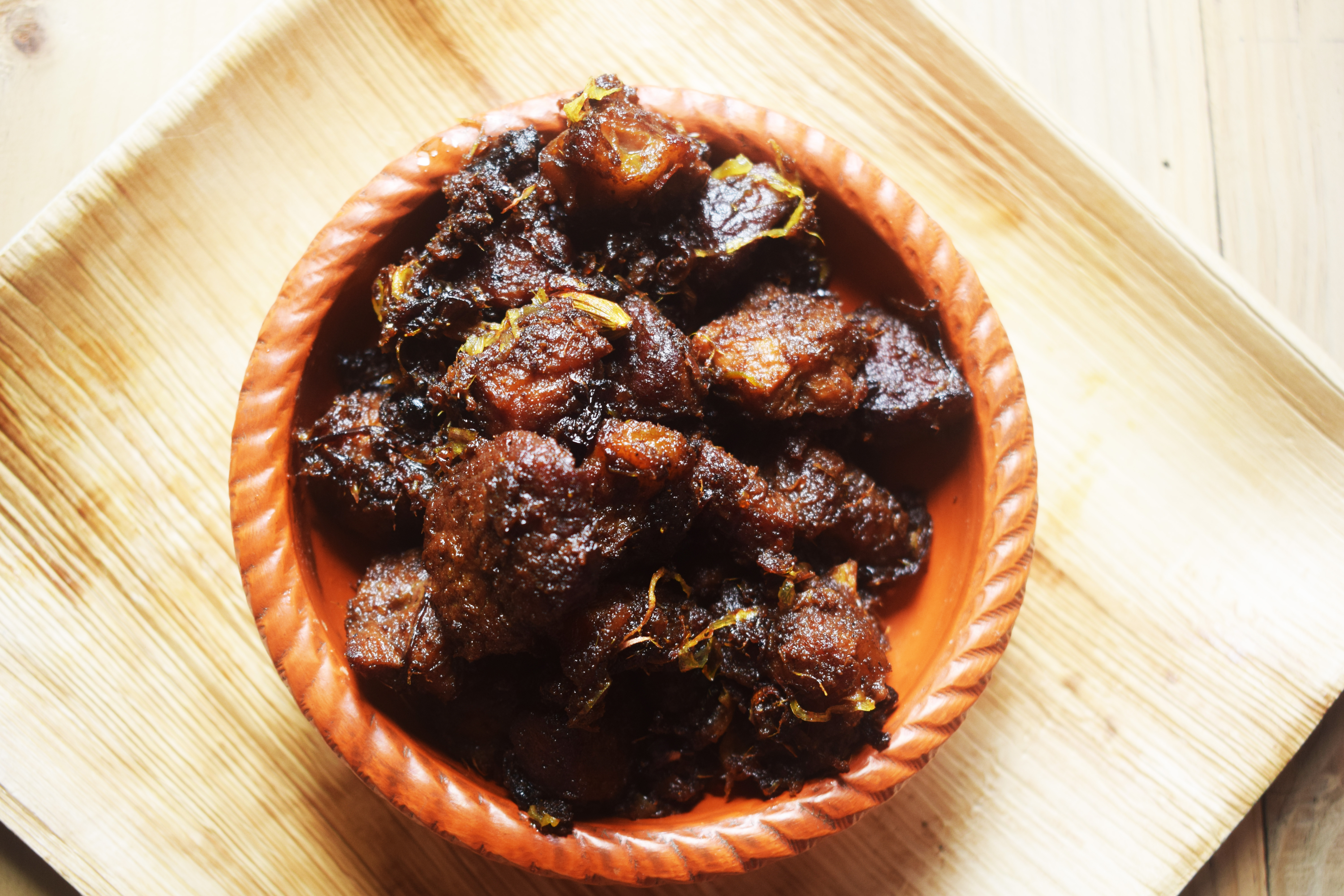
- Beef Kala bhuna
- Alternative names: Kalo bhuna, Kalo vuna, Hala ভুন
- Type: curry
- Course: main course
- Place of origin: Bangladesh
- Region or state: Chittagong Division
- Associated cuisine: Bangladesh
- Serving temperature: hot
- Main ingredients: beef or mutton, Bangladeshi spices
- Variations: Mezbani Kala bhuna

Kala bhuna (Bengali: কালা ভুনা, Chittagonian: হালা ভুনো, romanized: Hala bhuno) is a meat curry made of beef or mutton, originating from Chittagong, Bangladesh. Different types of spices are needed to prepare this traditional dish of Chittagong. In Bengali, the word kala means black and bhuna denotes a South Asian style of cooking where spices and ingredients in curries are fried until richly flavoured and thickened. Kala bhuna gets its name from its appearance, as the meat goes blackish during a long process of deep frying it with plenty of spices. It has become popular also in other Bangladeshi cities like Sylhet, Khulna, Dhaka etc. Nowadays, this dish is a favourite delicacy in mezban feasts, at the Muslim holiday of eid, Bengali Muslim weddings, and in sehri or iftar during the time of Ramadan. Usually, Kala bhuna is eaten with plain rice, pilao, paratha, naan or roti.

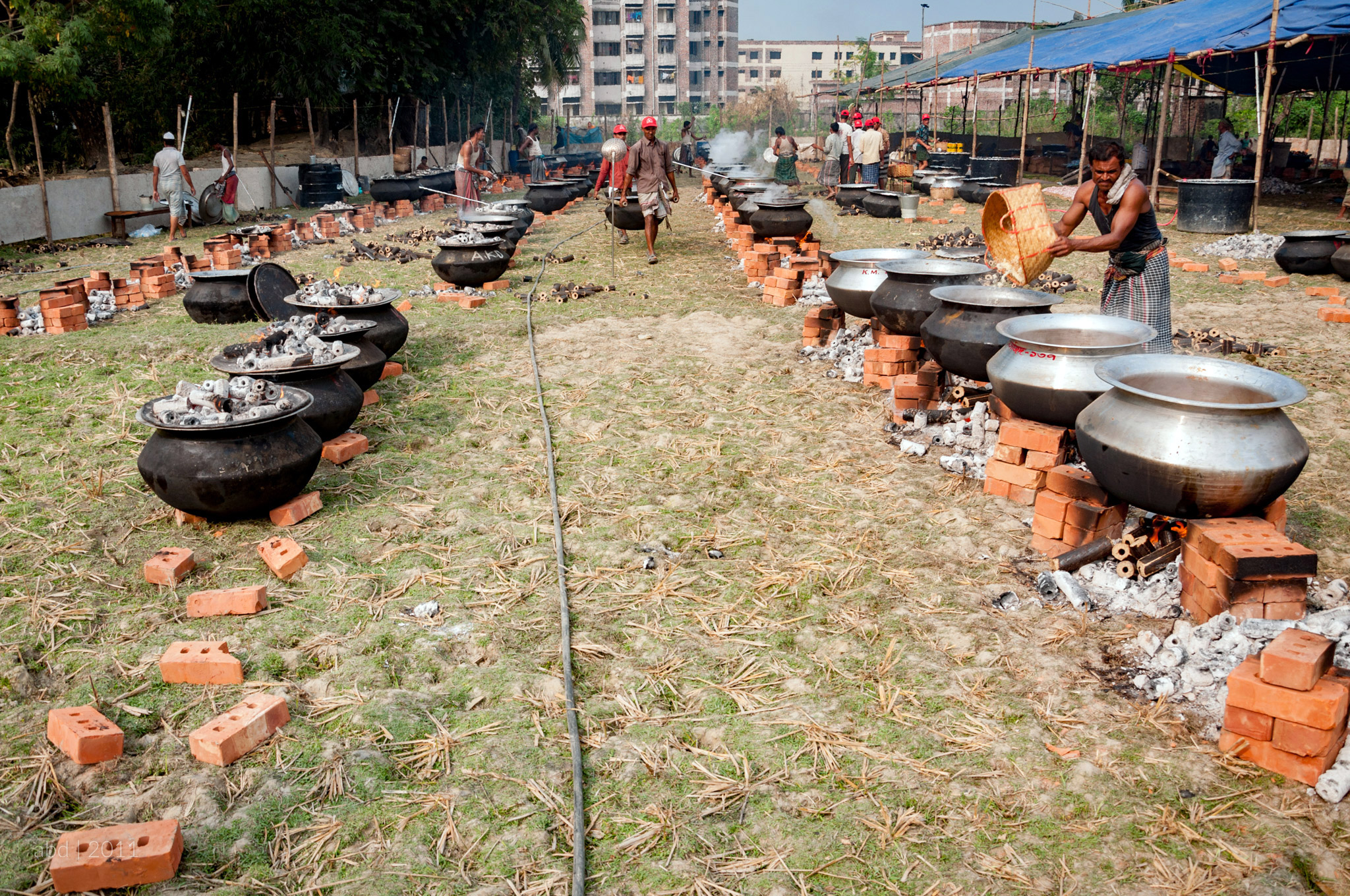
Traditional kala bhuna preparation for the Mezban festival, Chittagong, Bangladesh

== Ingredients ==
Kala bhuna can be made of both beef and mutton, but beef is more popular. This meat dish is cooked with various ingredients by adding them gradually. The ingredients used in it are beef or mutton, chopped and cubed onion, ginger, garlic, chili, cumin, coriander, cardamom, cinnamon, cloves, turmeric, black pepper, salt, mustard oil, garam masala, nutmeg, and toasted cumin.

== See also ==
- Curry
- Bhuna
- Bengali cuisine
