= Mezban =

Social festival of Chittagong, Bangladesh

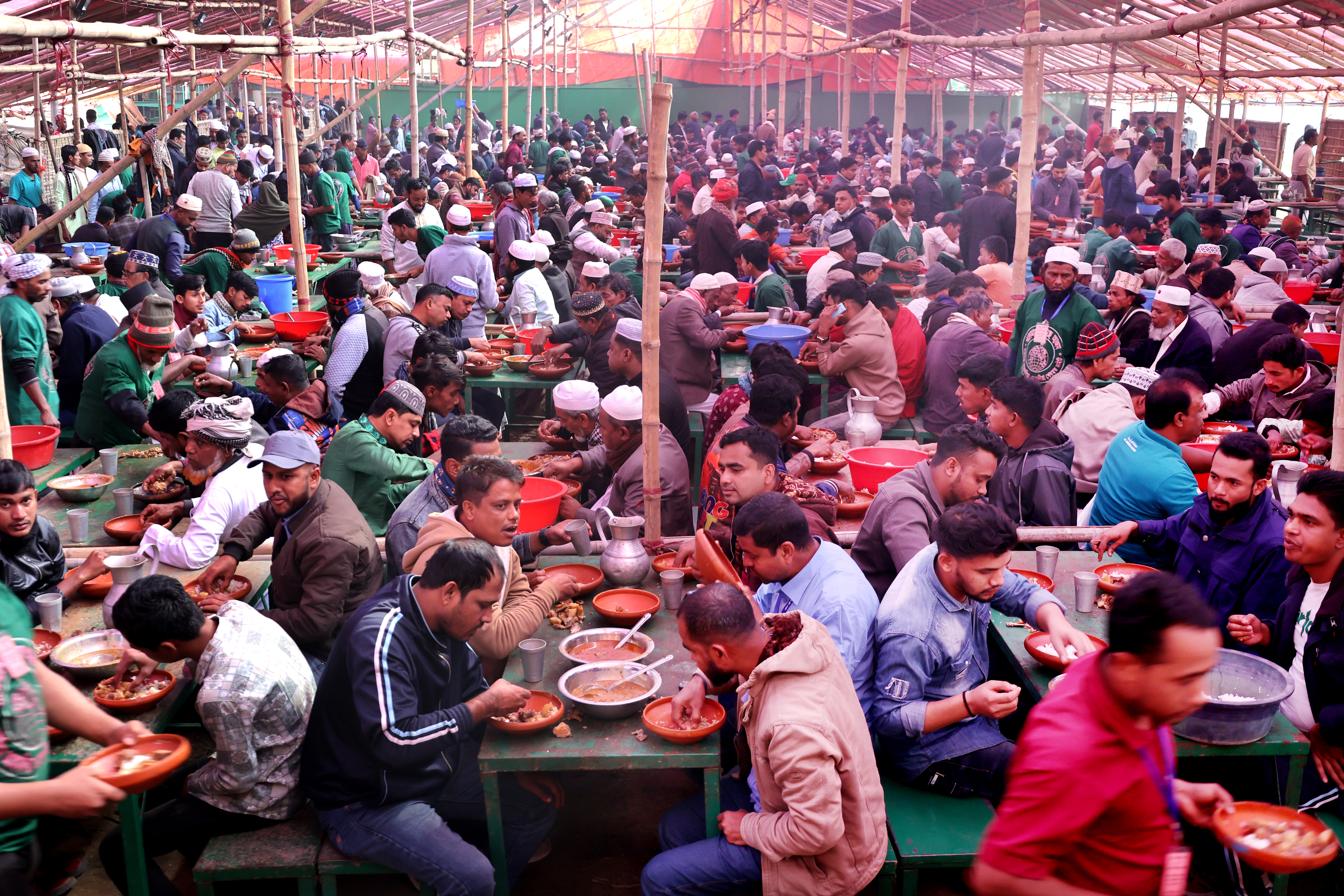
Mezbani food being served to the guests.

Mezban (Bengali: মেজবান), locally known as Mejjan (Chittagonian: মেজ্জান) is a popular festival held in Chittagong, Bangladesh. Historically Mezban is a traditional regional Bengali feast and nowadays refers to both the regional tradition and the feast that results in common usage. The famous Mezbani meal consisting of steamed white rice and hot beef, usually along with other dishes like 'chonar daal' or curry of mung bean and beef fat chunks, 'nolar kanzi' or beef bone marrow soup, and the kala bhuna or dried beef with onions.

== Etymology and history ==
Another name for the festival is Mejjan. The word "Mezban" is ultimately of Persian origin and means host.

== Cooking techniques ==
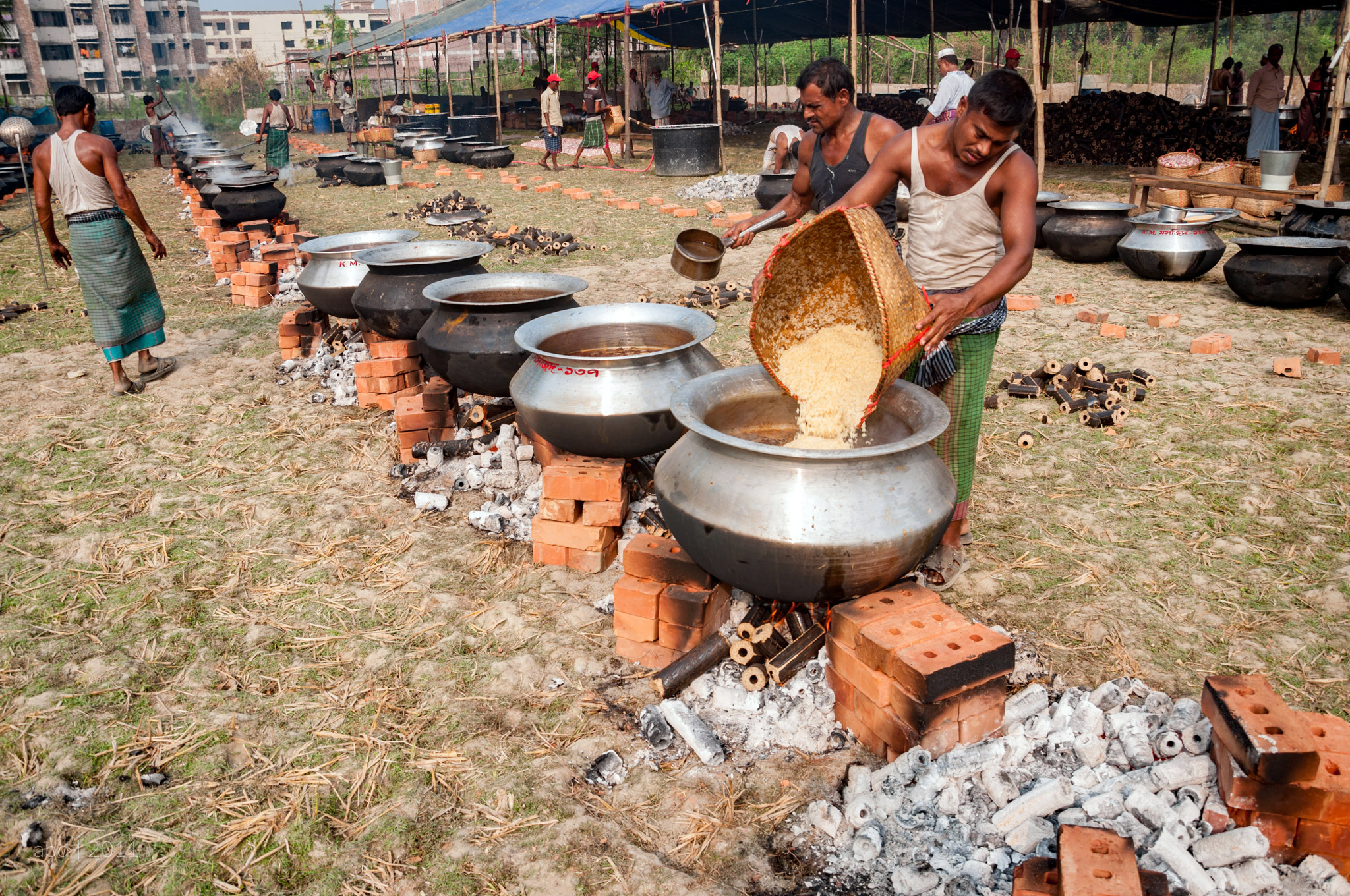
Mezban cooking in Chittagong

Traditionally Mezban is a beef-dominated meal. Proper Mezban meat demands a certain skill. It uses every kind of meat from a cow, like bones, fats, liver etc.

== Celebrations ==
Since the late 1960s, Mezbani has been celebrated.
