= List of Bangladeshi spices =

Bangladeshi spices include a variety of spices that are grown across South and Southeast Asia. Many of the spices are native to the region of Bangladesh, while the others were imported from similar climates and have since been cultivated locally for centuries.

Spices are typically heated in a pan with ghee or cooking oil before being added to a dish. Lighter spices are added last, and spices with strong flavor should be added first. Curry is not a spice, but a term which refers to any side dish in Bangladeshi cuisine. It could be with a sauce base or a dry item. A curry typically contains several spices blended together.

== List of Bangladeshi spices ==
Below is a list of spices and other flavoring substances commonly used in Bangladesh.

Image	English name	Bangla name		Comments
	Ginger	আদা	Aada	Used as fresh and also dried powder form.
	Amchoor	আমচুর	Aamchur	Dried green mango powder that gives fish curries tartness.
	Celery / radhuni seed	রাধুনী	Raadhuni	
	Ajwain	জোয়ান	Jowaan	
	Indian gooseberry	আমলকি	Aamloki	Used as pickle, green and ripe fruits. dried and powder fruit are used to treat damage hair.
Pomegranate	Pomegranate seed	ডালিম	Dalim	Used in cake and desserts, and to decorate food
	Tulsi or Basil	তুলসী	Tulsi	Leaves are used to treat cold
Almond	Almond	কাঠবাদাম	Kaath-Baadam	
Cardamom	Green cardamom	এলাচ	Elaach	Used in cooking food and desserts to increase flavor.
	Black cardamom	বড় এলাচ	Boro elaach	Very earthy and darkly aromatic.
	Cinnamon	দারচিনি	Daarchini	Give aromatic flavor in food.
	Coriander seed	ধনে	Dhone	
	Garam masala	গরম মশলা	Garam Mashla	Blend of spices which varies between regions and households.
Rose Water	Rose water	গোলাপ জল	Golap Jol	Flavors desserts. Used more often in dishes with origins in the middle east.
	Gurh (Jaggery)	গুড়	Gurh	from the sap of the sugarcane, coconut palm or date palm
	Turmeric	হলুদ	Holud	Source of "yellow color" in many dishes.
	Coriander leaf	ধনিয়া পাতা	Dhoniya Pata	Fresh green leaves, also called cilantro. Give flavor. Used as pickle.
	Terminalia chebula	হরিতকি	Horitoki	
	Green chili pepper	কাঁচা মরিচ/ কাঁচা লঙ্কা	Kancha morich/Kancha lonka	
	Coriander powder	ধনিয়া গুঁড়া	Dhoniya Gura	
	Tamarind	তেঁতুল	Tetul	Used as pickle.
	Nutmeg	জায়ফল	Jaifol	
	Mace	জয়িত্রি	Joyitri	Mace is outer covering of nutmeg nut with similar aroma.
	Cumin seed	জিরা	Jeera	Give flavor to dishes. Have some medicinal uses like used to lose weight.
	Whole Cumin	গোটা জিরে	Gota Jire	
	Curry Leaf	কারিপাতা	Karipata	Only used fresh.
	Neem Leaf	নিম পাতা	Nim Pata	
Kaju Badam	Cashew nut	কাজুবাদাম	Kaju Badam	Kaju Badam is widely known as Cashew Nuts.
	Black salt	বিট নুন / বিট লবণ	Bit Noon / Bit Lobon	
	Black cardamom	কালো এলাচ	Kalo Elaach	Earthy fragrance used in Mughal inspired dishes.
	Black pepper	গোল মরিচ	Gol Morich	Powder pepper is used widely in different dishes.
	Nigella seed	কালো জিরা	Kalo Jeera	
	Fenugreek leaf	মেথি পাতা	Methi Pata	
	Cubeb	কাবাব চিনি	Kabab Chini	
	Saffron	জাফরান	Jafran	Dry saffron is used as food color.
	Dates	খেজুর	Khejur	
	Poppy seed	পোস্ত	Posto	
	Garlic	রসুন	Rosun	
	Dry Red Chilli	শুকনো লঙ্কা / লাল মরিচ	Shukno Lanka / Lal Morich	
	Cloves	লবঙ্গ	Labongo	
	Fenugreek leaf	মেথি পাতা ..	Methi Pata	
	Fenugreek seed	মেথি দানা	Methi Dana	
	Salt	নুন / লবণ/	Noon / Lobon	
	Citron	লেবু	Lebu	Used fresh and ripe as Juice and with food.. Source of Vitamin C.
	Gandharaj Lime	গন্ধরাজ লেবু	Gandharaj Lebu	
	Makrut Lime	কাগ্জি লেবু	Kagji Lebu	
	Sweet Lemon	শিরিন লেবু	Shirin Lebu	
	Mint	পুদিনা	Pudina	
	Shallot	পেঁয়াজ কলি	Peyanj Koli	
	Scallion	পেঁয়াজ পাতা	Peyanj Pata	
	Panch Phoron	পাঁচ ফোড়ন	Panch Foron	This is a Bengali spice mix that combines fennel, cumin, fenugreek, mustard and nigella
	Long pepper	পিপুল	Pipul	
	Bell pepper	কাপ্সিকুম/ক্যাপসিকাম	Kapsikum	
	Brown mustard seed	রাই/ সর্ষে / সরিষা	Raai/Shorshe/Shorisha	
	White pepper	সাদা সর্ষে / সাদা সরিষা	Saada Sorshe/ Saada Shorisha	
	Mustard seed	সর্ষে	Shorshe	
	Mustard oil	সর্ষের তেল	Shorsher tæl	
	Fennel seed	মৌরি	Mouri	
	Black Cumin	কালো জিরে	Kalo Jira	Sweet, floral and smoky cumin and anise-like flavor. Smaller than regular cumin. Often mistaken for caraway seed. Though English translation is black cumin, the term black cumin is also used as English translation of Nigella sativa, kalonji
	Vinegar	সির্কা	Shirka	
	Dried ginger	শুকানো আদা গুড়ো	Shukano Ada Gura	Mostly powdered
	Indian bay leaf	তেজ পাতা	Tej pata	
	Sesame seed	তিল	Teel	
	Heeng (Asafoetida)	হিঙ	Heeng	

== See also ==
- Bangladeshi cuisine
- Spice trade
