= Bangladeshi cuisine =

Culinary traditions of Bangladesh

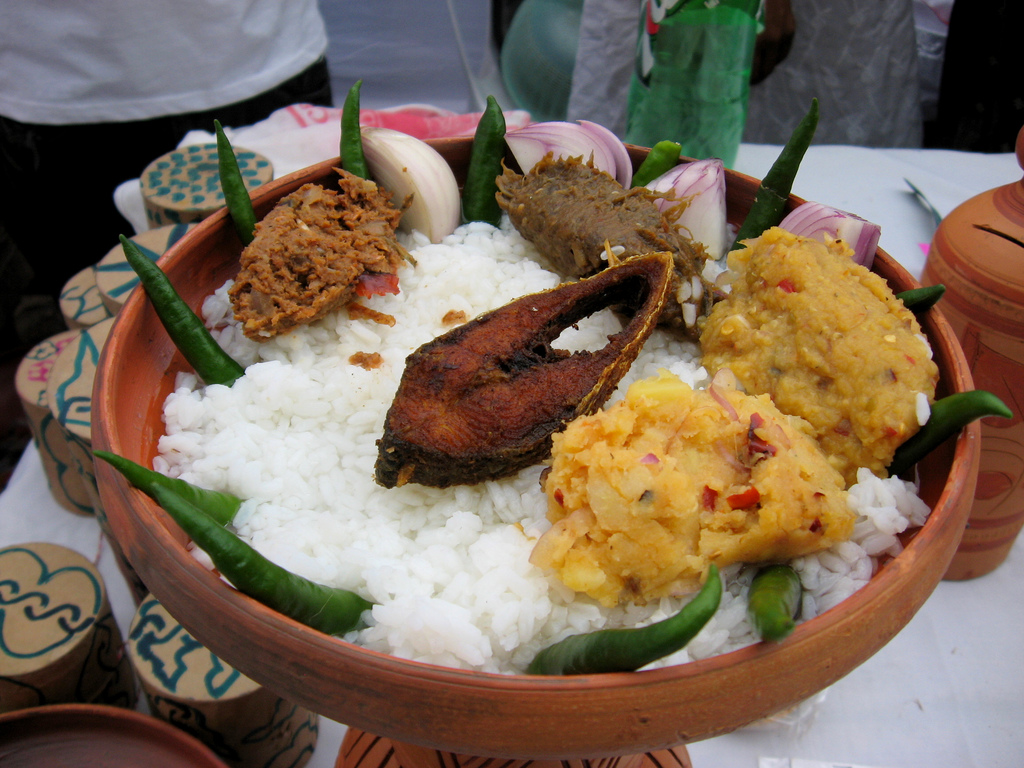
Traditional pohela boishak meal with ilish

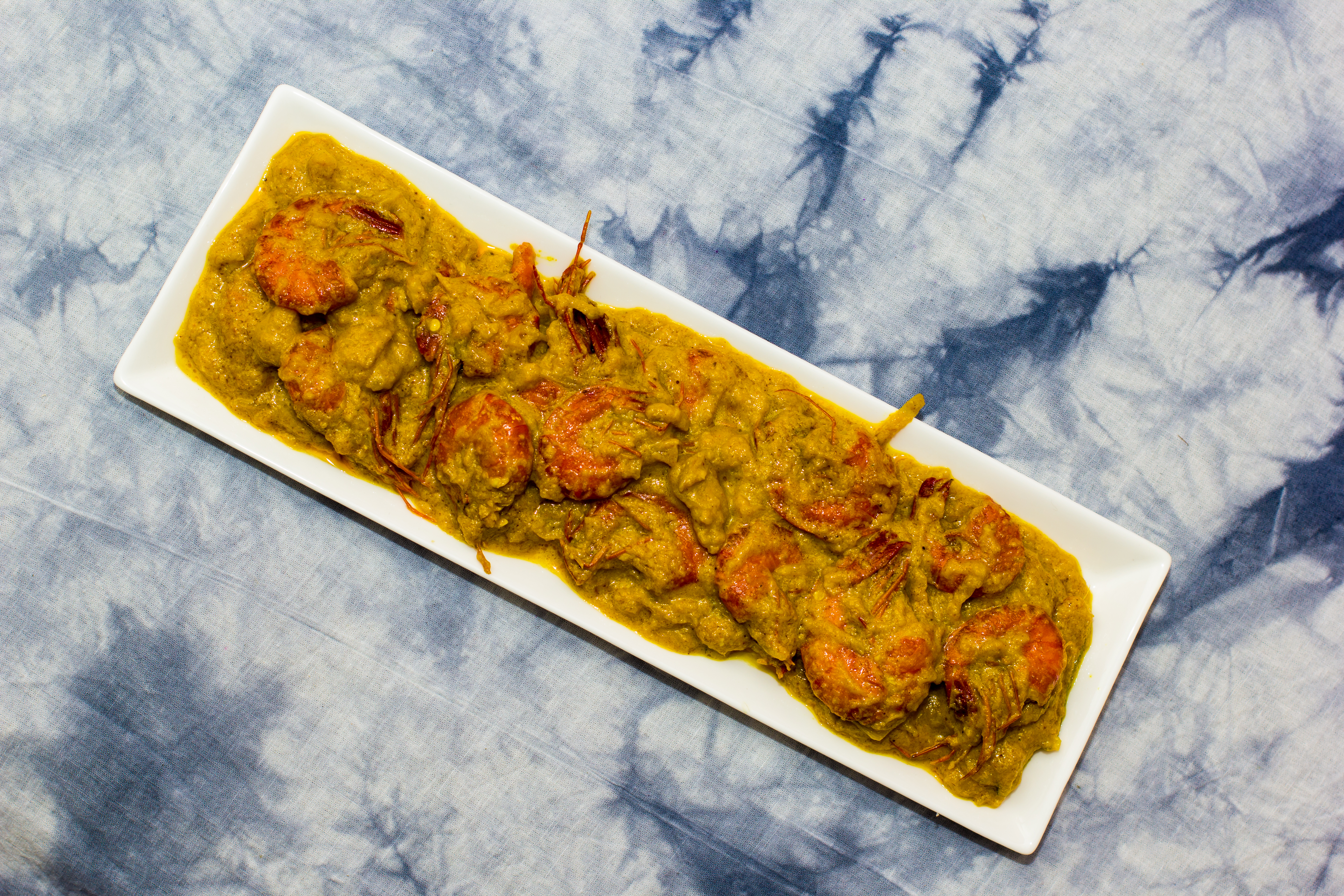
Prawn curry cooked with coconut milk

Samosa, a popular snack

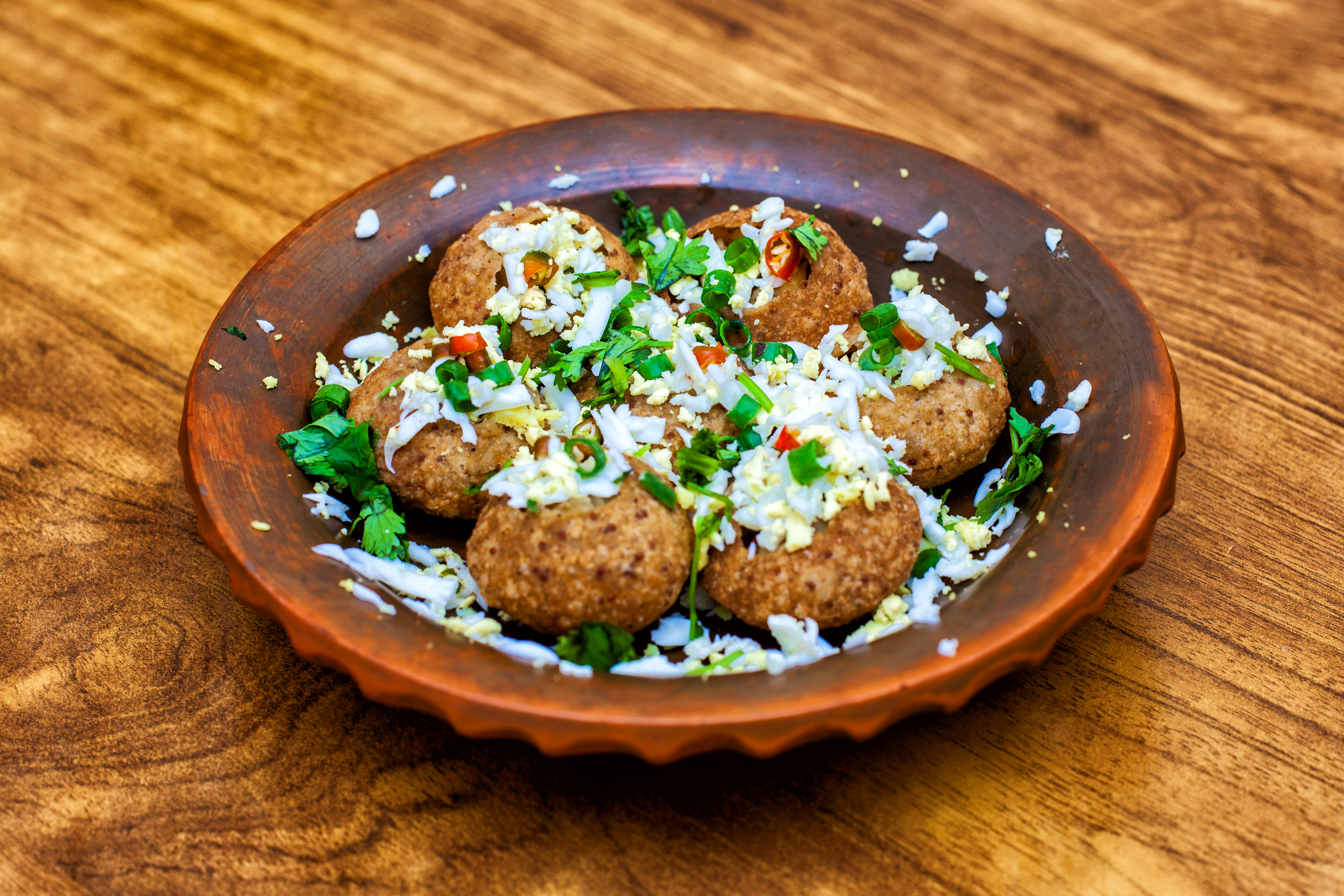
Fuchka, a popular street food

Bangladeshi cuisine has been shaped by the region's history and riverine geography. Bangladesh has a tropical monsoon climate. The staple foods of Bangladesh are rice and fish. The majority of Bangladeshi people are ethnic Bengali, with a minority of non-Bengalis, many of whom are used to cuisines from different traditions and regions.

== History ==
Bangladeshi culinary habits were strongly influenced by the cuisine and culture of the area's history of Mughal rulers. Dhaka was the Mughal capital of the Bengal Subah and a major trading center in South Asia. Traders, immigrants and visitors brought culinary styles from around the world, which influenced the city's cuisine. After Dhaka became the capital of East Bengal; Persian, Turkish and Arabic-influenced dishes became popular. Black pepper and chui jhal were used to add spiciness before chili was introduced from the Americas.

== Culinary style and influences ==
Rice is the staple food of Bangladesh, while fish is the most common source of protein in Bangladesh. There are 250 plant-based ingredients in Bangladeshi cooking. The use of mustard oil was the traditional edible oil before soybean oil was introduced.

== Specialties by region ==
=== Dhaka ===
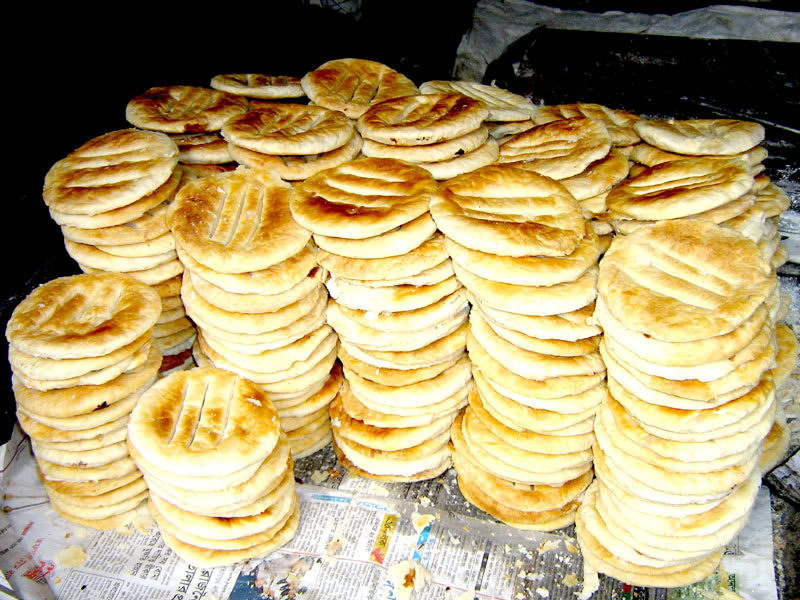
Bakarkhani in Dhaka, Bangladesh

The culinary customs of the nation's capital have been influenced by Mughlai, Central Asian, Armenian, Persian and native Bengali cuisines. The city's cuisine also has unique local dishes.

The Nawabs of Dhaka brought Mughlai cuisine to Bengal. Mughlai cuisine, which is often lavish and expensive, was out of reach for many people for many centuries. It became more widespread as Bangladesh's economy grew. It is characterised by the use of meat and dairy ingredients, such as lamb, goat, beef, and yogurt together with mild spices. Its dishes include kebab, stuffed breads, kacchi biriyani, duck, and chicken, patisapta and others. Kashmiri tea and korma are still served on special occasions, like Eid and weddings.

Chowk Bazaar in Old Dhaka is a centuries-old food market and a focal point during Ramadan for the Iftar meal after sunset.

Dhakaiya paratha is a multi-layered bread that found popularity in Kolkata, when immigrants from Dhaka introduced it there following the Partition of India.

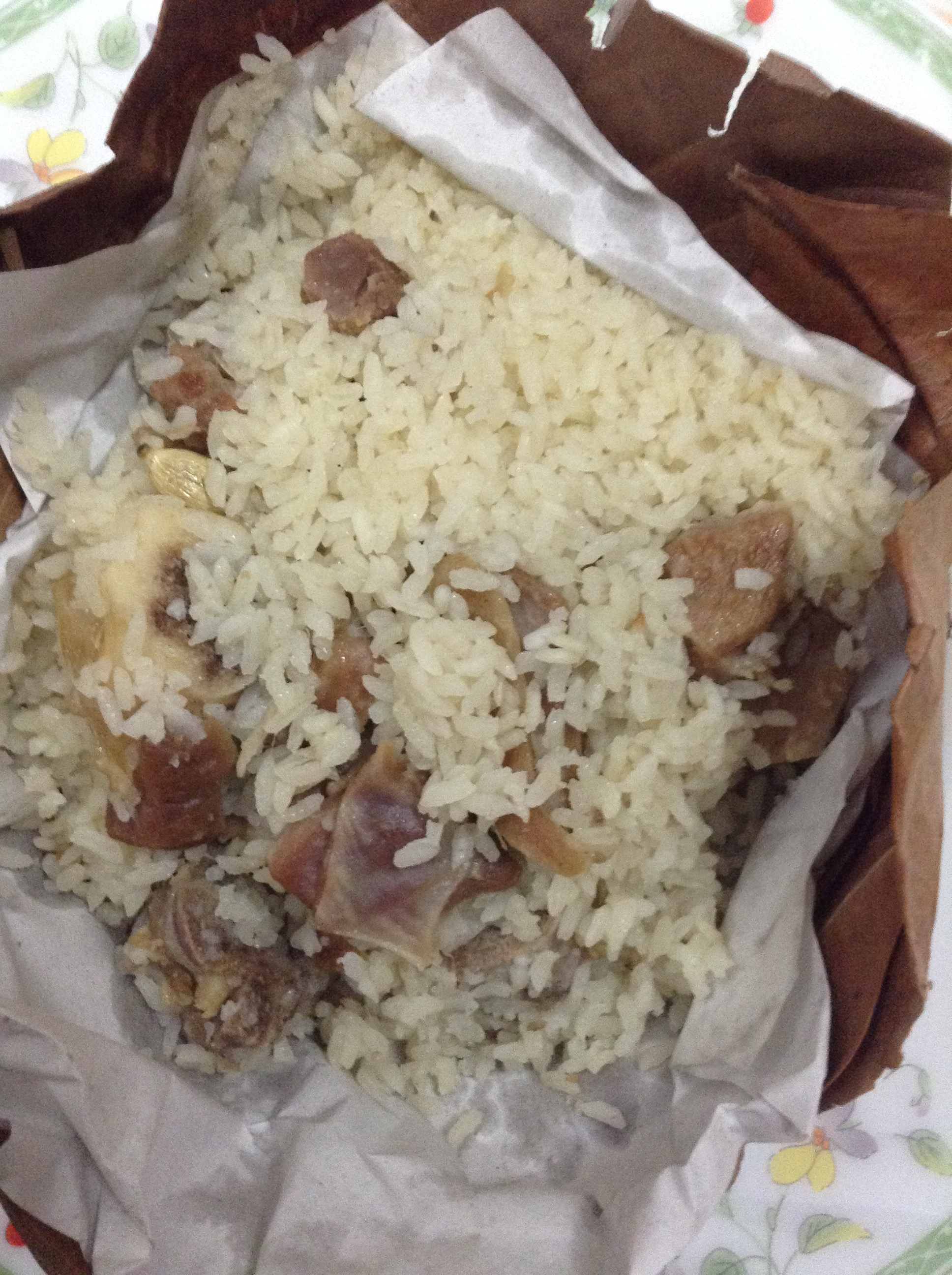
Haji Biriyani

Haji biryani is a rice dish originating from a Dhaka restaurant of the same name. The dish consists of rice, goat meat and spices.

Bakarkhani is a thick, spiced flat-bread from Mughlai cuisine often served with tea. Dhakai Bakarkhani is the variant found in Dhaka, where it has been prepared for centuries.

Morog pulao is a signature dish of the city; it is an aromatic rice pilaf with chicken.

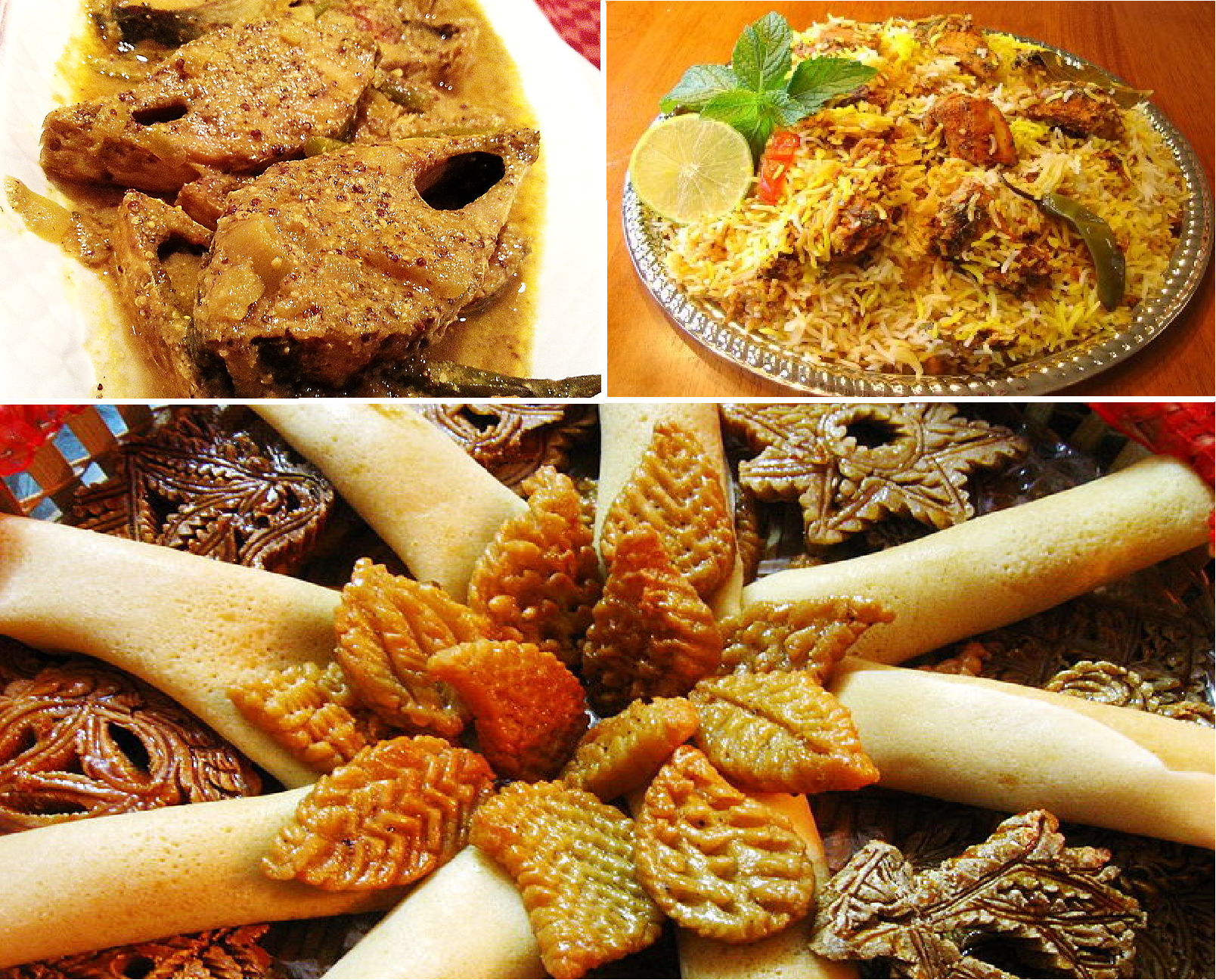
Traditional meal: mustard seed Ilish curry, Dhakai biryani and pitha

=== Chittagong Division ===
In Chittagong and the surrounding region, curries are generally highly spiced and often include beef. Mejbani Gosht is a beef curry for special occasions; a Mejban or Mezban is a communal feast.

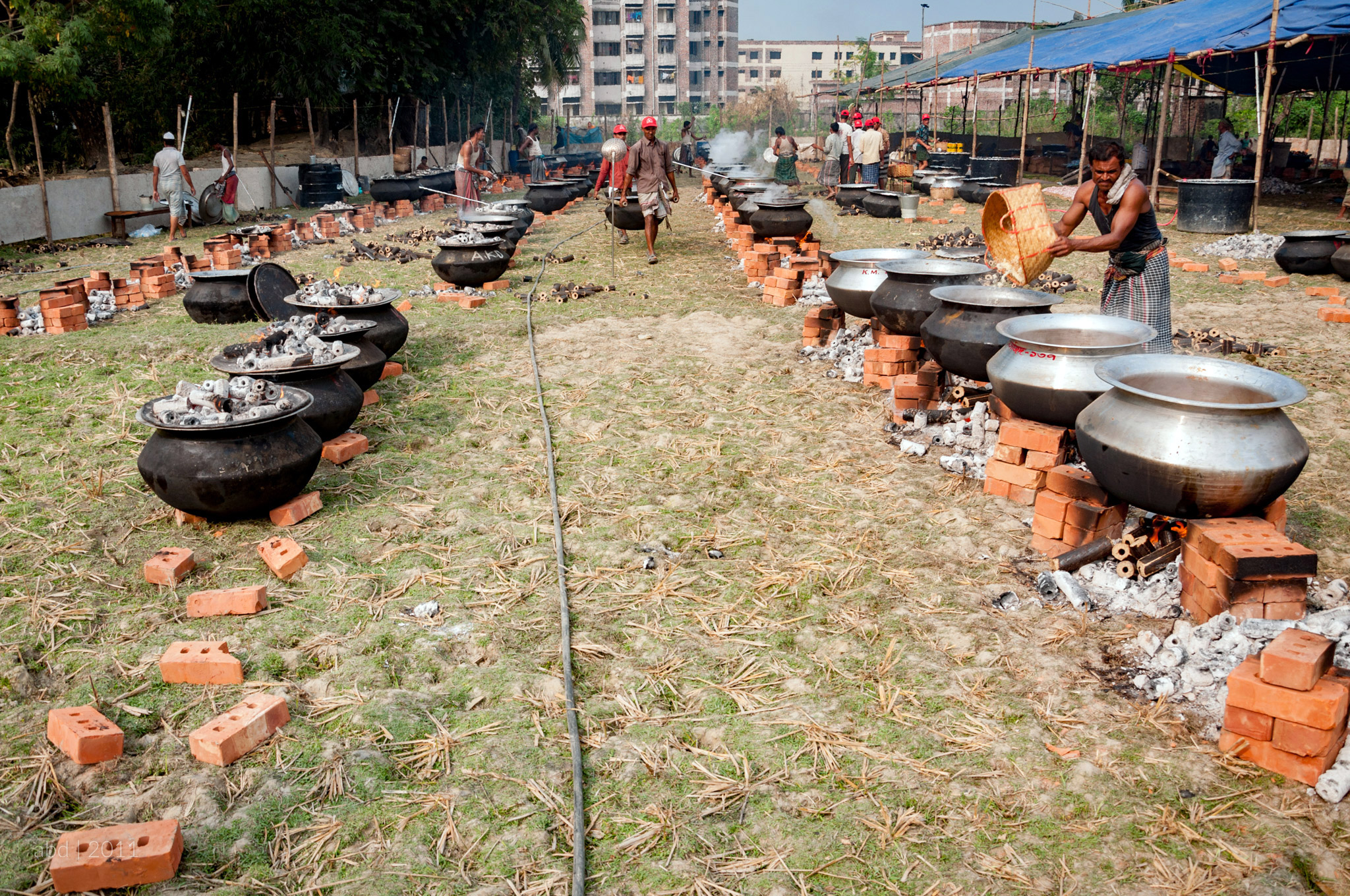
Mezban preparations

Beef dishes are popular with Bengali Muslims and are often served at Mezban feasts, where they indicate prosperity.

Hindus tend to cook with fish rather than beef. The Hindu community of Chittagong organises Mezban feasts each year as "Chittagong Parishad", with curries of fish and vegetables.

Kala bhuna, blackened beef, is a dish from Chittagong made of beef shoulder cooked with spices until dark and tender.

Durus kura or duroos is a dish comprising a whole chicken cooked in thick broth, served with rice, either as polao or khichuri. It is also a part of Rohingya Cuisine.

Akhni, also commonly known as Orosher Biriyani is a biriyani variant made with chinigura rice (an aromatic, short-grained rice). It contains cubes of beef or goat meat with potatoes and dried fruits.

Chittagong is near the coast and has several dishes using sea fish, including rupchanda (silver pomfret) and loita (Bombay duck). Shutki is cured and dried loita, a pungent delicacy typical of the region. Churi (ribbonfish) is dried then cooked with chili and onions. Koral/bhetki (barramundi) and giant tiger prawns from the Bay of Bengal are eaten in coastal regions.

=== Chittagong Hill Tracts ===
The Chittagong Hill Tracts are home to tribes with their own culture and cuisine. Chakma cuisine uses sidol, a paste made from fermented shrimps and fish, and suguni, dried shrimp or fish. Their dishes use more herbs from the hills more than the spices common in Bengali dishes. Important seasonal ingredients include wild mushrooms and the Flowers of ginger and turmeric plants. Sumoh gorang is a dish cooked in bamboo and Hebaang is baked in banana leaves in a mud oven. Marma cuisine uses a paste of dried fish called nappi. Rice beer is a popular drink.

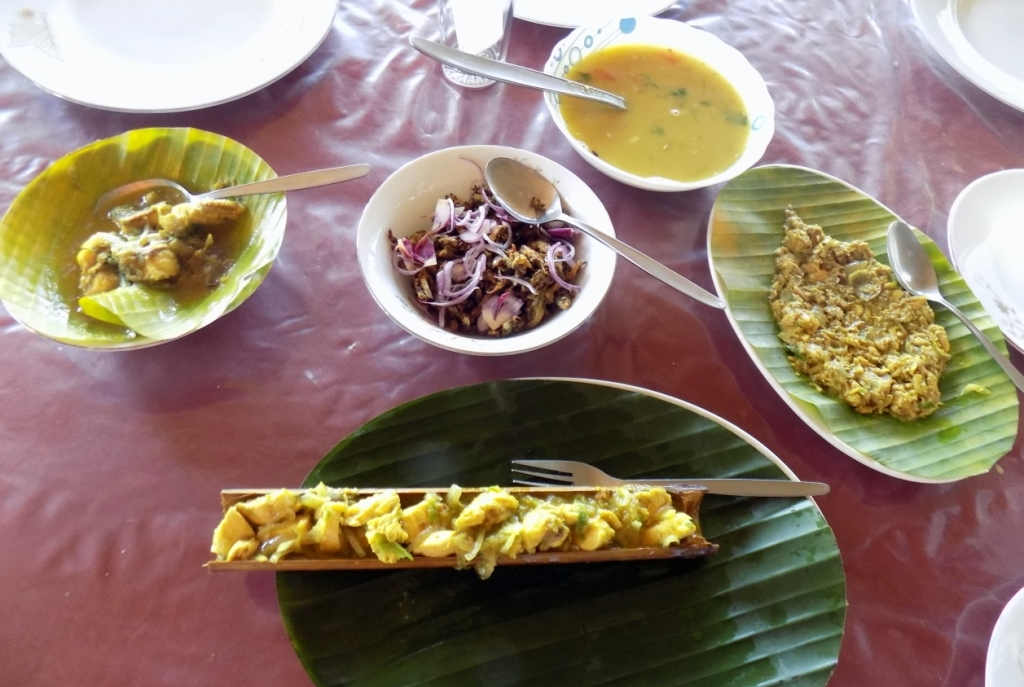
Tribal food in Chittagong hill tracts

=== Greater Mymensingh ===
In Mymensingh doi yogurt is often combined with puffed or flattened rice.

Monda is a sweet yogurt patty from Muktagachhar, first made in 1824.

The Garo people are an ethnic and religious minority in Mymensingh region with their own unique culture and cuisine. Their cuisine is notable for the use of pork, eel, and turtle meat. The Garo brew liquor at home and cook with soda and in bamboo.

=== Northern Bangladesh ===
Northern Bangladesh has numerous dairy farms that produce yogurt (doi). Yogurt is also made of evaporated milk which gives it a more intense taste, similar to kheer. Biral Upazila is well known for large Koi fish which are baked in banana leaves. Catla fish is commonly cooked in doi yogurt.

Bogra is well known nationally and internationally for its sweet curds.

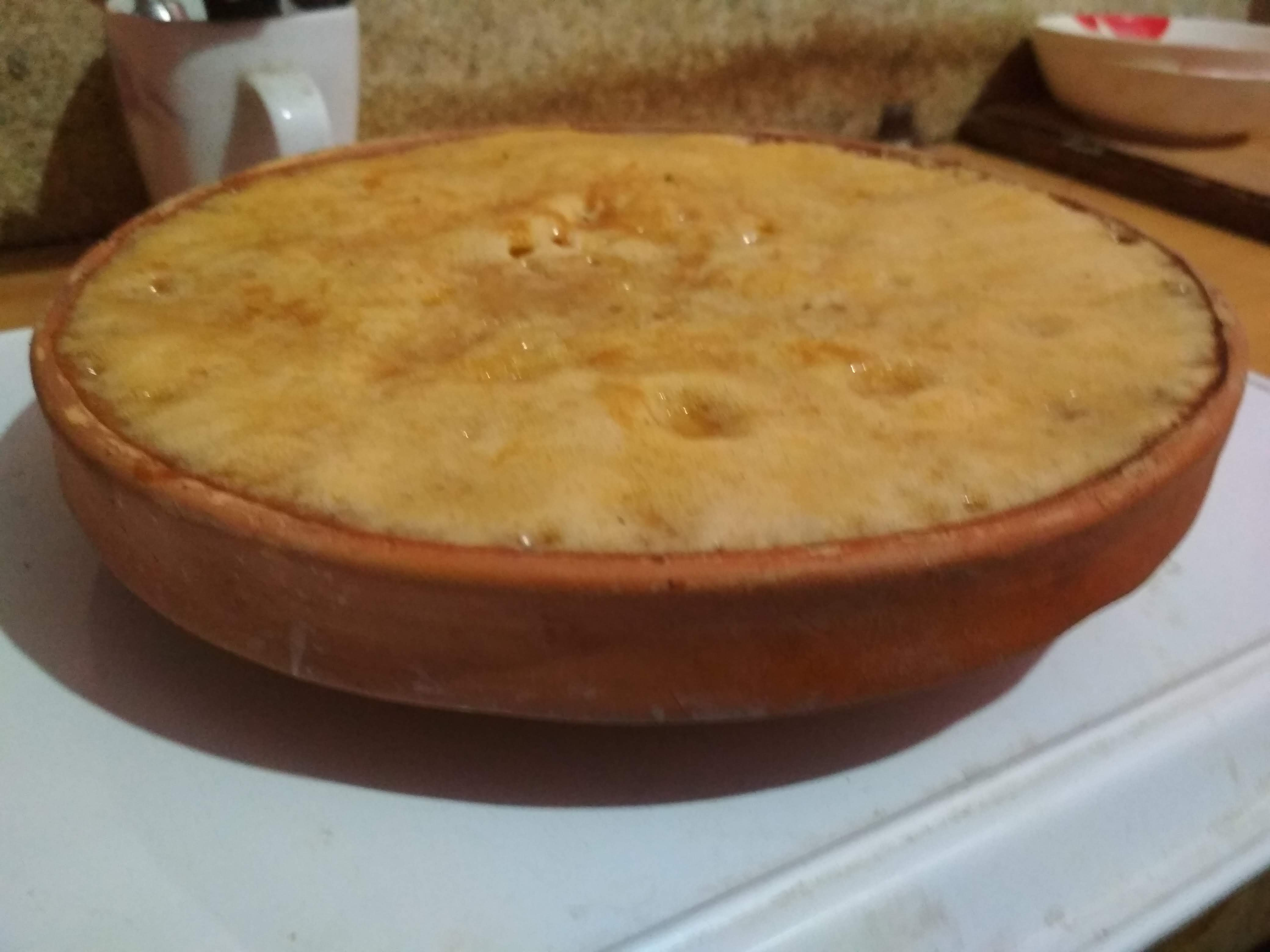
Bograr Doi (curd)

The Rangpur region has a beef dish cooked with pumpkin.

The Santal people in the Rajshahi region eat crab, pork, squirrel, and fish and tend to use fewer spices in their cooking. They produce an alcoholic drink from rice called hadia. They make liquor using palm tree resin which is used for ritual ceremonies.

=== Southern Bangladesh ===
Piper chaba is a fiery aromatic spice grown in South Bengal. It pre-dates the introduction of chilli from the Americas in the 16th century. Its peeled and chopped stem and roots are added to meat and fish dishes.

Barisal, a coastal region, uses coconut in cooking.

=== Sylhet Division ===
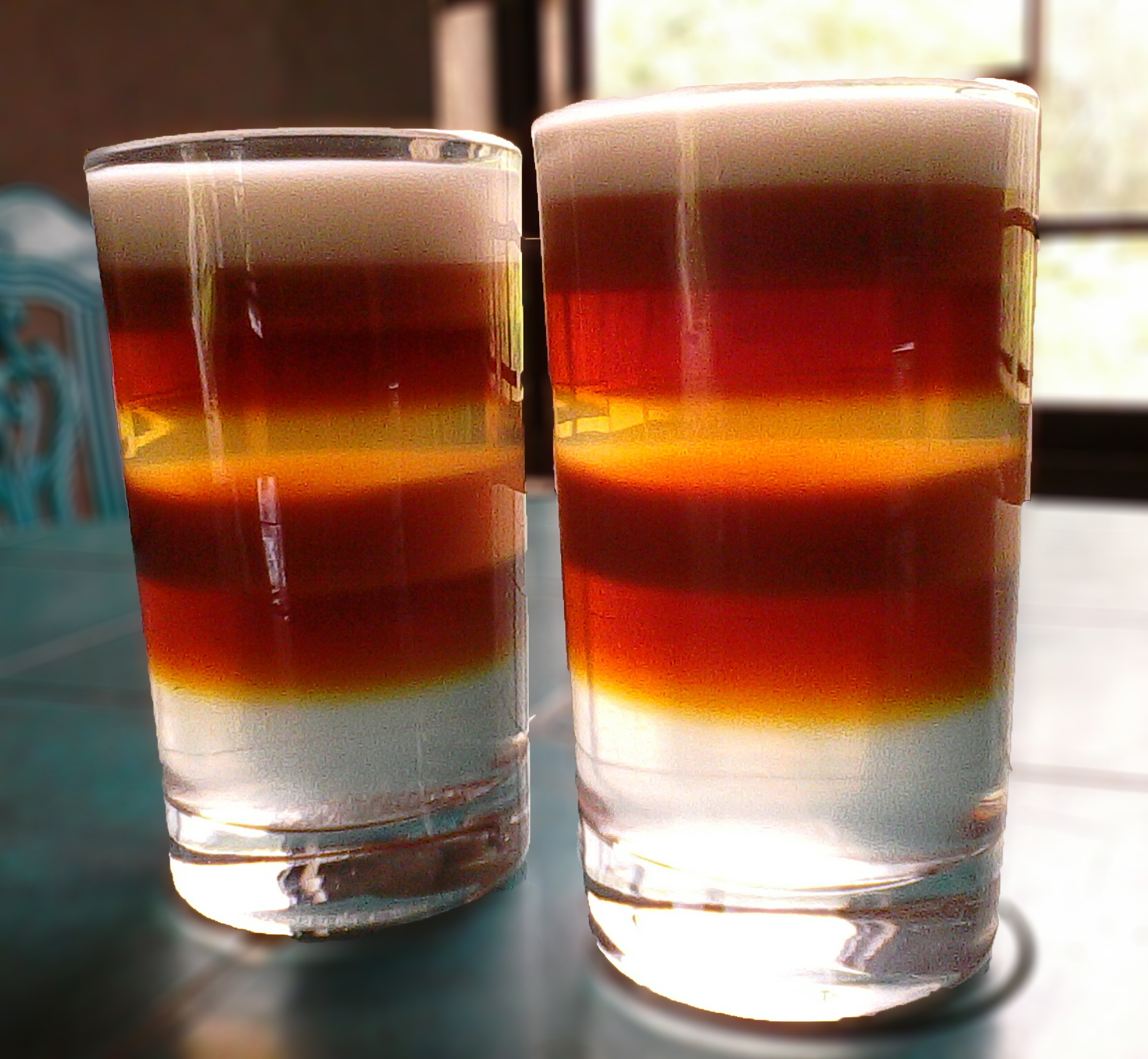
Seven colour tea

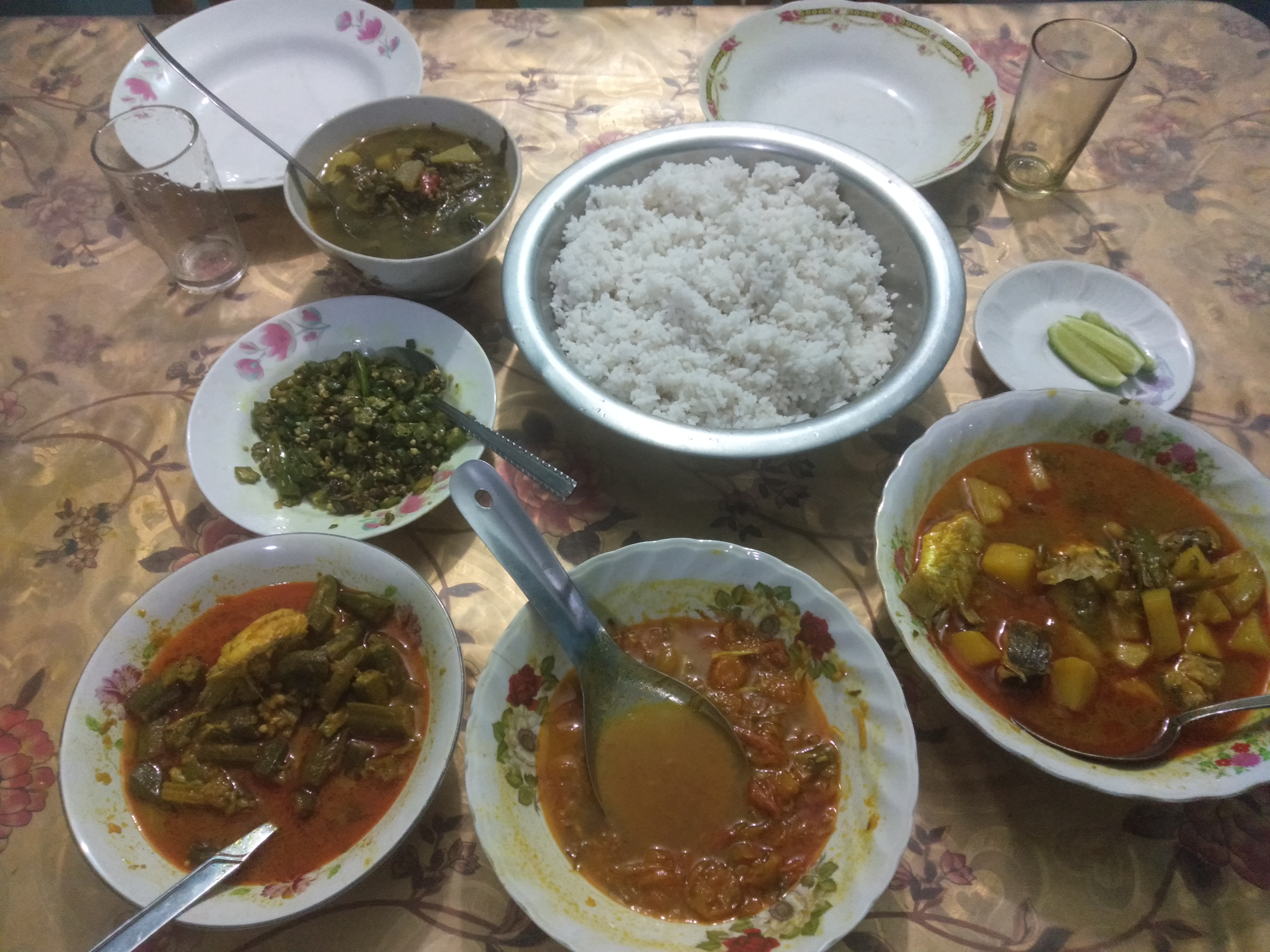
Traditional Sylheti diet

The Sylhet area of Bangladesh has a number of characteristic dishes and ingredients. It is home to several citrus fruit varieties such as hatkora and thoikor, Adajamir or Ada Lebu, and Ashkul Lebu or Ashkoni Lebu that are commonly used in the region's fish and meat dishes. Although Ashkul Lebu or Ashkoni Lebu is unheard of amongst many Sylhetis due to lack of knowledge on it, and it is most likely to be nearly extinct; the juices of Ashkul Lebu is used to make Tenga or Khatta.

==== Rice dishes ====
Akhni is a mixed rice dish similar to biryani or polao, made with meat and/or vegetables.

Red and white Birin rice (also transliterated as Biroin or Bireen) is found only in the Sylhet region. It is eaten in savoury and sweet dishes and is the main ingredient for Chunga Pitha, a traditional rice cake prepared by stuffing sticky rice inside young bamboo and smoking it slowly. The rice cake is removed from the tube and has the shape of a candle. The dish may also be made with milk, sugar, coconut, and rice powder.

Khichuri is a rice dish similar in consistency to porridge. During the holy month of Ramadan, it is served as a staple food for Iftar. It consists of aromatic rice mixed with spices, ghee, cumin and fenugreek. It is also offered to sick people mixed with ginger.

==== Meat dishes ====
Beef Hatkhora is a traditional festive dish of beef cooked with hatkora juice.

Aash Bash is a traditional dish using duck and bamboo shoots. It is also known as Aash ar Khoril.

==== Fish dishes ====
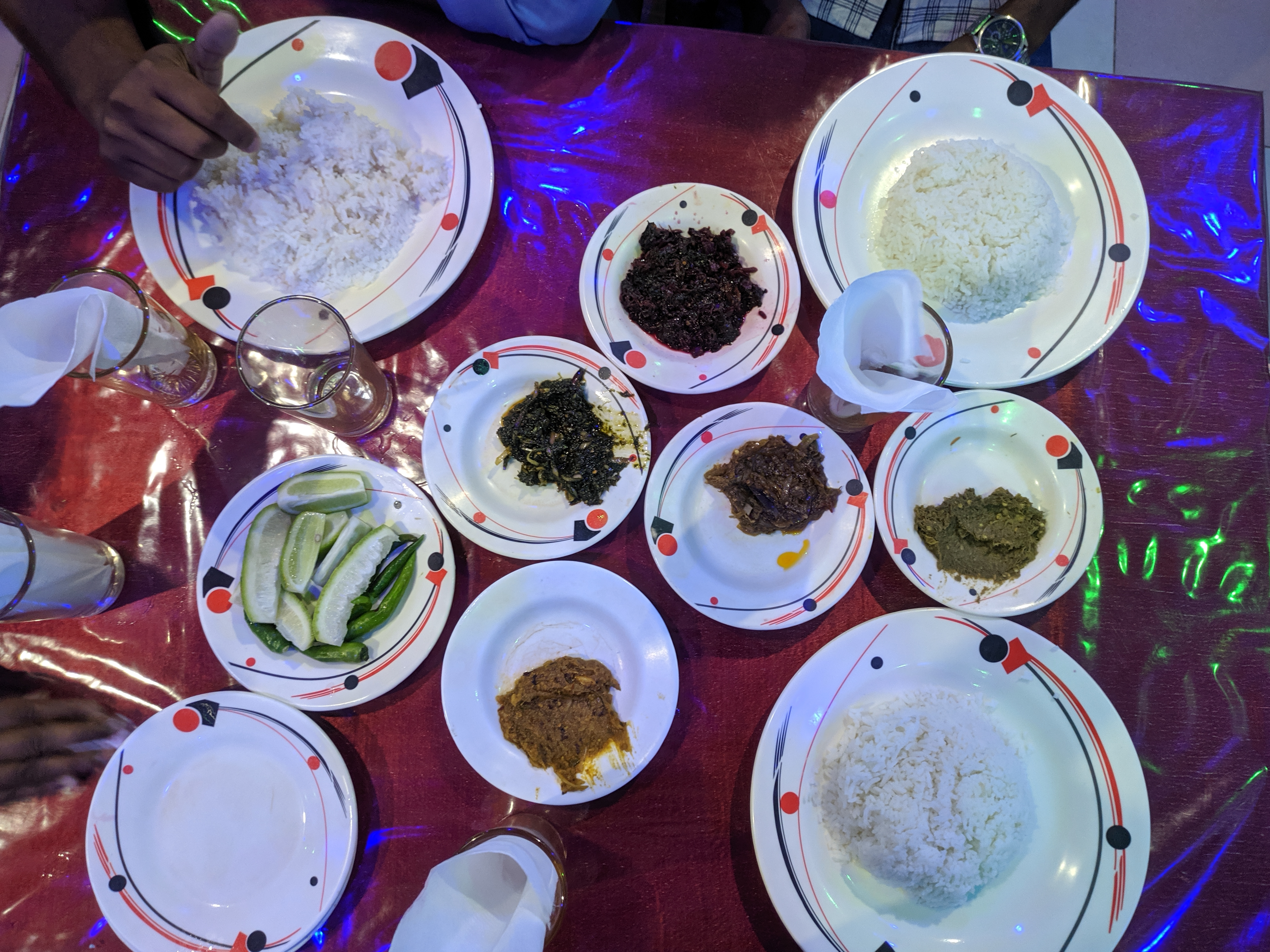
Mashed vegetables

Fish is eaten both curried and fried. Dried and fermented fish called shutki also known by many locals of Sylhet as hutki or hukoin, and hatkora, a bitter and fragrant citrus fruit are used in fish curries. Extremely hot Naga Morich peppers are used in broths.

Some local dishes incorporate hidol, a pungent chutney of dried fish matured in earthenware pots. This includes Hutki Shira, a fish curry with vegetables.

Thoikor Tenga is a dish fish cooked with thoikor, a bitter citrus fruit that grows in the Sylhet region.

==== Other foods from Sylhet ====
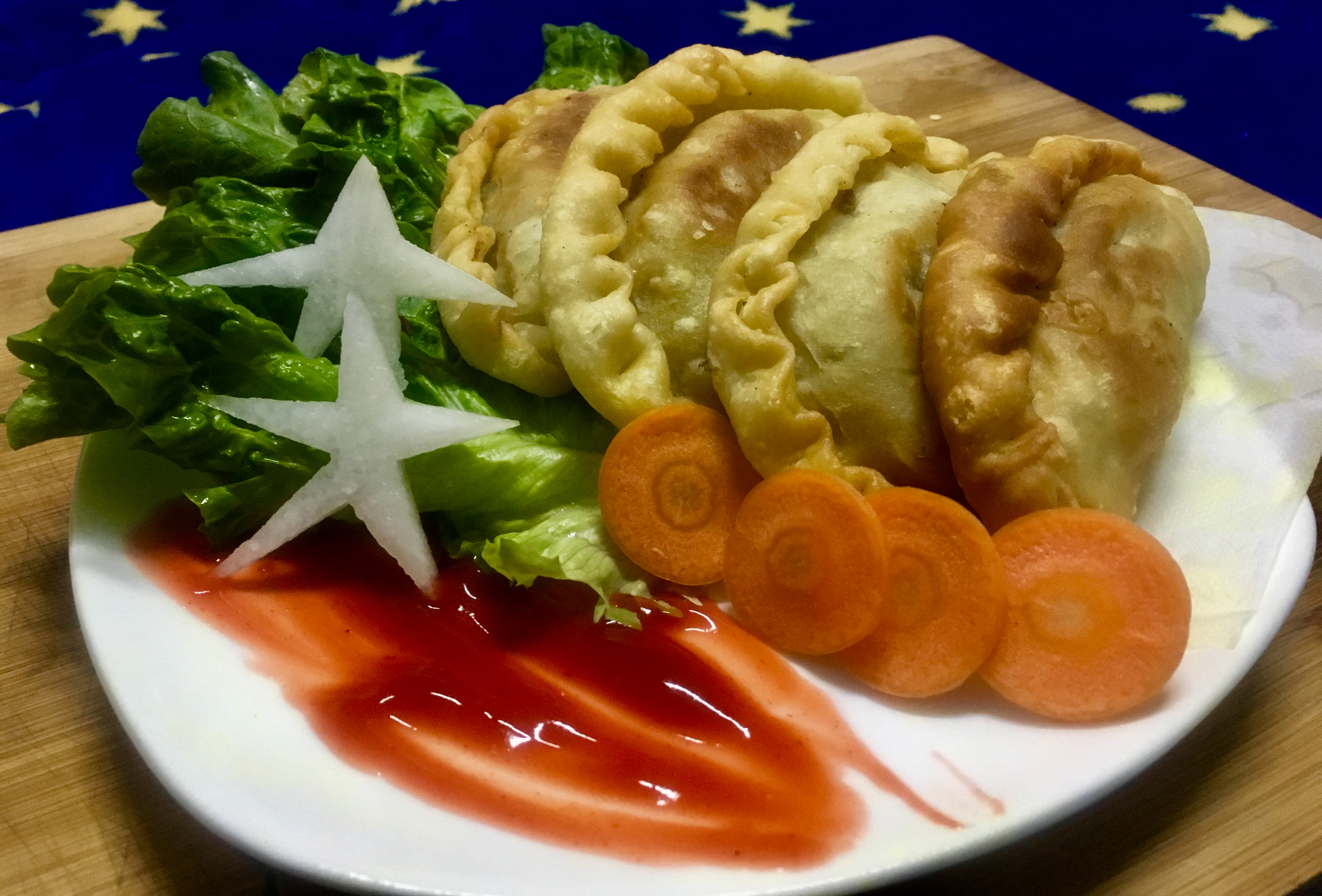
Fob

Bakarkhani is a flatbread that resembles porota and is commonly eaten during Iftar, the evening meal during the month of Ramadan

Handesh is a snack made of deep-fried dough sweetened with molasses or sugar. It is served on special occasions such as the festival of Eid al-Fitr.

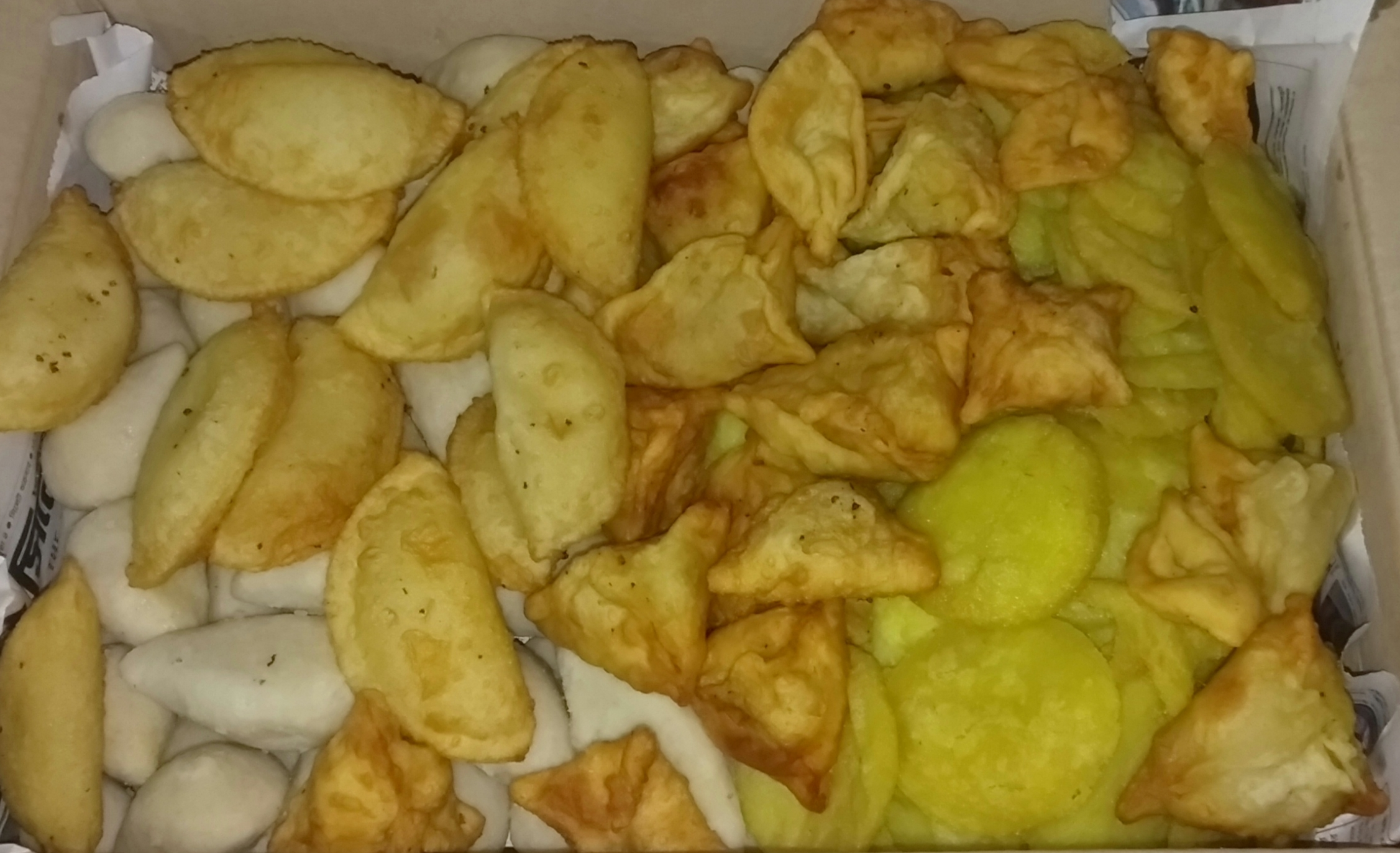
Sylheti rice-cakes and dumplings

Nunor Bora is a savoury snack made of rice flour and with onion, ginger and turmeric, fried to a golden colour.

Tusha Shinni is a dessert halwa made from sweetened dough with nuts and raisins that is usually served on special occasions.

Seven Color Tea is a colourful drink with multiple different layers of flavoured tea.

== Bangladeshi-run restaurants in Great Britain ==
In the early 20th century sailors from Sylhet, known as Lascars, settled in the United Kingdom. They bought fish and chip restaurants and developed them into full service Indian restaurants. They based the cuisine offered there on that sold by established Anglo-Indian restaurants and on Mughal Cuisine.

More than 8 out of 10 of over 8,000 "Indian restaurants" in the UK are owned by Bangladeshis, 95% of who come from Sylhet.

The culinary historian Lizzie Collingham wrote that

"Sylheti curry cooks converted "unadventurous British palates" to a new flavour spectrum".

== Sweets ==
Amriti is a flower-shaped deep-fried dessert in sugary syrup that is popular in Dhaka and Tangail.

Chomchom is a traditional sweet that originated in Porabari. The sweet is oval and brown.

Boondi is popular during Ramadan.

Balish mishti (lit. pillow sweet) is a large pillow-shaped sweet from Netrokona District.

Jilapi is a pretzel-shaped sweet in syrup that is popular throughout South Asia. Shahi jilapi (royal jilapi) is a very large, pinwheel-shaped variant from Dhaka.

Kachagolla is a dessert made of dairy ingredients and sugar that is from Natore District in Rajshahi Division. It may have been presented to the 18th century ruler Rani Bhabani.

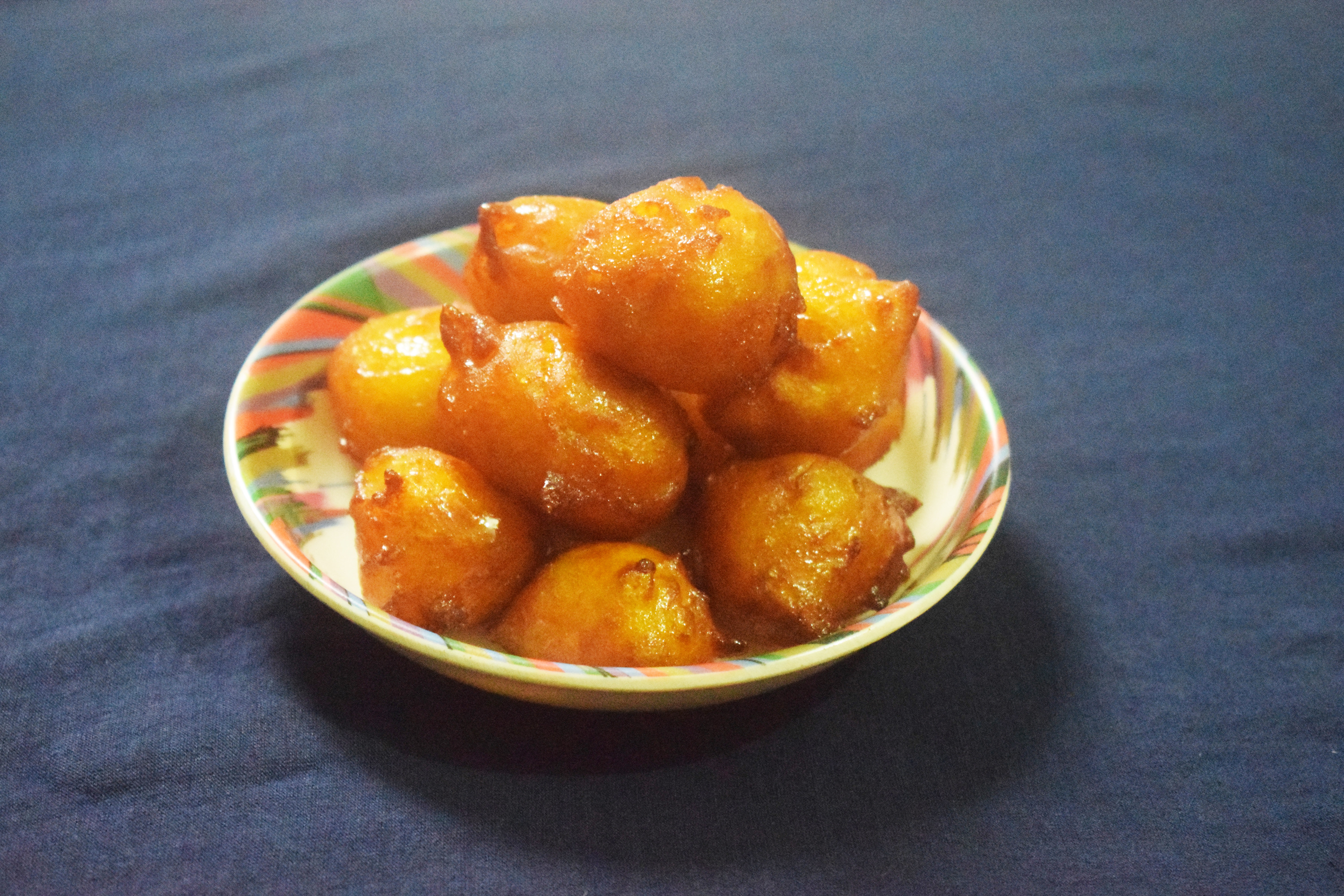
Dessert made with the fruit of Palmyra palm

Ledikeni is a light fried reddish-brown ball made of chhena and flour, soaked in sugar syrup. It was devised in the mid-19th century and named after Lady Canning, the wife of the Governor-General of India.

Pantua is the Bengali version of gulab jamun.

Ras malai is a dessert of balls of chhana milk solids in a cream sauce flavoured with cardamom.

Taal, the fruit of the Palmyra palm is used in a variety of desserts.

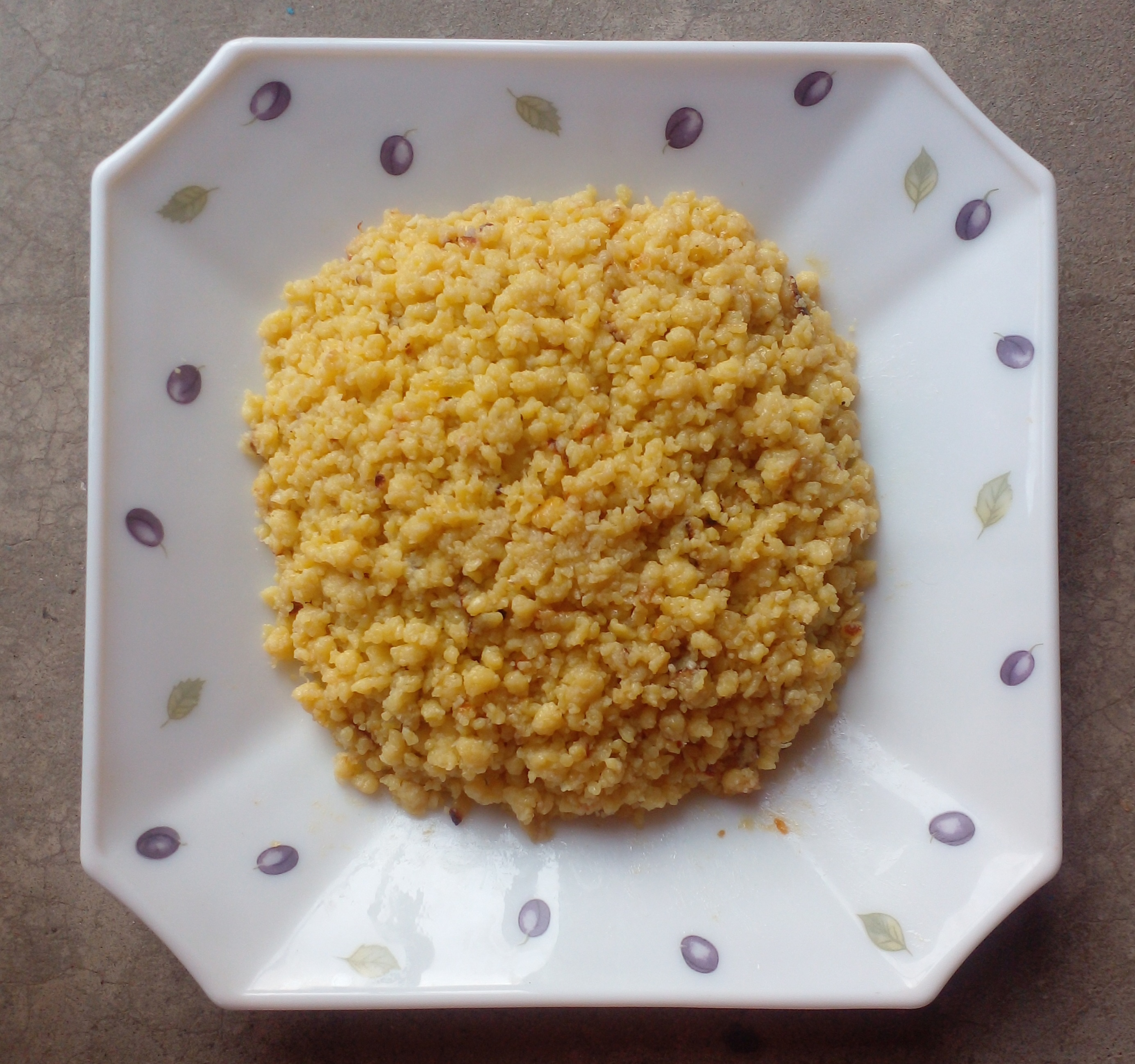
Dimer Jorda

Dimer Jorda also known as Egg Jorda or Egg Halwa is a Bangladeshi informal popular sweet dish. It is halwa made using egg and milk.

== Beverages ==
- Borhani, (Bengali: বোরহানী) is a traditional yogurt-like drink Borhani is made from sour doi, green chilli, mustard seeds, black salt, coriander and mint. It is popular as a digestive after heavy meals or as an appetizer beforehand.
- Taal er rosh (Palm juice) is the sap extracted from palm trees and drank as a cool beverage in summer.
- Rooh Afza is a concentrated squash made by Hamdard Bangladesh.
- Ghol and matha are buttermilk drinks made in Bangladesh, especially in the village of Solop in Ullahpara Upazila of Sirajganj District.
- Lassi is a blend of yogurt with water and either spices or sweet flavourings.

=== Alcoholic beverages ===
As a majority Muslim country, alcohol sales in Bangladesh are controlled. A government permit is necessary to purchase alcoholic drinks.

- Hunter Beer is the only alcoholic beer produced in Bangladesh. It is manufactured by Jamuna Group.
- Carew & Co is a government-owned distillery located in Chuadanga District.
- Non-Bengali tribes produce and consume alcohol from fermented rice.

== See also ==
- Food industry in Bangladesh
- List of Bangladeshi dishes
- List of Bangladeshi sweets and desserts
- List of Bangladeshi spices
- Bengali cuisine
- Chaunk
- Panta bhat
