= List of Bangladeshi dishes =

Bangladeshi cuisine refers to the food and culinary traditions prevalent in Bangladesh. Dating far in the past, the cuisine emphasizes fish, vegetables and lentils served with rice. Because of differences in history and Bangladeshi geography, the cuisine is rich in regional variations. While having unique traits, Bangladeshi cuisine is closely related to that of surrounding Bengali and North-East Indian, with rice and fish as traditional favorites. Bangladesh also developed the only multi-course tradition in South Asia. It is known as Bangaliketa styled cuisine. Bangladeshi food is served by course rather than all at once.

== Bangladeshi dishes ==
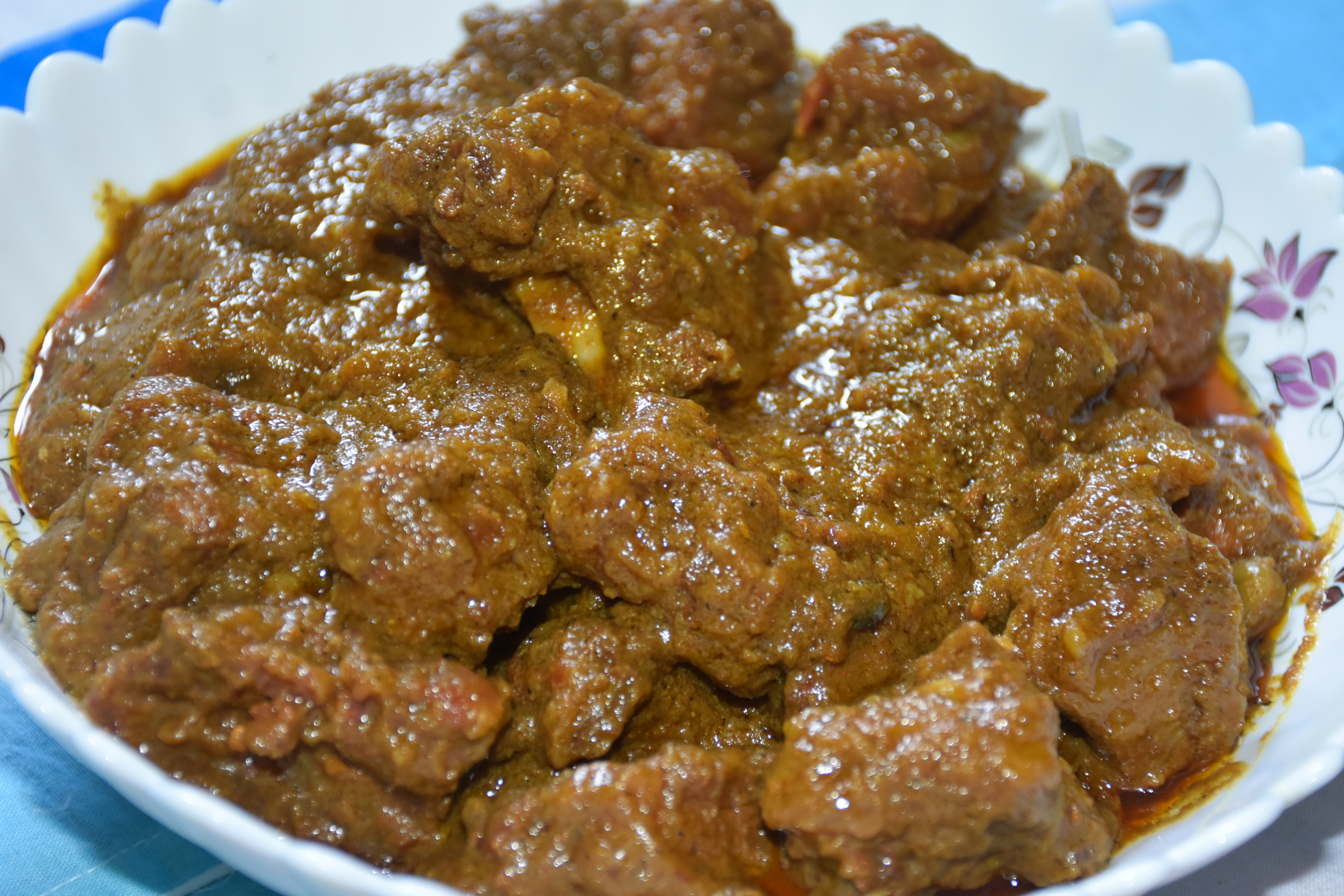

== Vegetable items ==
Name	Image	Description
Aloo Bhorta		Made of mashed potato and dried chilies and onions
Begun Bhorta		Dish made of mashed aubergine - similarities with Baba ghanoush
Lau Chingri		Spicy curry made with calabash and shrimp
Lal Shak bhaja		A stir fry-like dish made with Red Amaranth
Aam er achar		Pickle made from green mango
Ruti		Also known as chapati is a flatbread originating from Bangladesh
Shobji		Curry consisted of various greens and vegetables

== Rice items ==
Name	Image	Description
Lal Bhaat		Special local variety of rice
Biryani		Special local variety of rice, meat, potato and spices
Bhuna Khichuri		Rice dish with beef/chicken/mutton
Morog Polao		Bangladeshi variety of high quality rice like Kalijira, chinigura, Ichagura with chicken
Kacchi Biriyani		Biriyani with mutton
Panta bhat		Fermented rice, yogurt, salt and seasonings
Polao		Special local variety of rice, meat, potato and spices
Bhaat		Shada Bhat or Staple food
Tehari		Special local variety of rice, meat, potato and spices

== Fish items ==
Name	Image	Description
Chingri Malai curry		Curry made with prawns, coconut, mustard, steamed
Nodir (River) Pangas Bhuna		Curry of river Pangasius pangasius
Horioh machh		Golden mustard fish curry
Ilish Bhaja		Fried Ilish (Hilsha fish)
Koi Macher Curry		Koi Mach Climbing perch curry
Machher Jhol		Curry prepared with fish and various spices
Magur Macher Jhol		Magur fish curry
Rui Bhaja		Fried Rui fish, a common dish in Bangladesh
Shing Macher Jhol		Stinging catfish curry
Sorshe Ilish		Ilish Hilsha curry with mustard and spices
Shutki Bhuna		Cooked dried fish

== Vegetables and fish together ==
Name	Image	Description
Fulkopi diye Shing mach		Cauliflower curry with Stinging catfish

== Meat items ==
Name	Image	Description
Beef Kala bhuna		A beef (or mutton) curry, very popular to Bangladeshis. From Chittagong
Beef Chui Jhal		A beef (or mutton) curry, very popular to Bangladeshis. From Khulna
Beef Curry		Common beef curry in Bangladesh
Gorur Kolija Bhuna		Beef liver curry
Gorur Vuri Bhaja/Vuna		Dish made of beef belly with local spices
Chicken roast		Bangladeshi style chicken roast, cooked in ghee and an array of spices.
Chicken Curry		Common chicken curry in Bangladesh
Mutton Curry		Common mutton curry in Bangladesh

== Lentils/dal and stew ==
Name	Image	Description
Dal		Lentils
Haleem		A famous stew made of a variety of lentils with beef/mutton. The Bangladeshi version of Haleem is very different from the Hyderabad one.
Mishti chholar dal		Curry prepared with Bengal gram, coconut and sugar
MashKalai daal		Stew/daal of black gram

== Drinks ==
Name	Image	Description
Borhani		Spicy yogurt drink
Lassi		Yogurt and water based drink
Faluda		Sweet, cold dessert drink made with milk, vermicelli, basil seeds, and flavored syrups
Malai Tea		Made by putting Malai in Milk Tea

== Pitha ==
Name	Image	Description
Bhapa pitha		Steamed rice cake made out of freshly ground rice flour with brown sugar syrup or jaggery
Nakshi Pitha		Designed rice flour cake with jaggery or sugar syrup dipped on it
Kuli Pitha		Rice flour cake with coconut and brown sugar

== Sweets & desserts ==
Name	Image	Description
Chomchom misty		Dessert: cottage cheese, flour, sugar syrup, originated from the district of Tangail
Rasmalai		A popular desert. Rasmalai from Cumilla city is the most popular one
Falooda		Made with variety of items such as fruits and ice cream
Laddu		A type of round sweet
Jilapi		Made with flour and syrup
Mishti doi		Dessert: curd, sugar syrup and / or jaggery
Muri laru		Bengali sweet snack made of puffed rice
Payesh		Dessert made of milk, rice and sometimes jaggery
Pera		Sweet
Roshogolla		Dessert prepared with cottage cheese, flour and sugar syrup
Shandesh		Dessert prepared with milk and sugar

== Snacks and street food ==
Name	Image	Description
Chotpoti		Street food, also made in households
Fuchka		A common and popular street snack in Bangladesh, specially in Dhaka
Bhelpuri		Popular Bangladeshi specialty street snack similar to Fuchka
Dimer chop		Snacks made from Egg
Doi Fuchka		A common street snack
Haleem		A popular stew made of variety of lentils with beef/mutton. Bangladeshi version of Haleem is very different from the Hyderabad one.
Jhalmuri		Made with puffed rice and many other spices
Mughlai paratha		It can be a soft fried bread enhanced by a stuffing of keema (minced meat), egg, onions and pepper; or a paratha stuffed with same things.
Dal Puri		Deep fried flat bread made from maida

== See also ==
- Bengali cuisine
- Culture of Bangladesh
- List of cuisines
