= Tahri =

Tahri may refer to

- Tahri (dish), a yellow rice dish in Awadhi cuisine
- Bouabdellah Tahri (born 1978), runner of Algerian descent
- Jihan El-Tahri, writer, director and producer of documentary films from Lebanon
