= Duck bamboo curry =

Bangladeshi duck meat dish

Ash bash
- Alternative names: Ash bash, duck bamboo curry
- Course: main
- Place of origin: Bangladesh
- Region or state: Sylhet Division
- Main ingredients: Bamboo shoots, duck, spices (onion, garlic and ginger), curd
- Variations: Duck-bamboo with or without milk

Duck bamboo curry is a mildly spiced curry of duck meat with bamboo shoots, from the Sylhet Division of Bangladesh and India.

== See also ==
- Bangladeshi cuisine
- List of duck dishes
