= Thoikor Tenga =

- Alternative names: Thoikor Khatta
- Course: Main
- Place of origin: Bangladesh
- Region or state: Sylhet
- Main ingredients: Thoikor, onion, garlic etc.

Thoikor Tenga is a very popular dish originated in Sylhet, Bangladesh and also popular in Sylheti dominated areas of India. Although Thoikor is an uncommon fruit, it is found almost all year round in the Sylhet region like Hatkora. This sour fruit is mostly used in cooking with small fish.

Thoikor is a vegetable species without seed and citrus flavors. It is available in large quantities in three-four months starting from December. However, it can be collected from the market throughout the year. Fish and meat are cooked with Thoikor. Many people are confused this vegetable with Defol. In fact, Thoikor looks like a big apple. Thoikor is green when its raw and yellow when its ripe. This fruit can be used to cook fish and roasted beef.

== Ingredients ==
Soybean oil, paste of onion, garlic and ginger, turmeric, grinded ginger, salt, chilli powder, Thoikor and fish.

== Procedure ==
First, oil is heated in a saucepan. Then grinded garlic is lightly fried. After that, rest of the spices are also fried and adding Thoikor and fish it is covered. Once it is prepared, it is taken down.
