= Alcohol in Bangladesh =

Alcohol in Bangladesh is regulated and restricted. Bangladesh has one of the lowest alcohol consumption rates in the world according to a World Bank report published in 2015.

== History ==
The first distillery was set up in what is today Bangladesh in 1887 by an Englishman named Robert Russell Carew. The company was called Carew & Co (Bangladesh) Ltd and it was nationalised by the government of Bangladesh in 1973. The distillery is part of the Darsana Sugar Mill owned by the state-owned enterprise Bangladesh Sugar and Food Industries Corporation. It is the only sugar out of 15 state-owned mills that profit from the distillery. The distillery produces rum, brandy, gin and whisky.

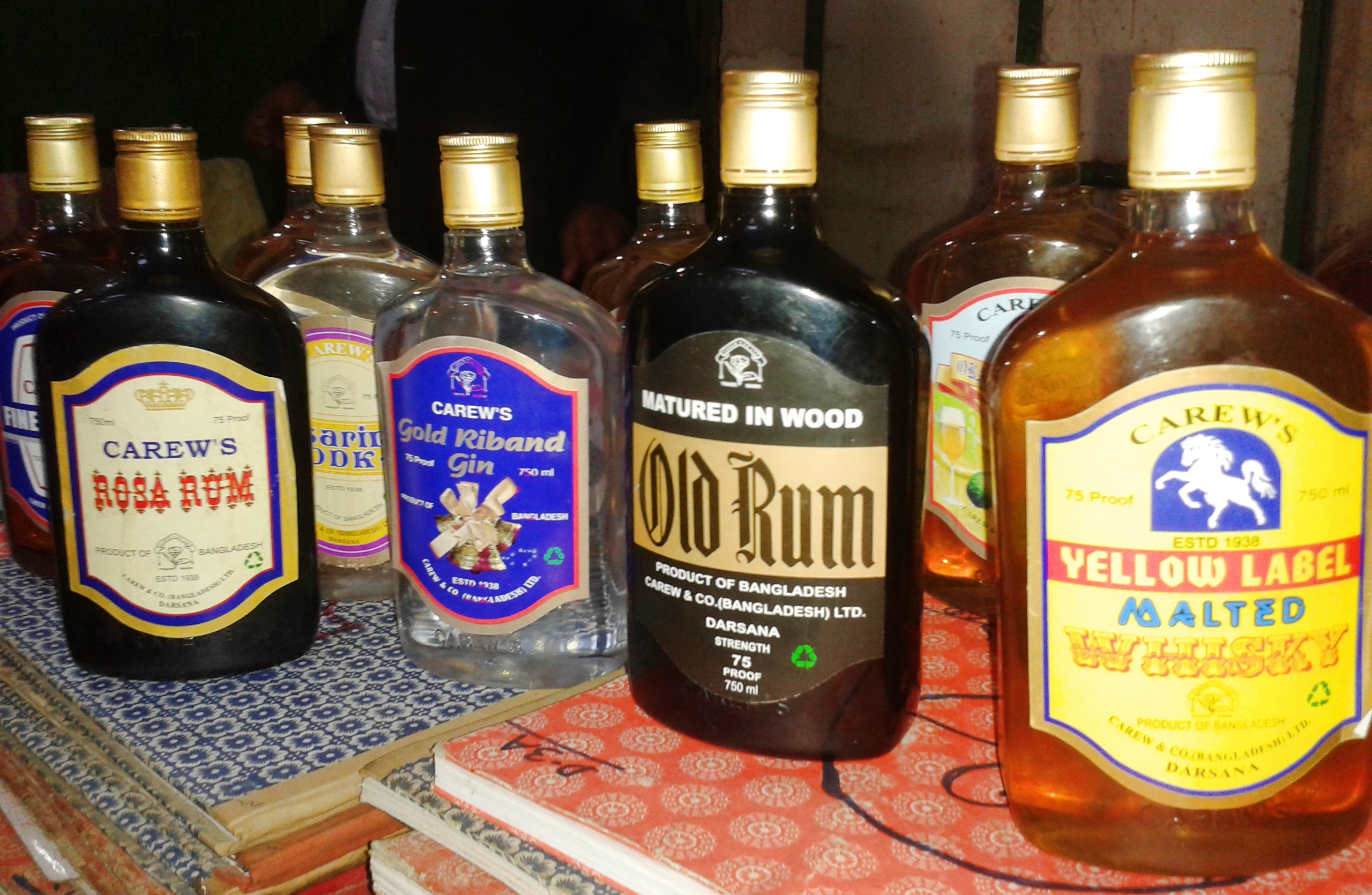
Products of Darsana Distilary

In 2003 the government of Bangladesh gave Jamuna Distillery Limited of Jamuna Group the licence to produce alcoholic beverages. Jamuna Distillery Limited was the first private company to be given a licence to produce alcohol which ended the monopoly of the state-owned Carew & Co (Bangladesh) Ltd. Alcohol is sold in 5-star hotels and government-licensed bars. In 2009 Jamuna launched Hunter branded beer in Bangladesh.

== Law ==
Under Bangladeshi law, any beverage containing more than 0.5% alcohol is considered an alcoholic beverage. A government permit is necessary for selling, storing and transporting alcohol. To drink alcohol in Bangladesh, one must have a legal permit, almost always given to non-Muslims. Muslims will need a medical prescription to obtain an alcohol permit. The prescription must be given by an associate professor of the medical college or a civil surgeon. Legal age of applying for a permit is 21. Foreigners do not need a permit to drink inside licensed bars.

In 2022, the Ministry of Home Affairs in Bangladesh introduced Alcohol Control Rules for regulating sales, storage, production, processing, and consumption of alcohol. The changes include: introduction of minimum age (21) for sales; increase of licence and renewal fees; mandatory health warning label on all alcoholic product bottles; restrictions on marketing; permits requirement for consumption and use.
