= Food industry in Bangladesh =

Auto Rice Mill

The food industry is a rapidly growing sector in Bangladesh, employing a significant portion of the labor force in the country.

== History ==
Between 2004 and 2010, the food processing industry in Bangladesh grew at an average 7.7 percent per annum. Bangladesh Bureau of Statistics, in its 25006 Economic Census, reported that there were approximately 246 medium-sized food processing industries employing 19 percent of the industrial manufacturing workforce in Bangladesh or 8 percent of the total manufacturing labor force. The food industry employs 2.45 percent of the country's total labor force and its share in the GDP was 2.01 percent in 2010. There are also numerous small scale factories and domestic units engaged in food processing throughout the country. According to some industry analysts, the food processing sector in Bangladesh is a 4.5 billion US Dollar industry. In 2010, Bangladesh exported over $700 million worth of processed food and beverages, over 60 percent of them were shrimp and fish products.

Food processing in Bangladesh has traditionally been small scale, with domestic or family business using common processing knowledge for the conservation and handling of raw agricultural commodities to make them usable as food and feed. Although commercial scale food processing using modern technology especially for wheat and rice milling, mustard seed crushing and very limited bread and cookie manufacturing appeared during the 1960s, the growth of this sector did not gain momentum in terms of operational scale and quality until the 1980s. Recently the defining characteristics of the industry has been the processing of increasingly diverse products to meet the changing demands of the Bangladesh population. The major food processing sub-sectors in Bangladesh include dairy, edible oil, sugar, rice, wheat, fruit and vegetable, tea, poultry/beef, pulses and spices and fish processing industries. Induced by the vigorous growth of the diverse middle class population of Bangladesh and the growing demands for additional consumption, the food processing sector is set to witness further hefty expansion in the coming years.
