= Tusha shinni =

Sylheti dessert

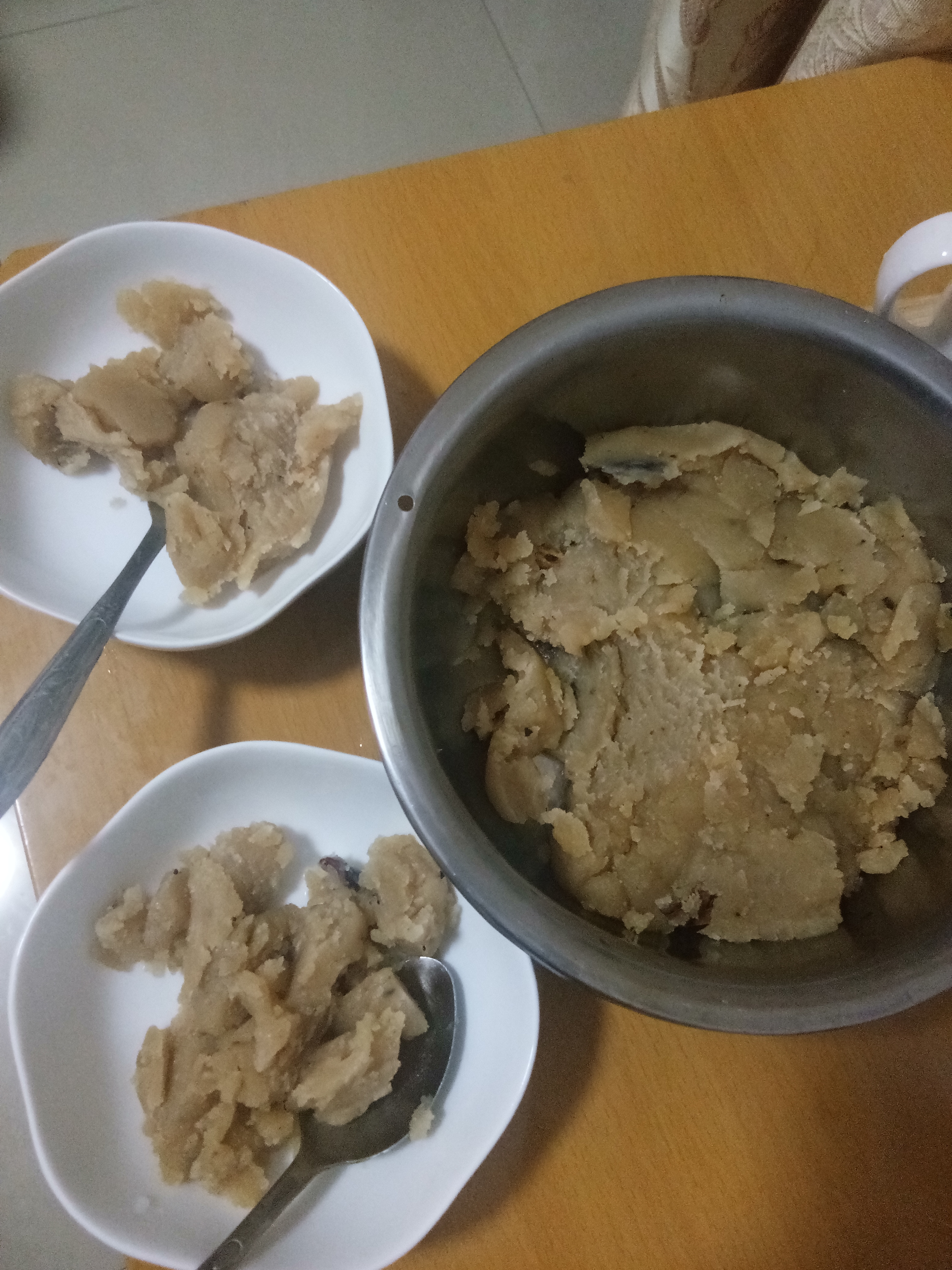
- Place of origin: Bangladesh
- Region or state: Sylhet
- Serving temperature: Warm
- Main ingredients: Flour, sugar, oil + ghee, water, cinnamon, cardamom, raisins, bay leaf

Tusha shinni (Sylheti: ꠔꠥꠡꠣ ꠡꠤꠘ꠆ꠘꠤ) is a halwa dessert from the Sylhet region of Bangladesh. It is soft in texture, sweet and lightly spiced, and frequently served on religious holidays.

Tusha shinni is made by stirring a flour and oil dough into a hot cinnamon-infused sugar syrup. It is decorated with almonds and raisins.
