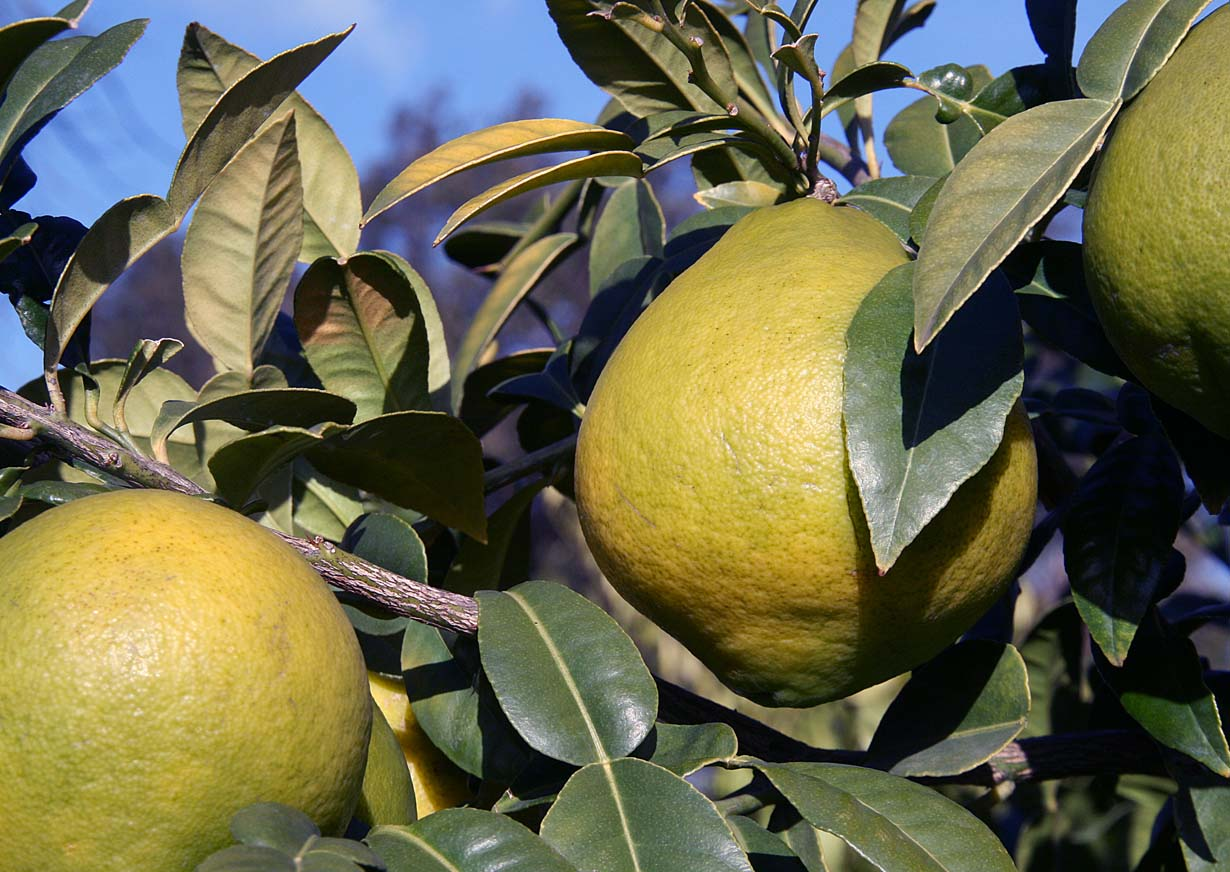

Scientific classification
- Kingdom: Plantae
- Clade: Tracheophytes
- Clade: Angiosperms
- Clade: Eudicots
- Clade: Rosids
- Order: Sapindales
- Family: Rutaceae
- Genus: Citrus
- Species: C. macroptera

Binomial name
- Citrus macroptera Montrouz.

Synonyms
- C. aurantium subsp. saponacea Saff.; C. papuana F.M.Bailey

= Citrus macroptera =

Citrus fruit and plant

Citrus macroptera, commonly known as Melanesian papeda, or wild orange, is a semi-wild species of citrus native to the Malesian ecoregion (Island Southeast Asia and Melanesia).

Some authorities consider C. macroptera to be a taxonomic synonym of C. hystrix (kaffir lime), while others consider C. macroptera var. annamensis to be a synonym of C. hystrix, but not C. macroptera var. macroptera.

Citrus macroptera is cultivated widely in the Sylhet region (South Asia) of Bangladesh and the Barak Valley Division of the Indian state of Assam, where it is known as hatkhora (Sylheti: ꠢꠣꠔꠇꠞꠣ, [ɦat̪xɔɾa]).

== Description ==
Citrus macroptera is so-named because of the large "wings" (-ptera) on the petiole, which is as large as the blade of the leaf. The tree, which has thorns, can reach 5 m (16 ft) in height. Its fruit is about 6–7 cm (2 1/2–3 in) in diameter, has a fairly smooth, moderately thick rind, and is yellow when ripe. The pulp of the fruit is light yellow and quite dry (does not produce much juice). The juice is bitter, and somewhat sour.

== Varieties ==
The species is sometimes divided into four varieties, or alternatively into three separate species, as follows:

- C. macroptera var. macroptera
- C. macroptera var. annamensis Tanaka -> C. combara Raf.
- C. macroptera var. combara (Raf.) Tanaka -> C. combara Raf.
- C. macroptera var. kerrii Swingle -> C. kerrii (Swingle) Tanaka

== Cultivation ==
Citrus macroptera is cultivated widely in the Sylhet region (South Asia) of Bangladesh and the Barak Valley Division of the Indian state of Assam, where it is known as hatkhora or (Sylheti: ꠢꠣꠔꠇꠞꠣ, [ɦat̪xɔɾa]).

Citrus macroptera is cultivated on a small scale in home gardens in the northeast Indian states of Mizoram, Tripura, and Meghalaya, where its fruit is used for various purposes. A cultivar of C. macroptera var. annamensis is grown in the Sylhet Division of northeastern Bangladesh.

Citrus macroptera is also commercially cultivated in South Africa, Spain, and Tonga. In Spain the plant serves as a rootstock for other Citrus species.

== Uses ==
=== Culinary uses ===
In Bangladesh, especially Sylhet, the thick fleshy rind of the Citrus macroptera is eaten as a vegetable, while the pulp is usually discarded because of its bitter-sour taste. The thick rind is cut into pieces and cooked (either green or ripe) in beef, goat, and fish curries. It is also used in lentil curries. Adding and cooking the rind in the curry gives a unique flavour and aroma to the curry. The rind is often sun-dried to preserve it for later cooking and consumption. The rind of this citrus fruit is also pickled and commercially sold.

=== Perfumery ===
The oil of the annamensis cultivar is used in the perfume industry.

== See also ==
- Bangladeshi cuisine
- Beef Hatkora
- Citrus latipes a similar-looking species native to Northeast India
