= Satkara beef =

Bengali dish

Beef satkara
- Course: Main
- Place of origin: Bangladesh
- Region or state: Sylhet Division
- Main ingredients: Beef, satkara, onion, garlic and bay leaf.

Beef satkara (Bengali: সাতকরার গরুর গোস্ত) is a part of Bengali cuisine consisting of rice, satkara citrus, and beef curry. Whilst having its origins in the Sylhet Division of Bangladesh, the dish has now gained popularity across the country and among the British Bangladeshi diaspora in the United Kingdom. At the time of Eid-ul-Adha, it is a famous dish. The presence of a citrus fruit makes the dish unique among Bangladeshi curries in terms of taste and aroma. A soupy variant of the dish is made with the bones of cow feet, and in other variants, the beef is sometimes replaced with fish or other meats.

== Ingredients ==
Vegetable oil, cinnamon, cardamom, fenugreek seeds, salt, onions, paste of garlic and ginger, beef chuck, chilli powder, turmeric, ground coriander and cumin, garam masala, satkara peel and a tomato.

== Procedure ==
Oil is heated in a large, heavy bottomed, non-stick saucepan. Then cinnamon, bay leaves, cardamom, star anise and fenugreek seeds are added to reheat for swirling in the oil to release the flavours. Adding beef, salt, spices and green chilies it is stirred for a while and then covered. Cutting the piece of satkara into wedges and then chop each wedge into small pieces. Satkara is added then followed up some hot water.

== Serving ==
The dish is served with glutinous rice or boiled white rice; a salad of cucumber, tomatoes and onions is a typical side dish. It is also eaten with pilau, khichdi and paratha.

== See also ==
- Bengali cuisine
- List of beef dishes
- Jhalmuri
