= Hunter (Bangladeshi beer) =

Brand of Jamuna Group

- Manufacturer: Crown Beverages Limited
- Introduced: January 2004; 21 years ago
- Alcohol by volume: 5.0%
- Style: Pale lager

Hunter is a brand of beer from Bangladesh. It is brewed by Crown Beverages Limited, a company in the Jamuna Group.

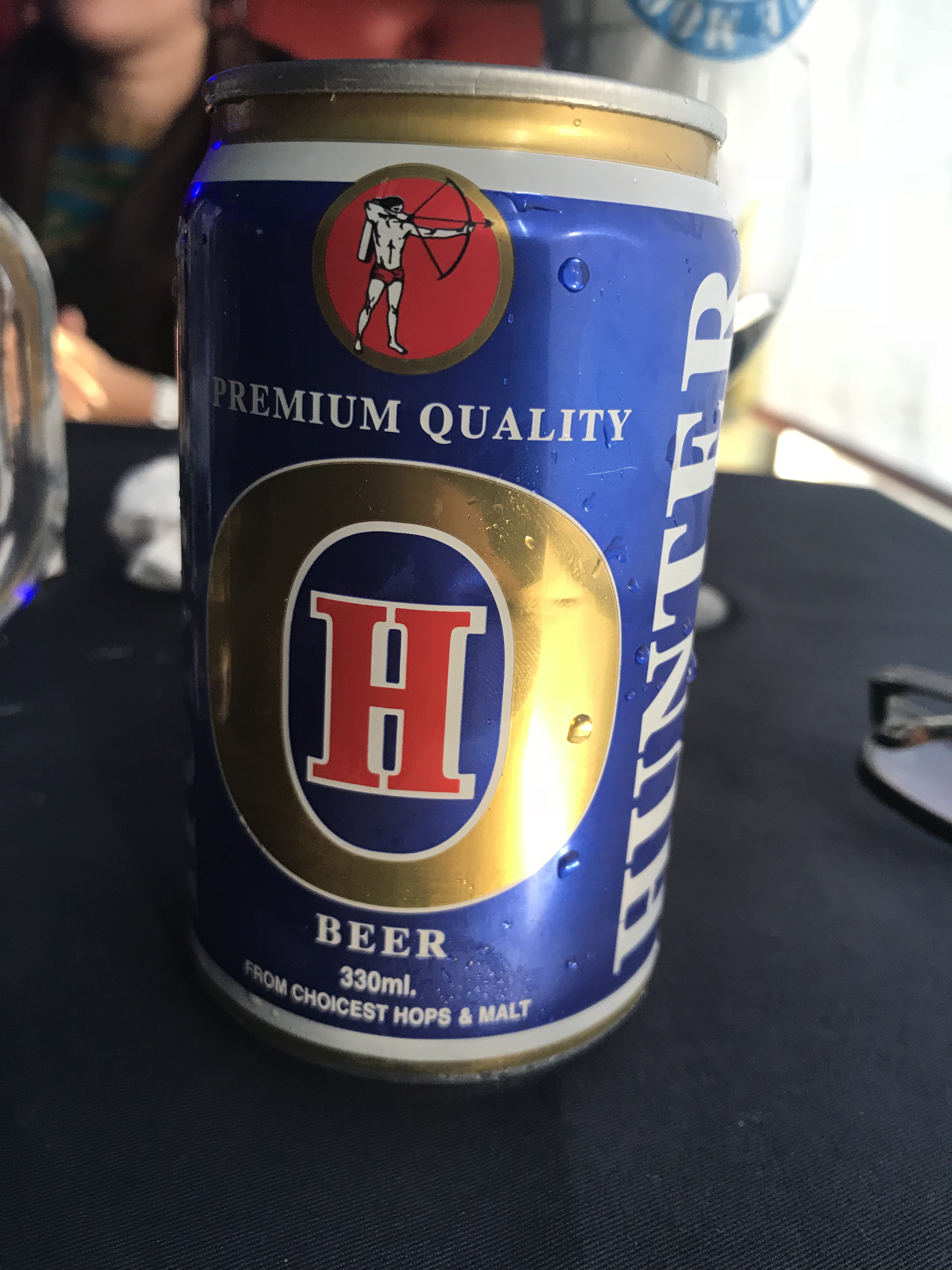
Hunter Beer can (330ml.)

Bangladesh has strict controls on the sale of alcoholic beverages. Its Narcotics Control Act 1990 bans the sale of beer, which it defines as a drink with an alcohol content of between 5% and 8.5%. Crown Beverages introduced brewed drinks under the Hunter and Crown brands with an alcohol content of less than 5% to conform with national law, calling them malt beverages. The packaging of Hunter beer closely imitates Australian brand Fosters Beer and Crown's packaging is modelled on Carlsberg Beer livery.

Sale of the beers has been protested by members of parliament and has led to court cases, but not to bans on production.
