= Tehri (dish) =

Popular Indian rice dish

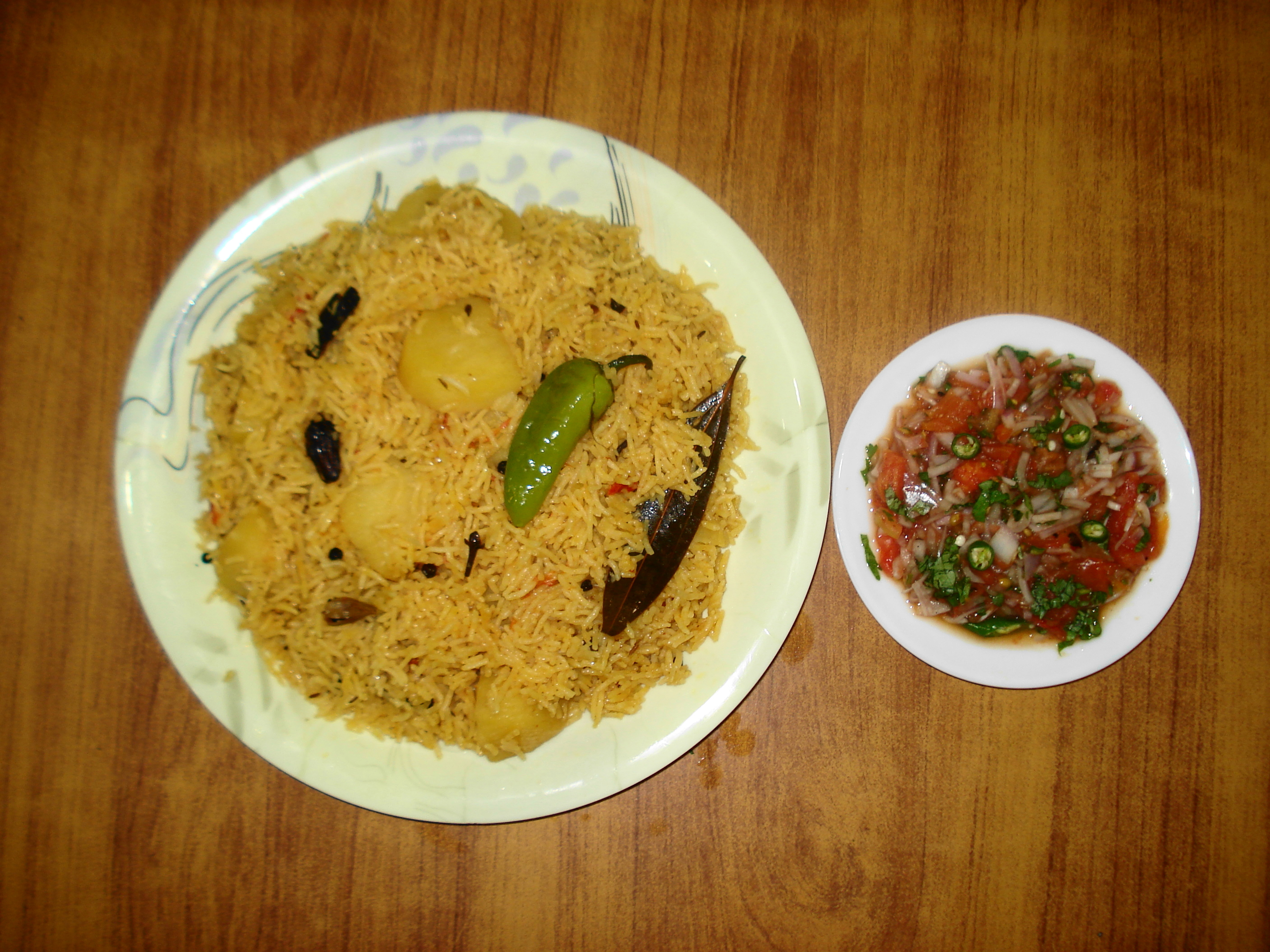
- Tahri with kachumbar salad
- Course: Main course
- Place of origin: South Asia
- Region or state: Indian Subcontinent
- Serving temperature: Hot
- Main ingredients: Rice; Vegetables, Lentil dumplings (Vadi), Meat, Spices

Tehri, tehar, tehari, or tahri (also rarely tapahri) is a spicy yellow rice dish originating from Awadh region of Uttar Pradesh in India. Rice is cooked with spices along with sun-dried lentil dumplings called Vadi, Wadi, Badi or Bori regionally, and multiple vegetables, and meat depending on regional variations. In one version of tehri, potatoes are added to the rice.

== Etymology ==
As per Monier-Williams Sanskrit-English Dictionary, the Awadhi word tehri is derived from the Sanskrit word tāpaharī, which is a dish prepared from rice, dal chunks (badi) and vegetables, cooked in ghee with spices, especially turmeric.

== Origin ==
The recipe for Tahari is mentioned with name Tapahari in ancient Ayurvedic treatise written in Sanskrit language, which was a preparation of rice cooked with vegetables and other ingredients. The recipe for Tahari also finds mention in Pakadarpana (1200 CE) cookbook, which uses meat of hen. Bhojanakutūhala (1675 CE) Sanskrit book on cookery and culinary traditions mentions taharī rice dish and it was eaten with side-dish of fried lentil fritters known as "vaṭakas". The ingredients for cooking tāpaharī in both text varies but are similar in technique; It was made with rice seasoned with spice-blend called "Trikatu" and "Trijataka" along with ghee, turmeric, wet ginger, asafoetida, water and salt. Pakadarpana cookbook adds meat of hen to this before cooking. In Bhojanakuthuhala, this rice dish was eaten with fried fritters known as Vaṭakas prepared from black-gram flour, rice flour and mixed with turmeric and fried in ghee. This preparation was called taharī or tāpaharī. Recipe also finds mentioned in Bhāvaprakāśa Nighaṇṭu, a 16th-century medical treatise.
