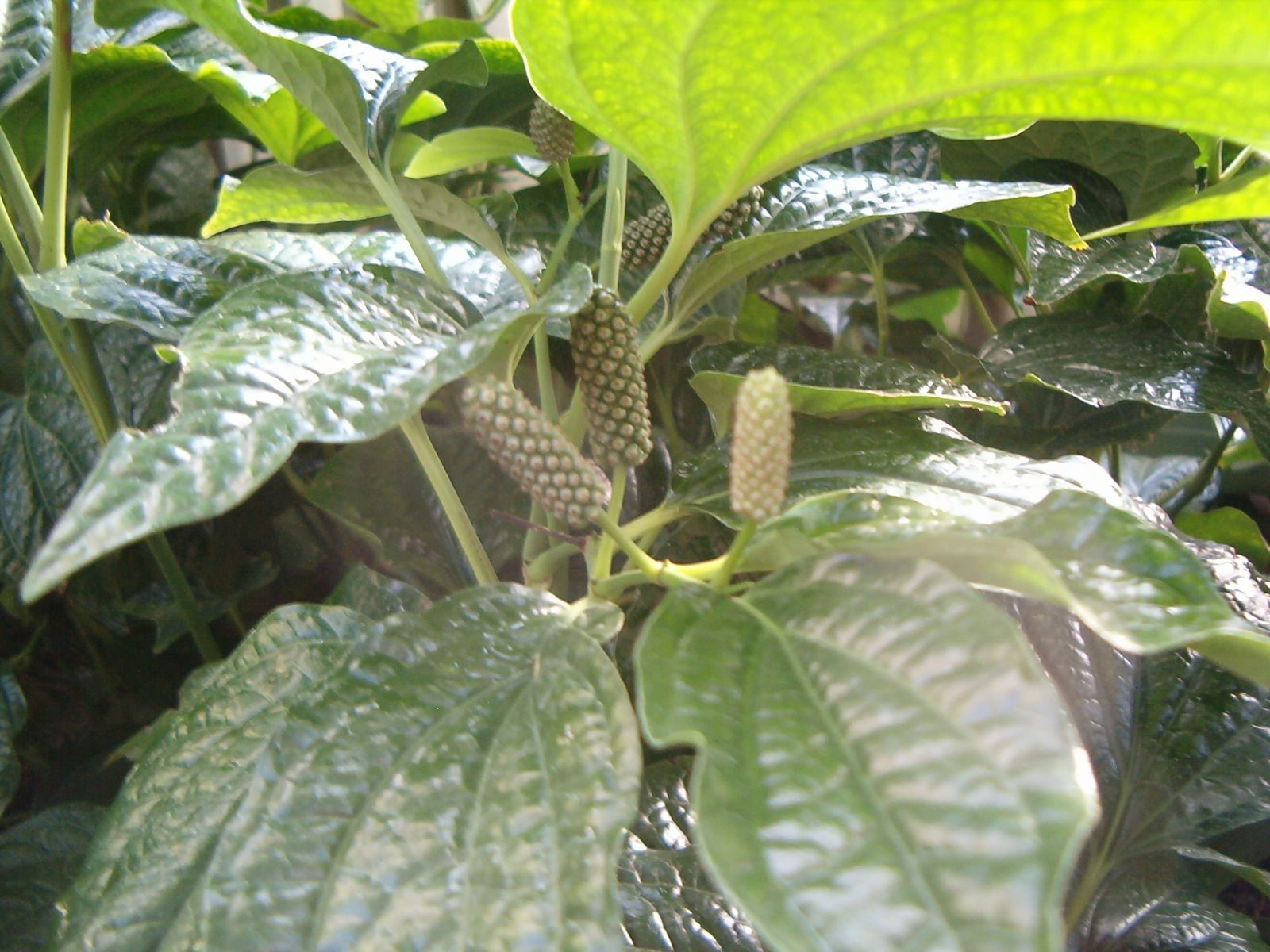

Scientific classification
- Kingdom: Plantae
- Clade: Tracheophytes
- Clade: Angiosperms
- Clade: Magnoliids
- Order: Piperales
- Family: Piperaceae
- Genus: Piper
- Species: P. chaba

Binomial name
- Piper chaba Trel. & Yunck.

= Piper chaba =

Species of flowering plant

Piper chaba, commonly known as piper chilli, is a flowering vine in the family Piperaceae native to South and Southeast Asia. P. chaba is called chui jhal or choi jhal in the Khulna Division of Bangladesh, and the states of Tripura and West Bengal in India. P. chaba is found throughout India, and other warmer regions of Asia including Malaysia, Indonesia, Singapore and Sri Lanka.

It is a creeper plant that spreads on the ground. It may also grow around large trees. The leaves are oval-shaped and about 2–3 inches (51–76 mm) long. The flowers are monoecious and blossom during the monsoon. The fruit looks similar to other varieties of long pepper, with an elongated shape that can grow up to 3 inches (76 mm) long. The fruit is red when ripe, which turns dark brown or black when dry.

== Culinary use ==
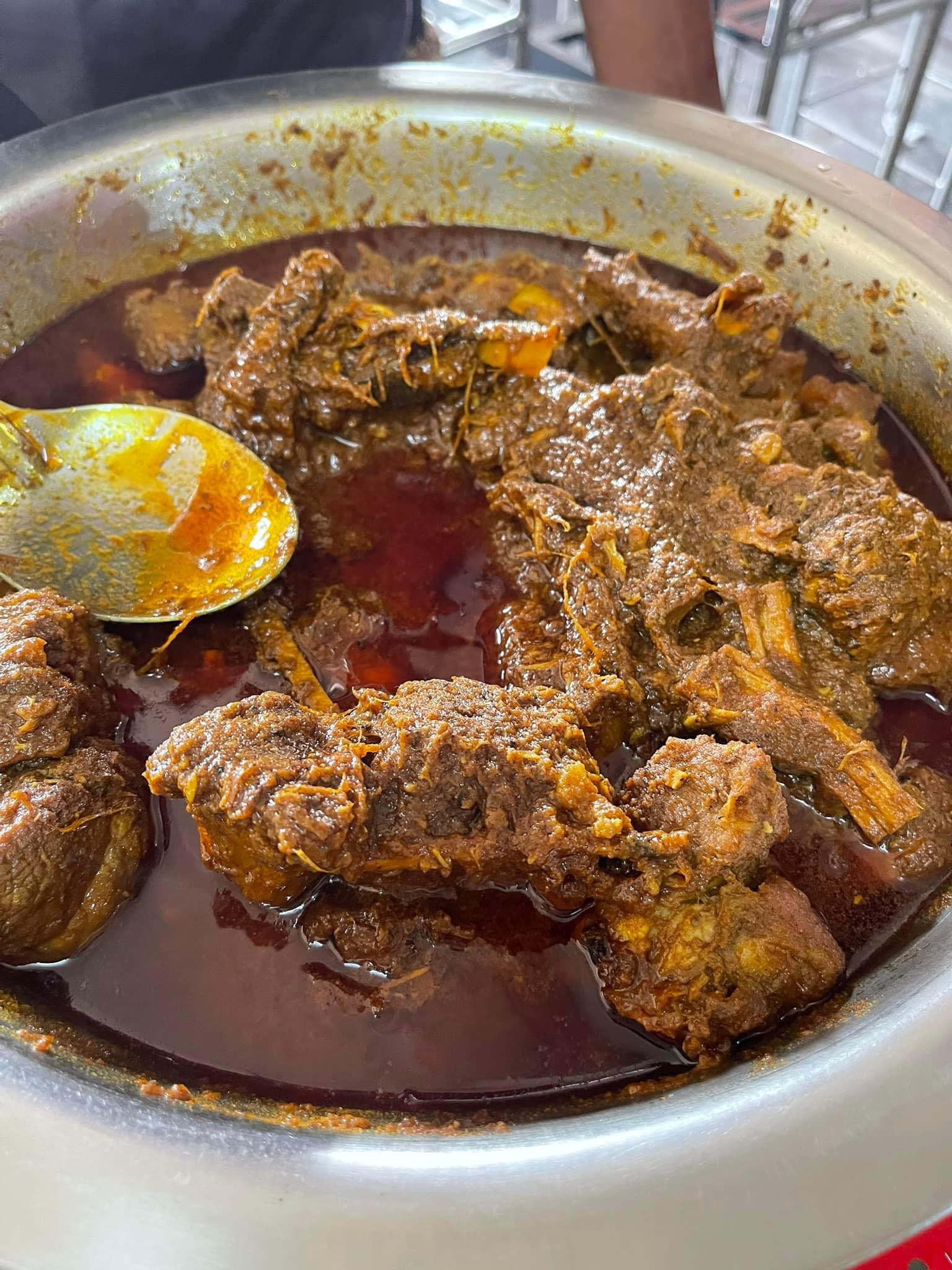
Mutton curry cooked with Chui Jhal in Jashore, Khulna Division, Bangladesh.

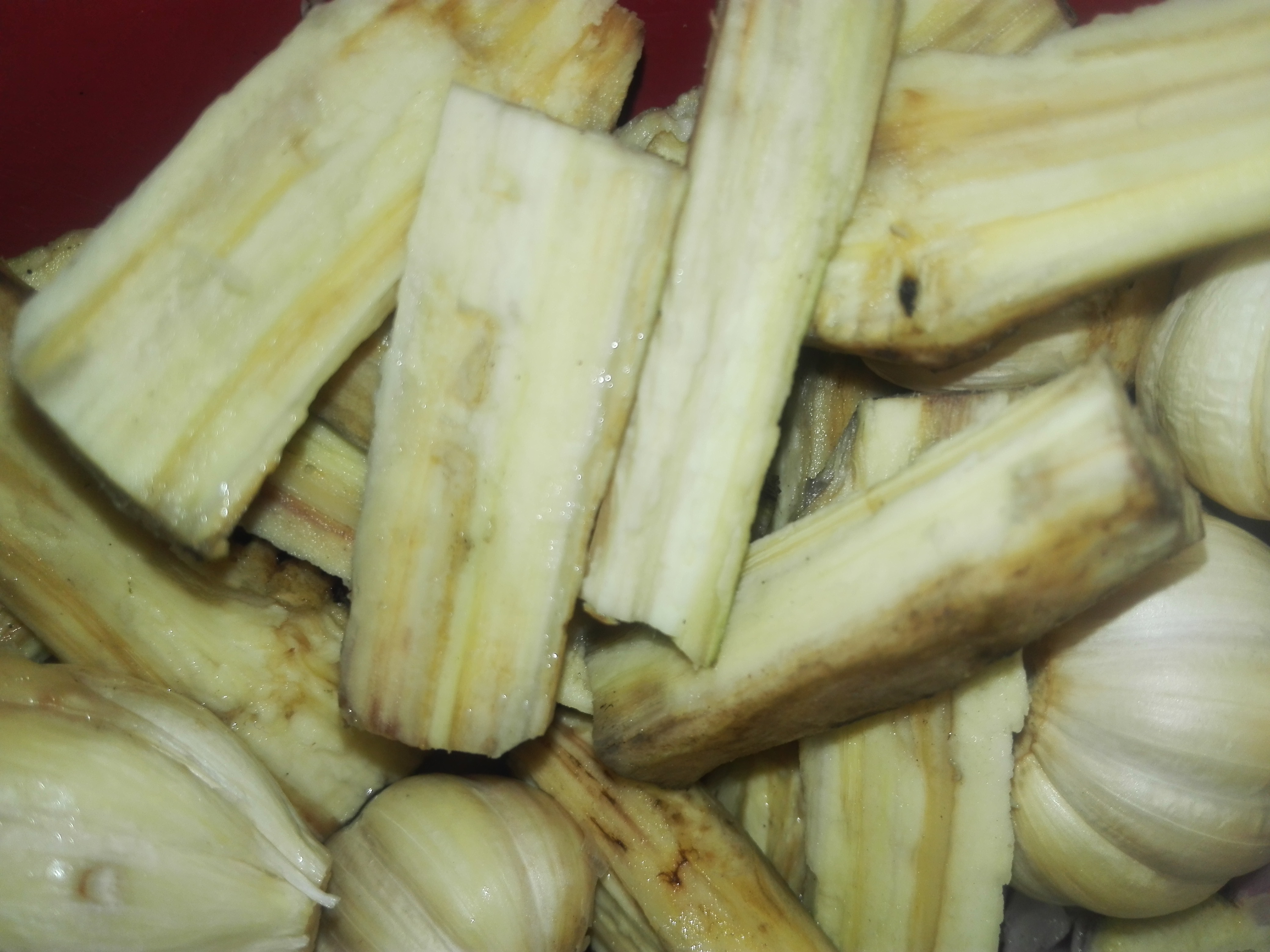
chui jhal

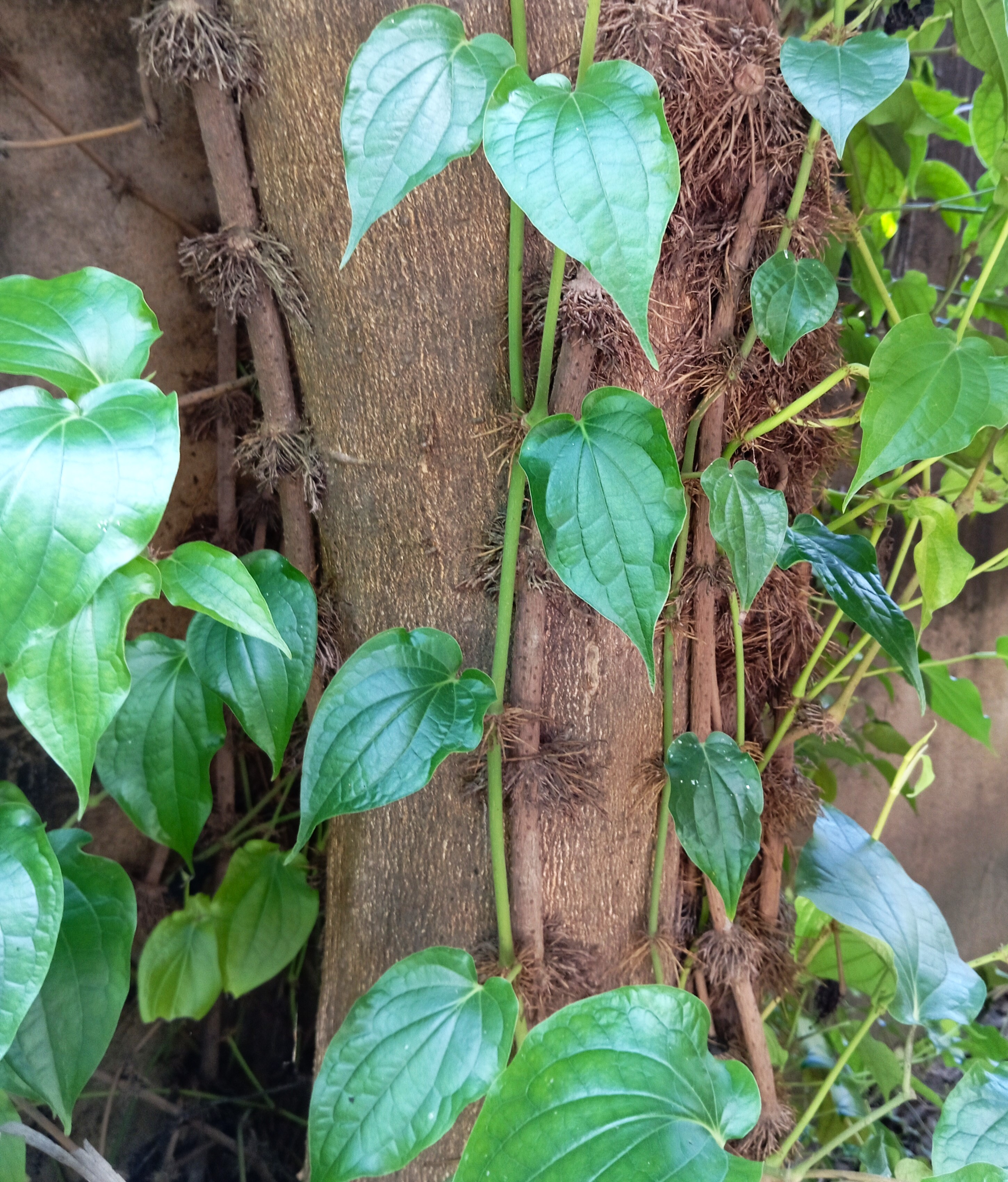
Chui jhal (Piper chaba) in Kolkata, West Bengal, India

People in Bangladesh's south-western districts like Khulna Division cut down the stem, roots, peel the skin and chop it into small pieces - and cook them with meat and fish, especially with mutton and beef curry. Chuijhal Meat Curry is a very popular dish in Khulna region. The spicy pungent flavor of Choi Jhal is a year-round additive spice. In Thailand, P. chaba is known commonly as dee plee and also referred to as "Thai long pepper" and it is consumed both in fresh and dried forms. Ground by mortar and pestle, P. chaba is an ingredient in a variety of Thai sauces and pastes, and it is added to soups to mute excessively strong fish flavors.

In Bangladesh, the stems of the plant are used as a spice in meat and fish dishes. In countries of South and Southeast Asia, the fruit of the Piperaceae vines is well known as a spice and is called the "long pepper". However, in Bangladesh the use of Choi Jhal is unique, because the twigs, stems or roots of P. chaba – not the fruit – are used as a spice. It is a relatively expensive spice in Bangladesh, and the roots are usually more expensive than the stems because of their stronger aroma. The taste is similar to horseradish.

== Medicinal uses ==
Piper chaba is also used in traditional Indian medicine.
